= Herndon =

Herndon may refer to:

== People ==
- Herndon (surname), an American surname
- Herndon Davis (1901–1962), American artist, journalist, illustrator, and painter

== Places in the United States ==
=== Communities ===
- Herndon, California, an unincorporated community
- Herndon, Georgia, an unincorporated community
- Herndon, Kansas, a city
- Herndon, Kentucky, an unincorporated community
- Herndon, Missouri, an unincorporated community
- Herndon, Pennsylvania, a borough
- Herndon, Virginia, a town
  - Herndon Historic District, a national historic district
- Herndon, West Virginia, an unincorporated community
- Herndon Homes, a former housing project in Atlanta, Georgia

=== Historic buildings and monuments ===
- Herndon Building, a historic professional building in Atlanta, Georgia
- Herndon Depot Museum, a historic railroad depot museum in Herndon, Virginia
- Herndon Hall, a historic house in Des Moines, Iowa
- Herndon Home, a historic house museum in Atlanta, Georgia
- Herndon Monument, a monument in Annapolis, Maryland
- Herndon Terrace, a historic house in Union, South Carolina

=== Schools ===
- Herndon Career Center, a career and technical high school in Raytown, Missouri
- Herndon High School, a public high school in Herndon, Virginia
- Herndon High School (Kansas), a former high school in Herndon, Kansas

=== Transportation centers ===
- Herndon station, a planned Washington Metro station in Herndon, Virginia
- Orlando Executive Airport, a public airport in Orlando, Florida, formerly called Herndon Airport

=== Other ===
- Herndon House, a former hotel in Omaha, Nebraska
- Herndon Stadium, an abandoned stadium in Atlanta, Georgia

== Ships ==
- USS Herndon, the name of more than one United States Navy ship
- USS Raymon W. Herndon (APD-121), a United States Navy high-speed transport in commission from 1944 to 1946
