= Herndon (surname) =

Herndon is a surname. Notable people with the surname include:

- Adrienne McNeil Herndon (1869–1910), African American woman in Atlanta, Georgia
- Alonzo Herndon (1858–1927), African-American businessman
- Angelo Herndon (1913–1997), African-American communist organizer
- Astead Herndon, American journalist
- C. Nash Herndon (1916–1998), American geneticist and eugenicist
- Charles Herndon, American sculptor
- Charles W. Herndon, American politician from Arizona
- Chris Herndon (born 1996), American football player
- Curtis C. Herndon (1925–2009), American politician
- Dallas T. Herndon (1878–1953), American author and historian
- David Herndon (born 1985), American professional baseball player
- David R. Herndon (born 1953), United States federal judge
- Destiny Herndon-De La Rosa (born 1982), American consistent life ethic activist
- Don Herndon (1936–2009), American professional football player
- Ellen Lewis Herndon (1837–1880), wife of the 21st President of the United States, Chester A. Arthur
- Holly Herndon (born 1980), American composer, musician, and sound artist
- James Herndon (writer) (1926–1990), American writer and educator
- Jimmy Herndon (born 1973), American professional football player
- J. Marvin Herndon (born 1944), American scientist who founded the georeactor theory
- Joe Herndon (born 1949), American R&B and soul singer for The Spaniels and The Temptations
- John Hunter Herndon (1813-1878), American judge and planter in antebellum Texas
- Judith Herndon (1941–1980), American Senator of West Virginia
- Junior Herndon (born 1978), American professional baseball player
- Kelly Herndon (born 1976), American professional football player
- Kenneth Herndon (born 1985), American professional baseball player
- Larry Herndon (born 1953), American professional baseball player
- Marcia Herndon (1941-1997), American ethnomusicologist and anthropologist
- Patrick Herndon (1802–1836), American soldier who fought at the Alamo
- Raymon W. Herndon (1918–1942), United States Marine Corps Navy Cross recipient
- Steve Herndon (born 1977), American professional football player
- Susan Herndon, American singer-song writer
- Thomas Herndon (born 1985)
- Thomas H. Herndon (1828–1883), U.S. Representative from Alabama
- Tre Herndon (born 1996), American football player
- Ty Herndon (born 1962), American country music singer
- William Herndon (lawyer) (1818–1891), law partner and biographer of Abraham Lincoln
- William Lewis Herndon (1813–1857), United States Navy scientist, explorer, and hero
- William S. Herndon (1835–1903), U.S. Representative from Texas

== See also ==
- Hendon
