= Herndon High School (disambiguation) =

Herndon High School is a high school in Herndon, Virginia.

Herndon High School may also refer to:

- Herndon High School (Kansas), in Herndon, Kansas
- Herndon High School (West Virginia), in Wyoming County, West Virginia (defunct)

== See also ==
- Herndon Career Center, a school in Raytown, Missouri
