= 1856 Panama Railroad accident =

Train accident in Panama

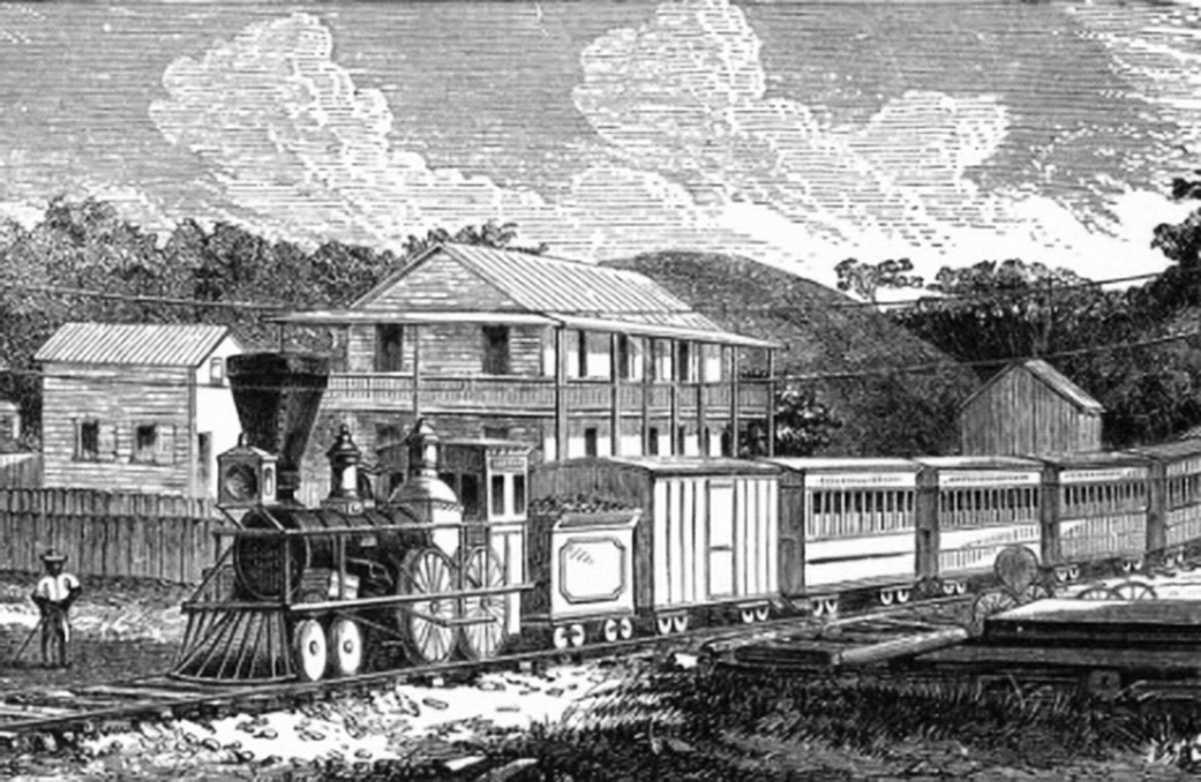
- One of the passenger trains (1955 drawing)

Details
- Date: 6 May 1856 c. 15:00pm (local time)
- Location: near the Gatun's Bridge, nine miles from Aspinwall
- Country: Panama
- Line: Panama Railroad
- Operator: Panama Railroad Company
- Incident type: carriages derailment
- Cause: riding too fast into short curves with very heavy train

Statistics
- Trains: merger of 2 express passenger trains
- Passengers: c. 900
- Deaths: 30–40
- Injured: 70–80
- Damage: 9 carriages railway track

The 1856 Panama Railroad accident was a derailment at the Panama Railroad of an express train with around 900 passengers near the Gatun's Bridge, nine miles from Aspinwall, Panama on 6 May 1856. Thirty to forty passengers lost their lives with over 70 people being injured.

The disaster is still one of the worst accidents ever of Panama Railroad. It received worldwide media coverage in the three months following the disaster.

== Background ==
The Panama Railroad is a railway line linking the Atlantic Ocean to the Pacific Ocean in Central America from Colón (Atlantic Ocean) to Balboa at the Pacific Ocean, near Panama City. The line was built half a century before the Panama Canal and the principal incentive was the vast increase in passenger and freight traffic from the Eastern United States to California following the 1849 California Gold Rush. Aspinwall was founded in 1850 as the Atlantic terminal of the Panama Railroad. In Aspinwall arrived among others the ship SS George Law that operated between the East Coast of the United States and Central America.

== Event ==
After arriving of the SS George Law, three trains departed from Aspinwall (now called Colón) in the morning of 6 May, towards Panama. A baggage train departed at 7:00 consisting of nine baggage carriers later followed by two express passenger trains that departed at 8:00 am and 8:30 pm. The first passenger train contained the cabin passengers while the second contained the steerage passengers. Both passenger trains consisted of ten carriages: nine passenger carriages with about 48 passengers per carriage and a baggage carriage. The two passenger trains consisted of a total of around 900 passengers.

After 31 miles the locomotive of the train ran off the track at the Obispo Bridge. After erecting a platform and trying for hours, the brakemen and engineers were not able to return the locomotive back on the track. As it was a single track at that point, the train was blocking the track. As they were not able to communicate they placed a sentinel and waited. The locomotive of the first passenger train did not work well and the train stopped at a switch at Matachin, around 1.5 miles before the Obispo Bridge. After arriving of the second passenger train, the locomotive was disconnected. The carriages of the first passenger train were connected to the carriages of the second passenger train. The locomotive could turn round on a turntable and the powerful locomotive of the second passenger train and was able to drew all twenty carriages without difficulty. Unrest ensued because the train could not continue along the blocking baggage train and there was no food or drink available. It was decided to drive back to Aspinwall at around 14:00. Engineer Williams was in charge of the train whom the superintendent, Mr. Center, found to be incapable of reinstating his machine.

During the return, the speed of the train was noticed by passengers, who commented that it was “dangerously fast” with the “short curves” along the track. During a curve near Gatun's Bridge, about nine miles from Aspinwall, a front carriage derailed and the seven carriages following crashed over each other. Some fell in the pond on either side of the track and were submerged. Two carriages behind those also derailed and other carriages stayed on the track. The locomotive and first carriage that were still on the track drove a little further. The track was completely torn up for some distance.

== Victims ==
Thirty to forty passengers lost their lives and over 70 passengers were injured. The exact numbers are unknown. Four people who were injured, died later of their injuries including the captain, Thos Nash from Buffalo. The dead and seriously injured people came from the first nine carriages and all were steerage passengers. There were many nationalities, including Americans, Germans, Jamaicans and people from Isthmus. Due to the impact there were many bodies separated from limbs or heads. People in the later two derailed carriages received minor injuries and people from the carriages still on the track had at most bruises.

== Aftermath ==
Many people were extremely thirsty and were even drinking from the muddy pond on either side of the track that had turned red with blood. The locomotive drove to Aspinwall to call for help. Around 4 pm a train returned with supplies and helpers, however no physicians. At 8 pm the train returned to Aspinwall with 53 wounded passengers. Many people stayed at the disaster scene overnight, also digging out bodies of the wreck in the darkness. A next train arrived the next morning at around 4:00am and drove back more wounded people and other passengers, with still wounded people and dead people remaining at the disaster scene.
