= Charles Herndon =

Charles Herndon may refer to:

- C. W. Herndon (1877–1927), American politician from Arizona
- Charles Herndon (artist), American artist
