= USS Herndon (DD-638) =

Gleaves-class destroyer

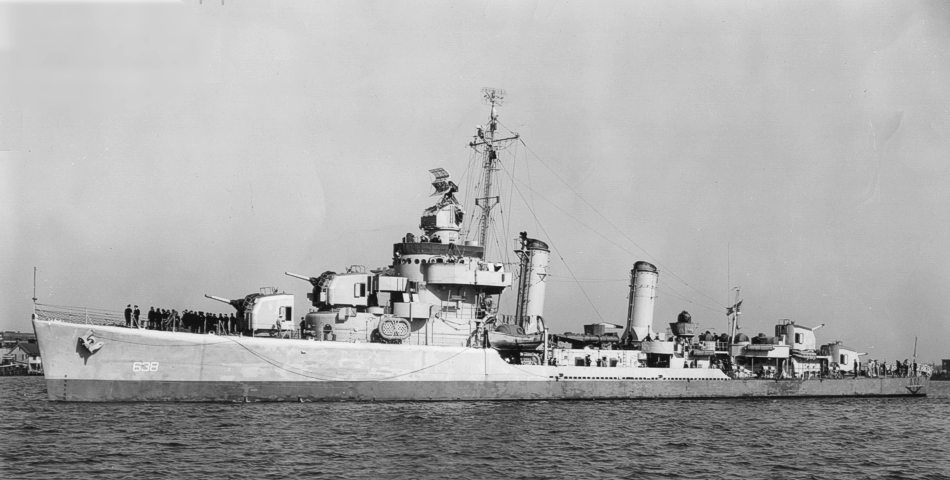
- USS Herndon (DD-638) off Norfolk, Virginia, on 30 March 1943.

History

United States
- Name: Herndon
- Namesake: William Lewis Herndon
- Builder: Norfolk Navy Yard
- Laid down: 26 August 1941
- Launched: 2 February 1942
- Commissioned: 20 December 1942
- Decommissioned: 28 January 1946
- Stricken: 1 June 1971
- Fate: Sunk as target off Florida, 24 May 1973

General characteristics
- Class & type: Gleaves-class destroyer
- Displacement: 1,630 tons
- Length: 348 ft 3 in (106.15 m)
- Beam: 36 ft 1 in (11.00 m)
- Draft: 11 ft 10 in (3.61 m)
- Propulsion: 50,000 shp (37,000 kW); 4 boilers; 2 propellers
- Speed: 37.4 knots (69 km/h)
- Range: 6,500 nmi (12,000 km; 7,500 mi) at 12 kn (22 km/h; 14 mph)
- Complement: 16 officers, 260 enlisted
- Armament: 4 × 5 in (127 mm)/38 caliber DP guns; 4 × 40 mm (1.6 in) guns; 4 × 20 mm (0.79 in) AA guns, 5 × 21 in (533 mm) torpedo tubes (5 Mark 15 torpedoes); 6 × depth charge projectors, 2 × depth charge tracks

USS Herndon (DD-638), a Gleaves-class destroyer, was the second ship of the United States Navy to be named for Commander William Lewis Herndon.

Herndon was launched on 2 February 1942 by the Norfolk Navy Yard, sponsored by Lucy Herndon Crockett, great-grandniece of Comdr. Herndon, and commissioned on 20 December 1942.

== Service history ==
=== Atlantic service ===
After shakedown off the Maine coast, Herndon escorted a convoy from New York City to Casablanca, returning to New York 14 May 1943 escorting a tanker. Sailing from Norfolk on 8 June, she reached Algiers on 24 June and prepared for a key role in the Sicilian campaign. As Allied amphibious forces under the overall command of General Dwight D. Eisenhower launched the initial strike at "the soft underbelly of Europe" 10 July 1943, Herndon performed antisubmarine patrol duty as well as fire support for Lieutenant General George S. Patton's U.S. 7th Army and General Bernard L. Montgomery's British 8th Army. Departing the Mediterranean on 3 August, Herndon on spent the next nine months escorting troopships across the Atlantic from New York to various British ports as the massive buildup for the invasion of France hit full strike. On D-Day, 6 June 1944, Herndon was off Utah Beach, down front in "Bald-headed Row" ahead of the first assault waves. Despite heavy counter fire from enemy batteries, she bombarded enemy targets ashore.

Herndon remained off the Normandy beaches providing fire support, screening troopships, and antisubmarine patrol until 19 June, when she served as a screen for Allied landings at Baie de la Seine. Further screening duties followed until 11 July, when she reported to Belfast for training as an escort in the Mediterranean. Operation Anvil was the Allies' next major operation. Herndon was part of the joint task force screening aircraft carriers on 16 August when the invasion of southern France was begun.

The destroyer remained in the Mediterranean until sailing for New York on 3 September. After two weeks of experimental operations in Chesapeake Bay for the Naval Research Laboratory, Herndon headed back toward the Mediterranean as a convoy escort on 14 October. Returning to the United States on 12 November, she conducted battle exercises in Casco Bay and escorted convoys along the Atlantic coast through February 1945. In that month. Herndon escorted President Franklin D. Roosevelt on the first leg of his voyage to the historic Yalta Conference. On 11 January 1045 Herndon collided with and sank the auxiliary motor minesweeper YMS-14 in Boston Harbor.

=== Pacific Service ===
The destroyer and her crew turned south 21 April 1945 and headed for the still-hot war in the Pacific, reaching Pearl Harbor via the Panama Canal and San Diego on 15 May. After training exercises and duty as a carrier plane guard, Herndon sailed to Eniwetok on 12 July and remained in the rear area escorting convoys between Eniwetok, Guam, and Saipan through the end of the long Pacific war.

Japanese capitulation came at last with the formal signing of the surrender in Tokyo Bay on 2 September, and Herndon proceeded to the China coast to enforce provisions of the peace. Reaching Dairen, Manchuria on 10 September, she continued to Qingdao, China 16 September. On that day Japanese Vice Admiral Kanako, and his staff came aboard Herndon to sign and implement the unconditional surrender of all Japanese-controlled combatant and merchant vessels in the Qingdao area.

=== Post World War II and fate ===
Herndon spent the fall and winter escorting Japanese prize vessels along the coast, patrolling the Korean and China coasts, and assisting the repatriation of Japanese soldiers and the movement of Chinese Nationalist troops. On 5 December 1945 she was detached from this duty to participate in Operation Magic Carpet, the transfer of troops from the Pacific to the United States, and reached San Diego via Shanghai, Eniwetok, Okinawa, and Pearl Harbor on 27 December. After disembarking some of the troops, Herndon continued on to New York with the rest, arriving 15 January 1946.

Herndon arrived Charleston on 28 January 1946 and decommissioned there 8 May and entered the Atlantic Reserve Fleet. She was moved to Philadelphia in January 1947 and in June 1965 was transferred to Orange, Texas. Stricken from the Naval Vessel Register on 1 June 1971, Herndon was sunk as a target off Florida on 24 May 1973.

Herndon received three battle stars for World War II service.
