= Herndon Historic District =

Historic district in Virginia, United States

- U.S. National Register of Historic Places
- U.S. Historic district
- Virginia Landmarks Register
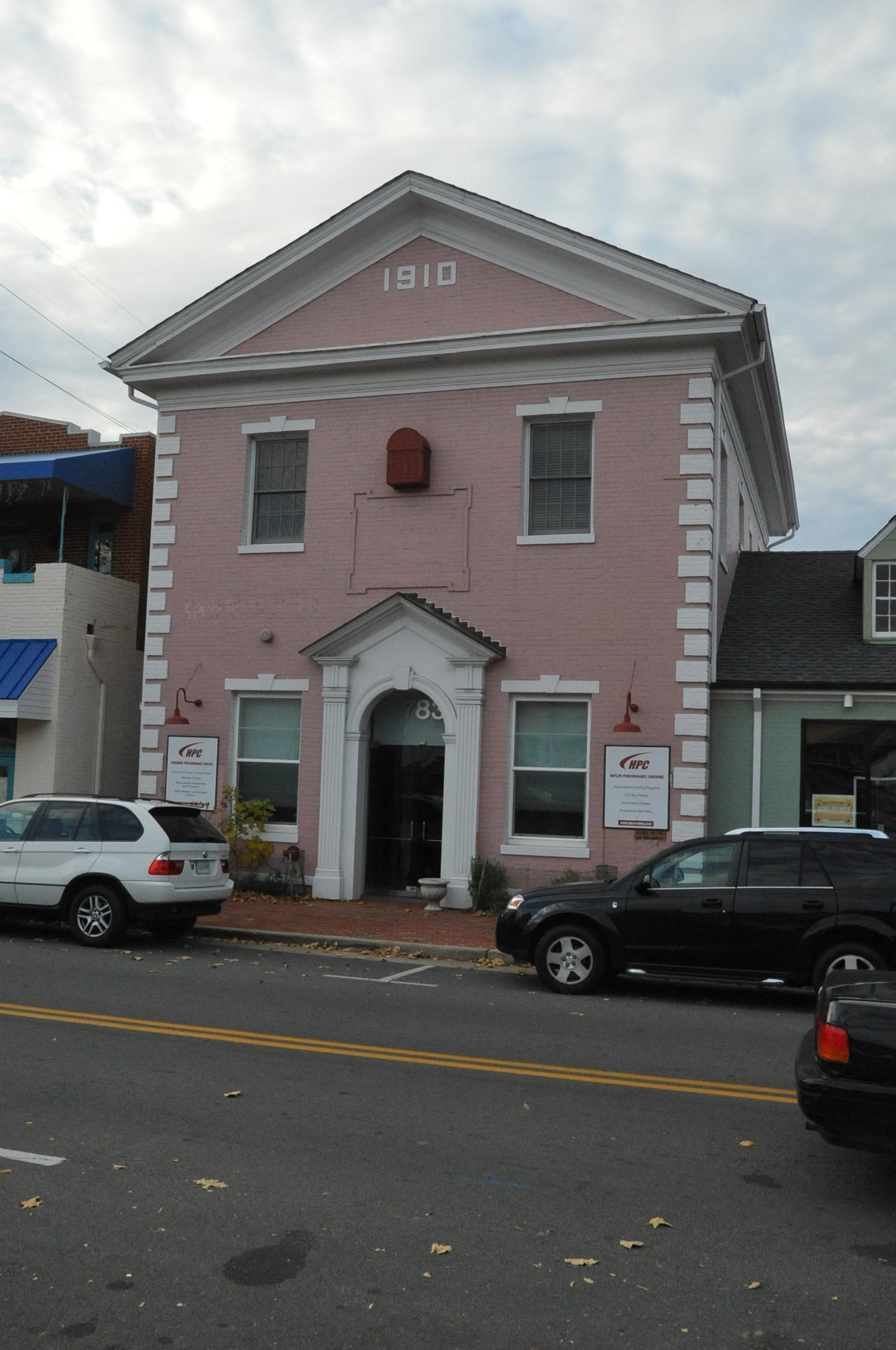
- National Bank of Herndon, Herndon Historic District, November 2012

- Location within Northern Virginia Location within Virginia Location within the United States
- Location: Roughly bounded by Locust, Spring, Pearl, Monroe, Station and Vine Sts., Herndon, Virginia
- Coordinates: 38°58′06″N 77°23′05″W
- Area: 115 acres (47 ha)
- Architectural style: Late 19th And Early 20th Century American Movements, Late 19th And 20th Century Revivals, Late Victorian
- NRHP reference No.: 90002121
- VLR No.: 235-0003

Significant dates
- Added to NRHP: January 11, 1991
- Designated VLR: February 20, 1990

Herndon Historic District is a national historic district located at Herndon, Fairfax County, Virginia. It encompasses 173 contributing buildings, 1 contributing site, and 1 contributing structure in the central business district and surrounding residential areas of Herndon. They include 104 houses, 20 commercial buildings, 6 institutional buildings, 4 industrial buildings, 30 garages, 8 barns, the pumphouse, the gas generating building, the water tower and the town square. Most of the buildings were constructed between 1890 and 1920. Notable buildings include the Town Hall (1939), Nachmans Department Store, National Bank of Herndon (1910), 5 and Dime Cafe (1920s), Sanitary Grocery Store, Loudoun Hall or the Paine House, Benjamin Detweiler House (1890), and the Bicksler House. Located in the district is the separately listed Herndon Depot.

It was listed on the National Register of Historic Places in 1991.
