= Tommy Gregory Thompson =

American treasure hunter

Tommy Thompson
- Born: Thomas Gregory Thompson; April 15, 1952 (age 74); Indiana
- Occupations: Treasure hunter, Inventor
- Years active: 1988–1996
- Known for: recovery of SS Central America
- Notable work: America's Lost Treasure (1998)

Tommy Gregory Thompson (born April 15, 1952) is an American treasure hunter known for his leading role in the 1988 discovery of the wreck of the SS Central America, a gold-laden ship which had sunk off the coast of North Carolina in 1857. When he was sued in 2005 by investors who had financed the treasure hunt, he failed to appear in court and eventually became a fugitive. Arrested in 2015, he spent over 10 years in prison for refusing to disclose the location of the remaining gold.

He is the author of a book about the discovery, America's Lost Treasure, published in 1998, and is a main character in the 1998 non-fiction book Ship of Gold in the Deep Blue Sea by Gary Kinder. A 3-part mini docuseries about him, titled "Cursed Gold: A Shipwreck Scandal", aired in 2024.

== Recovery expedition ==
Around 1983, Thompson was an oceanic engineer at Battelle Memorial Institute and managed to convince a group of investors to put up $12.7 million to search for the wreck of the SS Central America.

Thompson discovered the wreck in 1988, and then spent three years collecting the treasure. He used the Arctic Discoverer as his expedition vessel, which deployed a remotely controlled vehicle, the Nemo, which he had created.

== Legal issues, arrest, imprisonment ==
Soon after the discovery, Thompson was sued by insurance companies who claimed that they owned the wreckage. In 1996, Thompson's company was awarded 92% of the treasure.

In 2000, Thompson sold gold recovered from the Central America for $52 million. By 2005, several investors sued him, claiming that they hadn't been paid. In 2009 he reportedly had an offshore account in the Cook Islands valued at $4.16 million. When he did not appear in court in 2013, the U.S. District Court for the Southern District of Ohio issued an arrest warrant for Thompson for civil contempt for his failure to appear as directed. In 2014, the same court issued an additional arrest warrant for Thompson for criminal contempt. The investigation was assigned to Deputy United States Marshal Mark Stroh of the Southern District of Ohio. Thompson was a fugitive until U.S. Marshals arrested him in 2015 at a West Palm Beach, Florida hotel, together with his girlfriend, fellow fugitive Alison Louise Antekeier.

In April 2015, Thompson pleaded guilty for failure to appear for an earlier case and was sentenced to two years in jail and a fine of $250,000. The plea bargain included a requirement for Thompson to answer questions about the whereabouts of 500 gold coins, which he has refused to do, claiming he suffers from short-term memory loss and has forgotten their location. Since December 2015, he has been jailed indefinitely on charges of contempt of court until he cooperates.

In November 2018, Thompson agreed to surrender 500 gold coins salvaged from the wreck of the Central America, but then claimed he did not have access to the missing coins. On 28 November 2018, a jury awarded investors $19.4 million in compensatory damages: $3.2 million to the Dispatch Printing Company (which had put up $1 million of a total of $22 million invested) and $16.2 million to the court-appointed receiver of the other investors.

On December 19, 2020, The New York Times, and several other publications, published retrospective articles to mark the fifth anniversary of his conviction. Steven Tigges, the lawyer for one of the investors who sued Thompson, said he could expect release as soon as he handed over the missing funds.

On February 4, 2025, U.S. District Judge Algenon Marbley agreed to end Thompson's civil contempt charge, saying he "no longer is convinced that further incarceration is likely to coerce compliance." However, Marbley also ordered that Thompson immediately start serving the earlier two-year sentence he received for criminal contempt, a term that was delayed when the civil contempt term was imposed.

On March 4, 2026, Thompson was released from prison after serving more than 10 years.
