= SS Central America =

Sidewheel steamer ship

Coordinates: 31°35′N 77°02′W

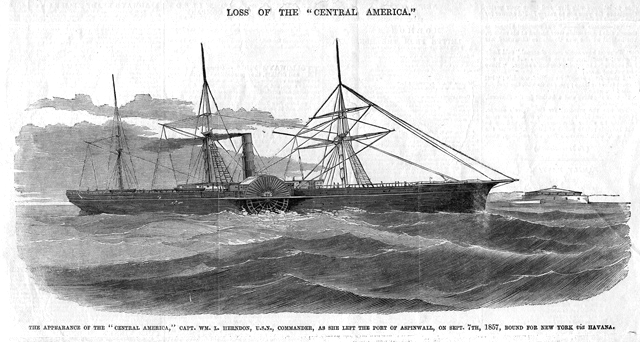

History

United States
- Name: Central America
- Operator: United States Mail Steamship Company
- Builder: Webb yard
- Launched: October 1852
- Fate: Sank September 12, 1857

General characteristics
- Tonnage: 2,141 long tons (2,175 t)
- Length: 278 ft (85 m)
- Beam: 40 ft (12 m)
- Crew: Captain William Lewis Herndon; First Officer Charles W. van Rensselaer

SS Central America, known as the Ship of Gold, was a 280-foot (85 m) sidewheel steamer that operated between Central America and the East Coast of the United States during the 1850s. She was originally named the SS George Law, after George Law of New York. The ship sank in a hurricane in September 1857, along with 425 of her 578 passengers and crew and 30,000 pounds (13,600 kg) of gold, contributing to the Panic of 1857.

== Sinking ==
On September 3, 1857, 477 passengers and 101 crew left the City of Aspinwall, now the Panamanian port of Colón, sailing for New York City under the command of William Lewis Herndon. The ship was laden with 10 short tons (9.1 t) of gold prospected during the California gold rush. The ship continued north after a stop in Havana.

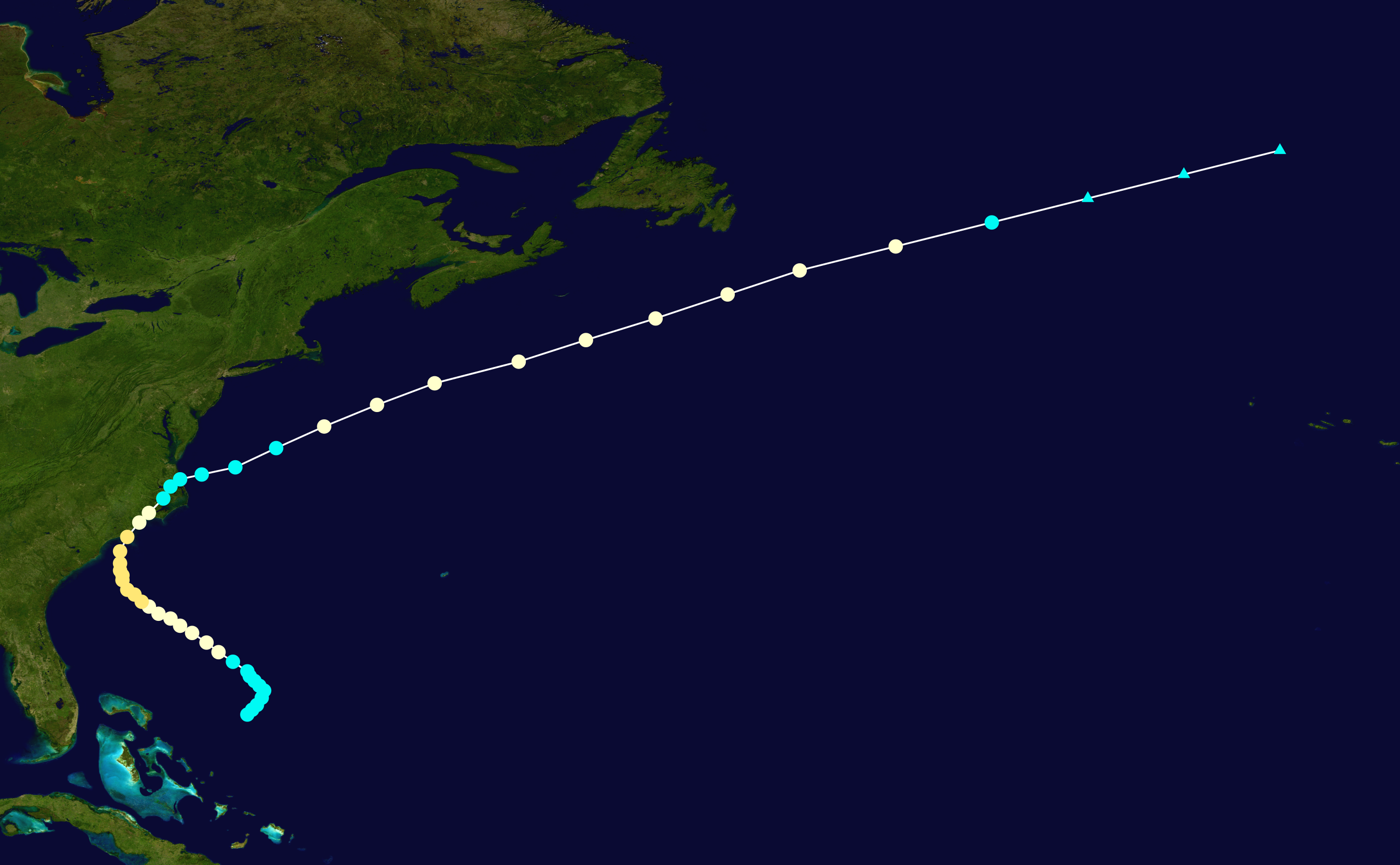
Hurricane path Map key Saffir–Simpson scale Tropical depression (≤38 mph, ≤62 km/h) Tropical storm (39–73 mph, 63–118 km/h) Category 1 (74–95 mph, 119–153 km/h) Category 2 (96–110 mph, 154–177 km/h) Category 3 (111–129 mph, 178–208 km/h) Category 4 (130–156 mph, 209–251 km/h) Category 5 (≥157 mph, ≥252 km/h) Unknown Storm type Tropical cyclone Subtropical cyclone Extratropical cyclone, remnant low, tropical disturbance, or monsoon depression

On September 9, 1857, the ship was caught up in a Category 2 hurricane while off the coast of the Carolinas. By September 11, the 105 mph (170 km/h) winds, and heavy seas had shredded her sails, she was taking on water, and her boiler was threatening to fail. A leak in a seal between a paddle wheel shaft and the ship's side sealed its fate. At noon that day, her boiler could no longer maintain fire. Steam pressure dropped, shutting down both bilge pumps. Also, the paddle wheels that kept her pointed into the wind failed as the ship settled by the stern. The passengers and crew flew the ship's flag inverted (a distress signal) to signal a passing ship. No one came.

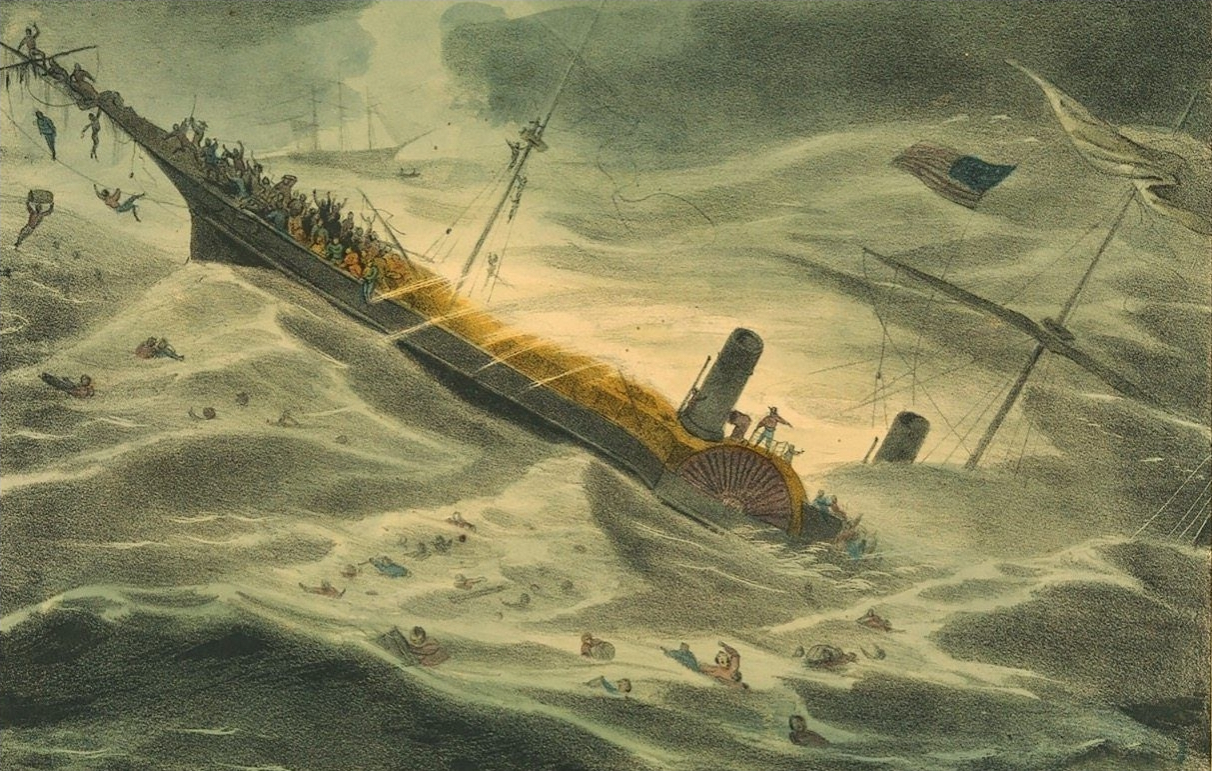
A depiction of the sinking

A bucket brigade was formed, and her passengers and crew spent the night fighting a losing battle against the rising water. During the calm of the hurricane, attempts were made to get the boiler running again, but these failed. The second half of the storm then struck. The ship was on the verge of foundering. The storm carried the powerless ship, and the strong winds would not abate. The next morning, September 12, two ships were spotted, including the brig Marine. One hundred passengers, primarily women and children, were transferred in lifeboats. The ship remained in an area of intense winds and heavy seas that pulled her and most of her company away from rescue. Central America sank at 8:00 that evening, with a loss of 425 lives. A Norwegian barque, Ellen, rescued an additional 50 from the waters. Another three were picked up over a week later in a lifeboat.

== Aftermath ==
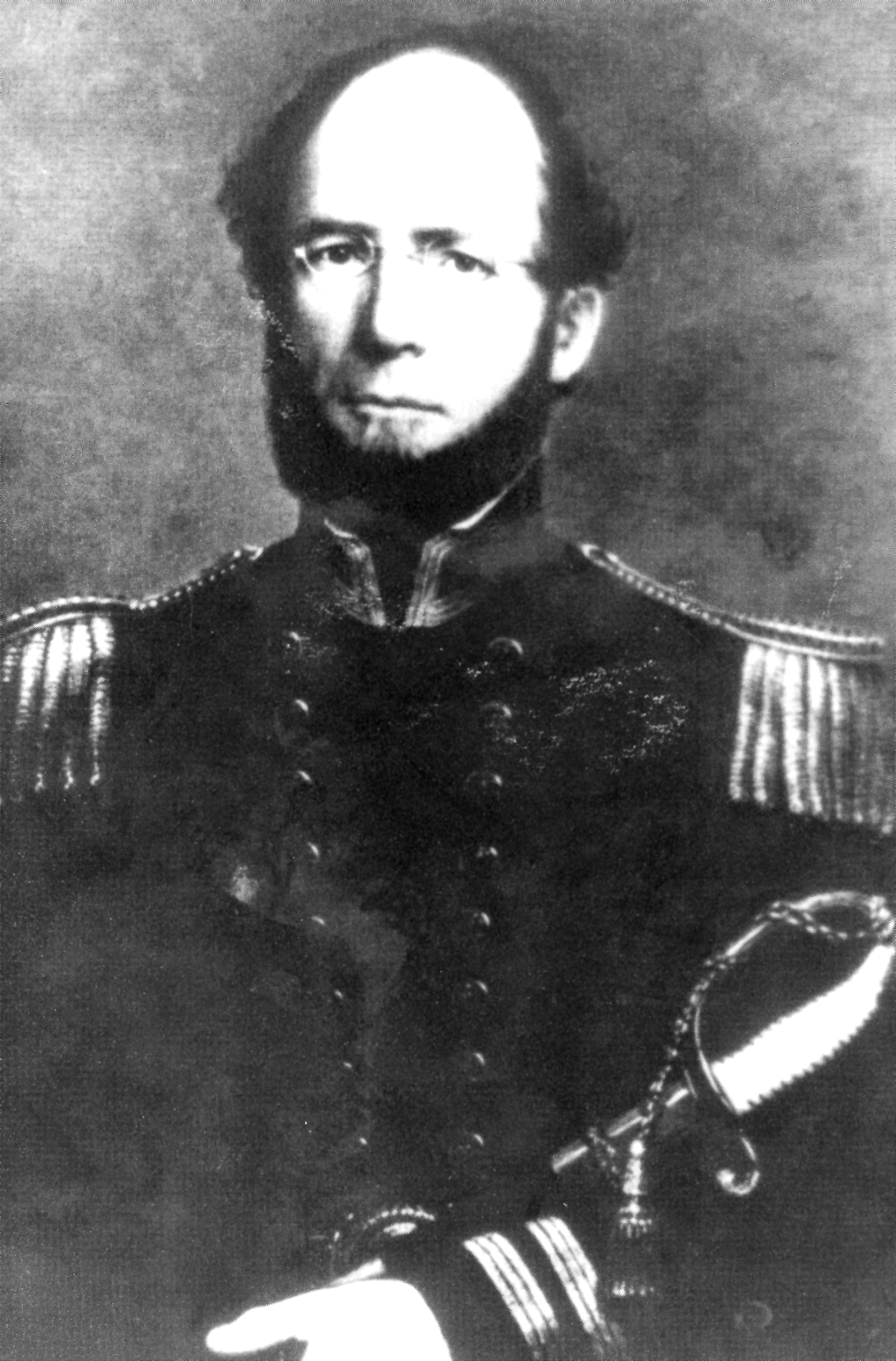
Commander William Lewis Herndon. U.S.N.

In the immediate aftermath of the sinking, the greatest attention was paid to the loss of life, which was described as "appalling" and as having "no parallel" among American navigation disasters. At the time of her sinking, Central America carried gold then valued at approximately US$8,000,000 (2025 value of $2.4 billion, based on a gold price of $165,778 USD per kg). The valuation of the ship itself was substantially more than those lost in other disasters of the period, being $140,000 (equivalent to $4,840,000 in 2025).

Commander William Lewis Herndon, a distinguished officer who had served during the Mexican–American War and explored the Amazon Valley, was captain of Central America and went down with his ship. Two US Navy ships were later named USS Herndon in his honor, as was the town of Herndon, Virginia. Two years after the sinking, his daughter Ellen married Chester Alan Arthur, later the 21st President of the United States.

== Wreck, gold, and artifacts ==
=== Thompson expedition ===
==== Discovery of wreck and recovery of gold and artifacts ====
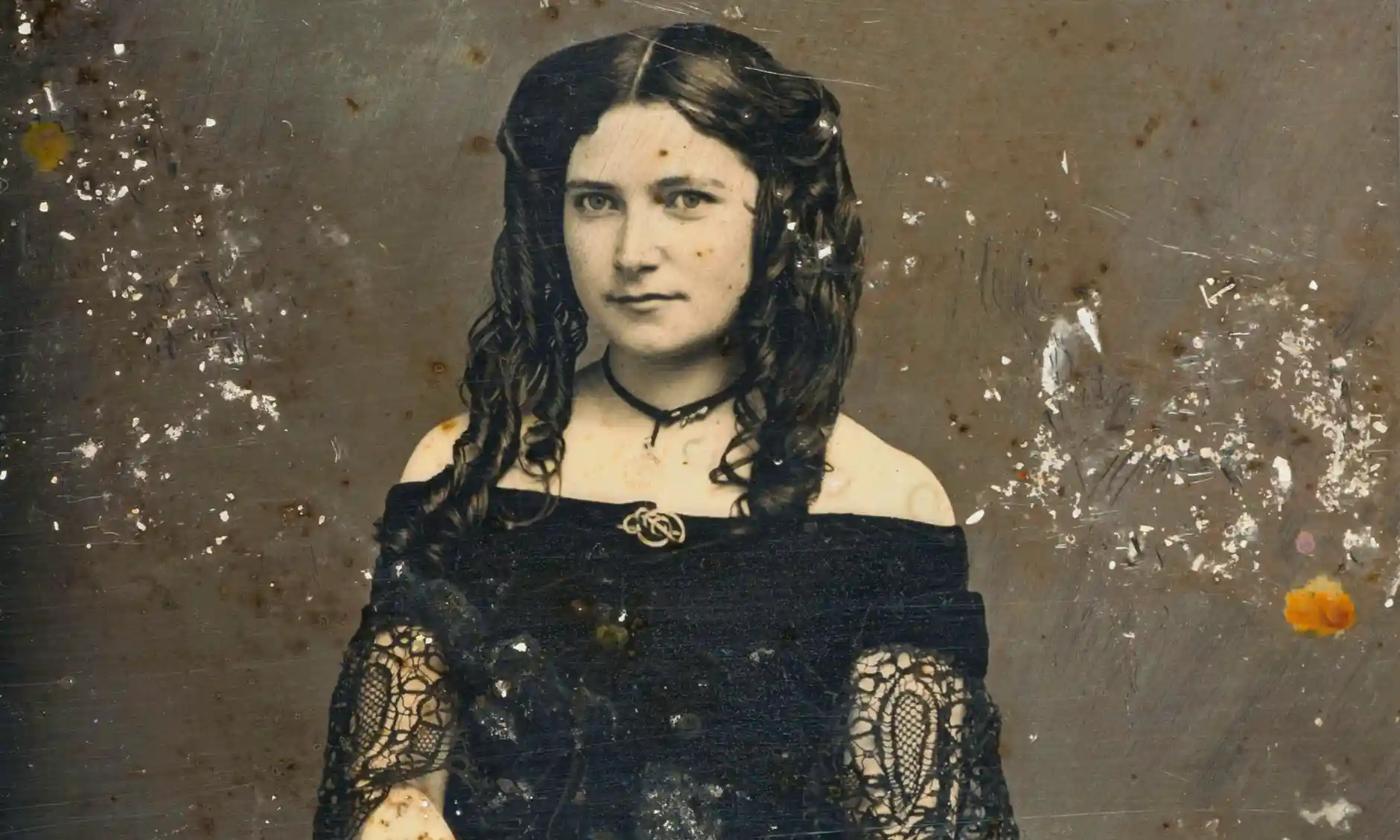
A daguerreotype photograph of a young woman found in the wreck of the ship

The ship was located by the Columbus-America Discovery Group of Ohio, led by Tommy Gregory Thompson, using Bayesian search theory. A remotely operated vehicle (ROV) was sent down on September 11, 1988. Significant amounts of gold and artifacts were recovered and brought to the surface by another ROV built specifically for the recovery. The total value of the recovered gold was estimated at $100–150 million. A recovered gold ingot weighing 80 lb (36 kg) sold for a record $8 million and was recognized as the most valuable piece of currency in the world at that time. The Columbus-America Discovery Group's eventual discovery of the wreckage may have been spurred on by initial interest by Harry John, an heir to the Miller Brewing Company fortune, who near the end of his life launched unsuccessful, haphazard treasure hunts funded by a charitable foundation he had run for decades.

==== Legal issues ====
Thirty-nine insurance companies filed suit, claiming rights because they paid damages in the 19th century for the lost gold. The team that found it argued that the gold had been abandoned. After a legal battle, 92% of the gold was awarded to the discovery team in 1996.

Thompson was sued in 2005 by several investors who had provided $12.5 million in financing, and in 2006 by several crew members over a lack of returns for their respective investments. In 2009, he had an off-shore account in the Cook Islands of $4.16 million (~$6.06 million in 2025). Thompson went into hiding in 2012. A receiver was appointed to take over Thompson's companies and, if possible, salvage more gold from the wreck, in order to recover money for Thompson's various creditors.

Thompson was located in January 2015 by United States Marshals Service agents, along with assistant Alison Antekeier, and was extradited to Ohio to provide an accounting of the expedition profits. In November 2018, Thompson agreed to surrender 500 gold coins minted from the recovered gold bars, but then claimed he had no access to the missing coins. On November 28, 2018, a jury awarded investors $19.4 million in compensatory damages: $3.2 million to the Dispatch Printing Company — which had put up $1 million of $22 million invested — and $16.2 million to the court-appointed receiver for the other investors. Tommy Thompson (now 73) was released from prison on 4 March, 2026 after serving more than a decade behind bars.

=== Subsequent events ===
In March 2014, a contract was awarded to Odyssey Marine Exploration to conduct archeological recovery and conservation of the remaining shipwreck. The original expedition excavated only 5 percent of the ship, according to a court-appointed receiver.

Universal Coin & Bullion, a precious metals dealer based in Beaumont, Texas, exhibited gold and silver coins recovered from Central America in May 2018.

Heritage Auctions sold several gold pieces recovered from the Central America at auction in 2019, highlighted by the considerable size of the 174.04-ounce (4.93 kg) Harris, Marchand & Co. gold ingot which sold for $528,000 (~$654,947 in 2025).

Central America′s 268-pound (122 kg) ship's bell — larger than most ship′s bells of its time at 2 feet (0.6 m) tall and a little over 2 feet (0.6 m) wide at its lower flange edge and embossed with "MORGAN IRON WORKS" and "NEW YORK 1853" — was discovered in her wreck in 1988. It was displayed publicly at the Columbus Museum of Art in Columbus, Ohio, in 1992; at the Columbus Zoo and Aquarium in Liberty Township in Delaware County, Ohio, in 1993; and at the American Numismatic Association′s World′s Fair of Money in Rosemont, Illinois, in 2021. It was offered as a gift to the United States Naval Academy in Annapolis, Maryland, in August 2021, and the United States Department of the Navy accepted the offer. It was positioned next to the Herndon Monument at the Academy and was dedicated in a ceremony on May 23, 2022.

== See also ==
Other successful treasure recoveries include:

- Nuestra Señora de Atocha (1622)
- SS Georgiana (1865)
- SS Republic (1865)
- RMS Republic (1903)
