= Exploration of the Valley of the Amazon =

1854 US Navy publication

Exploration of the Valley of the Amazon is a two-volume work by William Lewis Herndon and Lardner A. Gibbon. Both Herndon and Gibbon were lieutenants in the United States Navy. Volume I was written by Herndon, and Volume II was written by Gibbon. The publication was originally a report about their exploration, consisting of 442 pages. During the exploration, Herndon divided the main party into two groups so that he and Gibbon could explore different regions of the area.

== Expedition ==
In 1851, Herndon was ordered by the United States Navy to head an expedition exploring the valley of the Amazon, a vast uncharted area. Herndon, Gibbon and six others set out from Lima, Peru, on May 21, 1851.

The party split up into two groups and took different routes in order to cover a wider area and gather more information. After a journey of 4,366 miles (7,026 km), which took Herndon through the wilderness from sea level up to 16,199 feet (4,937 m), Herndon reached Pará, Brazil on April 11, 1852.

== Publication ==
On 26 January 1853, Herndon submitted an illustrated 414-page report to John P. Kennedy. The report was later published as Exploration of the Valley of the Amazon.

The two volumes, one written by Herndon and the other by Gibbon, described many unusual aspects of the valley in detail. In response, "10,000 additional copies [were to] be printed for the use of the Senate.” Three months later, another 20,000 copies were ordered; the book became an international best-seller.

Their orders were to report on all possible conditions in the Amazon region - from Lima, Peru on the Pacific coast to Para, Brazil, the mouth of the Amazon - that they would each have to traverse. The two volumes were published by presidential order.

== See also ==
- SS Central America
