= William Lewis Herndon =

American explorer (1813–1857)

Commander William Lewis Herndon
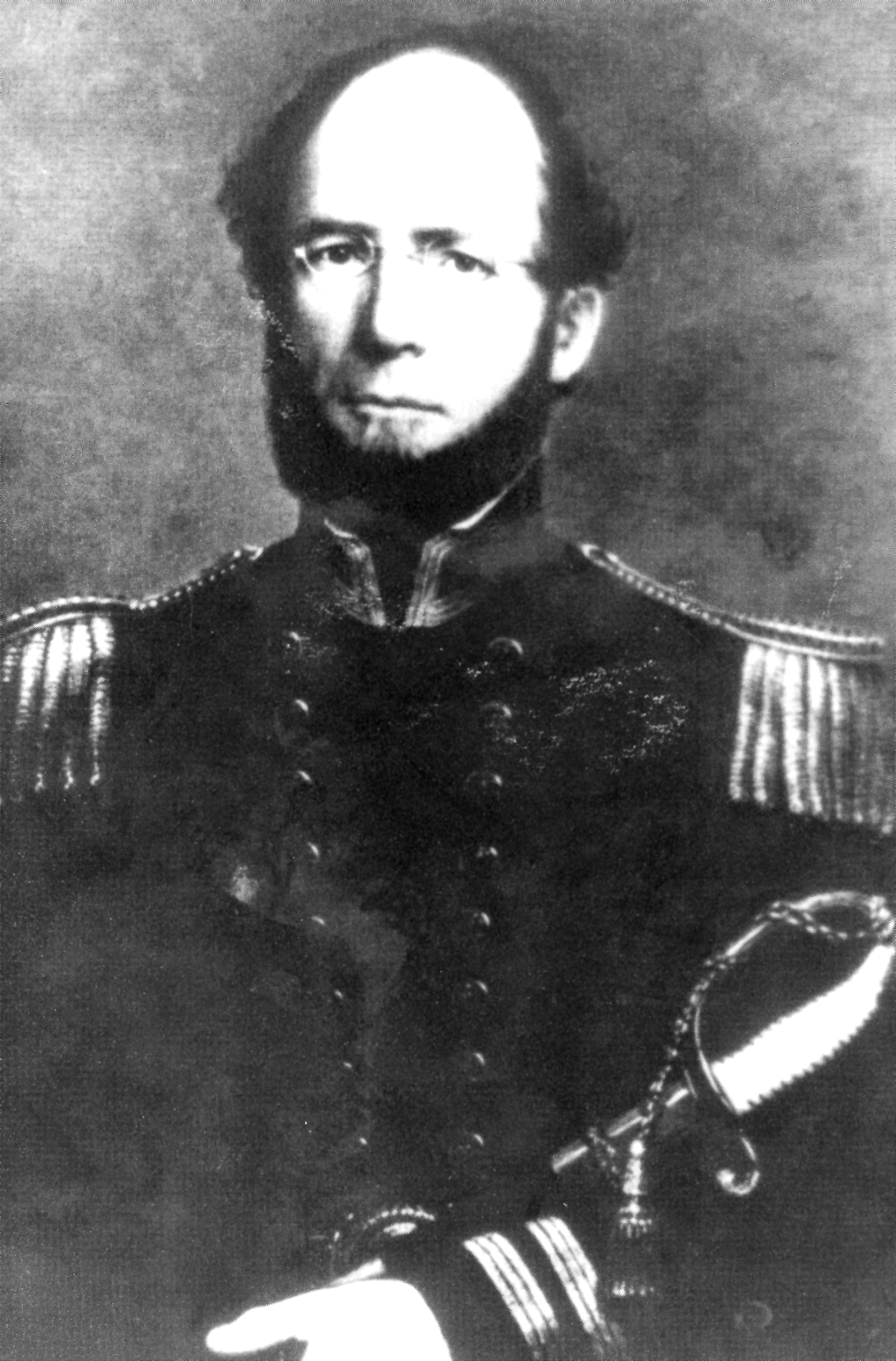
- Born: 25 October 1813; Fredericksburg, Virginia, U.S.
- Died: 12 September 1857 (aged 43); Atlantic Ocean, east of South Carolina
- Spouse: Frances Elizabeth Hansborough
- Children: Ellen Lewis Herndon
- Relatives: Lucy Herndon Crockett (grand niece)
- Military career
- Allegiance: United States
- Branch: United States Navy
- Service years: 1828–1857
- Rank: Commander
- Commands: USS Iris; USS Potomac; USS San Jacinto; SS Central America
- Conflicts: Mexican–American War

William Lewis Herndon (25 October 1813 – 12 September 1857) was an American naval officer and explorer. In 1851 he led a United States expedition to the Valley of the Amazon, and prepared a report published in 1854 and distributed widely as Exploration of the Valley of the Amazon.

He was noted especially for ensuring the rescue of 152 women and children when commanding the commercial mail steamer Central America in September 1857. During a three-day hurricane off the coast of North Carolina, the ship lost power. Herndon arranged for getting some women and children safely off the ship to another vessel. With no way to save the ship, Herndon chose to stay with more than 400 passengers and crew who drowned as the ship sank off Cape Hatteras on September 12. It was the largest loss of life in a commercial ship disaster in United States history.

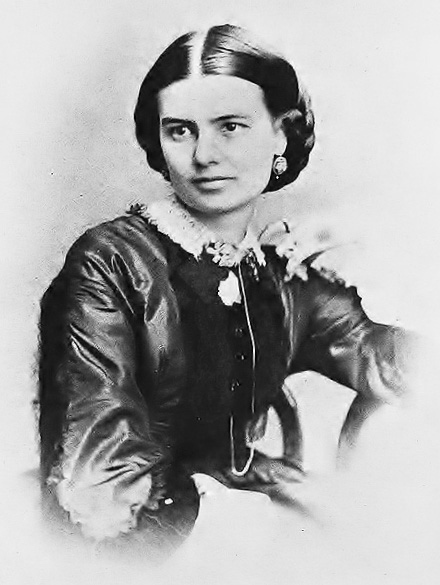
Ellen Herndon Arthur in 1859

Two years later, his daughter Ellen Lewis Herndon married Chester A. Arthur, the future U.S. president.

== Early life and family ==
William Lewis Herndon was born on 25 October 1813 in Fredericksburg, Virginia, to Elizabeth (née Hull) and Dabney Herndon. His father was a cashier. He married Frances Elizabeth Hansborough and they had a daughter, Ellen Lewis Herndon (future wife of Chester A. Arthur), born in Culpeper Court House, Virginia. His great-niece was the novelist Lucy Herndon Crockett.

== Naval service ==
Herndon was appointed midshipman on 1 November 1828. He was promoted to passed midshipman in 1834 and lieutenant in 1841. He cruised in Pacific, South American, Mediterranean, and Gulf waters from then until 1842.

From 1842 to 1846, Herndon served in the Depot of Charts and Instruments of the US Naval Observatory with his first cousin and brother-in-law, Matthew Fontaine Maury. They prepared oceanographic charts and performed other scientific work invaluable to the safe and accurate navigation of the seas.

During the Mexican–American War, Herndon commanded the brig Iris with distinction.

=== Exploration of the Amazon ===
In 1851, Herndon headed an expedition exploring the Valley of the Amazon, a vast area uncharted by Europeans, although inhabited for thousands of years by numerous tribes of indigenous peoples. The purpose of the expedition was to ascertain the commercial resources and potential of the valley. Departing Lima, Peru, 21 May 1851, Herndon, in the company of Lieutenant Lardner Gibbon and five other men, pressed into the jungles. After crossing the Cordilleras, Gibbon separated to explore the Bolivian tributaries of the Amazon while Herndon continued to explore the main trunk. After a journey of 4,366 miles (7,026 km), which took him through the wilderness from sea level to heights of 16,199 feet (4,937 m), Herndon reached the city of Pará, Brazil on 11 April 1852.

On 26 January 1853, Herndon submitted an encyclopedic and illustrated 414-page report to the Secretary of the Navy John P. Kennedy. The report was published by the Navy in 1854 as Exploration of the Valley of the Amazon. The Navy ordered "10,000 additional copies be printed for the use of the Senate." It was circulated extensively, and cited in works on ethnology and natural history.

=== SS Central America ===
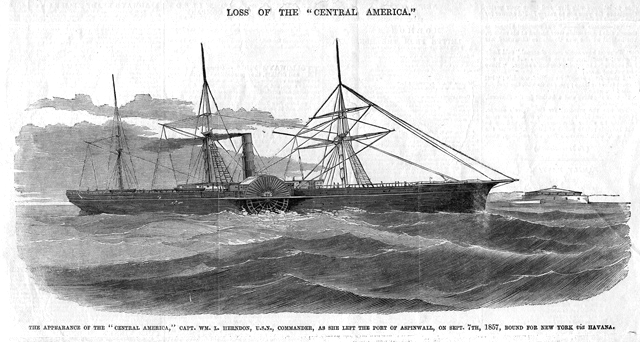
SS Central America

After two years of active service on Potomac and San Jacinto, Herndon was assigned in 1855 as commander of the Atlantic Mail Steamship Company steamer SS Central America, on the New York to Aspinwall, Panama, run. Navy captains were assigned to command the mail steamers on the Atlantic and Pacific runs; the ships were operated and maintained by companies under contract to the federal government. At the time, such mail steamers transported large quantities of gold from the California gold fields to cities on the East Coast and the US Mint in Philadelphia. (Central America had recently been renamed from George Law. Aspinwall was the American settlers' name for Colón, Panama.)

Herndon was carrying perhaps 15 tons of gold (then worth $2,000,000) and 474 passengers, many of whom were from California and were returning to the East Coast, as well as 101 crew members. A few days after leaving Cuba on 7 September 1857, the ship encountered a three-day hurricane off Cape Hatteras. The hurricane steadily increased in force. By 12 September, the Central America was shipping water through several leaks due to the ship's lack of water-tight bulkheads and general unseaworthiness. Water in her hold put out her boiler fires, eliminating steam for propulsion pumps.

Herndon recognized that his ship was doomed; he flew its flag upside down as a distress signal in hopes another ship would see them. At 2 p.m., the West Indian brig Marine arrived to help take passengers from the stricken steamer. It did not have room to take on all of the passengers and crew. Commander Herndon supervised the difficult loading of women and children into lifeboats to transfer to the Marine. He gave one of the women passengers his watch to send to his wife, saying that he could not leave the ship while there was a soul on board. Most of the women and children reached safety on the Marine. Herndon's concern for his passengers and crew helped save 152 of the 575 people on board.

Men on the Central America tried to break up wooden parts to use as floats, in hopes of surviving the sinking. Some were rescued later by passing vessels, but most of the 423 persons on board died in what was the largest loss of life for a commercial ship in United States history. Survivors of the disaster reported last seeing Commander Herndon in full uniform, standing by the wheelhouse with his hand on the rail, hat off and in his hand, with his head bowed in prayer as the ship gave a lurch and went down.

The ship disaster and loss of so much gold, which banks still depended on, contributed to the financial Panic of 1857 in the United States.

The wreckage of the ship was discovered in a 1987 treasure recovery expedition.

== Legacy ==
Herndon's memory has been honored in various ways:

- His brother officers erected the Herndon Monument in his honor at the United States Naval Academy in Annapolis, Maryland, in 1860. Central America′s ship's bell, discovered in her wreck in 1988, was offered to the academy as a gift in August 2021, positioned next to the monument, and dedicated in a ceremony on May 23, 2022.
- The U.S. Navy has named two ships USS Herndon in his honor.
- The towns of Herndon, Virginia, and Herndon, Pennsylvania, are named for him.
