= Preston House (Marion, Virginia) =

Historic house in Virginia, United States

- U.S. National Register of Historic Places
- Virginia Landmarks Register
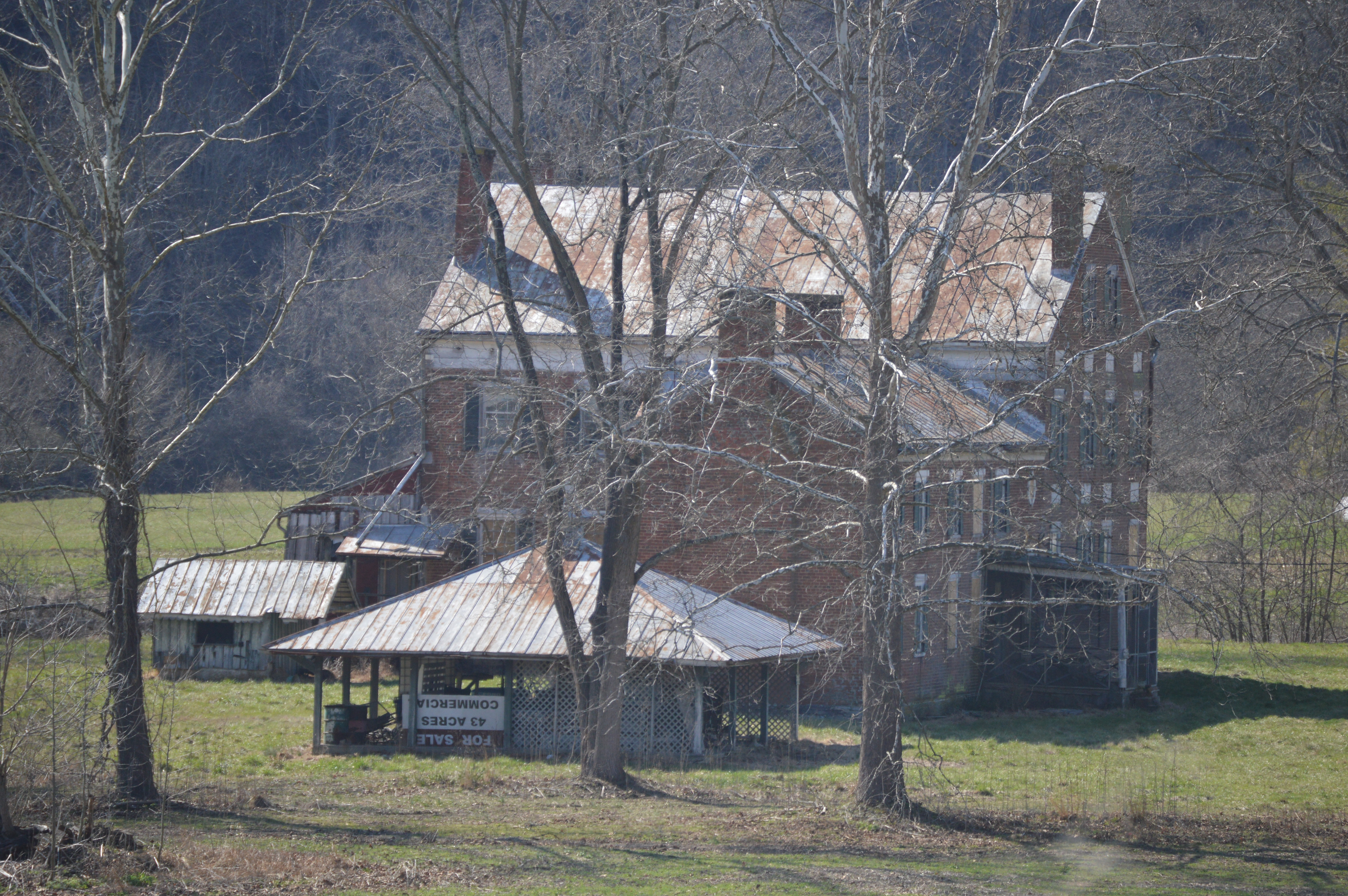
- Distant view from the east

- Location within Virginia Location within the United States
- Location: S of jct. of Rtes. 645 and U.S. 11, near Marion, Virginia
- Coordinates: 36°48′19″N 81°37′05″W
- Area: 20 acres (8.1 ha)
- Built: 1842; 184 years ago
- Architectural style: Greek Revival, Federal
- NRHP reference No.: 69000280
- VLR No.: 086-0003

Significant dates
- Added to NRHP: November 25, 1969
- Designated VLR: March 15, 2000

Preston House, also known as Herondon and the John Montgomery Preston House, is a historic home located near Marion, Smyth County, Virginia. It was built in 1842, and is a two-story, five-bay, brick Federal style dwelling. It features two closely matched doorways with a transom and sidelights, framed and divided by slender Tuscan order columns with an entablature and Greek Revival block composition above. The house was built "as a tavern or stagecoach inn along the Wilderness Road." This inn served travellers for some 22 years until 1864.

It was later the home of American author and illustrator Lucy Herndon Crockett.

It was listed on the National Register of Historic Places in 1969.

In 2022, it was announced that the house is scheduled for demolition in order to build a truck stop.
