= The Proud and Profane =

1956 film

- Original film poster
- Directed by: George Seaton
- Screenplay by: George Seaton
- Based on: Magnificent Bastards; 1953 novel by Lucy Herndon Crockett
- Produced by: William Perlberg
- Starring: William Holden; Deborah Kerr; Thelma Ritter; Dewey Martin; William Redfield; Peter Hansen
- Cinematography: John F. Warren
- Edited by: Alma Macrorie
- Music by: Victor Young
- Production company: Perlberg-Seaton Productions
- Distributed by: Paramount Pictures
- Release date: June 13, 1956
- Running time: 111 minutes
- Country: United States
- Language: English
- Box office: $3.9 million

The Proud and Profane is a 1956 American romantic drama film directed by George Seaton and starring William Holden and Deborah Kerr with Thelma Ritter, Dewey Martin, William Redfield and Peter Hansen in supporting roles. It was made by William Perlberg-George Seaton Productions for Paramount Pictures released in theaters on June 13, 1956. The film was produced by William Perlberg, from a screenplay by George Seaton, based on the 1953 novel The Magnificent Bastards by Lucy Herndon Crockett.

== Plot ==
In 1943, Lee Ashley, the widow of a Paramarine lieutenant killed in the Battle of Bloody Ridge on Guadalcanal, has joined the American Red Cross in Noumea, New Caledonia, to entertain American servicemen. Her leader at the service club, Kate Connors, had initially been reluctant to have her assigned there lest she use her position as a pilgrimage to find out about her late husband. In addition to entertaining, serving the soldiers and giving French lessons, the Red Cross women are expected to help with the wounded — which Lee initially refuses to do.

A Marine Raider battalion comes to New Caledonia after fighting in the South Pacific. Their commander, Lieutenant Colonel Colin Black, objects to the Red Cross women treating his men softly; he states that the only place for women in war are "skirts" that the men chase and the "sweethearts" that wait for them back home. He changes his mind when he tries to seduce the attractive Lee, who initially refuses his advances. Black decides to gain her interest by pretending he knew Lee's late husband and was with him shortly before he died. Though Lee despises the colonel's arrogance and demands, she is fascinated by him and falls in love with him.

Another member of the battalion is the Navy chaplain, Lieutenant Junior Grade Holmes, whom Kate notices is a changed, silent, and saddened man since she last knew him. During a battle, Holmes had gathered some Marines together in prayer. A Japanese soldier, thought to be dead, threw a hand grenade, killing several and wounding their sergeant. Black demotes the wounded sergeant because he should have known better than to let his men gather in the open and never lets him forget that his presence caused their deaths, with the bodies of the Marines shielding the chaplain from injury. Holmes's guilt is compounded by a tropical fever and exhaustion from working that has taken its toll.

Another man in the battalion is Private Eddie Wodcik, whom Kate had adopted and raised in New York. Kate loves him like her own child and he reciprocates when he is not being watched by his fellow Marines. Eddie feels that Lee looks exactly like his sister would have if she had not died and becomes her protector. Wodcik throws a disrespectful sailor to the floor using jiu jitsu.

Lee and the colonel have dinner on board an American warship. A former neighbor of Lee is now a naval officer aboard and is present at dinner. Lee and the naval officer spend the evening talking about their pre-war civilian lives in a wealthy community. An angry Black later relates to Lee his life of childhood poverty as a half-Indian in Montana. When the Raiders are shipped out for a couple of months, Lee discovers she is pregnant and that the colonel has a wife in Washington. She later learns things about her husband that she never knew. The hot-headed Wodcik also discovers what his colonel has done to Lee.

== Cast ==
- William Holden as Lt. Col. Colin Black
- Deborah Kerr as Lee Ashley
- Thelma Ritter as Kate Connors
- Dewey Martin as Eddie Wodcik
- William Redfield as Chaplain Lt. (jg) Holmes
- Ross Bagdasarian as Louie
- Adam Williams as Eustace Press
- Marion Ross as Joan
- Theodore Newton as Bob Kilpatrick
- Richard Shannon as Major
- Peter Hansen as Lieutenant (jg) Hutchins
- Ward Wood as Sergeant Chester Peckinpaugh
- Geraldine Hall as Helen
- Evelyn Cotton as Beth
- Ann Morriss as Pat
- Frank Gorshin as Harry

== Production ==
Lucy Herndon Crockett (born 4 April 1914 in Honolulu) was a Red Cross worker in the Pacific during World War II. She traveled with Basil O'Connor, national chairman of the American Red Cross, during the war as his secretary and speechwriter. An author of nine books, she wrote the 1953 book The Magnificent Bastards about her experiences with the U.S. Marine Corps.

=== Filming ===
The film was made with Defense Department cooperation in the United States Virgin Islands and Puerto Rico with production design reflecting New Caledonia in 1943. Technical advisors were Major John W. Antonelli former 1st Marine Raider Battalion and Mary Louise Dowling, Louise A. Wood and Margaret Hagan of the American Red Cross. Paramount picked up the film rights for The Magnificent Bastards in 1954 and announced Deborah Kerr for the lead. Paramount also stated they would release the film under a different title.

=== Score and original music ===
Composer Victor Young wrote the film's score. Ross Bagdasarian Sr. wrote a tie-in song The Ballad of Colin Black.

== Reception ==
Film critic Bosley Crowther of The New York Times wrote in his review: "ANOTHER exhaustive contemplation of the effects of a wartime romance on a sensitive and susceptible woman is put forth in The Proud and Profane, a William Perlberg-George Seaton production for Paramount that came to the Astor yesterday. The lady who runs the emotional gamut for all to behold in this film is an American Red Cross worker at Noumea in the South Pacific during World War II, and the gentleman with whom she dilly-dallies more than somewhat is a major of American marines. With Deborah Kerr as the lady and William Holden as the marine, two earnest and versatile performances are initially guaranteed. That is the virtue of this picture. Miss Kerr does a continuously interesting job as a nervous and self-pitying widow of a marine killed on Guadalcanal who falls for the rough, tough, ruthless major that Mr. Holden plays. And he, in turn, commands attention with the unrelenting vigor and sting that he gives to this hardbitten soldier who starts the chase with only one thing in mind."

The Christian Science Monitor praised the performances of Kerr, Holden, and the other principals. but expressed some concerns: "'The Proud and Profane' is skillfully enough acted, under Mr. Seaton's direction, to acquire a momentary validity. But its emotions are shallow, its motivations cliché ridden, and its plot developments include such a fortuitous dodge as having the colonel's alcoholic wife expire conveniently before the picture ends....It seems doubtful that 'The Proud and Profane' will do much to enhance the reputation of the team which produced 1954's 'The Country Girl'. But the damage, if any, will doubtless be no more than temporary."

== Awards ==
The Proud and Profane was nominated for two Academy Awards, for Best Art Direction-Set Decoration, Black-and-White (Hal Pereira, A. Earl Hedrick, Samuel M. Comer, Frank R. McKelvy) and Best Costume Design, Black-and-White (Edith Head).

== See also ==
- List of American films of 1956
