= Raytown C-2 School District =

School district in Missouri, U.S.

Address
- 6608 Raytown Road Raytown, Missouri, 64133; United States

District information
- Type: Public
- Grades: PreK–12
- NCES District ID: 2926070

Students and staff
- Students: 7,906
- Teachers: 631.47
- Staff: 812.5
- Student–teacher ratio: 12.52

Other information
- Website: www.raytownschools.org

Raytown C-2 School District, doing business as "Raytown Quality Schools" (RQS), is a school district headquartered in Raytown, Missouri in the Kansas City metropolitan area. It serves all of Raytown except for the slim southern part, portions of eastern Kansas City and southwestern Independence.

== Schools ==
=== High schools ===
- Raytown Senior High School
- Raytown South High School
- Herndon Career Center

=== Middle schools ===
- Central Middle School
- Raytown Middle School
- South Middle School

=== Elementary schools ===
- Blue Ridge Elementary School
- Eastwood Hills Elementary School
- Fleetridge Elementary School
- Laurel Hills Elementary School
- Little Blue Elementary School
- Norfleet Elementary School
- Robinson Elementary School
- Southwood Elementary School
- Spring Valley Elementary School
- Westridge Elementary School

=== Early childhood ===
- New Trails Early Learning Center
- Three Trails Preschool
