= Lucy Herndon Crockett =

American novelist

Lucy Herndon Crockett (April 4, 1914 – July 30, 2002) was an American novelist and artist who illustrated her own books.

== Biography ==
She was born in Honolulu, Hawaii, the daughter of Nell Botts (Johnson) Crockett and Col. Cary Ingram Crockett. William Lewis Herndon, a commander in the U.S. Navy, was her great-uncle. She grew up on military posts and was educated at a number of different schools. She lived in the Philippines while her father was serving as an advisor to Governor-General Theodore Roosevelt Jr., an experience that fed into two of her earliest two books, Lucio and His Nuong (1939) and That Mario (1941).

She served in World War II with the Red Cross, spending five years in New Caledonia, Guadalcanal, the Philippines, Japan, and Korea. Of the nine books she wrote and illustrated, several reflect her life during and after the war. The Magnificent Bastards (1953), her best-known book, was about her experiences with the U.S. Marine Corps, while Popcorn on the Ginza (1949) was about her time in occupied Japan. The Magnificent Bastards was made into a 1956 film starring William Holden and Deborah Kerr under the title The Proud and Profane. Interviewers of Crockett stated that she was "mild-looking" and seemed "too gentle for the ugliness she described" in her books.

After the war, she lived in Smyth County, Virginia, where she ran a gift shop and lived in the historic Preston House. As she got older, she became somewhat paranoid and was placed under house arrest for "threatening behavior" toward John F. Kennedy.

Her papers are held by Virginia Tech.

In 2015, the William King Museum of Art mounted an exhibition about her life, The Proud and the Profane: The Colorful Life, Literature, and Illustrations of Lucy Herndon Crockett.

== Books ==
- Lucio and His Nuong: A Tale of the Philippine Islands (1939)
- Capitan: The Story of an Army Mule (1940)
- The Mario (1941)
- Uncle Bouqui of Haiti (1942)
- Popcorn on the Ginza: An Informal Portrait of Postwar Japan (1949)
- Teru: A Tale of Yokohama (1950)
- The Magnificent Bastards (1953)
- The Year Something Almost Happened in Pinoso (1960)
- Pong Choolie You Rascal! (1963)
