= Herndon Monument =

Historic site

Coordinates: 38.9823°N 76.4859°W

- United States Naval Academy
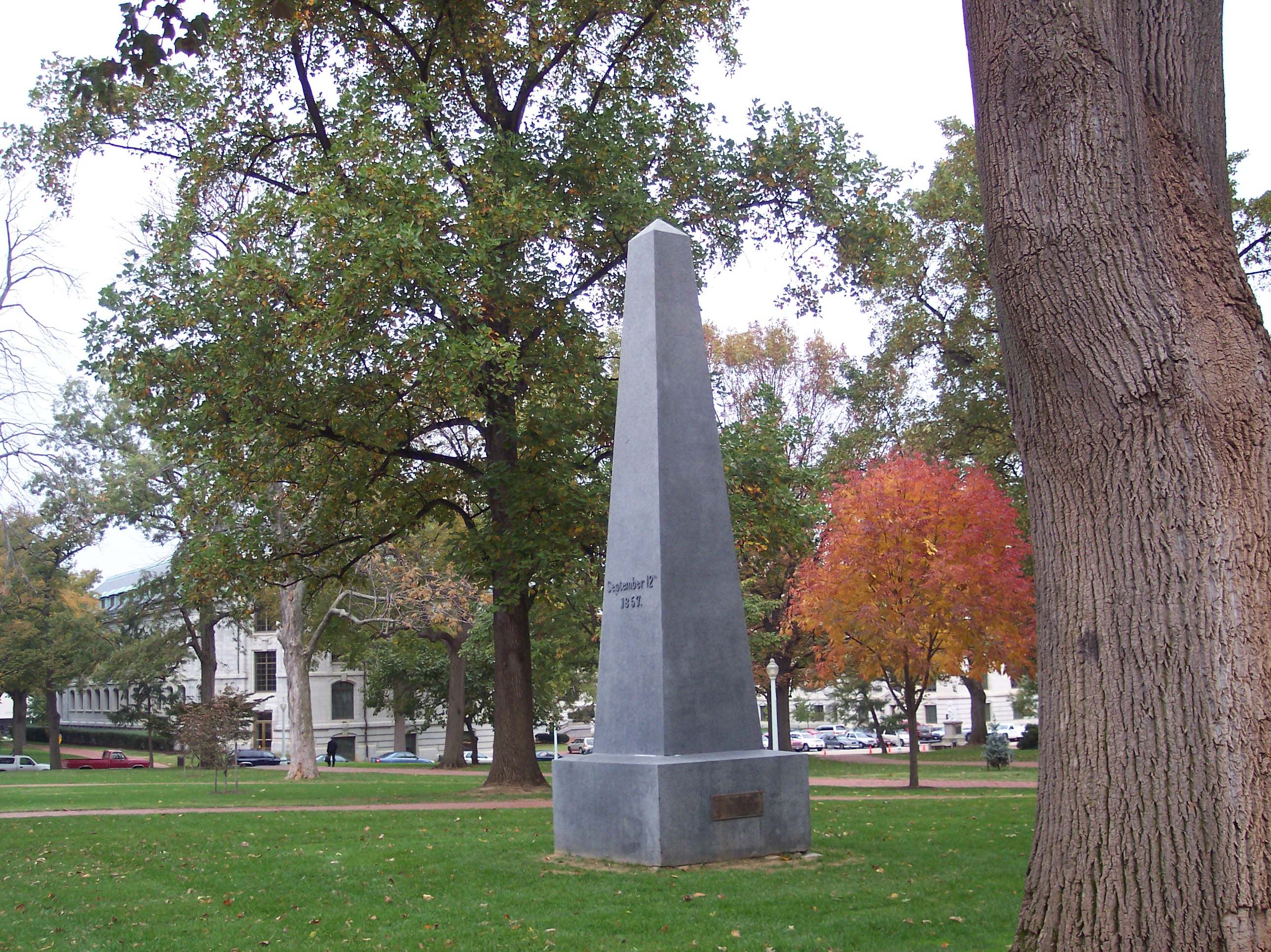
- For the loss of William Lewis Herndon
- Unveiled: 1860
- Location: Annapolis, Maryland
- Designed by: unknown
- Forgetful of self, in his death he added a new glory to the annals of the sea

The Herndon Monument is a 21-foot-tall (6.4 m) grey granite obelisk on the grounds of the U.S. Naval Academy. It was erected in memory of Captain William Lewis Herndon, who died while helping to evacuate passengers and crew from his ship, the SS Central America, as she foundered in a storm on September 12, 1857. All women and children and many of the men aboard were saved through his efforts.

== Description ==
The monument is a 400-by-71-by-71-inch (10.2 m × 1.8 m × 1.8 m) granite obelisk presented to the Academy by the class of 1860. The sculptor is unknown.

== Inscriptions ==
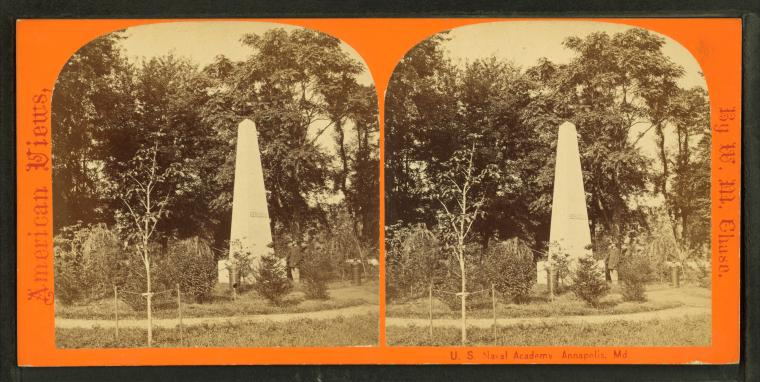
The Herndon Monument in 1868

On the monument's base, facing the Naval Academy Chapel, is a plaque:

Commander William Lewis Herndon
1818–1857
Naval Officer – Explorer – Merchant Captain

In command of the Central America, home-bound with California gold
seekers, Captain Herndon lost his life in a gallant effort to save
ship and lives during a cyclone off Hatteras, September 12, 1857.

"Forgetful of self, in his death he added a new glory to the annals of the sea" – Maury

"Maury" is Matthew Fontaine Maury, Herndon's co-worker (from 1842 to 1846), brother-in-law, and cousin.

To the right of the plaque, in raised block letters, is "HERNDON". On the opposite side of the obelisk, also in raised letters, is "September 12, 1857".

== Ship's bell ==
Central America's bell – discovered in her wreck in 1988 and donated to the Naval Academy as a gift in August 2021 – was positioned next to the monument and was dedicated in a ceremony on May 23, 2022.

== Herndon Monument Climb ==
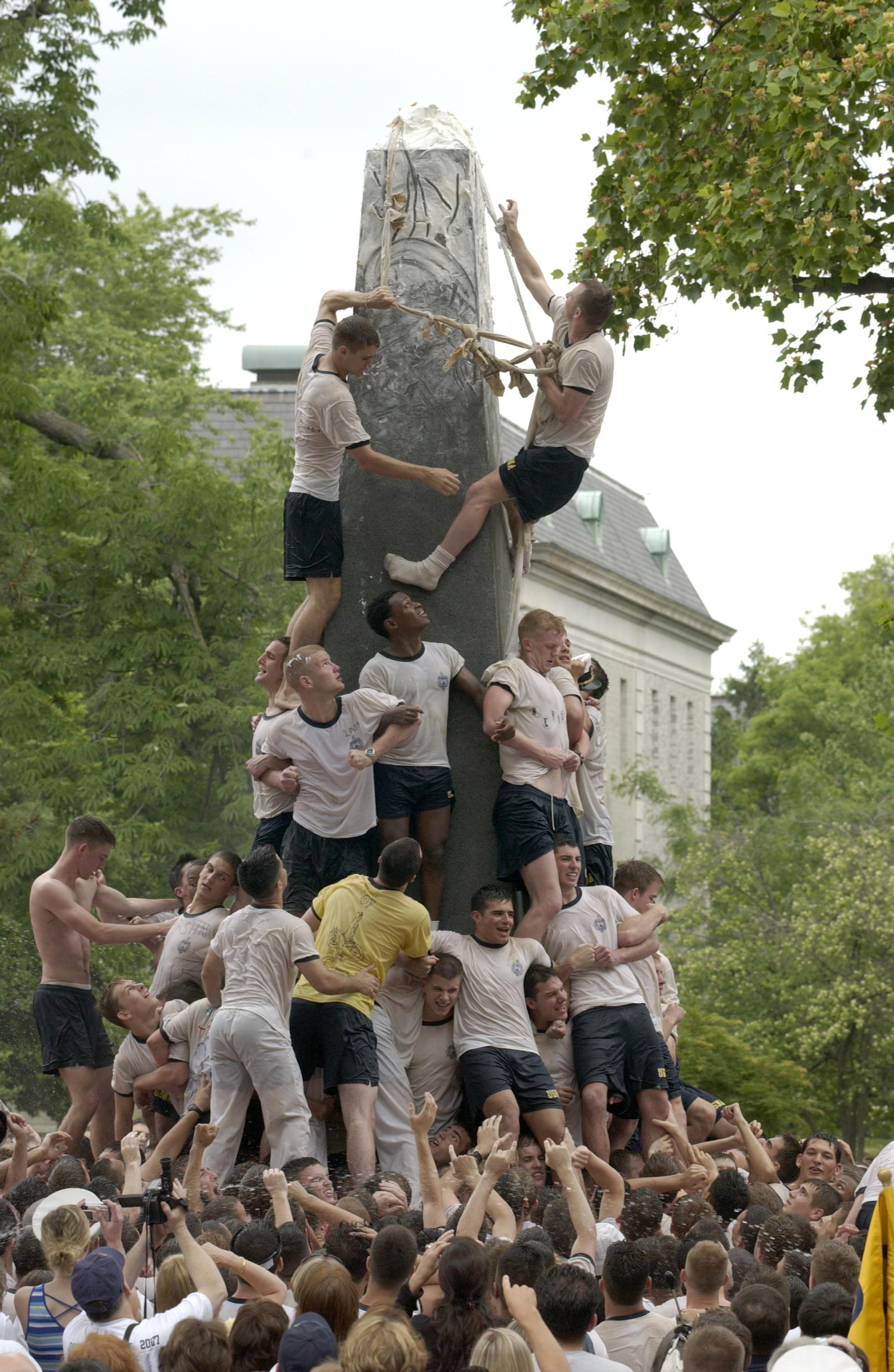
The 2004 climb

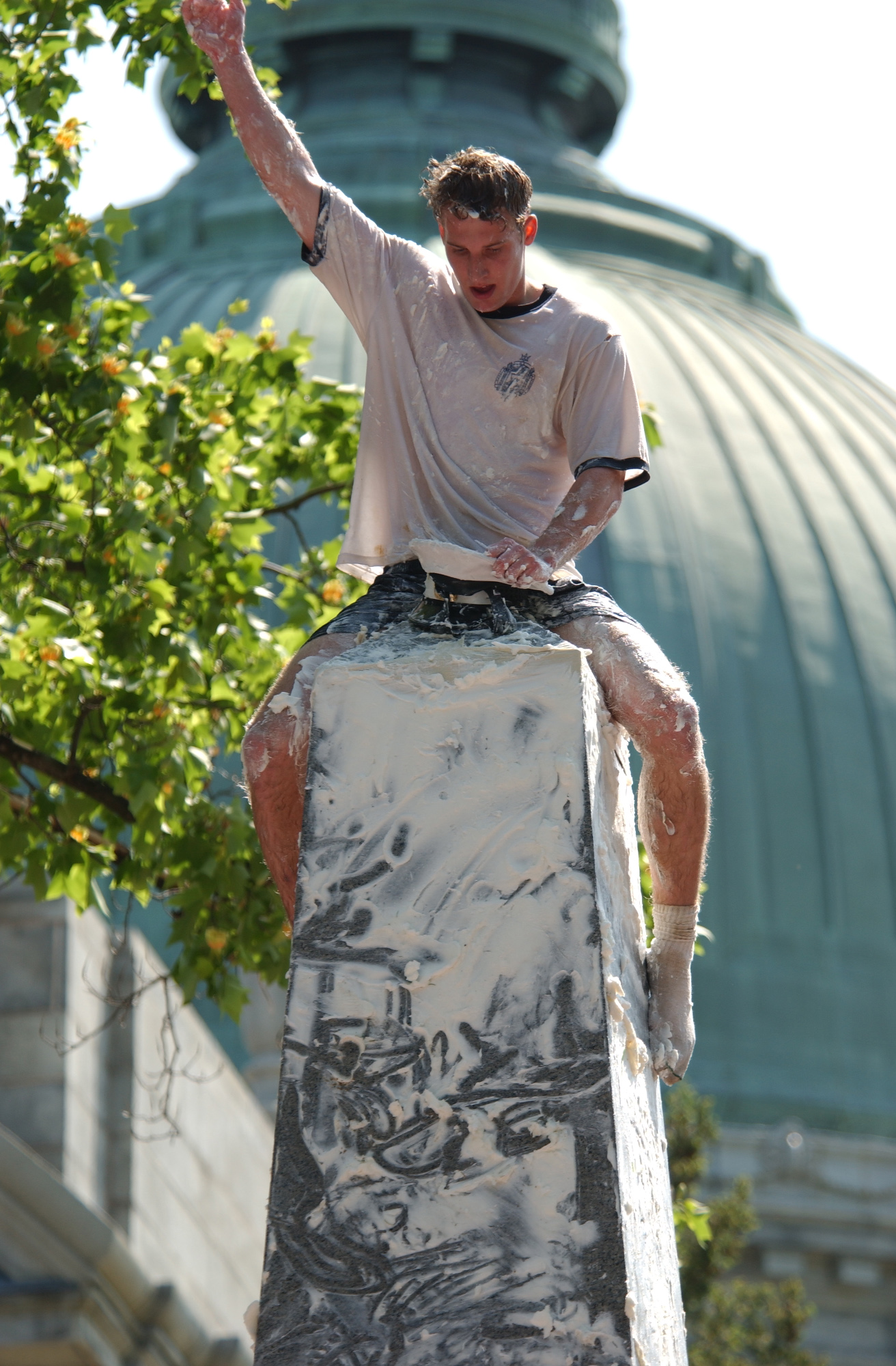
A midshipman atop the monument in 2003

The monument is the site of the annual Herndon Monument Climb, known colloquially as the "plebes-no-more" ceremony. First-year students at the academy, known as plebes or freshmen, are expected to work together to scale the monument, with the goal of replacing a plebeian "dixie cup" hat on top with an upperclassman's combination cover. Before the climb, the monument is customarily greased by upperclassmen with as much as 50 pounds of vegetable shortening, though some years have opted for no grease. This campus tradition marks the official end of the plebe year.

It is a Naval Academy tradition that the midshipman who replaces the dixie cup will be given the Superintendent's combination cover or shoulder boards. Superstition holds that he or she will be the first of his or her class to make flag rank, although this has never actually occurred.

The academy began recording times in 1959. In 1962, Midshipman 4th Class Ed Linz scaled the monument with the aid of a cargo net. Using such devices is now banned.

The record was set in 1969, when Midshipman 4th Class Larry Fanning climbed the ungreased monument in 1 minute and 30 seconds.

Midshipman 4th Class Michael J. Maynard of the Class of 1975 scaled the monument in 20 minutes in 1972, believed to be the fastest time since the tradition of greasing the monument began.

Before the 2010 Herndon Monument climb, Superintendent Vice Admiral Jeffrey Fowler publicly indicated dissatisfaction with the risk of injury associated with the climbing tradition. Fowler ordered the Brigade of Midshipmen not to slather the monument with lard "to improve the safety of the event". His successor, Vice Admiral Michael Miller, reinstated the tradition in 2011, saying, "Conducting the ceremonial climb in the same manner as so many previous classes helps to instill spirit and camaraderie among plebes and better links them to the many classes that have gone before them. The Herndon Monument climb serves as a useful event in reinforcing teamwork, organization and leadership."

== Table of recorded times ==
Scaling times of the Herndon Monument
Year Climbed	Class Year	Time (H:MM:SS)	Scaler
1950	1953		Frederick Graff
1957	1960		Jose Chavez
1958	1961		William H. Parks
1959	1962		John M. Truesdell
1960	1963	0:12:00	John Marlowe Truesdell
1962	1965	0:03:00	Ed Linz
1963	1966	0:42:00	Thomas L. Gibson
1964	1967	0:38:30	Bernard J. Racely
1965	1968	0:23:07	David W. Wallace
1966	1969	1:30:00	Gerald T. Witowski
1967	1970	1:21:00	Jim Zaborowksi
1968	1971	0:58:00	Steve DiAntonio
1969	1972	0:01:30	Larry Fanning
1970	1973		Phil Ertel
1971	1974	0:35:00	William Jackson
1972	1975	0:20:00	Michael Maynard
1973	1976	1:50:00	Lawrence J. O'Donnell Jr.
1974	1977	0:46:00	Alexander Acera
1975	1978	1:30:00	Michael T. Spencer
1976	1979	0:58:00	Dwight Crevelt
1977	1980	2:33:00	Kenneth Flack
1978	1981	1:21:00	Doug Heimbach
1979	1982	2:09:00	Jay Gallo
1980	1983	2:43:00	Bill Freitag
1981	1984	1:24:00	Andreas Bierbrauer
1982	1985	1:44:50	Sonny Dean
1983	1986	1:43:55	Kevin Delamer
1984	1987	2:22:00	Bob Kay
1985	1988	3:12:23	Chad Watson
1986	1989	1:23:07	Kenneth Grimes
1987	1990	1:51:20	Byron Hopkins
1988	1991	0:43:44	Melvyn Davis
1989	1992	1:51:30	Sam Cook
1990	1993	1:34:50	Larry Parker
1991	1994	2:36:57	Brad Cougher
1992	1995	2:21:37	James Golladay
1993	1996	1:38:20	Kepper Pickard
1994	1997	1:44:20	Ross Scott
1995	1998	4:05:17	Steve Fortmann
1996	1999	2:08:46	Joshua Caleb Williams
1997	2000	2:55:17	Zachary Guerra
1998	2001	2:22:55	Josh Stewart
1999	2002	2:07:41	Jason Fahy
2000	2003	1:19:44	Nathaniel Jennings
2001	2004	2:15:52	Alexander Lim
2002	2005	2:07:41	Daniel Knott
2003	2006	1:19:00	Daniel Shea
2004	2007	2:19:24	Philip Johnson
2005	2008	1:16:13	John David Olsen
2006	2009	1:14:15	Brian Richards
2007	2010	1:32:42	Jamie Shrock
2008	2011	2:35:59	Greg Reichel & Kristen Marie Dickmann
2009	2012	1:14:38	Schyler Widman
2010	2013	0:02:02	Keegan Albi
2011	2014	2:41:32	Matthew Dalton
2012	2015	2:10:13	Andrew Craig
2013	2016	1:32:43	Patrick Lien
2014	2017	2:19:35	Mike Landry
2015	2018	1:38:36	Javarri Beachum
2016	2019	1:12:30	Chris Bianchi
2017	2020	2:21:22	Joe McGraw
2018	2021	2:09:23	Peter Rossi
2019	2022	1:05:05	Christian Schwien
2021	2023	3:00:39	James Crossfield
2021	2024	3:41:00	Michael Lancaster
2022	2025	3:36:58	Nick McGowan
2023	2026	2:31:51	Chris Paris
2024	2027	2:19:11	Ben Leisegang
2025	2028	2:27:31	Augustus Russo
