= Nell Arthur =

Wife of United States President Chester A. Arthur (1837–1880)

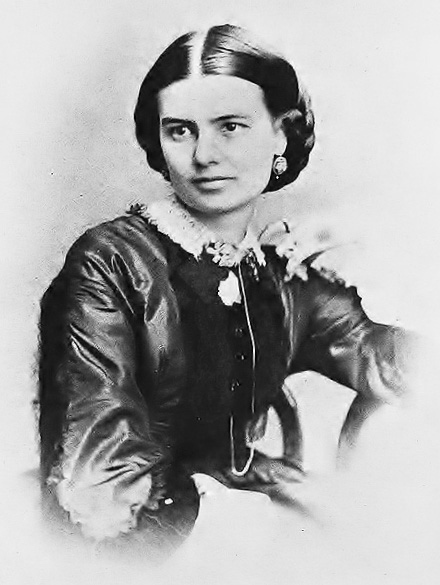
- Arthur c. 1857–1870
- Born: Ellen Lewis Herndon; August 30, 1837; Culpeper Court House, Virginia, U.S.
- Died: January 12, 1880 (aged 42); New York City, New York, U.S.
- Resting place: Albany Rural Cemetery; Menands, New York, U.S.
- Spouse: Chester A. Arthur (m. 1859)
- Children: William; Chester II; Ellen
- Parents: William Lewis Herndon (father); Frances Elizabeth Hansbrough (mother)

Ellen Lewis "Nell" Arthur (née Herndon; August 30, 1837 – January 12, 1880) was the wife of the 21st president of the United States, Chester A. Arthur. She died of pneumonia in January 1880; her husband was elected vice president the following November. He succeeded to the presidency in September 1881 when President James A. Garfield was assassinated.

== Early life ==
Ellen Lewis Herndon, called "Nell," was born in the town of Culpeper Court House, Virginia on August 30, 1837, the daughter of William Lewis Herndon and Frances Elizabeth Hansbrough(October 10, 1817 – April 5, 1878). Her father was a naval officer who gained national renown in 1857 when he went down with his ship, the mail steamer SS Central America, along with more than 400 passengers and crew. It was the largest ever loss of life in a commercial shipping disaster at the time. Herndon had safely evacuated 152 women and children to another vessel during the severe hurricane off Cape Hatteras, but his ship could not be saved. Nell was 20 when her father died. One of her father's cousins was Matthew Fontaine Maury, another notable naval officer and explorer.

Herndon was raised and educated in Washington, D.C. until 1856, when her father relocated the family to New York City. At age 16, she accompanied Matthew Maury, his two daughters and a cousin on an extended tour of Europe. A talented contralto, when she lived in Washington, Herndon's singing ability resulted in an invitation to join the choir at St. John's Episcopal Church, which she accepted.

== Marriage and family ==
Nell and the future U.S. President Chester A. Arthur were introduced in 1856 by her cousin Dabney Herndon Maury, a friend of Arthur, in New York City. Arthur proposed to her on the porch of the U.S. Hotel in Saratoga Springs, New York after a brief courtship.

Arthur, aged 30, married Herndon, aged 22, on October 25, 1859, at Calvary Episcopal Church in New York City. The day was her father's birthday. Arthur, who was from rural Vermont, is said to have learned refined dressing while at Union College in upstate New York, where he was in the debating society, and the ways of high society from her socially prominent family. The couple were known for their parties in their Lexington Avenue townhouse in Manhattan.

After relocating to New York City, Nell Arthur continued to sing as a member of the Mendelssohn Glee Club and performed at benefits around New York. The Arthurs appeared to have a strong marriage, but it was strained by both Chester's political activities, which took much of his time, and their divided loyalties on the Civil War. While Arthur was serving in the New York militia during the conflict, his wife privately sympathized with the Confederacy, for which many of her Virginian kinfolk were fighting.

The Arthurs had two sons and a daughter:

- William Lewis Arthur (1860–1863), died of convulsions at age two and a half, devastating his parents.
- Chester Alan Arthur II (1864–1937) – He graduated from Princeton University in 1885 and went on to Columbia Law School. He became a gentleman of leisure. President Arthur on his deathbed warned his son not to go into politics. Alan Arthur traveled extensively, maintained a fine stable of horses, and relied on polo for exercise. A celebrated playboy, at age 36 he married Myra Townsend Fithian, a California heiress. The couple separated after 16 years of marriage and divorced in 1927. Eventually, he settled in Colorado Springs. In 1934 he married Rowena Graves, a real estate and insurance businesswoman. From his first marriage, he was the father of two children: a daughter, Myra, who did not survive, and Chester Alan "Gavin" Arthur III (1901-1972), who married but had no children.
- Ellen Hansbrough Herndon Arthur (1871–1915) – Still a child while her father was president, she was shielded from the press. She married Charles Pinkerton and lived in New York City.

== Social prominence ==
Nell's social network among the élite families of New York widened Chester's political contacts. The pair became a prominent pairing noted for their ambition to gain the recognition and prestige that would accompany Chester's rise in politics. Among Nell’s friends were Vanderbilts, Astors, and Roosevelts. Her mother's wealth allowed them luxuries such as the three-story Lexington Avenue brownstone townhouse with expensive furnishings from Tiffany’s, which Arthur could not have afforded by himself. Freed from the need to earn enough income to support the lifestyle the couple enjoyed, Arthur was able to devote himself to the New York Republican party, eventually rising through political patronage to Quartermaster General of the New York Militia, with the rank of brigadier general during the Civil War, and Collector of the Port of New York after the war. Her singing as a soloist at the Mendelssohn Glee Club earned her renown of her own.

== Premature death ==
On January 10, 1880, Nell Arthur came down with a cold. She quickly developed pneumonia and died two days later on January 12, 1880, at age 42 in New York City, New York. She was buried in the Arthur family plot in Albany, New York.

The president's sister Mary Arthur McElroy served as hostess and unofficial First Lady for Arthur's social activities as president. She also cared for the Arthur children, who were then 16 and 9 years of age.

Arthur deeply mourned the death of his wife. After taking office as president, Arthur, who could see St. John's Episcopal Church from his office, commissioned a stained glass window dedicated to his wife at the church. He had it installed where he could view it at night, as the lights were kept on within the church. Additionally, he ordered fresh flowers placed daily before her portrait in the White House.
