= 1857 Atlantic hurricane season =

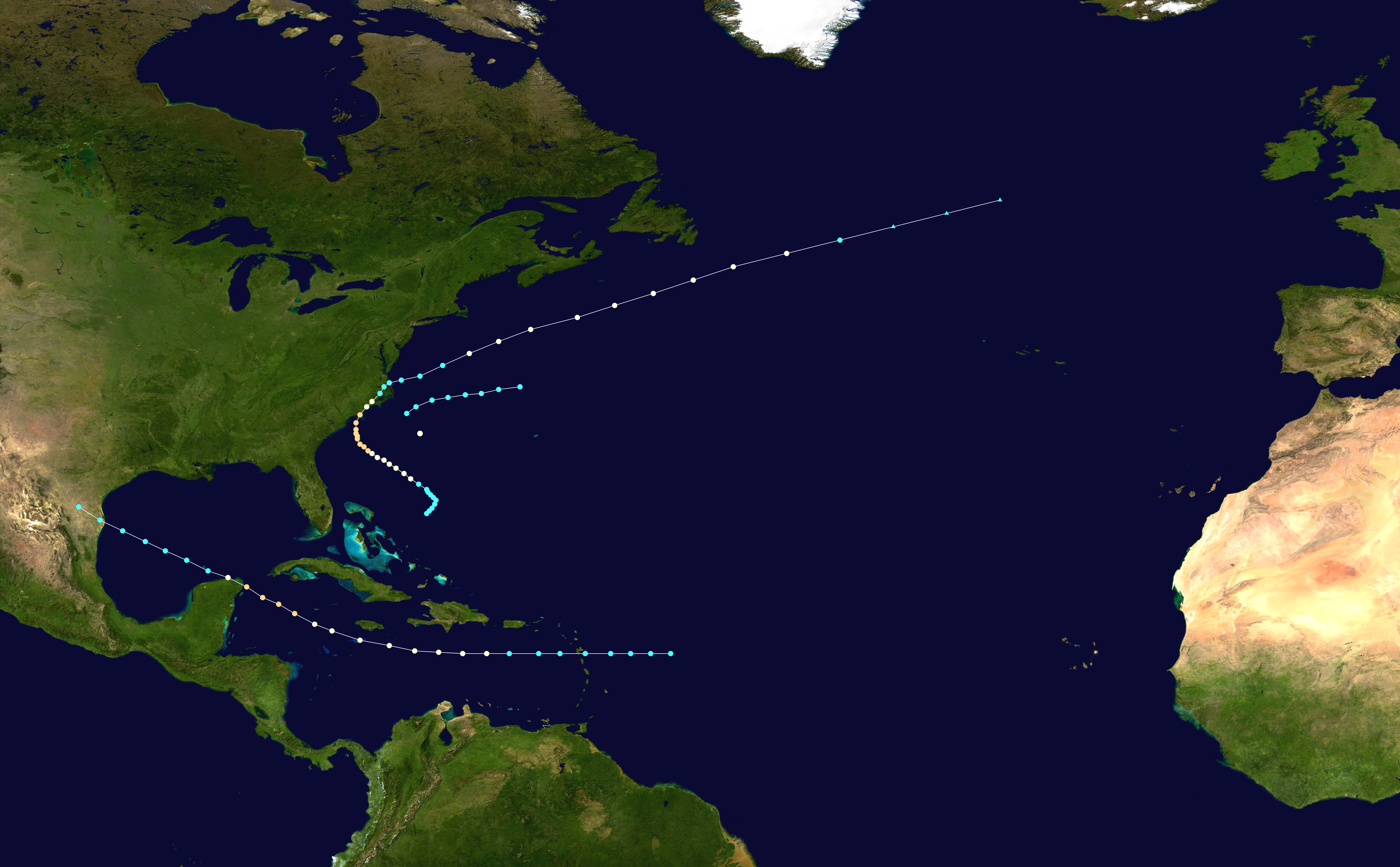
- Season summary map

Seasonal boundaries
- First system formed: June 30, 1857
- Last system dissipated: September 30, 1857

Strongest storm
- Name: Two
  - Maximum winds: 105 mph (165 km/h) (1-minute sustained)
  - Lowest pressure: 961 mbar (hPa; 28.38 inHg)

Seasonal statistics
- Total storms: 4
- Hurricanes: 3
- Major hurricanes (Cat. 3+): 0
- Total fatalities: 424
- Total damage: Unknown

The 1857 Atlantic hurricane season was an extremely inactive but deadly Atlantic hurricane season that and also had the earliest season documented by the Atlantic hurricane database to feature no major hurricanes. (Note: A major hurricane is defined as a tropical cyclone reaching Category 3 or stronger on the modern day Saffir–Simpson hurricane wind scale) A total of four tropical cyclones were observed during the season, three of which strengthened into hurricanes. However, in the absence of modern satellite and other remote-sensing technologies, only storms that affected populated land areas or encountered ships at sea are known, so the actual total could be higher. An undercount bias of zero to six tropical cyclones per year between 1851 and 1885 has been estimated. Additionally, documentation by José Fernández-Partagás and Henry F. Diaz included a fifth tropical cyclone near Port Isabel, Texas; this storm has since been removed from HURDAT as it was likely the same system as the fourth tropical cyclone. The season had an accumulated cyclone energy (ACE) rating of 46.84. (Note: There is an undercount bias of Accumulated Cyclone Energy (ACE) before the satellite era (prior to the mid–1960s), due to the difficulty of identifying storms.)

The first storm was tracked beginning on June 30 offshore North Carolina. It moved eastward and was last noted on the following day. However, no tropical cyclones were reported in the remainder of July or August. Activity resumed when another tropical storm was located southeast of the Bahamas on September 6. It intensified into a hurricane before making landfall in North Carolina and was last noted over the north Atlantic Ocean on September 17. The SS Central America sank offshore, drowning 424 passengers and crew members. Another hurricane may have existed east of South Carolina between September 22 and October 26, though little information is available. The final documented tropical cyclone was initially observed east of Lesser Antilles on September 24. It traversed the Caribbean Sea and the Gulf of Mexico, striking the Yucatán Peninsula and later Port Isabel, Texas. The storm dissipated on September 30. In Texas, damage was reported in several towns near the mouth of the Rio Grande River.

== Systems ==
=== Tropical Storm One ===
- Tropical storm (SSHWS)
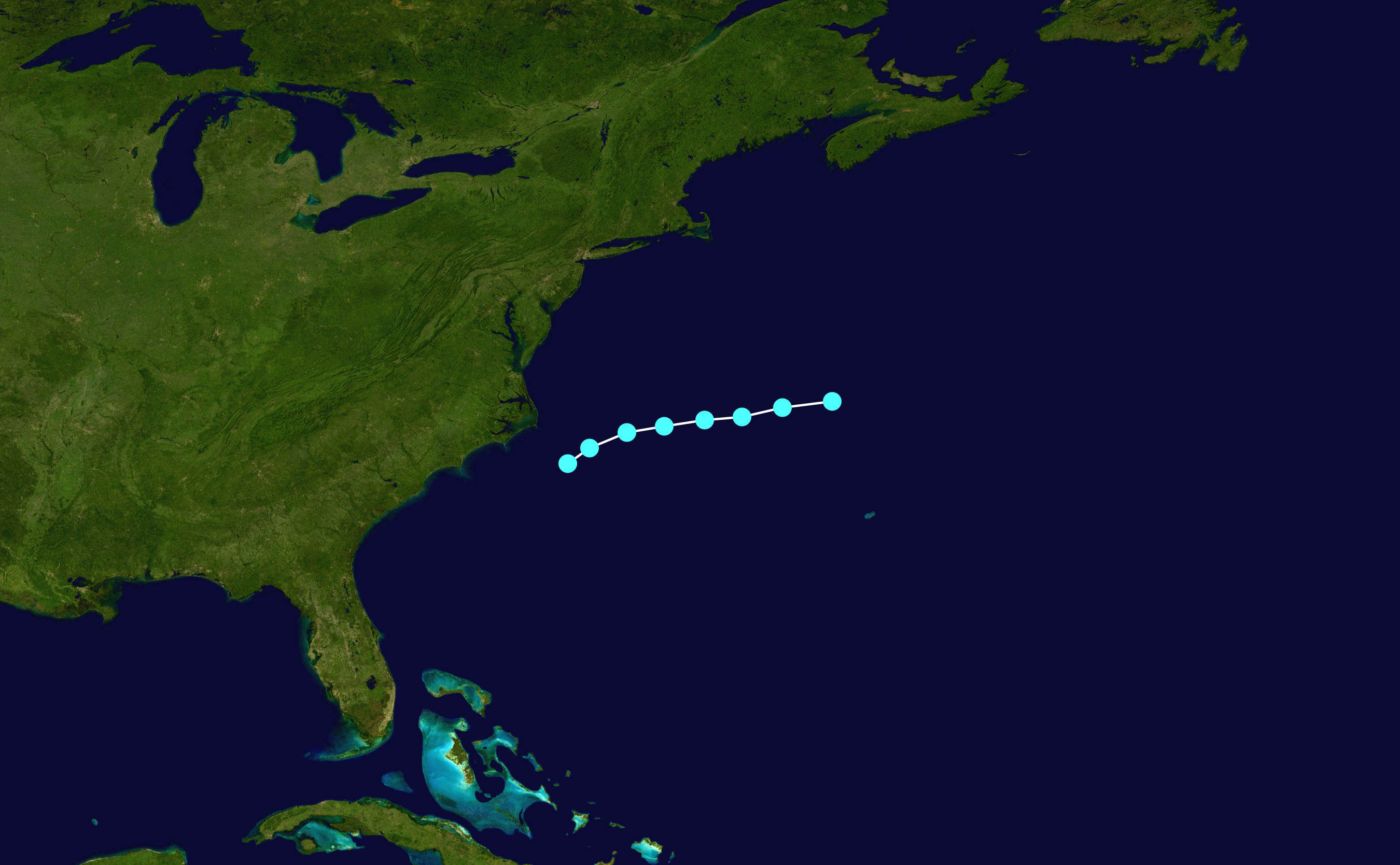
- Duration: June 30 – July 1
- Peak intensity: 60 mph (95 km/h) (1-min);

The ship Star of the South experienced heavy gales offshore the East Coast of the United States on June 30. HURDAT lists the first tropical cyclone of the season beginning at 0000 UTC, while located about 100 miles (160 km) southeast of Cape Hatteras, North Carolina. The storm moved slightly north of due east with winds of 60 mph (95 km/h). It was last noted about 265 miles (425 km) north-northwest of Bermuda by the bark Virginia late on July 1. Climate researcher Michael Chenoweth argued in a 2014 study that weather maps support the theory that a low-pressure area formed "along a sharp temperature boundary", making this system an extratropical cyclone.

=== Hurricane Two ===
- Category 2 hurricane (SSHWS)
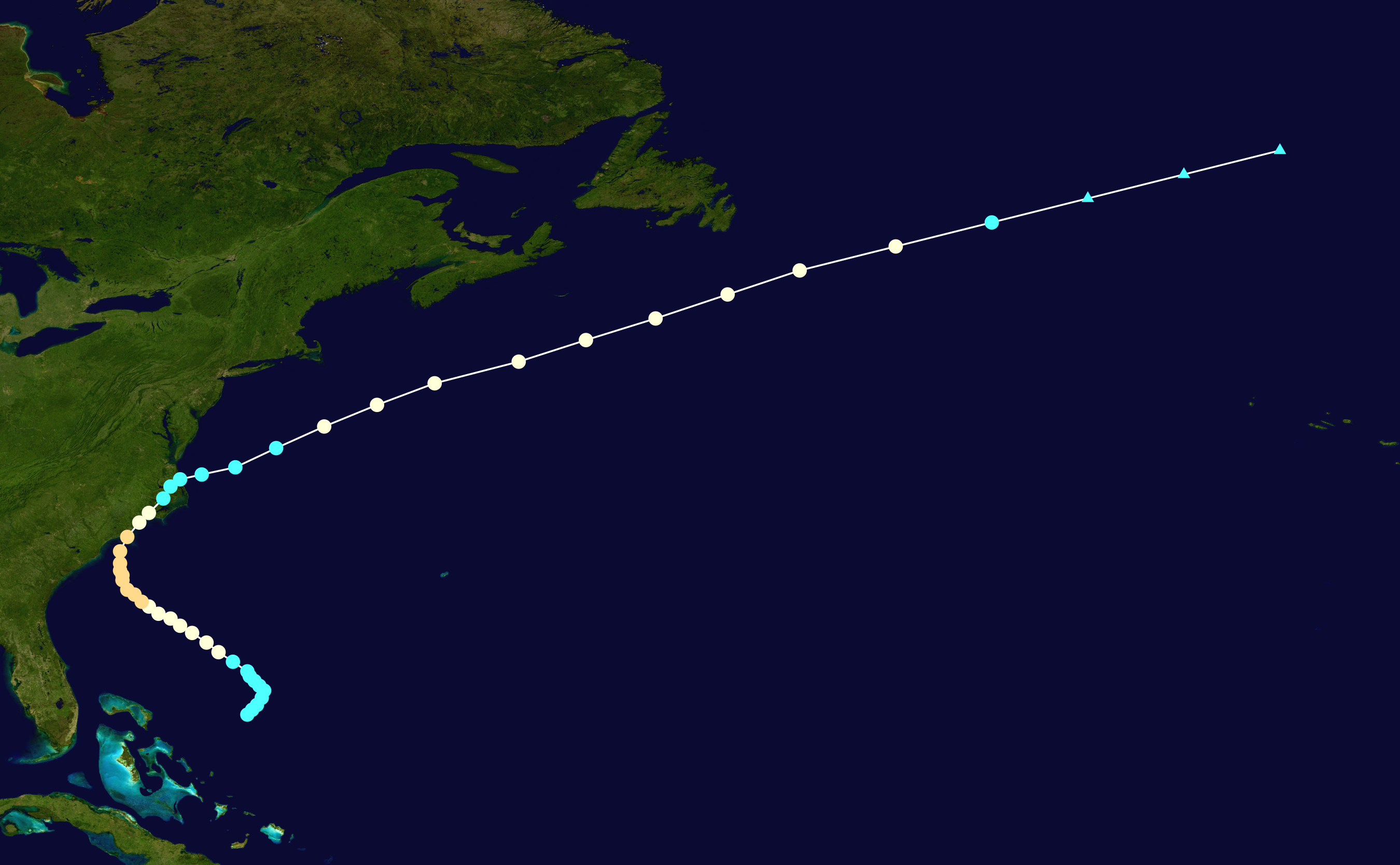
- Duration: September 6 – September 17
- Peak intensity: 105 mph (165 km/h) (1-min); 961 mbar (hPa)

The S.S. Central America Disaster Hurricane of 1857

A tropical storm was first observed east of the Bahamas on September 6. It moved slowly northwestward towards the coast of the United States and attained hurricane strength early on September 9. The cyclone continued travelling northwest along the US coast, becoming a Category 2 hurricane whilst off the coast of Georgia on September 11. On September 13 the cyclone made landfall near Wilmington, North Carolina, but then quickly weakened to a tropical storm and turned eastward into the Atlantic on September 14. Throughout September 15, whilst over water, the storm regained hurricane strength and continued northward before becoming extratropical in the mid-Atlantic on September 17.

The hurricane caused much coastal damage particularly in the Cape Hatteras area during September 9 and September 10 and then to other parts of the North Carolina coast. Flooding was reported at New Bern. Considerable wind damage also occurred. An article from the Wilmington Journal reported that, "It looked as though everything that could be blown down, was down. Fences were prostrated in all directions, and the streets filled with the limbs and bodies of trees up-rooted or twisted off.". Several ships were caught in rough seas of the East Coast of the United States. The Norfolk was abandoned in pieces 10 miles (15 km) south of Chincoteague early on the morning of September 14. Further south, on September 11, the hurricane struck the steamer Central America which sprung a leak and eventually sank on the night of September 12 with the loss of 424 passengers and crew. Also on board the ship were 30,000 pounds of gold, the loss of which contributed to the financial Panic of 1857.

=== Hurricane Three ===
- Category 1 hurricane (SSHWS)
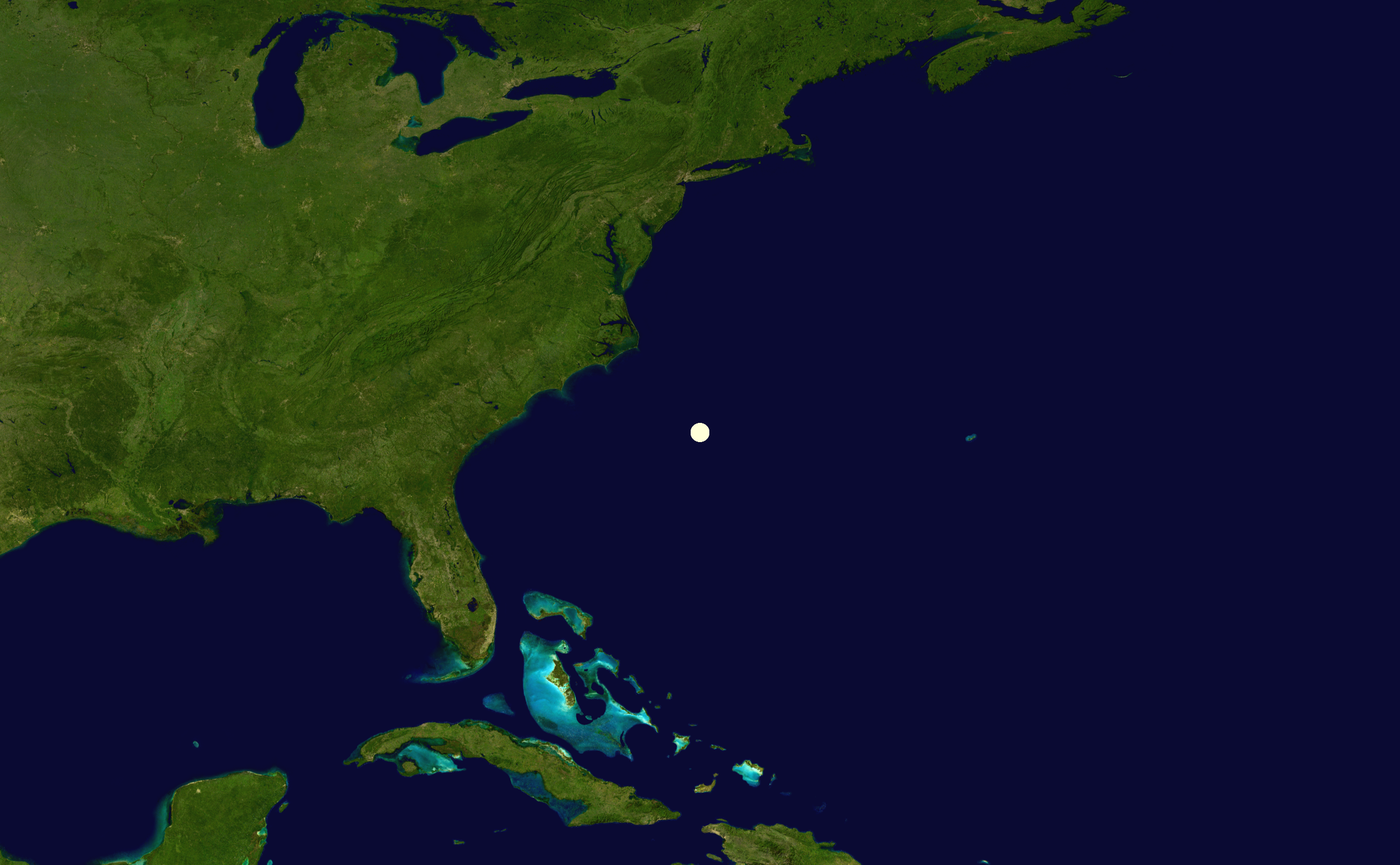
- Duration: September 22 – September 26
- Peak intensity: 80 mph (130 km/h) (1-min);

Based on reports bark Aeronaut and the schooner Alabama indicating a severe gale, Partagas and Diaz identified a Category 1 hurricane about 405 miles (650 km) east of Charleston, South Carolina between September 22 and September 26. Sustained wind speeds of 80 mph (130 km/h) were observed. No evidence was found for a storm track so the hurricane was assigned a stationary position, at latitude 32.5°N, 3.5°W. Among the ships which encountered the hurricane was the brig Jerome Knight, which sprung a leak and sunk on the night of September 22. Chenoweth considered this system to be an extratropical cyclone, instead attributing the strong winds due to a pressure gradient between a strong high-pressure system and the fourth system, which was then moving across the Caribbean Sea.

=== Hurricane Four ===
- Category 2 hurricane (SSHWS)
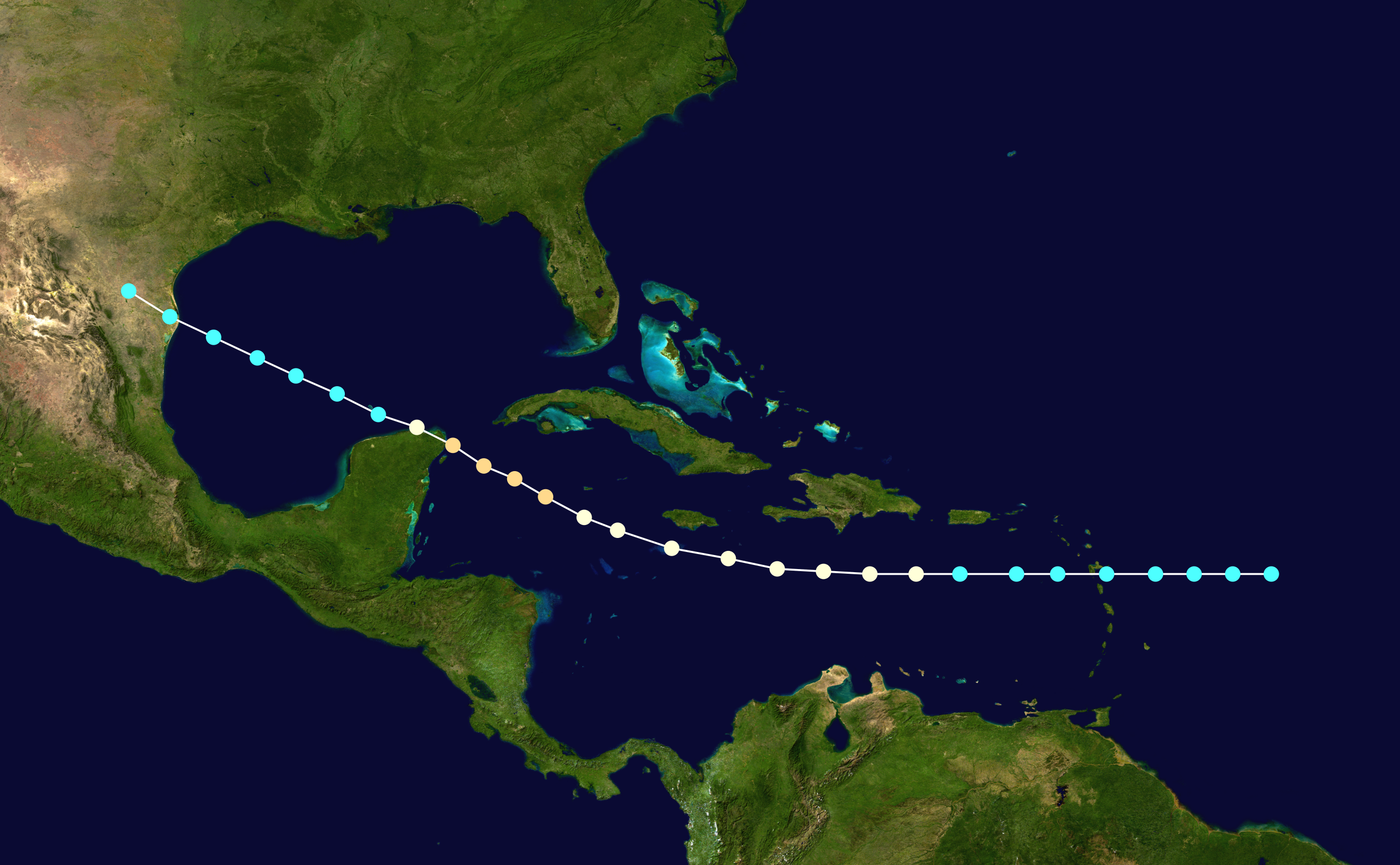
- Duration: September 24 – September 30
- Peak intensity: 105 mph (165 km/h) (1-min);

The final tropical cyclone was first observed at 0000 UTC on September 24, while located about 420 miles (680 km) east of Guadeloupe. Initially a tropical storm, it strengthened slightly before crossing the Leeward Islands on September 25. In Guadeloupe, several ships at the port in Basseterre were swept out to sea. Continuing eastward, the storm soon entered the Caribbean Sea. Early on September 26, the system strengthened into a hurricane. By September 28, it was west of the Cayman Islands and had reached Category 2 strength. The storm weakened to a tropical storm after passing Cancún early on September 29 and impacted the Gulf coastline, near the United States–Mexico border, at that strength the next day before dissipating. At Port Isabel, Texas, several hundred homes were swept away, and several towns near the mouth of the Rio Grande also sustained damage.

== Season effects ==
This is a table of all of the known storms that formed in the 1857 Atlantic hurricane season. It includes their duration (within the basin), areas affected, damages, and death totals. Deaths in parentheses are additional and indirect (an example of an indirect death would be a traffic accident), but were still related to that storm. Damage and deaths include totals while the storm was extratropical, a wave, or a low, and all of the damage figures are in 1857 USD.

Saffir–Simpson scale
TD	TS	C1	C2	C3	C4	C5

1857 North Atlantic tropical cyclone season statistics
Storm name	Dates active	Storm category at peak intensity	Max 1-min wind mph (km/h)	Min. press. (mbar)	Areas affected	Damage (US$)	Deaths	Ref(s).
One	June 30–July 1	Tropical storm	60 (95)	Unknown	East Coast of the United States	Unknown	None	
Two	September 6–17	Category 2 hurricane	105 (165)	961	East Coast of the United States	Unknown	424	
Three	September 22–26	Category 1 hurricane	80 (130)	Unknown		Unknown	None	
Four	September 24–30	Category 2 hurricane	105 (165)	Unknown	Leeward Islands, Yucatán Peninsula, Mexico, & Texas	Unknown	None	
Season aggregates
6 systems	June 30 – September 30		105 (165)	961		Unknown	424	

== See also ==
- Lists of Atlantic hurricanes
- Tropical cyclone forecasting
- HURDAT – A comprehensive record of tropical cyclone tracks since 1851.
- Atlantic reanalysis project – A project to improve historical hurricane data for past storms.
