= Herndon Depot Museum =

- Herndon Depot
- U.S. National Register of Historic Places
- U.S. Historic district – Contributing property
- Virginia Landmarks Register
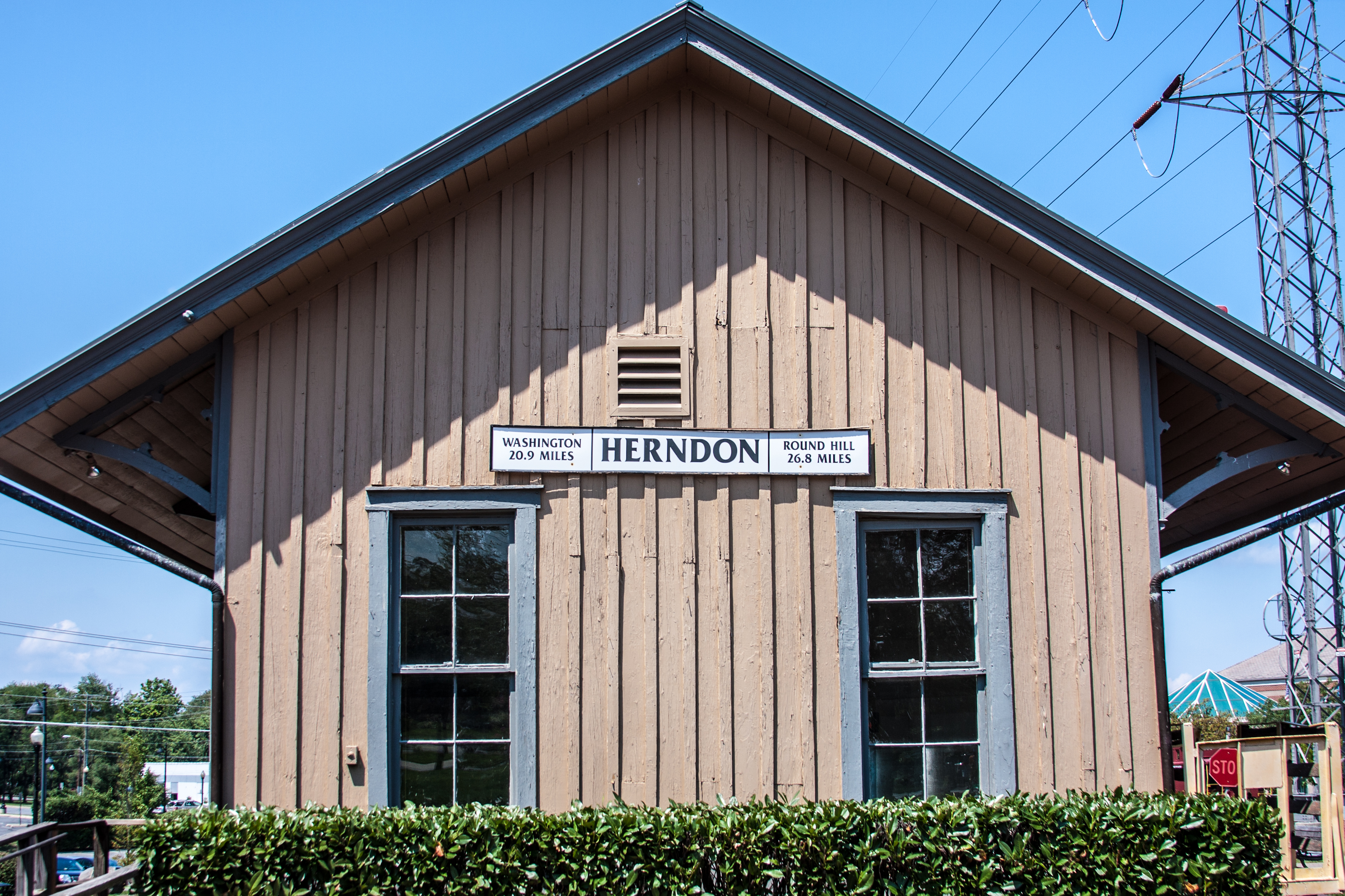
- The former Herndon Depot, now the Herndon Historical Society Museum.

- Location within Northern Virginia Location within Virginia Location within the United States
- Location: Elden Street, Herndon, Virginia
- Coordinates: 38°58′12.7″N 77°23′08.7″W
- Area: 3 acres (1.2 ha)
- Built: 1857, 1875
- NRHP reference No.: 79003039
- VLR No.: 235-0001

Significant dates
- Added to NRHP: June 18, 1979
- Designated VLR: April 17, 1979

The Herndon Depot Museum, also known as the Herndon Historical Society Museum, is located in the town of Herndon in Fairfax County, Virginia. Built in 1857 for the Alexandria, Loudoun & Hampshire Railroad, the depot later served the Richmond and Danville Railroad, the Southern Railway and the Washington and Old Dominion Railroad. In 1875, the original shed was replaced with the current depot.

The structure is located at 717 Lynn Street, at the intersection of the Washington & Old Dominion Railroad Trail and Station Street, north of Elden Street (signed nearby as Virginia State Routes 228 and 606). The building is adjacent to Town Hall Square, which contains the Herndon Town Hall, built in 1939 as a Works Progress Administration project to house all of the Town's administrative offices.

The museum houses railroad memorabilia, information on United States Navy Commander William Lewis Herndon, for whom the town was named, and artifacts from the USS Herndon (DD-198), from World War II, and from local residents. The Herndon Historical Society operates the museum.

The depot was the site of a raid that Confederate Army Captain John S. Mosby led on St. Patrick's day in March 1863. Mosby and his men surprised the Union Army picket guarding the station and captured officers, soldiers and horses with no Confederate casualties.

The railroad was an integral part of Herndon's agricultural history as large dairy farms surrounded the village. Farmers would ship milk on the railroad daily to Washington for processing and distribution. The railroad station became a center of the community. Businesses sprang up around the station, attracted by the ready access to transportation. The depot and its potbellied stove also served as a central meeting place for Herndon citizens. It was in the depot that the name for Herndon was chosen.

With the advent of cars, trucks and better roads, the railroad became less of a necessity for Herndon farmers and residents. The last passenger train rolled through in 1952 turning the depot into a place to unload freight. The last major assignment for the railway was hauling sand to be used in the concrete mix for runways at Washington Dulles International Airport. The railroad and the depot closed in August 1968.

In 1969, business owners wanted the depot torn down, calling it an eyesore, and VEPCO - who owned it - saw it as a fire hazard and was inclined to raze it; but after local historical associations argued to save it and service groups promised to work on it, it was saved. In 1970, the Herndon Historical Society was organized and began restoration of the depot, which was completed in 1974.

The depot building is a rectangular, one-story wooden vertical board and batten structure, measuring 70.5 by 20.1 feet (21.5 m × 6.1 m). Victorian style buttresses under the eaves are the building's only decorative feature. The window and door framings and the two baggage doors are original, as are the semaphore and several pieces of hardware.

The Heritage Conservation and Recreation Service of the United States Department of the Interior added the building to the National Register of Historic Places on June 18, 1979. The building's site is marked as part of the Virginia Civil War Trails Program.
