= USS Iris (1847) =

US Navy wooden steamship during the Mexican-American War

History

United States
- Name: USS Iris
- Laid down: 1847
- Acquired: by purchase, 1847
- Commissioned: 25 October 1847
- Decommissioned: 16 December 1848
- Fate: Sold, 1848; Destroyed by fire, 1856

General characteristics
- Type: Steamship
- Displacement: 388 long tons (394 t)
- Length: 145 ft (44 m)
- Beam: 27 ft (8.2 m)
- Draft: 9 ft 9 in (2.97 m)
- Propulsion: Steam engine
- Complement: 70
- Armament: 1 × 32-pounder gun

The first USS Iris was a wooden steamship in the United States Navy during the Mexican–American War.

Propelled by radial paddle wheels, Iris was built at New York in 1847 and purchased there by the Navy in the same year. She commissioned at New York Navy Yard on 25 October 1847, Commander Stephen B. Wilson in command.

The next day Iris departed New York Harbor for Veracruz, Mexico, where she arrived on 11 December. With the exception of a brief visit to Mobile, Alabama in February 1848 and a voyage to Pensacola, Florida in September, Iris remained on duty in the vicinity of Vera Cruz for the next year. During the closing months of the Mexican–American War, she assisted in maintaining the blockade of the coast of Mexico and protected the Army's water communications. Thereafter she vigilantly protected United States interests in that volatile area lest trouble break out anew.

Iris departed Vera Cruz on 8 November and arrived Norfolk, Virginia 16 December. She decommissioned there on 16 December 1848 and was sold soon thereafter.

She was documented as carrying the name Osprey on 9 March 1849. The ship was destroyed by fire at Kingston, Jamaica on 18 April 1856.
