= USS Herndon =

USS Herndon has been the name of more than one United States Navy ship, and may refer to:

- USS Herndon (DD-198), a Clemson-class destroyer, commissioned in 1920 and transferred to the Royal Navy as HMS Churchill
- USS Herndon (DD-638), a Gleaves-class destroyer, commissioned in 1942 and decommissioned in 1946
- USS Raymon W. Herndon (APD-121), a high-speed transport, in commission from 1944 to 1946
