= Charles Herndon (artist) =

American sculptor

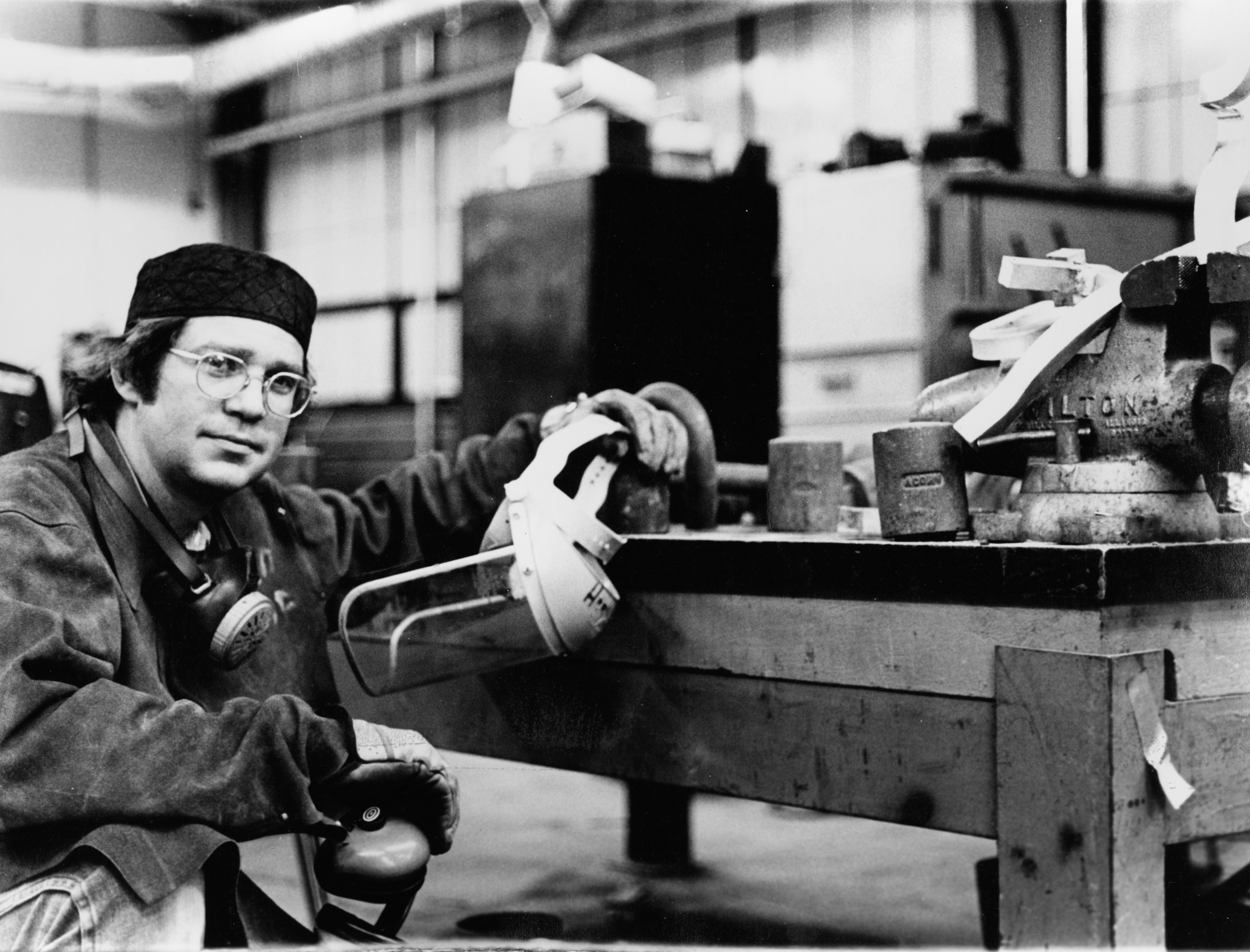
- Education: BFA, Sculpture, Cleveland Institute of Art
- Awards: Coast Guard Public Service Commendation
- Website: http://www.charlesherndon.com/

Charles "Chuck" Herndon is an American artist, creating sculptures in stone, metal, and wood, as well as works in painting and photography. He recently retired from Columbus College of Art and Design as Professor Emeritus and presently works out of his studios on Kelleys Island in Lake Erie: a sculpture studio built in 1980 and a painting and photography studio built in 2000.

Charles Herndon has a BFA in Sculpture from the Cleveland Institute of Art.

In 2007, Charles Herndon rescued a boy who survived a plane crash just off of Kelleys Island. In recognition for his actions, he was awarded a Coast Guard Public Service Commendation for heroism.
