= Herndon Career Center =

School in Missouri, U.S.

Coordinates: 38°58′33″N 94°26′52″W

Herndon Career Center is a career and technical high school in Raytown, Missouri, United States.

It is operated by the Raytown C-2 School District.

Cheryl Reichert is director of the school.
