= Herndon High School (Kansas) =

Location
- Herndon, KS
- Coordinates: 39°54′40″N 100°47′00″W

Information
- School type: Public, high school
- Established: 1912 or 1915
- Closed: 2004
- School district: Unified School District No. 317
- Grades: 9-12
- Enrollment: 200
- Campus: Urban
- Colors: Blue and Yellow
- Mascot: Beaver
- Website: School Website

Herndon High School is a former high school located in Herndon, Kansas, U.S., which served students in grades 9–12. Herndon High School was the only high school within the city limits of Herndon, Kansas. The school colors were blue and yellow and the school mascot was a Beaver. The average annual enrollment was approximately 200 students from several communities. Herndon High School was established in either 1912 or 1915. A new building was erected in the spring of 1917 because of the growing population of the city. In 1923, Herndon High School became Herndon Rural High School District #2. The school was rebuilt in 1949 and classes were held at St. Mary's High School. Classes resumed at the rebuilt high school in 1950. This remained until the fall of 2003 when the decision was made to consolidate with Atwood USD #318. The new district that was formed is now Unified School District #105 and Rawlins County Junior-Senior High School.

== Extracurricular activities ==
=== Athletics ===
The extracurricular activities offered at Herndon High School were small and limited due to the school's small size. The Beavers competed as a 1A school, the smallest classification in Kansas according to the Kansas State High School Activities Association. Throughout its history, Herndon won a few state championships in various sports. Due to the consolidation of Herndon High School, Rawlins County Junior-Senior High School history is seen as a continuation of Herndon High in terms of athletics.

=== State championships ===
State Championships
Season	Sport	Number of Championships	Year
Spring	Track and Field, Boys	1	2007
Spring	Track and Field, Girls	2	2007, 2008
Total		3	
