= USS Raymon W. Herndon =

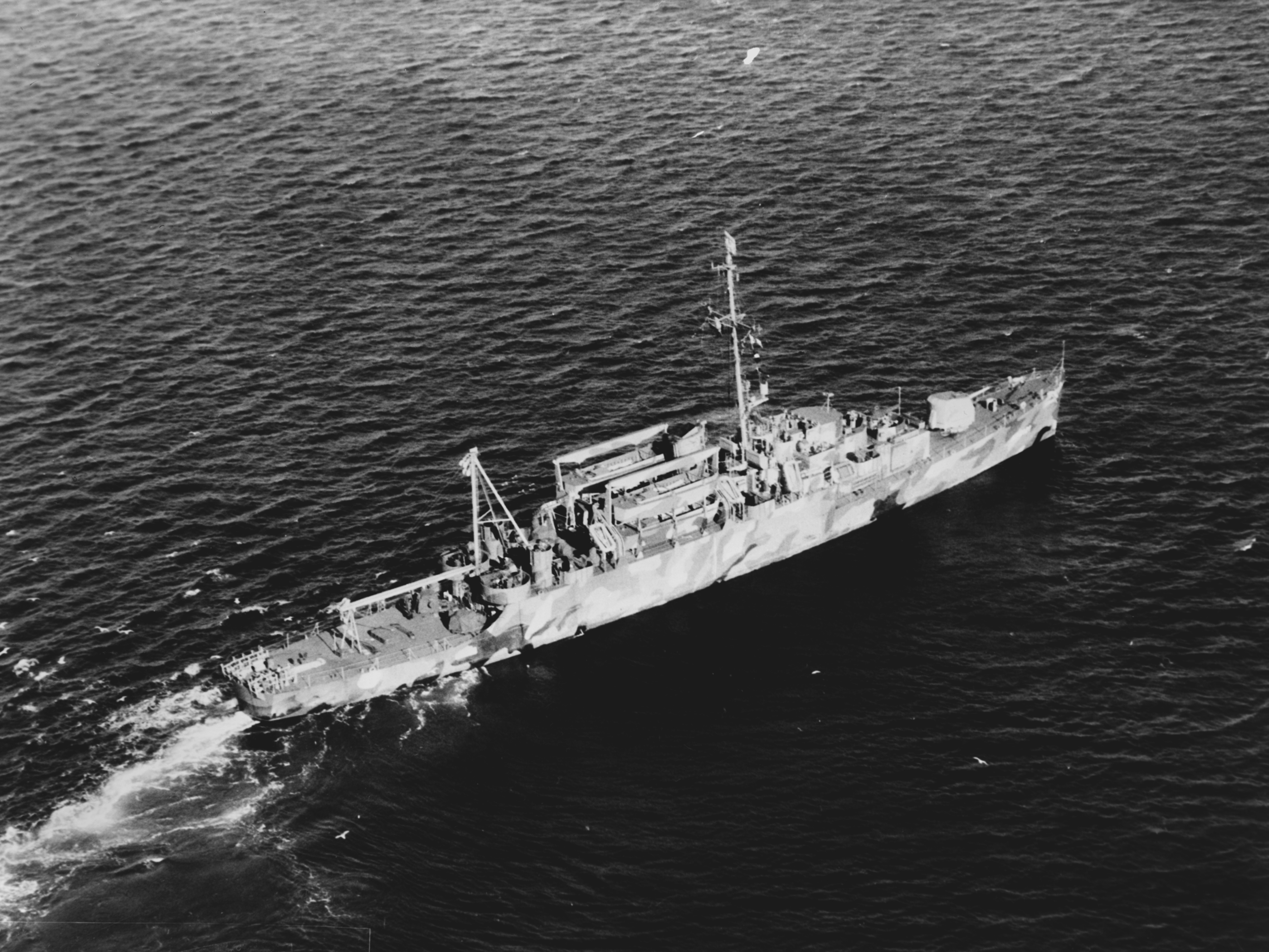
- Raymon W. Herndon underway circa 1944

History

United States
- Name: USS Raymon W. Herndon
- Namesake: Raymon W. Herndon
- Builder: Bethlehem Steel Company, Quincy, Massachusetts
- Laid down: 12 June 1944 as Rudderow-class destroyer escort Raymon W. Herndon
- Launched: 15 July 1944
- Sponsored by: Mrs. Raymon W. Herndon
- Identification: DE-688
- Commissioned: 3 November 1944
- Decommissioned: 15 November 1946
- Reclassified: APD-121, 17 July 1944
- Stricken: 1 September 1966
- Honors and awards: One battle star for World War II service
- Fate: Transferred to the Republic of China, October 1966

Taiwan
- Name: ROCS Heng Shan
- Acquired: October 1966
- Identification: DE-39
- Decommissioned: 1973
- Reclassified: PF-39
- Stricken: 1976
- Fate: Scrapped

General characteristics
- Class & type: Crosley-class high speed transport
- Displacement: 2,130 long tons (2,164 t) full
- Length: 306 ft (93 m)
- Beam: 37 ft (11 m)
- Draft: 12 ft 7 in (3.84 m)
- Speed: 23 knots (43 km/h; 26 mph)
- Troops: 162
- Complement: 204
- Armament: 1 × 5 in (130 mm) gun; 6 × 40 mm guns; 6 × 20 mm guns; 2 × depth charge tracks

USS Raymon W. Herndon (APD-121), ex-DE-688, was a United States Navy high-speed transport in commission from 1944 to 1946.

== Namesake ==
Raymon W. Herndon was born on 1 November 1918 at Walterboro, South Carolina. He reported for active duty with the United States Marine Corps on 29 April 1942 at New River, North Carolina.

On 14 September 1942 Private First Class Herndon was serving with the 1st Marine Division during action against Japanese forces on Guadalcanal in the Solomon Islands. While engaged in a hazardous reconnaissance patrol on the southern slope of a hill, Herndon was mortally wounded. With Japanese forces advancing rapidly on his position and realizing that he had no chance to survive, he asked that he be left with a weapon to cover the withdrawal of his patrol to the top of the hill. He was posthumously awarded the Navy Cross.

== Construction and commissioning ==
Raymon W. Herndon was laid down as the Rudderow-class destroyer escort USS Raymon W. Herndon (DE-688) on 12 June 1944 by the Bethlehem Steel Company at Quincy, Massachusetts, and was launched on 15 July 1944, sponsored by Mrs. Raymon W. Herndon, the widow of the ship's namesake. Raymon W. Herndon was reclassified as a Crosley-class high speed transport and redesignated APD-121 on 17 July 1944. After conversion for her new role, she was commissioned on 3 November 1944.

== Service history ==
=== World War II ===
Raymon W. Herndon departed Boston, Massachusetts, on 23 November 1944 for three weeks of shakedown off Bermuda. After arriving at Norfolk, Virginia, on 13 December 1944, she stood out of Hampton Roads, Virginia, on 1 January 1945, transited the Panama Canal, and reported to the United States Pacific Fleet for World War II duty on 7 January 1945.

Arriving at San Diego, California, on 16 January 1945, she departed on 25 January 1945, touched at Pearl Harbor, Territory of Hawaii, on 31 January 1945, and acquired her first combat experience at Okinawa.

Commencing 26 March 1945, Raymon W. Herndon supported her embarked Underwater Demolition Team 16 and provided antiaircraft gunnery support in the transport area off the invasion beaches. During the assault phase of the Okinawa operation, she assisted in maintaining an outer antisubmarine screen that extended completely around the Hagushi Beach transport area and the seaplane and logistics anchorage at Kerama Retto. Together with the other ships of the screen, she also provided protection from Japanese aircraft for the naval forces off the beachhead. Later she patrolled remote radar picket stations and bore the brunt of the relentless and determined attacks made by Japanese torpedo bombers, dive bombers, and kamikaze aircraft. She shot down one attacking aircraft and assisted in the destruction of two others on 6 April 1945.

Raymon W. Herndon supported the Okinawa campaign through 19 June 1945, only two days before Okinawa was finally declared secured.

=== Postwar ===
After the surrender of Japan on 15 August 1945, which brought World War II to a close, Raymon W. Herndon transported occupation forces to the coast of China and to ports in Japan. She was then directed to return to the United States.

After her return, Raymon W. Herndon moved to Green Cove Springs, Florida, for inactivation.

== Decommissioning and disposal ==
Raymon W. Herndon was decommissioned on 15 November 1946 at Green Cove Springs and joined the Atlantic Reserve Fleet there, later transferred the Atlantic Reserve Fleet, Norfolk. After nearly 20 years of Reserve Fleet inactivity, she was stricken from the Naval Vessel Register on 1 September 1966.

== Honors and awards ==
Raymon W. Herndon received one battle star for World War II service.

== Republic of China Navy service ==
In October 1966, Raymon W. Herndon was sold to the Republic of China under the Military Assistance Program. In the Republic of China Navy she served as ROCS Heng Shan until scrapped.
