= Julia Sand =

American correspondent of President Chester A. Arthur (1848–1933)

Julia Isabella Sand
- Born: April 1848; New York City, U.S.
- Died: May 1933 (aged 85); Amityville, New York, U.S.
- Years active: 1881-1883
- Known for: correspondence with Chester A. Arthur

Julia Isabella Sand (1848–1933) was an American woman who corresponded with President Chester A. Arthur, beginning in late August 1881. Arthur saved 23 letters, all of which were discovered in 1958 after his grandson, Chester Alan Arthur III (also known as Gavin Arthur), sold his grandfather's papers to the Library of Congress. The last surviving letter is dated September 15, 1883.

Sand often referred to herself as the President's "little dwarf", an allusion to the idea that in a royal court, only the dwarf would have the courage to tell the truth. It is not known whether Arthur responded to Sand's letters. Following her death in 1933, relatives burned Sand's papers without any thought as to their possible historic value.

== Background ==
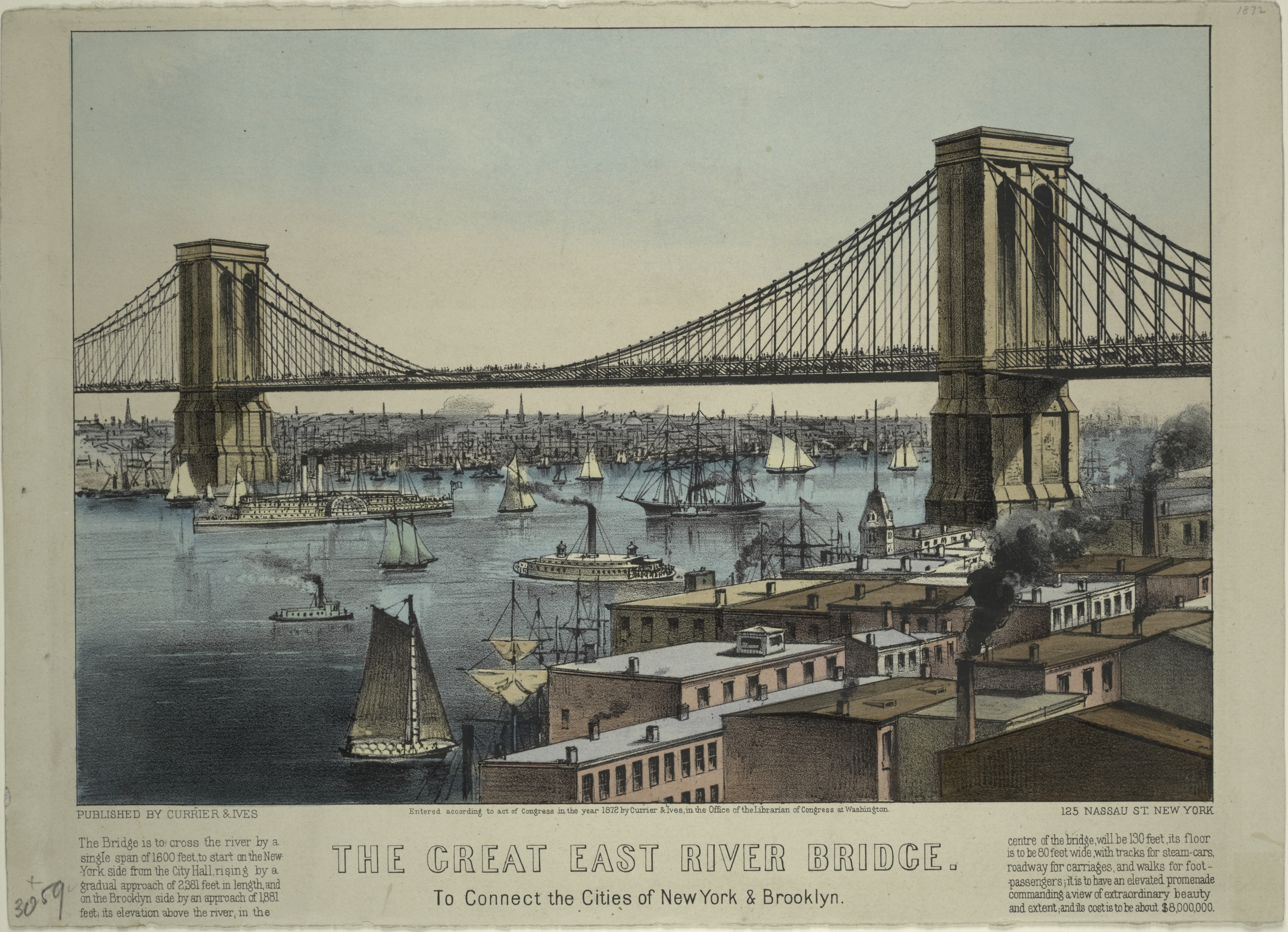
New York City during Sand's younger years

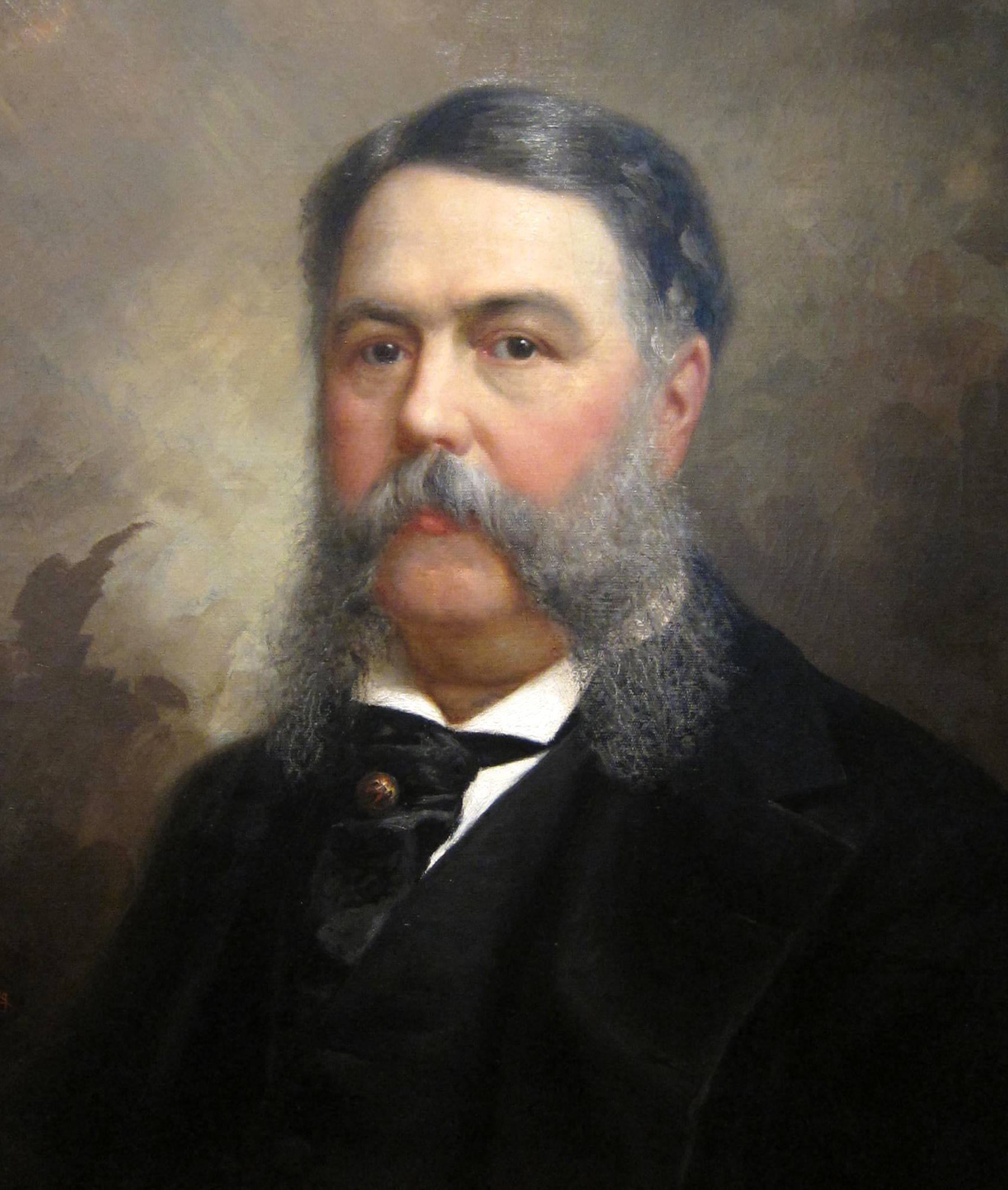
U.S. President Chester Arthur

Julia Sand was the eighth daughter of Christian Henry Sand. Her father emigrated to the United States from Germany in 1824 and went on to become President of the Metropolitan Gas Light Company of New York. She lived in Brooklyn until her father died in 1867, at which point her family moved to New Jersey. By 1880, they had settled at 46 East 74th Street in New York City. One of her brothers died in the American Civil War, which may have inspired her interest in politics.

Sand was educated, read French, enjoyed poetry, and travelled to fashionable Saratoga Springs and Newport. At the time she began writing to Arthur, she was bedridden due to spinal trouble, lameness, and deafness.

Most of what is known about Sand comes from her surviving letters to President Arthur.

She may have also been an artist, since she once asked Arthur for permission to paint him in watercolors.

== First letter ==
The hours of Garfield's life are numbered – before this meets your eye, you may be President. The people are bowed in grief; but – do you realize it? – not so much because he is dying, as because you are his successor. What president ever entered office under circumstances so sad?...

The day [Garfield] was shot, the thought rose in a thousand minds that you might be the instigator of the foul act. Is not that a humiliation which cuts deeper than any bullet can pierce?

Your kindest opponents say 'Arthur will try to do right' – adding gloomily – 'He won't succeed though making a man President cannot change him.'...But making a man President can change him! Great emergencies awaken generous traits which have lain dormant half a life. If there is a spark of true nobility in you, now is the occasion to let it shine. Faith in your better nature forces me to write to you – but not to beg you to resign. Do what is more difficult & brave. Reform! It is not proof of highest goodness never to have done wrong, but it is proof of it, sometimes in ones career, to pause & ponder, to recognize the evil, to turn resolutely against it.... Once in awhile [sic?] there comes a crisis which renders miracles feasible. The great tidal wave of sorrow which has rolled over the country has swept you loose from your old moorings & set you on a mountaintop, alone.

Disappoint our fears. Force the nation to have faith in you. Show from the first that you have none but the purest of aims.

You cannot slink back into obscurity, if you would. A hundred years hence, school boys will recite your name in the list of presidents & tell of your administration. And what shall posterity say? It is for you to choose....

— Julia Sand

Julia Sand wrote her first letter when she was thirty-one. Dated August 27, 1881, it reached Arthur when he was still U.S. vice president. Arthur's predecessor, President James A. Garfield, had been shot by Charles Guiteau; it took nearly two months for Garfield to die, during which time Vice President Arthur was in seclusion. Upon being caught, Guiteau had announced his hope that Arthur would be president and there was a brief investigation into whether Guiteau had been hired by Garfield's enemies. Though this was disproven, there were threats to Arthur's life and he feared making public appearances. Arthur's past was tied to various scandals involving the New York Custom House and it was feared by many that an Arthur presidency would be a disaster. The Republican Party was divided between "Stalwarts" (supporters of former U.S. President Ulysses Grant and New York party boss Roscoe Conkling) and "Half-Breeds" (supporters of U.S. President Garfield and U.S. Secretary of State James G. Blaine).

Sand's letter added that, for five years, she had felt "dead and buried" but the attempt on Garfield's life and U.S. lack of faith in Arthur had inspired her to attempt to inspire him.

== Other letters ==
Sand's letters generally contained political advice, although it was interspersed with personal details and concern regarding Arthur's health and personal life. As she had no political ties, all of her information apparently came from newspapers.

Historian and Chester Arthur biographer Thomas C. Reeves suggested her letters revealed a sympathy for the reformist wing of the Republican Party. In a letter of January 7, 1882, she remarked that it was rumored that Arthur's visits to New York were because he was engaged. "Do you remember any other President as restless as yourself, who was rushing home every few weeks? If, as Washington gossip hints, you are engaged and wish to see the lady without having her name dragged before the public – of course the end justifies the means." In the same letter, she remarked on an incident when Arthur had kissed a baby with such discomfort that she "had thought of Pickwick and almost died laughingly".

President Garfield died on September 19, 1881, and Arthur thus became U.S. president. After giving his inaugural address, he received another letter dated September 25, 1881. She encouraged him to let the country mourn and that he should show compassion to help the nation heal. Sand wrote to Arthur: "You are a better & nobler man, [due to] the manner in which you have borne yourself through this long, hard ordeal." (Letter of September 25, 1881).

Sand began to urge Arthur to visit her in a letter dated November 8, 1881 and subsequent letters indicated annoyance that he had not acknowledged the invitation.

Arthur came into conflict with Garfield's Cabinet, leading to widespread Cabinet defections and resignations. Sand encouraged him to keep Secretary of State James G. Blaine (who she called "that old fox") but was wary of him giving any position to former President Grant, saying: "Do not let people believe that he is to influence your administration. He will never give you an idea that is new, or deep, or even bright." She also commented on the resignation of Attorney General Wayne MacVeagh: "If Mr. McV thinks he is doing a grand thing in resigning, he is mistaken – he is doing a small one.... Just now it looks as if you were trying pretty hard to do your duty, & he was not trying at all." (Letter of October 27, 1881)

Sand urged Arthur to stay out of the Congressional elections of 1882, advice that he ignored.

== Visit with Arthur ==
As early as November 1881, Sand had begun intimating that she wished for the President to visit her.

On August 20, 1882, President Arthur paid a visit to Julia Sand at her home. He arrived "in a wonderful short rig...with two men on the box in claret livery". It was after dinner, at a point when Sand was prostrate on a sofa having "disdained roast beef and scorned peach pie". She heard Arthur's voice, which she mistook for that of a "gentle-voiced Episcopalian minister" (Letter of August 24, 1882).

Sand described the visit in a long letter dated August 24, 1882. Arthur stayed for an hour, but Sand was flustered by his arrival and hid behind a curtain throughout the visit. Then, Sand asked Arthur if he was fond of music.

This and other letters indicate that they discussed politics. Sand also apparently decided Arthur looked ill as she also remarked "You ought not to keep your malaria a secret and endure it so patiently."

Sand clearly hoped Arthur would return. Following a Presidential visit to Newport, she wrote another letter to Arthur on September 26, 1882.

== Political insights ==
Sand remained an ardent supporter of President Arthur throughout his presidency and once remarked "As yet I have not met anybody who believes in you, as I do." On August 1, 1882, Arthur vetoed the Rivers and Harbors Act over concerns that it had been filled with projects designed to raid the treasury and curry favor with various special interest groups. Sand wrote that the veto had "sent a thrill of enthusiasm" through her, echoing the general feeling of the American people. Sand also encouraged Arthur to veto the Chinese Exclusion Act, which he did in April 1882.

However, Arthur passed a compromise measure in May, prompting Sand to ask why he "took comfort in half measures?"

During the trials regarding the Star Route scandal – in which postal officials were receiving bribes in exchange for prime postal delivery routes – Sand advised not to "do anything weak in the Star Route cases.... If you must suffer, by all means suffer for the sake of truth & justice. What we suffer for wrong, degrades us – what we suffer for right, gives us strength." (Letter of September 15, 1882)

== Death ==
Sand's mother died in 1884 and Julia went to live with her sisters in Brooklyn. She apparently wrote for several magazines but remained a recluse. She never married and died in 1933, outlasting Arthur (who died in 1886) by almost half a century. She was buried in her family's plot at Green-Wood Cemetery in Brooklyn. In 2018 the New York Times published a belated obituary for her as part of its "Overlooked" series.

== Films ==
- Dear Mr. President: The Letters of Julia Sand (dir. Destry Edwards, 2025)

== See also ==
- Grace Bedell

== Sources ==
- Dehler, Gregory J. (2006). Chester Alan Arthur: The Life of a Gilded Age Politician and President. New York: Nova Science Publishers.
- Krowl, Michelle (May 18, 2020). "Julia Sand: The Letters to President Arthur, Now Digital". loc.gov. Library of Congress.
- Library of Congress (April 2020). "Chester A. Arthur's "Little Dwarf": The Correspondence of Julia I. Sand". loc.gov. Library of Congress.
- Millard, Candice (2011). Destiny of the Republic: A Tale of Madness, Medicine and the Murder of a President. New York: Doubleday.
- Reeves, Thomas C. (1975). Gentleman Boss: The Life of Chester A. Arthur. New York: Knopf.
- Reeves, Thomas C. (January 1971). "The President's Dwarf: The Letters of Julia Sand to Chester A. Arthur" in New York History. Vol LII. New York: New York State Historical Association.
- Shelley, Fred (May 1959). "The Chester A. Arthur Papers". Quarterly Journal of Current Acquisitions. 16 (3). Library of Congress: 115–122.
