= Chester A. Arthur =

President of the United States from 1881 to 1885

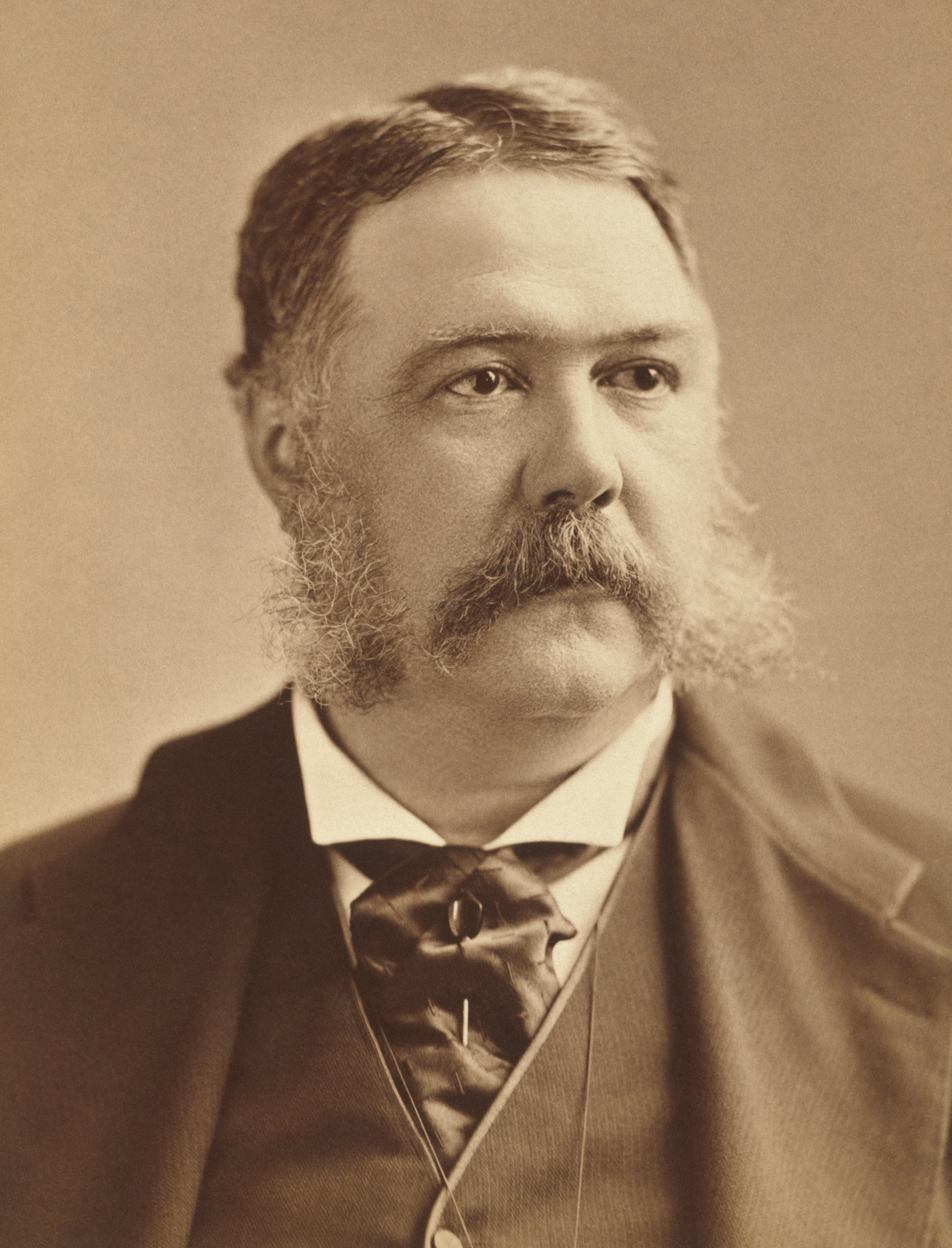
- Arthur in 1880

21st President of the United States
- In office September 19, 1881 – March 4, 1885
- Vice President: Vacant (Note: Arthur was Vice President under James A. Garfield and became President upon Garfield's death on September 19, 1881. This was prior to the adoption of the Twenty-fifth Amendment in 1967, and a vacancy in the office of vice president was not filled until the next ensuing election and inauguration.)
- Preceded by: James A. Garfield
- Succeeded by: Grover Cleveland

20th Vice President of the United States
- In office March 4 – September 19, 1881
- President: James A. Garfield
- Preceded by: William A. Wheeler
- Succeeded by: Thomas A. Hendricks

Chair of the New York Republican Party
- In office September 11, 1879 – October 11, 1881
- Preceded by: John F. Smyth
- Succeeded by: B. Platt Carpenter

21st Collector of the Port of New York
- In office December 1, 1871 – July 11, 1878
- Appointed by: Ulysses S. Grant
- Preceded by: Thomas Murphy
- Succeeded by: Edwin Atkins Merritt
Militia roles
Quartermaster General of the New York Militia
In office July 27, 1862 – January 1, 1863
Preceded by	Cuyler Van Vechten
Succeeded by	Sebastian Visscher Talcott
Inspector General of the New York Militia
In office April 14, 1862 – July 12, 1862
Preceded by	Marsena R. Patrick
Succeeded by	Cuyler Van Vechten
Engineer-in-Chief of the New York Militia
In office January 1, 1861 – January 1, 1863
Preceded by	George F. Nesbitt
Succeeded by	Isaac Vanderpoel

Personal details
- Born: Chester Alan Arthur; October 5, 1829 Fairfield, Vermont, U.S.
- Died: November 18, 1886 (aged 57) New York City, U.S.
- Resting place: Albany Rural Cemetery, Menands, New York
- Party: Republican (1854–1886)
- Other political affiliations: Whig (before 1854)
- Spouse: Ellen Herndon (m. 1859; died 1880)
- Children: William; Chester II; Ellen
- Parents: William Arthur; Malvina Stone
- Relatives: Gavin Arthur (grandson)
- Education: Union College (BA); State and National Law School
- Profession: Lawyer; civil servant

Military service
- Branch/service: New York Militia
- Years of service: 1857–1863
- Rank: Brigadier general
- Unit: Second Brigade, New York Militia; Staff of Governor Edwin D. Morgan
- Battles/wars: American Civil War; Peninsula campaign

Chester Alan Arthur (October 5, 1829 (Note: Some older sources list the date as October 5, 1830, but biographer Thomas C. Reeves confirms that this is incorrect: Arthur claimed to be a year younger "out of simple vanity".) – November 18, 1886) was the 21st president of the United States, serving from 1881 to 1885. A Republican from New York, he served as the 20th vice president under President James A. Garfield in 1881, assuming the presidency after Garfield's assassination. Arthur's administration saw the largest expansion of the U.S. Navy, the end of the so-called "spoils system", and the implementation of harsher restrictions for migrants entering from abroad.

Arthur was born in Fairfield, Vermont, and practiced law in New York City. He served as quartermaster general of the New York Militia during the American Civil War. Following the war, he devoted more time to New York Republican politics and quickly rose in Senator Roscoe Conkling's political organization. President Ulysses S. Grant appointed him as Collector of the Port of New York in 1871, and he was an important supporter of Conkling and the Stalwart faction of the Republican Party. In 1878, following bitter disputes between Conkling and President Rutherford B. Hayes over control of patronage in New York, Hayes fired Arthur as part of a plan to reform the federal patronage system.

During the 1880 Republican National Convention, the extended contest between Grant, identified with the Stalwarts, and James G. Blaine, the candidate of the Half-Breed faction, led to the compromise selection of James Garfield as the nominee for president. Republicans then nominated Arthur for vice president to balance the ticket geographically and to placate Stalwarts disappointed by Grant's defeat. Garfield and Arthur won the 1880 presidential election and took office in March 1881. Four months into his term, Garfield was shot by an assassin; he died 11 weeks later, and Arthur assumed the presidency.

As president, Arthur presided over the rebirth of the U.S. Navy, but he was criticized for failing to alleviate the federal budget surplus which had been accumulating since the end of the Civil War. Arthur vetoed the first version of the 1882 Chinese Exclusion Act, arguing that its twenty-year ban on Chinese immigrants to the United States violated the Burlingame Treaty, but he signed a second version, which included a ten-year ban. He appointed Horace Gray and Samuel Blatchford to the Supreme Court. He also enforced the Immigration Act of 1882 to impose more restrictions on immigrants and the Tariff of 1883 to attempt to reduce tariffs. Arthur signed into law the Pendleton Civil Service Reform Act of 1883, which came as a surprise to reformers who held a negative opinion of Arthur as a Stalwart and product of Conkling's organization.

Suffering from poor health, Arthur made only a limited effort to secure the Republican Party's nomination in 1884, and he retired at the end of his term. Arthur's failing health and political temperament combined to make his administration less active than a modern presidency, yet he earned praise among contemporaries for his solid performance in office.

== Early life ==
=== Birth and family ===
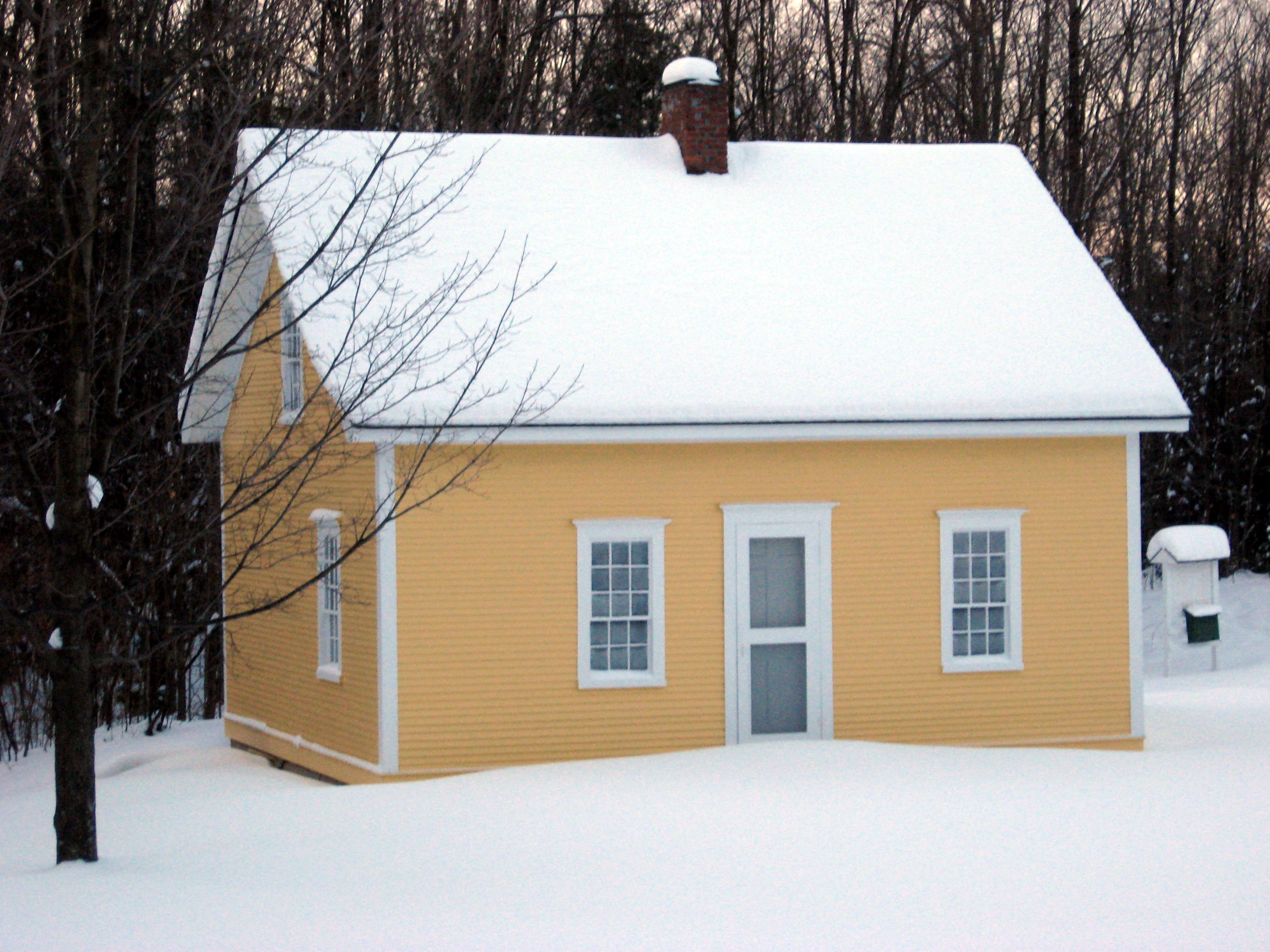
Arthur's birthplace in Fairfield, Vermont

Chester Alan Arthur was born in Fairfield, Vermont. Arthur's mother, Malvina Stone, was born in Berkshire, Vermont, the daughter of George Washington Stone and Judith Stevens. Her family was primarily of English and Welsh descent, and her paternal grandfather, Uriah Stone, had served in the Continental Army during the American Revolution.

Arthur's father, William Arthur, was born in 1796 in Dreen, Cullybackey, County Antrim, Ireland, to a Presbyterian family. William's mother was born Eliza McHarg and she married Alan Arthur. William graduated from college in Belfast and migrated to the Province of Lower Canada in 1819 or 1820. Malvina Stone met William Arthur when Arthur was teaching in Dunham, Quebec, near the Vermont border. They married in Dunham on April 12, 1821.

The Arthurs moved to Vermont after the birth of their first child, Regina. They quickly moved from Burlington to Jericho, and finally to Waterville, as William received positions teaching at different schools. William Arthur also spent a brief time studying law, but while still in Waterville, he departed from both his legal studies and his Presbyterian upbringing to join the Free Will Baptists; he spent the rest of his life as a minister in that denomination. William Arthur became an outspoken abolitionist, which often made him unpopular with some members of his congregations and contributed to the family's frequent moves.

In 1828, the family moved again, to Fairfield, where Chester Alan Arthur was born the following year; he was the fifth of nine children. He was named "Chester" after Chester Abell, the physician and family friend who assisted in his birth, and "Alan" for his paternal grandfather. (Note: Arthur pronounced his middle name with the accent on the second syllable.) The family remained in Fairfield until 1832, when William Arthur's profession took them to churches in several towns in Vermont and upstate New York. The family finally settled in Schenectady, New York, in 1844.

Arthur had a brother, George (1836–1838), who died as a toddler, and seven siblings who lived to adulthood: Regina (1822–1910), the wife of William G. Caw, a grocer, banker, and community leader of Cohoes, New York, who served as town supervisor and village trustee; Jane (1824–1842); Almeda (1825–1899), the wife of James H. Masten who served as postmaster of Cohoes and publisher of the Cohoes Cataract newspaper; Ann (1828–1915), a career educator who taught school in New York and worked in South Carolina in the years immediately before and after the Civil War; Malvina (1832–1920), the wife of Henry J. Haynesworth who was an official of the Confederate government and a merchant in Albany, New York, before being appointed as a captain and assistant quartermaster in the U.S. Army during Arthur's presidency; William (1834–1915), a medical school graduate and career Army officer and paymaster who was wounded during his Civil War service. William Arthur retired in 1898 with the brevet rank of lieutenant colonel, and permanent rank of major; and Mary (1841–1917), the wife of John E. McElroy, an Albany businessman and insurance executive, and Arthur's official White House hostess during his presidency.

The family's frequent moves later spawned accusations that Arthur was not a native-born citizen of the United States. When Arthur was nominated for vice president in 1880, a New York attorney and political opponent, Arthur P. Hinman, initially speculated that Arthur was born in Ireland and did not come to the United States until he was 14 years old. Had that been true, opponents might have argued that Arthur was ineligible for the vice presidency under the United States Constitution's natural-born-citizen clause. (Note: The Twelfth Amendment to the United States Constitution applies presidential ineligibility to would-be vice presidents: "No person constitutionally ineligible to the office of President shall be eligible to that of Vice-President.") When Hinman's original story did not take root, he spread a new rumor that Arthur was born in Canada. (Note: Even if he had been born in Canada, Arthur might have still claimed to be a "natural born citizen" based on his mother having been born in and recently resided in the United States.) This claim, too, failed to gain credence. (Note: Among the facts that argue against Hinman's theories are the entries for Chester A. Arthur in several U.S. Censuses from before he was politically prominent, which list his birthplace as Vermont, and the entry of his birth in the Arthur family Bible, which also indicates Vermont as his birthplace. In addition, contemporary newspaper articles, including the 1871 stories about his appointment as Collector of the Port of New York, all indicate that he was born in Vermont, though some incorrectly give his birthplace as Burlington. Hinman failed to explain why Arthur would have fabricated these records and the biographical information he provided to newspapers to conceal a Canadian birth when the only thing being born in Canada might possibly affect was Arthur's eligibility for the presidency, which no one at the time of his birth or in the years between his birth and his nomination for vice president in 1880 had any reason to think he would aspire to.)

=== Education ===
Arthur spent some of his childhood years living in the New York towns of York, Perry, Greenwich, Lansingburgh, Schenectady, and Hoosick. One of his first teachers said Arthur was a boy "frank and open in manners and genial in disposition". During his time at school, he gained his first political inclinations and supported the Whig Party. He joined other young Whigs in support of Henry Clay, even participating in a brawl against students who supported James K. Polk during the 1844 United States presidential election. Arthur also supported the Fenian Brotherhood, an Irish republican organization founded in America; he showed this support by wearing a green coat. After completing his college preparation at the Lyceum of Union Village (now Greenwich) and a grammar school in Schenectady, Arthur enrolled at Union College there in 1845, where he studied the traditional classical curriculum. He was a member of the Psi Upsilon fraternity, and as a senior he was president of the debate society and was elected to Phi Beta Kappa. During his winter breaks, he served as a teacher at a school in Schaghticoke.

After graduating in 1848, Arthur returned to Schaghticoke and became a full-time teacher, and soon began to pursue an education in law. While studying law, he continued teaching, moving closer to home by taking a job at a school in North Pownal, Vermont. Coincidentally, future president James A. Garfield taught penmanship at the same school three years later, but the two did not cross paths during their teaching careers. In 1852, Arthur moved again, to Cohoes, New York, to become the principal of a school at which his sister, Malvina, was a teacher. In 1853, after studying at State and National Law School in Ballston Spa, New York, and then saving enough money to relocate, Arthur moved to New York City to read law at the office of Erastus D. Culver, an abolitionist lawyer and family friend. When Arthur was admitted to the New York bar in 1854, he joined Culver's firm, which was subsequently renamed Culver, Parker, and Arthur.

== Early career ==
=== New York lawyer ===
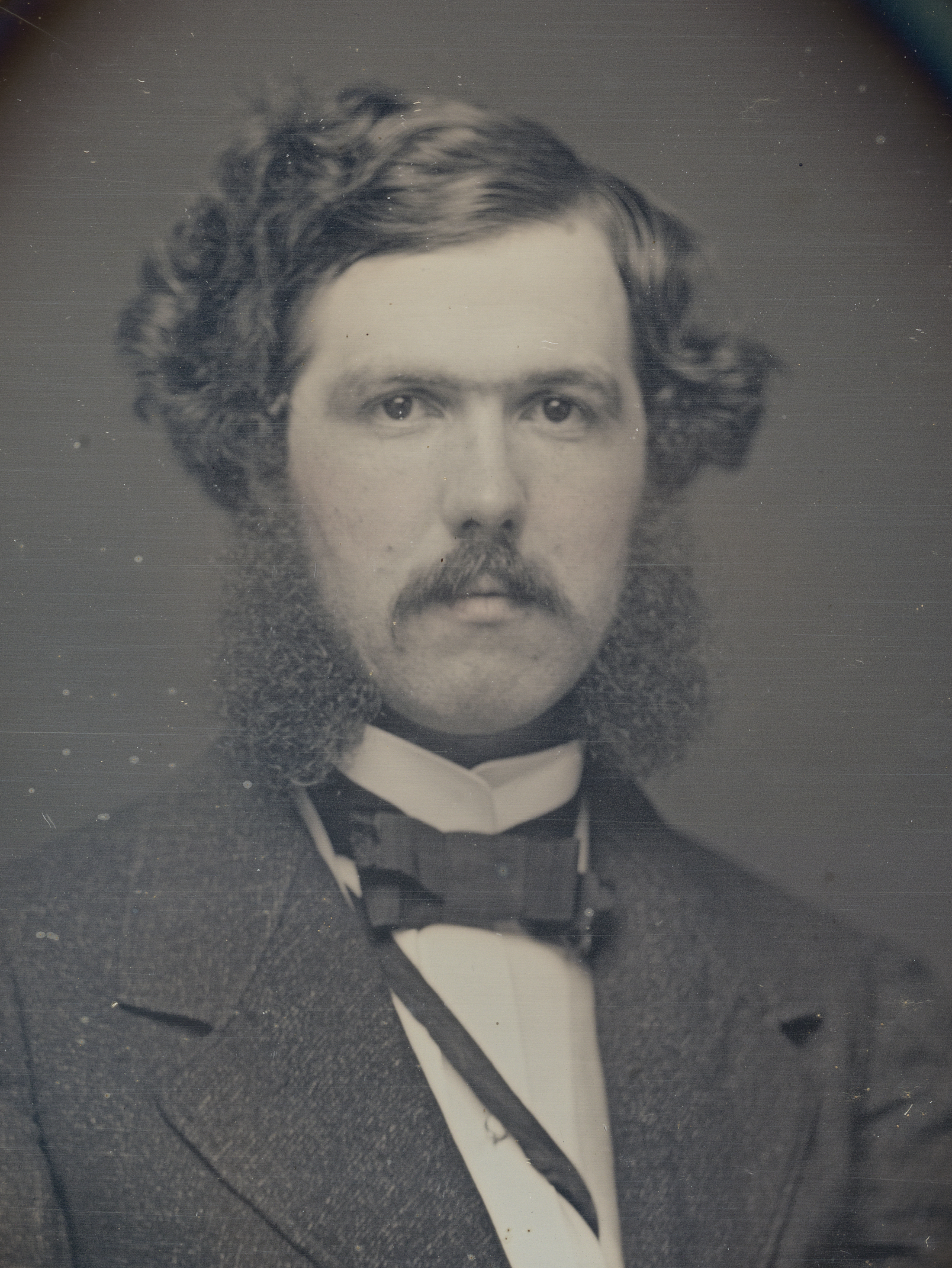
Arthur as a lawyer in 1858

When Arthur joined the firm, Culver and New York attorney John Jay (the grandson of the Founding Father John Jay) were pursuing a habeas corpus action against Jonathan Lemmon, a Virginian slaveholder who was passing through New York with his eight slaves. In Lemmon v. New York, Culver argued that, as New York law did not permit slavery, any slave arriving in New York was automatically freed. The argument was successful, and after several appeals was upheld by the New York Court of Appeals in 1860. Campaign biographers would later give Arthur much of the credit for the victory; in fact his role was minor, although he was certainly an active participant in the case. In another civil rights case in 1854, Arthur was the lead attorney representing Elizabeth Jennings Graham after the conductor physically removed her from a streetcar because she was black. He won the case, and the verdict led to the desegregation of the New York City streetcar lines.

In 1856, Arthur courted Ellen Herndon, the daughter of William Lewis Herndon, a Virginian naval officer. The two were soon engaged to be married. Later that year, he started a new law partnership with a friend, Henry D. Gardiner, and traveled with him to Kansas to consider purchasing land and setting up a law practice there. At that time, the state was the scene of violent confrontations between pro-slavery and anti-slavery settlers, and Arthur lined up firmly with the latter. The rough frontier life did not agree with the genteel New Yorkers; after three or four months the two young lawyers returned to New York City, where Arthur comforted his fiancée after her father was lost at sea in the wreck of the SS Central America. In 1859, they were married at Calvary Episcopal Church in Manhattan. The couple had three children:

- William Lewis Arthur (December 10, 1860 – July 7, 1863), died of "convulsions"
- Chester Alan Arthur II (July 25, 1864 – July 18, 1937), married Myra Townsend, then Rowena Graves, father of Gavin Arthur
- Ellen Hansbrough Herndon "Nell" Arthur Pinkerton (November 21, 1871 – September 6, 1915), married Charles Pinkerton

After his marriage, Arthur devoted his efforts to building his law practice, but also found time to engage in Republican party politics. In addition, he indulged his military interest by becoming Judge Advocate General for the Second Brigade of the New York Militia.

=== Civil War ===
In 1861, Arthur was appointed to the military staff of Governor Edwin D. Morgan as engineer-in-chief. The office was a patronage appointment of minor importance until the outbreak of the Civil War in April 1861, when New York and the other northern states were faced with raising and equipping armies of a size never before seen in American history. Arthur was commissioned as a brigadier general and assigned to the state militia's quartermaster department. He was so efficient at housing and outfitting the troops that poured into New York City that he was promoted to inspector general of the state militia in March 1862, and then to quartermaster general that July. He had an opportunity to serve at the front when the 9th New York Volunteer Infantry Regiment elected him commander with the rank of colonel early in the war, but at Governor Morgan's request, he turned it down to remain at his post in New York. He also turned down command of four New York City regiments organized as the Metropolitan Brigade, again at Morgan's request. The closest Arthur came to the front was when he traveled south to inspect New York troops near Fredericksburg, Virginia, in May 1862, shortly after forces under Major General Irvin McDowell seized the town during the Peninsula campaign. That summer, he and other representatives of northern governors met with Secretary of State William H. Seward in New York to coordinate the raising of additional troops, and he spent the next few months helping to enlist New York's quota of 120,000 men. Arthur received plaudits for his work, but his post was a political appointment, and he was relieved of his militia duties in January 1863 when Governor Horatio Seymour, a Democrat, took office. When Reuben Fenton won the 1864 election for governor, Arthur requested reappointment; Fenton and Arthur were from different factions of the Republican Party, and Fenton had already committed to appointing another candidate, so Arthur did not return to military service.

Arthur returned to practicing law, and with the help of additional contacts made in the military, he and the firm of Arthur & Gardiner flourished. Even as his professional life improved, however, Arthur and his wife experienced a personal tragedy as their only child, William, died suddenly that year at the age of two. The couple took their son's death hard, and when they had another son, Chester Alan Jr., in 1864, they lavished attention on him. They also had a daughter, Ellen, in 1871. Both children survived to adulthood.

Arthur's political prospects improved along with his law practice when his patron, ex-Governor Morgan, was elected to the United States Senate. He was hired by Thomas Murphy, a Republican politician, but also a friend of William M. Tweed, the boss of the Tammany Hall Democratic organization. Murphy was also a hatter who sold goods to the Union Army, and Arthur represented him in Washington. The two became associates within New York Republican party circles, eventually rising in the ranks of the conservative branch of the party dominated by Thurlow Weed. In the presidential election of 1864, Arthur and Murphy raised funds from Republicans in New York, and they attended the second inauguration of Abraham Lincoln in 1865.

== New York politician ==
=== Conkling's machine ===
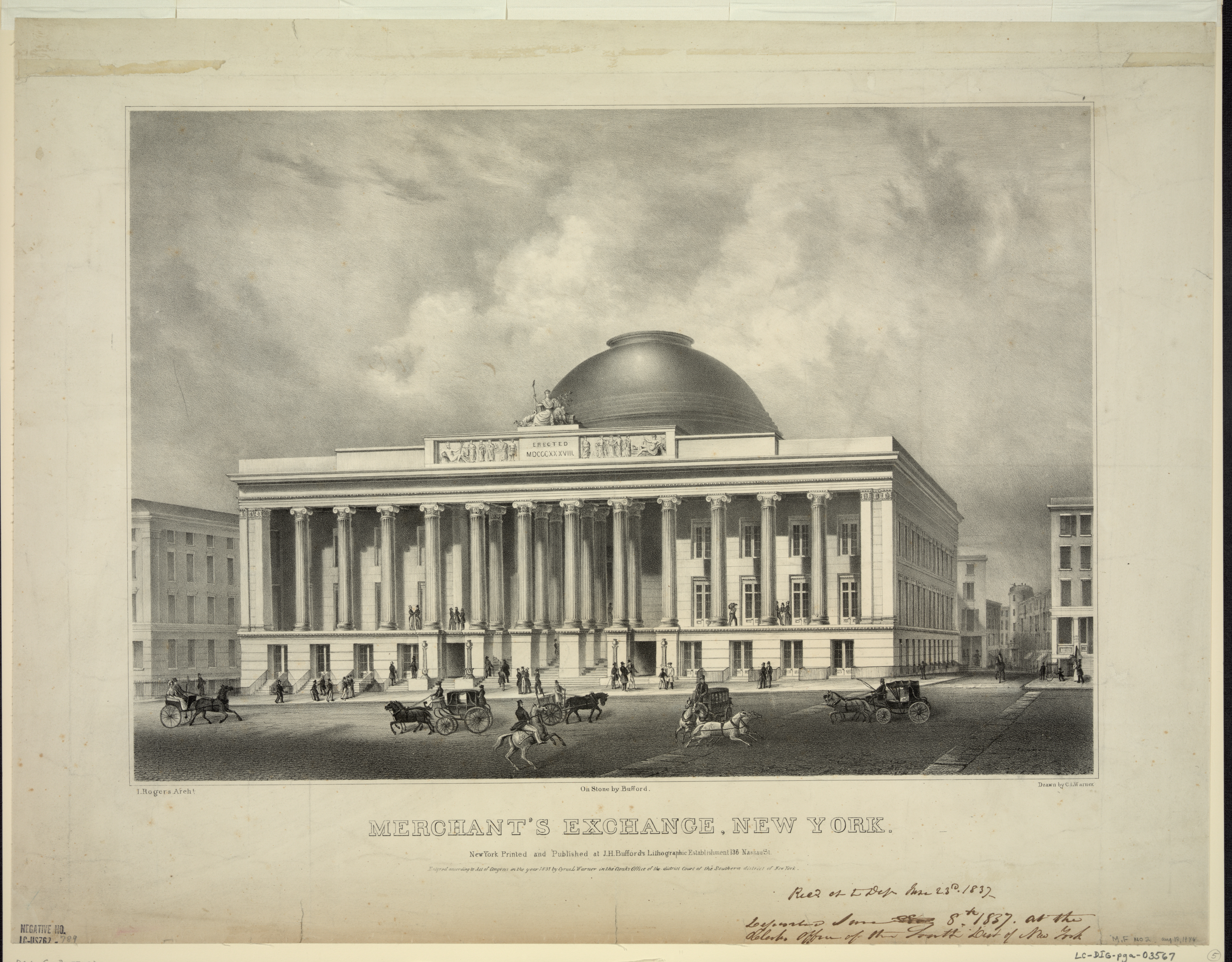
The New York Custom House (formerly the Merchants' Exchange building at 55 Wall Street) was Arthur's office for seven years.

The end of the Civil War meant new opportunities for the men in Morgan's Republican machine, including Arthur. Morgan leaned toward the conservative wing of the New York Republican party, as did the men who worked with him in the organization, including Weed, Seward (who continued in office under President Andrew Johnson), and Roscoe Conkling (an eloquent Utica Congressman and rising star in the party). Arthur rarely articulated his own political ideas during his time as a part of the machine; as was common at the time, loyalty and hard work on the machine's behalf was more important than actual political positions.

At the time, U.S. custom houses were managed by political appointees who served as Collector, Naval Officer, and Surveyor. In 1866, Arthur unsuccessfully attempted to secure the position of Naval Officer at the New York Custom House, a lucrative job subordinate only to the Collector. He continued his law practice (now a solo practice after Gardiner's death) and his role in politics, becoming a member of the prestigious Century Club in 1867. Conkling, elected to the United States Senate in 1867, noticed Arthur and facilitated his rise in the party, and Arthur became chairman of the New York City Republican executive committee in 1868. His ascent in the party hierarchy kept him busy most nights, and his wife resented his continual absence from the family home on party business.

Conkling succeeded to leadership of the conservative wing of New York's Republicans by 1868 as Morgan concentrated more time and effort on national politics, including serving as chairman of the Republican National Committee. The Conkling machine was solidly behind General Ulysses S. Grant's candidacy for president, and Arthur raised funds for Grant's election in 1868. The opposing Democratic machine in New York City, known as Tammany Hall, worked for Grant's opponent, former New York Governor Horatio Seymour; while Grant was victorious in the national vote, Seymour narrowly carried the state of New York. Arthur began to devote more of his time to politics and less to law, and in 1869 he became counsel to the New York City Tax Commission, appointed when Republicans controlled the state legislature. He remained at the job until 1870 at a salary of $10,000 a year. (Note: $10,000 in 1870 is equal to $254,605 in present terms.) Arthur resigned after Democrats controlled by William M. Tweed of Tammany Hall won a legislative majority, which meant they could name their own appointee. In 1871, Grant offered to name Arthur as Commissioner of Internal Revenue, replacing Alfred Pleasonton; Arthur declined the appointment.

In 1870, President Grant gave Conkling control over New York patronage, including the Custom House at the Port of New York. Having become friendly with Murphy over their shared love of horses during summer vacations on the Jersey Shore, in July of that year, Grant appointed him to the Collector's position. Murphy's reputation as a war profiteer and his association with Tammany Hall made him unacceptable to many of his own party, but Conkling convinced the Senate to confirm him. The Collector was responsible for hiring hundreds of workers to collect the tariffs due at the United States' busiest port. Typically, these jobs were dispensed to adherents of the political machine responsible for appointing the Collector. Employees were required to make political contributions (known as "assessments") back to the machine, which made the job a highly coveted political plum. Murphy's unpopularity only increased as he replaced workers loyal to Senator Reuben Fenton's faction of the Republican party with those loyal to Conkling's. Eventually, the pressure to replace Murphy grew too great, and Grant asked for his resignation in December 1871. Grant offered the position to John Augustus Griswold and William Orton, each of whom declined and recommended Arthur. Grant then nominated Arthur, with the New York Times commenting, "his name very seldom rises to the surface of metropolitan life and yet moving like a mighty undercurrent this man during the last 10 years has done more to mold the course of the Republican Party in this state than any other one man in the country."

The Senate confirmed Arthur's appointment; as Collector he controlled nearly a thousand jobs and received compensation as great as any federal officeholder. Arthur's salary was initially $6,500, but senior customs employees were compensated additionally by the "moiety" system, which awarded them a percentage of the cargoes seized and fines levied on importers who attempted to evade the tariff. In total, his income came to more than $50,000—more than the president's salary, and more than enough for him to enjoy fashionable clothes and a lavish lifestyle. (Note: $50,000 in 1871 is equal to $1.34 million in present terms.) Among those who dealt with the Custom House, Arthur was one of the era's more popular collectors. He got along with his subordinates and, since Murphy had already filled the staff with Conkling's adherents, he had few occasions to fire anyone. He was also popular within the Republican party as he efficiently collected campaign assessments from the staff and placed party leaders' friends in jobs as positions became available. Arthur had a better reputation than Murphy, but reformers still criticized the patronage structure and the moiety system as corrupt. A rising tide of reform within the party caused Arthur to rename the financial extractions from employees as "voluntary contributions" in 1872, but the concept remained, and the party reaped the benefit of controlling government jobs. In that year, reform-minded Republicans formed the Liberal Republican party and voted against Grant, but he was re-elected in spite of their opposition. Nevertheless, the movement for civil service reform continued to chip away at Conkling's patronage machine; in 1874 Custom House employees were found to have improperly assessed fines against an importing company as a way to increase their own incomes, and Congress reacted, repealing the moiety system and putting the staff, including Arthur, on regular salaries. As a result, his income dropped to $12,000 a year—more than his nominal boss, the Secretary of the Treasury, but far less than what he had previously received.

=== Clash with Hayes ===
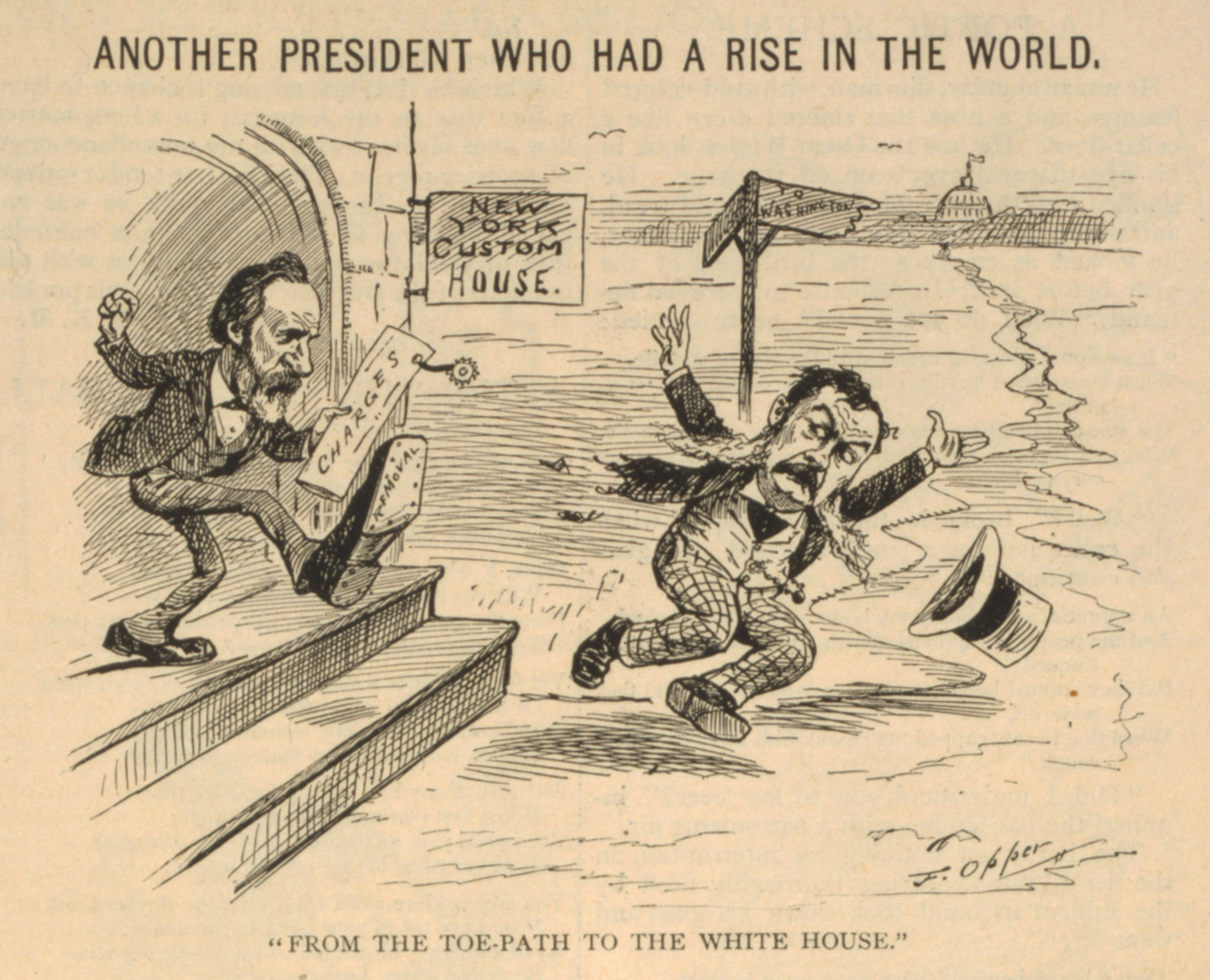
A cartoon depicting President Rutherford B. Hayes kicking Arthur out of the New York Custom House

Arthur's four-year term as Collector expired on December 10, 1875, and Conkling, then among the most powerful politicians in Washington, arranged his protégé's reappointment by President Grant. Conkling was a candidate for president at the 1876 Republican National Convention, but the nomination was won by reformer Rutherford B. Hayes on the seventh ballot. Arthur and the machine gathered campaign funds with their usual zeal, but Conkling limited his own campaign activities for Hayes to a few speeches. Hayes's opponent, New York Governor Samuel J. Tilden, carried New York and won the popular vote nationwide, but after the resolution of several months of disputes over twenty electoral votes (from Florida, Louisiana, Oregon, and South Carolina), Hayes was declared the winner.

Hayes entered office with a pledge to reform the patronage system; in 1877, he and Treasury Secretary John Sherman made Conkling's machine the primary target. Sherman ordered a commission led by John Jay to investigate the New York Custom House. Jay, with whom Arthur had collaborated in the Lemmon case two decades earlier, suggested that the Custom House was overstaffed with political appointments, and that 20% of the employees were expendable. Sherman was less enthusiastic about the reforms than Hayes and Jay, but he approved the commission's report and ordered Arthur to make the personnel reductions. Arthur appointed a committee of Custom House workers to determine where the cuts were to be made and, after a written protest, carried them out. Notwithstanding his cooperation, the Jay Commission issued a second report critical of Arthur and other Custom House employees, and subsequent reports urging a complete reorganization.

Hayes further struck at the heart of the spoils system by issuing an executive order that forbade assessments, and barred federal office holders from "...tak[ing] part in the management of political organizations, caucuses, conventions, or election campaigns." Arthur and his subordinates, Naval Officer Alonzo B. Cornell and Surveyor George H. Sharpe, refused to obey the president's order; Sherman encouraged Arthur to resign, offering him appointment by Hayes to the consulship in Paris in exchange, but Arthur refused. In September 1877, Hayes demanded the three men's resignations, which they refused to give. Hayes then submitted the appointment of Theodore Roosevelt Sr., L. Bradford Prince, and Edwin Merritt (all supporters of Conkling's rival William M. Evarts) to the Senate for confirmation as their replacements. The Senate's Commerce Committee, chaired by Conkling, unanimously rejected all the nominees; the full Senate rejected Roosevelt by a vote of 31–25 and similarly turned down the nomination of Prince by the same margin, later confirming Merritt only because Sharpe's term had expired.

Arthur's job was spared only until July 1878, when Hayes took advantage of a Congressional recess to fire him and Cornell, replacing them with the recess appointments of Merritt and Silas W. Burt. (Note: Charles K. Graham filled Merritt's former position.) Hayes again offered Arthur the position of consul general in Paris as a face-saving consolation; Arthur again declined, as Hayes knew he probably would. Conkling opposed the confirmation of Merritt and Burt when the Senate reconvened in February 1879, but Merritt was approved by a vote of 31–25, as was Burt by 31–19, giving Hayes his most significant civil service reform victory. Arthur immediately took advantage of the resulting free time to work for the election of Edward Cooper as New York City's next mayor. In September 1879 Arthur became chairman of the New York State Republican Executive Committee, a post in which he served until October 1881. In the state elections of 1879, he and Conkling worked to ensure that the Republican nominees for state offices would be men of Conkling's faction, who had become known as Stalwarts. They were successful, but narrowly, as Cornell was nominated for governor by a vote of 234–216. Arthur and Conkling campaigned vigorously for the Stalwart ticket and, owing partly to a splintering of the Democratic vote, were victorious. Arthur and the machine had rebuked Hayes and their intra-party rivals, but Arthur had only a few days to enjoy his triumph when, on January 12, 1880, his wife died suddenly while he was in Albany organizing the political agenda for the coming year. Arthur felt devastated, and perhaps guilty, and never remarried.

== 1880 vice presidential campaign ==
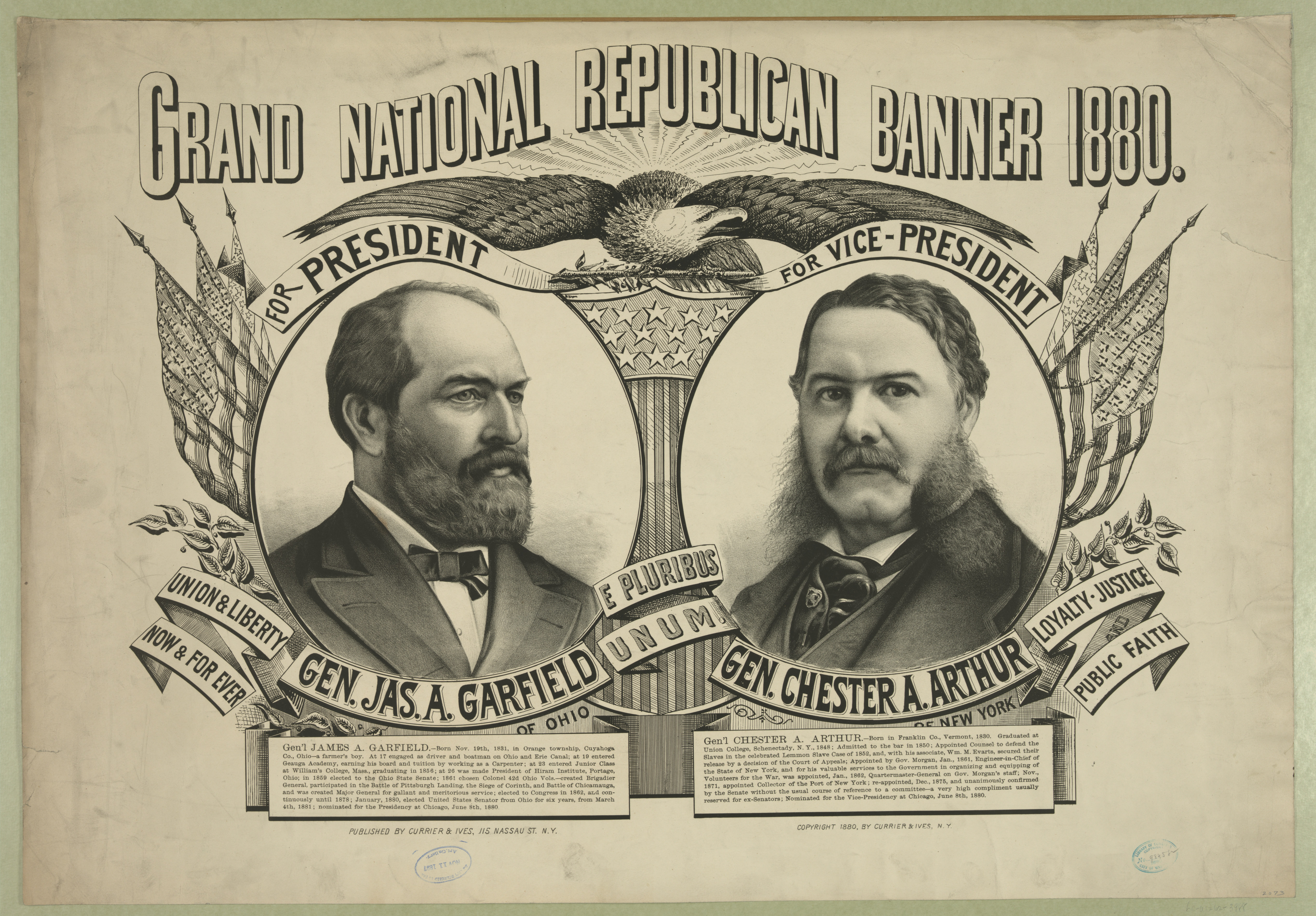
Garfield–Arthur campaign poster

Conkling and his fellow Stalwarts, including Arthur, wished to follow up their 1879 success at the 1880 Republican National Convention by securing the presidential nomination for their ally, ex-President Grant. Their opponents in the Republican party, known as Half-Breeds, concentrated their efforts on James G. Blaine, a senator from Maine who was more amenable to civil service reform. Neither candidate commanded a majority of delegates and, deadlocked after thirty-six ballots, the convention turned to a dark horse, James A. Garfield, an Ohio Congressman and Civil War general who was neither Stalwart nor Half-Breed.

Garfield and his supporters knew they would face a difficult election without the support of the New York Stalwarts and decided to offer one of them the vice presidential nomination. Levi P. Morton, the first choice of Garfield's supporters, consulted with Conkling, who advised him to decline, which he did. They next approached Arthur, and Conkling advised him to also reject the nomination, believing the Republicans would lose. Arthur thought otherwise and accepted. According to a purported eyewitness account by journalist William C. Hudson, Conkling and Arthur argued, with Arthur telling Conkling, "The office of the Vice-President is a greater honor than I ever dreamed of attaining." (Note: Biographer George Howe takes this exchange at face value, but later biographers suspect it may be apocryphal.) Conkling eventually relented, and campaigned for the ticket.

As expected, the election was close. The Democratic nominee, General Winfield Scott Hancock was popular, and, having avoided taking definitive positions on most issues of the day, he had not offended any pivotal constituencies. As Republicans had done since the end of the Civil War, Garfield and Arthur initially focused their campaign on the "bloody shirt"—the idea that returning Democrats to office would undo the victory of the Civil War and reward secessionists.

With the war fifteen years in the past and Union generals at the head of both tickets, the tactic was less effective than the Republicans hoped. Realizing this, they adjusted their approach to claim that Democrats would lower the country's protective tariff, which would allow cheaper manufactured goods to be imported from Europe, and thereby put thousands out of work. This argument struck home in the swing states of New York and Indiana, where many were employed in manufacturing. Hancock did not help his own cause when, in an attempt to remain neutral on the tariff, he said that "[t]he tariff question is a local question", which only made him appear uninformed about an important issue. Candidates for high office did not personally campaign in those days, but as state Republican chairman, Arthur played a part in the campaign in his usual fashion: overseeing the effort in New York and raising money. The funds were crucial in the close election, and winning his home state of New York was critical. The Republicans carried New York by 20,000 votes and, in an election with the largest turnout of qualified voters ever recorded—78.4%—they won the nationwide popular vote by just 7,018 votes. The Electoral College result was more decisive—214 to 155—and Garfield and Arthur were elected.

== Vice presidency (1881) ==
After the election, Arthur worked in vain to persuade Garfield to fill certain positions with his fellow New York Stalwarts—especially that of the Secretary of the Treasury; the Stalwart machine received a further rebuke when Garfield appointed Blaine, Conkling's arch-enemy, as Secretary of State. The running mates, never close, detached as Garfield continued to freeze out the Stalwarts from his patronage. Arthur's status in the administration diminished when, a month before inauguration day, he gave a speech before reporters suggesting the election in Indiana, a swing state, had been won by Republicans through illegal machinations. Garfield ultimately appointed a Stalwart, Thomas Lemuel James, to be Postmaster General, but the cabinet fight and Arthur's ill-considered speech left the President and Vice President clearly estranged when they took office on March 4, 1881.

The Senate of the 47th United States Congress was divided among 37 Republicans, 37 Democrats, one independent (David Davis) who caucused with the Democrats, one Readjuster (William Mahone), and four vacancies. After Mahone joined the Republican caucus, Arthur approved Republicans to lead every Senate committee in the soonest instance of a vice president casting a tie-breaking vote after being sworn in. When Conkling and New York's other senator, Thomas C. Platt, resigned in protest of Garfield's replacement of Merritt with William H. Robertson as Collector of the Port of New York, Democrats accepted Republican committee control in exchange for retaining the Senate Secretary and Sergeant at Arms of the prior session.

With the Senate in recess, Arthur had no duties in Washington and returned to New York City. Once there, he traveled with Conkling to Albany, where the former senator hoped for a quick re-election to the Senate, and with it, a defeat for the Garfield administration. (Note: Before the passage of the Seventeenth Amendment to the United States Constitution, Senators were elected by state legislatures.) The Republican majority in the state legislature was divided on the question, to Conkling and Platt's surprise, and an intense campaign in the statehouse ensued. (Note: Conkling and Pratt were ultimately denied re-election, being succeeded by Elbridge G. Lapham and Warner Miller, respectively.)

While in Albany on July 2, Arthur learned that Garfield had been shot. The assassin, Charles J. Guiteau, was a deranged office-seeker who believed that Garfield's successor would appoint him to a patronage job. He proclaimed to onlookers: "I am a Stalwart, and Arthur will be President!" Guiteau was found to be mentally unstable, and despite his claims to be a Stalwart supporter of Arthur, they had only a tenuous connection that dated from the 1880 campaign. Twenty-nine days before his execution for shooting Garfield, Guiteau composed a lengthy, unpublished poem claiming that Arthur knew the assassination had saved "our land [the United States]". Guiteau's poem also states he had (incorrectly) presumed that Arthur would pardon him for the assassination.

More troubling was the lack of legal guidance on presidential succession: as Garfield lingered near death, no one was sure who, if anyone, could exercise presidential authority. Furthermore, after Conkling's resignation, the Senate had adjourned without electing a president pro tempore, who would normally follow Arthur in the succession. Arthur was reluctant to be seen acting as president while Garfield lived, and for the next two months there was a void of authority in the executive office, with Garfield too weak to carry out his duties, and Arthur reluctant to assume them. Through the summer, Arthur refused to travel to Washington and was at his Lexington Avenue home when, on the night of September 19, he learned that Garfield had died. Judge John R. Brady of the New York Supreme Court administered the oath of office in Arthur's home at 2:15 a.m. on September 20. Later that day he took a train to Long Branch to pay his respects to Garfield and to leave a card of sympathy for his wife, afterwards returning to New York City. On September 21, he returned to Long Branch to take part in Garfield's funeral, and then joined the funeral train to Washington. Before leaving New York, he ensured the presidential line of succession by preparing and mailing to the White House a proclamation calling for a Senate special session. This step ensured that the Senate had legal authority to convene immediately and choose a Senate president pro tempore, who would be able to assume the presidency if Arthur died. Once in Washington he destroyed the mailed proclamation and issued a formal call for a special session.

== Presidency (1881–1885) ==
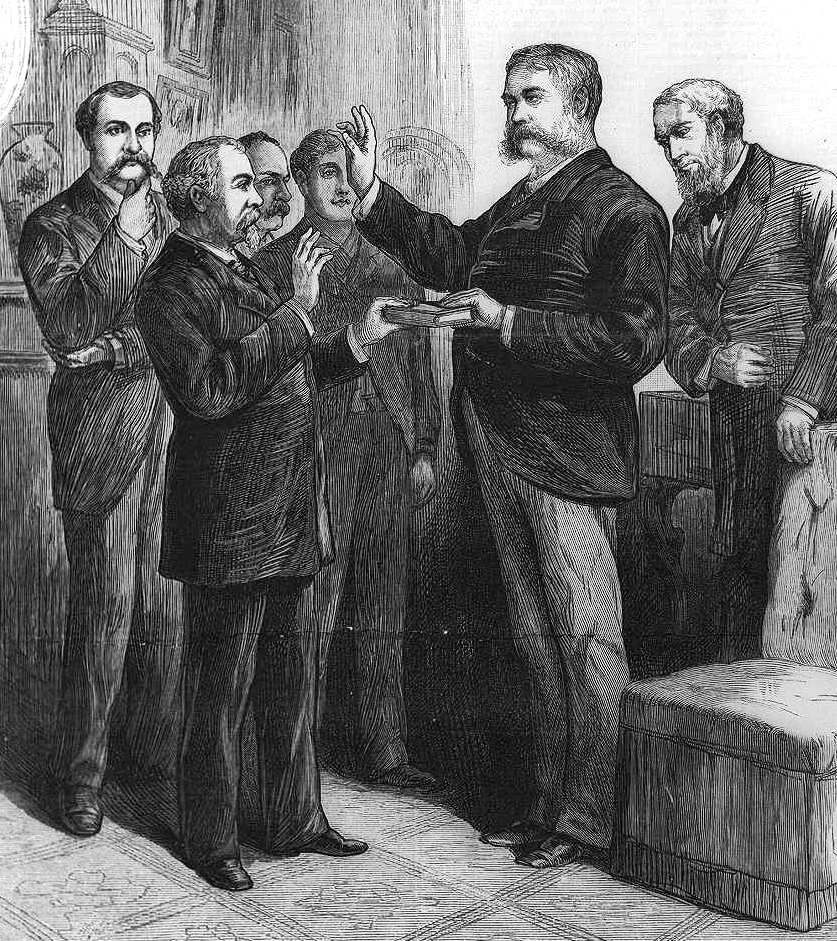
Arthur taking the presidential oath of office as administered by Judge John R. Brady at Arthur's home in New York City on September 20, 1881

=== Taking office ===
Arthur arrived in Washington, D.C., on September 21. On September 22, he re-took the oath of office, this time before Chief Justice Morrison R. Waite. Arthur took this step to ensure procedural compliance; there had been a lingering question about whether a state court judge (Brady) could administer a federal oath of office. (Note: One presidential oath was administered by a state court judge, also in New York City by a New York State judge: Robert Livingston, Chancellor of New York, administered the first presidential oath to George Washington at Federal Hall in 1789 (there were yet no federal judges). The only other presidential oath administered by someone other than a Federal justice or judge, the first swearing in of Calvin Coolidge in 1923 (by his father John Calvin Coolidge, Sr., a justice of the peace and notary public, in the family home), was also re-taken in Washington due to questions about the validity of the first oath. This second oath taking was done in secret, and did not become public knowledge until Harry M. Daugherty revealed it in 1932.) He initially took up residence at the home of Senator John P. Jones, while a White House remodeling he had ordered was carried out, including addition of an elaborate fifty-foot glass screen by Louis Comfort Tiffany.

Arthur's sister, Mary Arthur McElroy, served as White House hostess for her widowed brother; Arthur became Washington's most eligible bachelor and his social life became the subject of rumors, though romantically, he remained singularly devoted to the memory of his late wife. His son, Chester Jr., was then a freshman at Princeton University and his daughter, Nell, stayed in New York with a governess until 1882; when she arrived, Arthur shielded her from the intrusive press as much as he could.

Arthur quickly came into conflict with Garfield's cabinet, most of whom represented his opposition within the party. He asked the cabinet members to remain until December, when Congress would reconvene, but Treasury Secretary William Windom submitted his resignation in October to enter a Senate race in his home state of Minnesota. Arthur then selected Charles J. Folger, his friend and fellow New York Stalwart as Windom's replacement. (Note: Arthur first offered the post to Edwin D. Morgan, who had been his patron in New York; Morgan was confirmed by the Senate, but declined on the grounds of age. He died in 1883.) Attorney General Wayne MacVeagh was next to resign, believing that, as a reformer, he had no place in an Arthur cabinet. Despite Arthur's personal appeal to remain, MacVeagh resigned in December 1881 and Arthur replaced him with Benjamin H. Brewster, a Philadelphia lawyer and machine politician reputed to have reformist leanings. Blaine, nemesis of the Stalwart faction, remained Secretary of State until Congress reconvened and then departed immediately. Conkling expected Arthur to appoint him in Blaine's place, but the President chose Frederick T. Frelinghuysen of New Jersey, a Stalwart recommended by ex-President Grant. Frelinghuysen advised Arthur not to fill any future vacancies with Stalwarts, but when Postmaster General James resigned in January 1882, Arthur selected Timothy O. Howe, a Wisconsin Stalwart. Navy Secretary William H. Hunt was next to resign, in April 1882, and Arthur attempted a more balanced approach by appointing Half-Breed William E. Chandler to the post, on Blaine's recommendation. Finally, when Interior Secretary Samuel J. Kirkwood resigned that same month, Arthur appointed Henry M. Teller, a Colorado Stalwart to the office. Of the Cabinet members Arthur had inherited from Garfield, only Secretary of War Robert Todd Lincoln remained for the entirety of Arthur's term. Arthur could not appoint a new vice president to fill the vacancy, as this was prior to the 25th Amendment to the Constitution.

=== Civil service reform ===
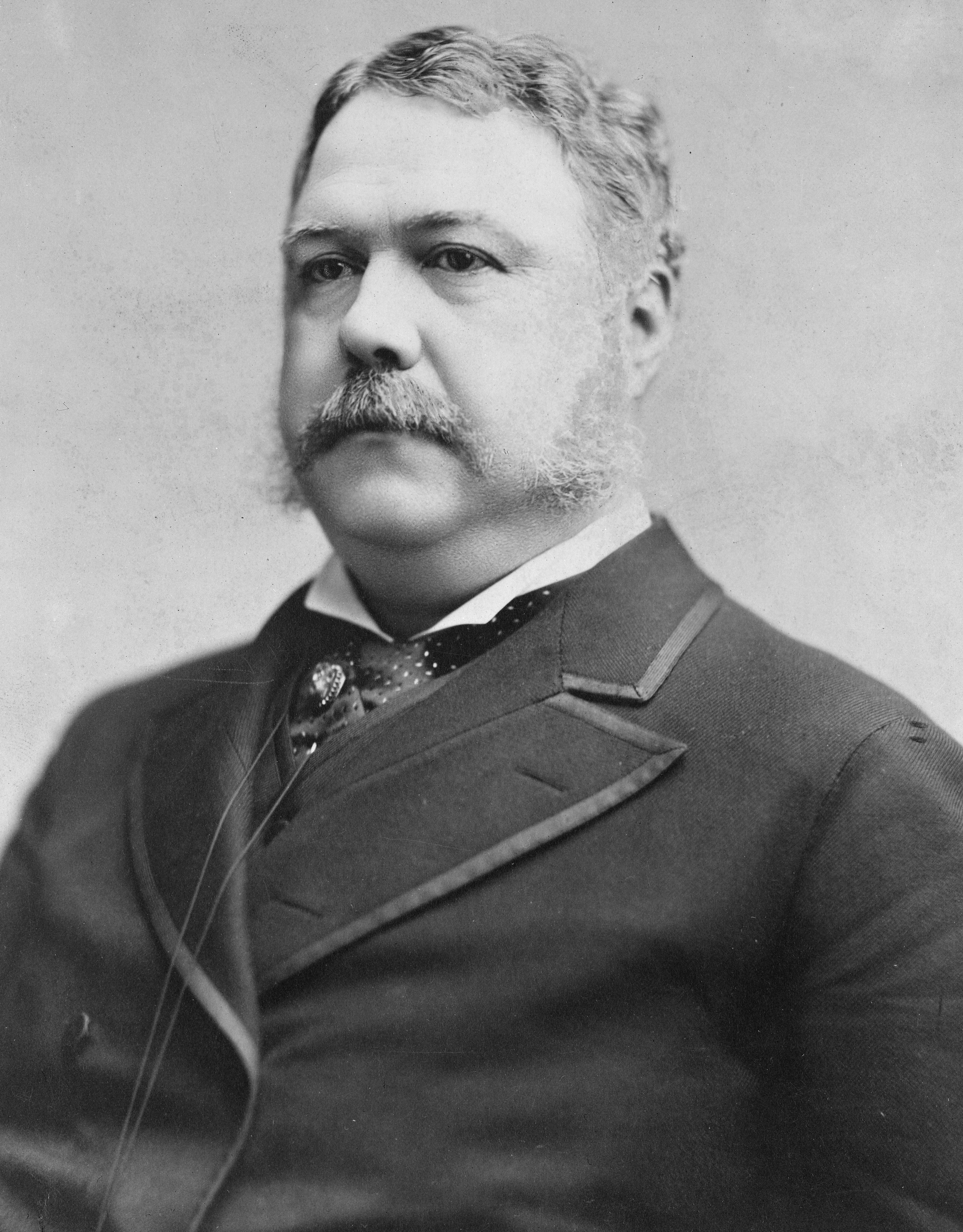
Arthur in 1882

In the 1870s, a scandal was exposed, in which contractors for star postal routes were greatly overpaid for their services with the connivance of government officials (including Second Assistant Postmaster General Thomas J. Brady and former senator Stephen Wallace Dorsey). Reformers feared Arthur, as a former supporter of the spoils system, would not commit to continuing the investigation into the scandal. But Arthur's Attorney General, Brewster, did in fact continue the investigations begun by MacVeagh, and hired notable Democratic lawyers William W. Ker and Richard T. Merrick to strengthen the prosecution team and forestall the skeptics. Although Arthur had worked closely with Dorsey before his presidency, once in office he supported the investigation and forced the resignation of officials suspected in the scandal. An 1882 trial of the ringleaders resulted in convictions for two minor conspirators and a hung jury for the rest. After a juror came forward with allegations that the defendants attempted to bribe him, the judge set aside the guilty verdicts and granted a new trial. Before the second trial began, Arthur removed five federal office holders who were sympathetic with the defense, including a former senator. The second trial began in December 1882 and lasted until July 1883 and, again, did not result in a guilty verdict. Failure to obtain a conviction tarnished the administration's image, but Arthur did succeed in putting a stop to the fraud.

Garfield's assassination by a deranged office seeker amplified the public demand for civil service reform. Both Democratic and Republican leaders realized that they could attract the votes of reformers by turning against the spoils system and, by 1882, a bipartisan effort began in favor of reform. In 1880, Democratic Senator George H. Pendleton of Ohio introduced legislation that required selection of civil servants based on merit as determined by an examination. This legislation greatly expanded similar civil service reforms attempted by President Franklin Pierce 30 years earlier. In his first annual presidential address to Congress in 1881, Arthur requested civil service reform legislation and Pendleton again introduced his bill, but Congress did not pass it. Republicans lost seats in the 1882 congressional elections, in which Democrats campaigned on the reform issue. As a result, the lame-duck session of Congress was more amenable to civil service reform; the Senate approved Pendleton's bill 38–5 and the House soon concurred by a vote of 155–47. Arthur signed the Pendleton Civil Service Reform Act into law on January 16, 1883. In just two years' time, an unrepentant Stalwart had become the president who ushered in long-awaited civil service reform.

At first, the act applied only to 10% of federal jobs and, without proper implementation by the president, it could have gone no further. Even after he signed the act into law, its proponents doubted Arthur's commitment to reform. To their surprise, he acted quickly to appoint the members of the Civil Service Commission that the law created, naming reformers Dorman Bridgman Eaton, John Milton Gregory, and Leroy D. Thoman as commissioners. The chief examiner, Silas W. Burt, was a long-time reformer who had been Arthur's opponent when the two men worked at the New York Custom House. The commission issued its first rules in May 1883; by 1884, half of all postal officials and three-quarters of the Customs Service jobs were to be awarded by merit. That year, Arthur expressed satisfaction with the new system, praising its effectiveness "in securing competent and faithful public servants and in protecting the appointing officers of the Government from the pressure of personal importunity and from the labor of examining the claims and pretensions of rival candidates for public employment."

=== Surplus and the tariff ===
With high revenue held over from wartime taxes, the federal government had collected more than it spent since 1866; by 1882 the surplus reached $145 million. Opinions varied on how to balance the budget; the Democrats wished to lower tariffs, in order to reduce revenues and the cost of imported goods, while Republicans believed that high tariffs ensured high wages in manufacturing and mining. They preferred the government spend more on internal improvements and reduce excise taxes. Arthur agreed with his party, and in 1882 called for the abolition of excise taxes on everything except liquor, as well as a simplification of the complex tariff structure. In May of that year, Representative William D. Kelley of Pennsylvania introduced a bill to establish a tariff commission; the bill passed and Arthur signed it into law but appointed mostly protectionists to the committee. Republicans were pleased with the committee's make-up but were surprised when, in December 1882, they submitted a report to Congress calling for tariff cuts averaging between 20 and 25%. The commission's recommendations were ignored, however, as the House Ways and Means Committee, dominated by protectionists, provided a 10% reduction. After conference with the Senate, the bill that emerged only reduced tariffs by an average of 1.47%. The bill passed both houses narrowly on March 3, 1883, the last full day of the 47th Congress; Arthur signed the measure into law, with no effect on the surplus.

Congress attempted to balance the budget from the other side of the ledger, with increased spending on the 1882 Rivers and Harbors Act in the unprecedented amount of $19 million. While Arthur was not opposed to internal improvements, the scale of the bill disturbed him, as did its narrow focus on "particular localities," rather than projects that benefited a larger part of the nation. On August 1, 1882, Arthur vetoed the bill to widespread popular acclaim; in his veto message, his principal objection was that it appropriated funds for purposes "not for the common defense or general welfare, and which do not promote commerce among the States." Congress overrode his veto the next day and the new law reduced the surplus by $19 million. Republicans considered the law a success at the time, but later concluded that it contributed to their loss of seats in the elections of 1882.

=== Foreign affairs and immigration ===
During the Garfield administration, Secretary of State James G. Blaine attempted to invigorate United States diplomacy in Latin America, urging reciprocal trade agreements and offering to mediate disputes among the Latin American nations. Blaine, venturing a greater involvement in affairs south of the Rio Grande, proposed a Pan-American conference in 1882 to discuss trade and an end to the War of the Pacific being fought by Bolivia, Chile, and Peru. Blaine did not remain in office long enough to see the effort through, and when Frelinghuysen replaced him at the end of 1881, the conference efforts lapsed. Frelinghuysen also discontinued Blaine's peace efforts in the War of the Pacific, fearing that the United States might be drawn into the conflict. Arthur and Frelinghuysen continued Blaine's efforts to encourage trade among the nations of the Western Hemisphere; a treaty with Mexico providing for reciprocal tariff reductions was signed in 1882 and approved by the Senate in 1884. Legislation required to bring the treaty into force failed in the House, however, rendering it a dead letter. Similar efforts at reciprocal trade treaties with Santo Domingo and Spain's American colonies were defeated by February 1885, and an existing reciprocity treaty with the Kingdom of Hawaii was allowed to lapse.

The 47th Congress spent a great deal of time on immigration, and at times was in accord with Arthur. In July 1882 Congress easily passed a bill regulating steamships that carried immigrants to the United States. To their surprise, Arthur vetoed it and requested revisions, which they made and Arthur then approved. He also signed in August of that year the Immigration Act of 1882, which levied a 50-cent tax on immigrants to the United States, and excluded from entry the mentally ill, the intellectually disabled, criminals, or any other person potentially dependent upon public assistance.

A more contentious debate materialized over the status of Chinese immigrants; in January 1868, the Senate had ratified the Burlingame Treaty with China, allowing an unrestricted flow of Chinese into the country. As the economy soured after the Panic of 1873, Chinese immigrants were blamed for depressing workmen's wages; in reaction Congress in 1879 attempted to abrogate the 1868 treaty by passing the Chinese Exclusion Act, but President Hayes vetoed it. Three years later, after China had agreed to treaty revisions, Congress tried again to exclude working class Chinese laborers; Senator John F. Miller of California introduced another Chinese Exclusion Act that blocked entry of Chinese laborers for a twenty-year period. The bill passed the Senate and House by overwhelming margins, but this as well was vetoed by Arthur, who concluded the 20-year ban to be a breach of the renegotiated treaty of 1880. That treaty allowed only a "reasonable" suspension of immigration. Eastern newspapers praised the veto, while it was condemned in the Western states. Congress was unable to override the veto, but passed a new bill reducing the immigration ban to ten years. Although he still objected to this denial of entry to Chinese laborers, Arthur acceded to the compromise measure, signing the Chinese Exclusion Act into law on May 6, 1882. The Chinese Exclusion Act attempted to stop all Chinese immigration into the United States for ten years, with exceptions for diplomats, teachers, students, merchants, and travelers. It was widely evaded. (Note: The portion of the law denying citizenship to Chinese-American children born in the United States was later found unconstitutional in United States v. Wong Kim Ark in 1898.)

=== Naval resurgence ===
In the years following the Civil War, American naval power declined precipitously, shrinking from nearly 700 vessels to just 52, most of which were obsolete. The nation's military focus over the fifteen years before Garfield and Arthur's election had been on the Indian wars in the Western United States, rather than the high seas, but as the region was increasingly pacified, many in Congress grew concerned at the poor state of the Navy. Garfield's Secretary of the Navy, William H. Hunt advocated reform of the Navy.

In his 1881 annual message, Arthur advocated a stronger Navy. He gave full authority to his new Secretary of Navy William E. Chandler, Hunt's successor. Chandler, an aggressive administrator, purged the Navy of wood-and-canvas warship supporters and created the Naval War College.

Chandler appointed an advisory board to prepare a report on modernization, whose goal was to create a Navy that would protect America thousands of miles away, rather than just coastal waters. Based on the suggestions in the report, Congress appropriated funds, signed into law by Arthur, for the construction of three steel protected cruisers (Atlanta, Boston, and Chicago) and an armed dispatch-steamer (Dolphin), collectively known as the ABCD Ships or the Squadron of Evolution. (Note: Earlier in 1874, during the Grant administration, Congress approved funds to rebuild four monitors (Puritan, Amphitrite, Monadnock, and Terror), which had lain uncompleted since 1877.) The contracts to build the ABCD ships were all awarded to the low bidder, John Roach & Sons of Chester, Pennsylvania, even though Roach once employed Secretary Chandler as a lobbyist. Democrats turned against the "New Navy" projects and, when they won control of the 48th Congress, refused to appropriate funds for seven more steel warships. Even without the additional ships, the state of the Navy improved when, after several construction delays, the last of the new ships entered service in 1889. Chandler scrapped costly outdated vessels, exclaiming he did his "best work in destroying the old navy".

During Arthur's term, the U.S. Signal Corps promoted the Lady Franklin Bay Expedition, a scientific polar expedition to the Arctic. During the expedition, two members of the crew reached a new Farthest North record, but of the original twenty-five men, only seven survived to return.

=== Civil rights ===
Like his Republican predecessors, Arthur struggled with the question of how his party was to challenge the Democrats in the South and how, if at all, to protect the civil rights of black southerners. Since the end of Reconstruction, conservative white Democrats (or "Bourbon Democrats") had regained power in the South, and the Republican party dwindled rapidly as their primary supporters in the region, blacks, were disenfranchised. One crack in the solidly Democratic South emerged with the growth of a new party, the Readjusters, in Virginia. Having won an election in that state on a platform of more education funding (for black and white schools alike) and abolition of the poll tax and the whipping post, many northern Republicans saw the Readjusters as a more viable ally in the South than the moribund southern Republican party. Arthur agreed, and directed the federal patronage in Virginia through the Readjusters rather than the Republicans. He followed the same pattern in other Southern states, forging coalitions with independents and Greenback Party members. Some black Republicans felt betrayed by the pragmatic gambit, but others (including Frederick Douglass and ex-Senator Blanche K. Bruce) endorsed the administration's actions, as the Southern independents had more liberal racial policies than the Democrats. Arthur's coalition policy was only successful in Virginia, however, and by 1885 the Readjuster movement began to collapse with the election of a Democratic president.

Other federal action on behalf of blacks was equally ineffective: when the Supreme Court struck down the Civil Rights Act of 1875 in the Civil Rights Cases (1883), Arthur expressed his disagreement with the decision in a message to Congress, but was unable to persuade Congress to pass any new legislation in its place. Arthur did, however, effectively intervene to overturn a court-martial ruling against a black West Point cadet, Johnson Whittaker, after the Judge Advocate General of the Army, David G. Swaim, found the prosecution's case against Whittaker to be illegal and based on racial bias. The administration faced a different challenge in the West, where the LDS Church was under government pressure to stop the practice of polygamy in Utah Territory. Garfield had believed polygamy was criminal behavior and was morally detrimental to family values, and Arthur's views were, for once, in line with his predecessor's. In 1882, he signed the Edmunds Act into law; the legislation made polygamy a federal crime, barring polygamists both from public office and the right to vote.

=== Native American policy ===
The Arthur administration was challenged by changing relations with western Native American tribes. The American Indian Wars were winding down, and public sentiment was shifting toward more favorable treatment of Native Americans. Arthur urged Congress to increase funding for Native American education, which it did in 1884, although not to the extent he wished. He also favored a move to the allotment system, under which individual Native Americans, rather than tribes, would own land. Arthur was unable to convince Congress to adopt the idea during his administration but, in 1887, the Dawes Act changed the law to favor such a system. The allotment system was favored by liberal reformers at the time, but eventually proved detrimental to Native Americans as most of their land was resold at low prices to white speculators. During Arthur's presidency, settlers and cattle ranchers continued to encroach on Native American territory. Arthur initially resisted their efforts, but after Secretary of the Interior Henry M. Teller, an opponent of allotment, assured him that the lands were not protected, Arthur opened up the Crow Creek Reservation in the Dakota Territory to settlers by executive order in 1885. Arthur's successor, Grover Cleveland, finding that title belonged to the Native Americans, revoked Arthur's order a few months later.

=== Health and travel ===
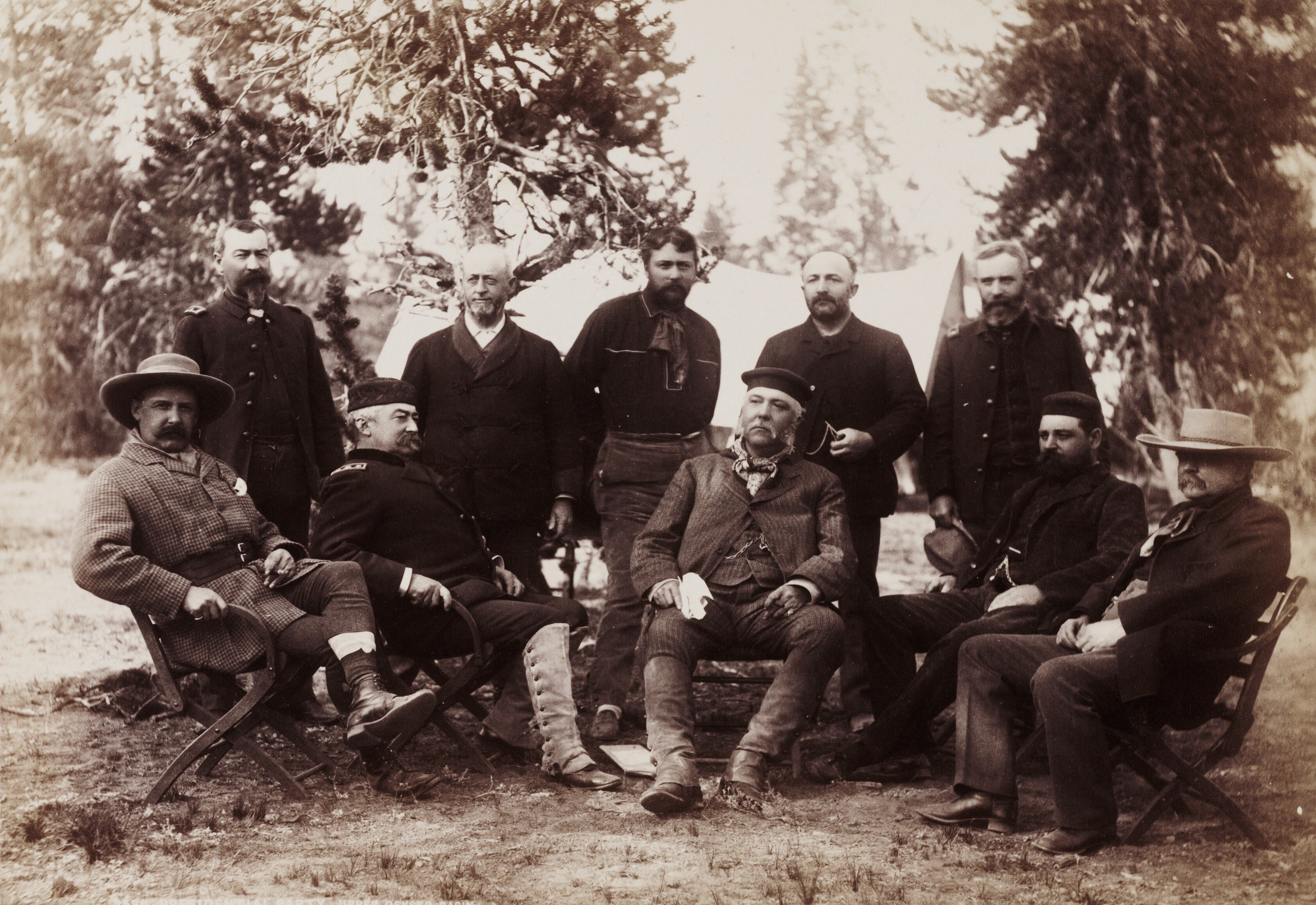
Arthur on an expedition in Yellowstone National Park along with Philip Sheridan and Robert Todd Lincoln

Shortly after becoming president, Arthur was diagnosed with Bright's disease, a kidney ailment now referred to as nephritis. He attempted to keep his condition private, but by 1883 rumors of his illness began to circulate; he had become thinner and more aged in appearance, and struggled to keep the pace of the presidency. To rejuvenate his health outside the confines of Washington, Arthur and some political friends traveled to Florida in April 1883. The vacation had the opposite effect, and Arthur suffered from intense pain before returning to Washington. Later that year, on the advice of Missouri Senator George Graham Vest, he visited Yellowstone National Park. Reporters accompanied the presidential party, helping to publicize the new National Park system. The Yellowstone trip was more beneficial to Arthur's health than his Florida excursion, and he returned to Washington refreshed after two months of travel.

=== Judicial appointments ===
Arthur made appointments to fill two vacancies on the United States Supreme Court. The first vacancy arose in July 1881 with the death of Associate Justice Nathan Clifford, a Democrat who had been a member of the Court since before the Civil War. Arthur nominated Horace Gray, a distinguished jurist from the Massachusetts Supreme Judicial Court to replace him, and the nomination was easily confirmed. Gray would serve on the Court for over 20 years until resigning in 1902. The second vacancy occurred when Associate Justice Ward Hunt retired in January 1882. Arthur first nominated his old political boss, Roscoe Conkling; he doubted that Conkling would accept, but felt obligated to offer a high office to his former patron. The Senate confirmed the nomination but, as expected, Conkling declined it, the last time a confirmed nominee declined an appointment. Senator George Edmunds was Arthur's next choice, but he declined to be considered. Instead, Arthur nominated Samuel Blatchford, who had been a judge on the Second Circuit Court of Appeals for the prior four years. Blatchford accepted, and his nomination was approved by the Senate within two weeks. Blatchford served on the Court until his death in 1893.

== 1884 presidential campaign ==
As the 1884 presidential election approached, James G. Blaine was considered the favorite for the Republican nomination, but Arthur, too, contemplated a run for a full term as president. In the months leading up to the 1884 Republican National Convention, however, Arthur began to realize that neither faction of the Republican party was prepared to give him their full support: the Half-Breeds were again solidly behind Blaine, while Stalwarts were undecided; some backed Arthur, with others considering Senator John A. Logan of Illinois. Reform-minded Republicans, friendlier to Arthur after he endorsed civil service reform, were still not certain enough of his reform credentials to back him over Senator George F. Edmunds of Vermont, who had long favored their cause. Business leaders supported him, as did Southern Republicans who owed their jobs to his control of the patronage, but by the time they began to rally around him, Arthur had decided against a serious campaign for the nomination. He kept up a token effort, believing that to drop out would cast doubt on his actions in office and raise questions about his health, but by the time the convention began in June, his defeat was assured. Blaine led on the first ballot, and by the fourth ballot he had a majority of 541 votes, while Arthur only received 207. Arthur telegraphed his congratulations to Blaine and accepted his defeat with equanimity. He played no role in the 1884 campaign, which Blaine would later blame for his loss that November to the Democratic nominee, New York governor Grover Cleveland.

== Post-presidency (1885–1886) ==
Arthur left office in 1885 and returned to his New York City home. Two months before the end of his term, several New York Stalwarts approached him to request that he run for United States Senate, but he declined, preferring to return to his old law practice at Arthur, Knevals & Ransom. His health limited his activity with the firm, and Arthur served only of counsel. He took on few assignments with the firm and was often too ill to leave his house. He managed a few public appearances until the end of 1885.

=== Death ===
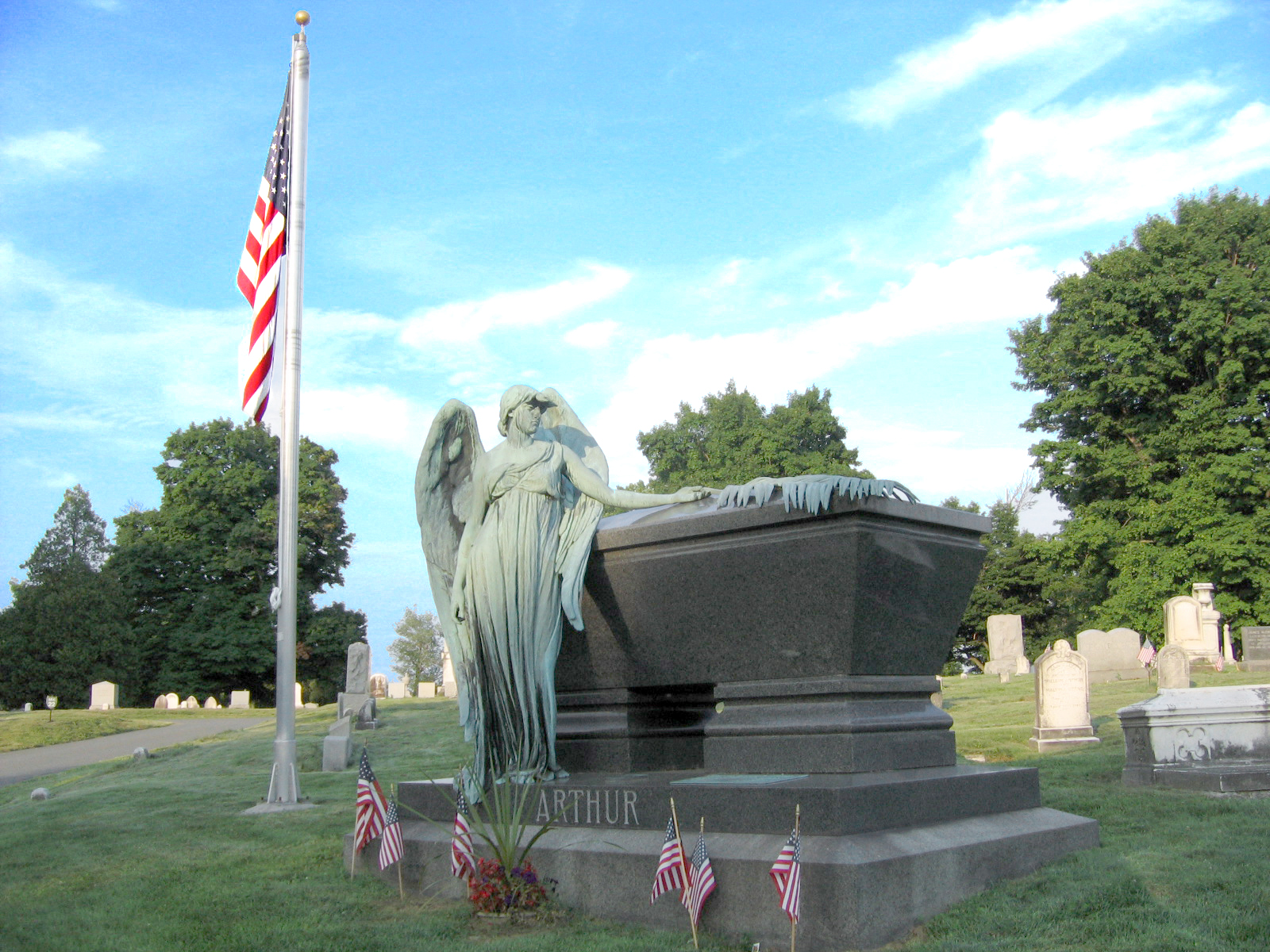
Arthur's grave at Albany Rural Cemetery in Menands, New York

After spending the summer of 1886 in New London, Connecticut, he returned home where he became seriously ill, and on November 16, ordered nearly all of his papers, both personal and official, burned. (Note: A small number of Arthur's papers survived and passed to his grandson, Gavin Arthur (born Chester Alan Arthur III), who allowed Arthur's biographer, Thomas C. Reeves, to examine them in the 1970s.) The next morning, Arthur suffered a cerebral hemorrhage and never regained consciousness. He died the following day, on November 18, at the age of 57. On November 22, a private funeral was held at the Church of the Heavenly Rest in New York City, attended by President Cleveland and ex-President Hayes, among other notables. Arthur was buried with his family members and ancestors in the Albany Rural Cemetery in Menands, New York. (Note: On his grave marker, his birth year is incorrectly given as 1830.) He was laid beside his wife in a sarcophagus on a large corner of the plot. In 1889, a monument was placed on Arthur's burial plot by sculptor Ephraim Keyser of New York, consisting of a giant bronze female angel figure placing a bronze palm leaf on a granite sarcophagus.

Arthur's post-presidency was the second-shortest of all presidents who lived past their presidencies, having lived one year and eight months after his departure from office, after that of James K. Polk who died three months after leaving office.

== Political views ==
A conservative, Arthur became linked to the Stalwart wing of the Republican Party during the 1860s and 1870s, which supported Ulysses S. Grant and his administration's conservative policies.

== Legacy ==
Several Grand Army of the Republic posts were named for Arthur, including Goff, Kansas, Lawrence, Nebraska, Medford, Oregon, and Ogdensburg, Wisconsin. On April 5, 1882, Arthur was elected to the District of Columbia Commandery of the Military Order of the Loyal Legion of the United States (MOLLUS) as a Third Class Companion (insignia number 02430), the honorary membership category for militia officers and civilians who made significant contributions to the war effort.

Union College awarded Arthur the honorary degree of LL.D. in 1883.

In 1898, the Arthur memorial statue—a fifteen-foot (4.6 m), bronze figure of Arthur standing on a Barre Granite pedestal—was created by sculptor George Edwin Bissell and installed at Madison Square, in New York City. The statue was dedicated in 1899 and unveiled by Arthur's sister, Mary Arthur McElroy. At the dedication, Secretary of War Elihu Root described Arthur as, "...wise in statesmanship and firm and effective in administration," while acknowledging that Arthur was isolated in office and unloved by his own party.

In 1938, the U.S. Post Office issued a definitive stamp in his honor. In 2012, Arthur's likeness was used on a U.S. one dollar coin.

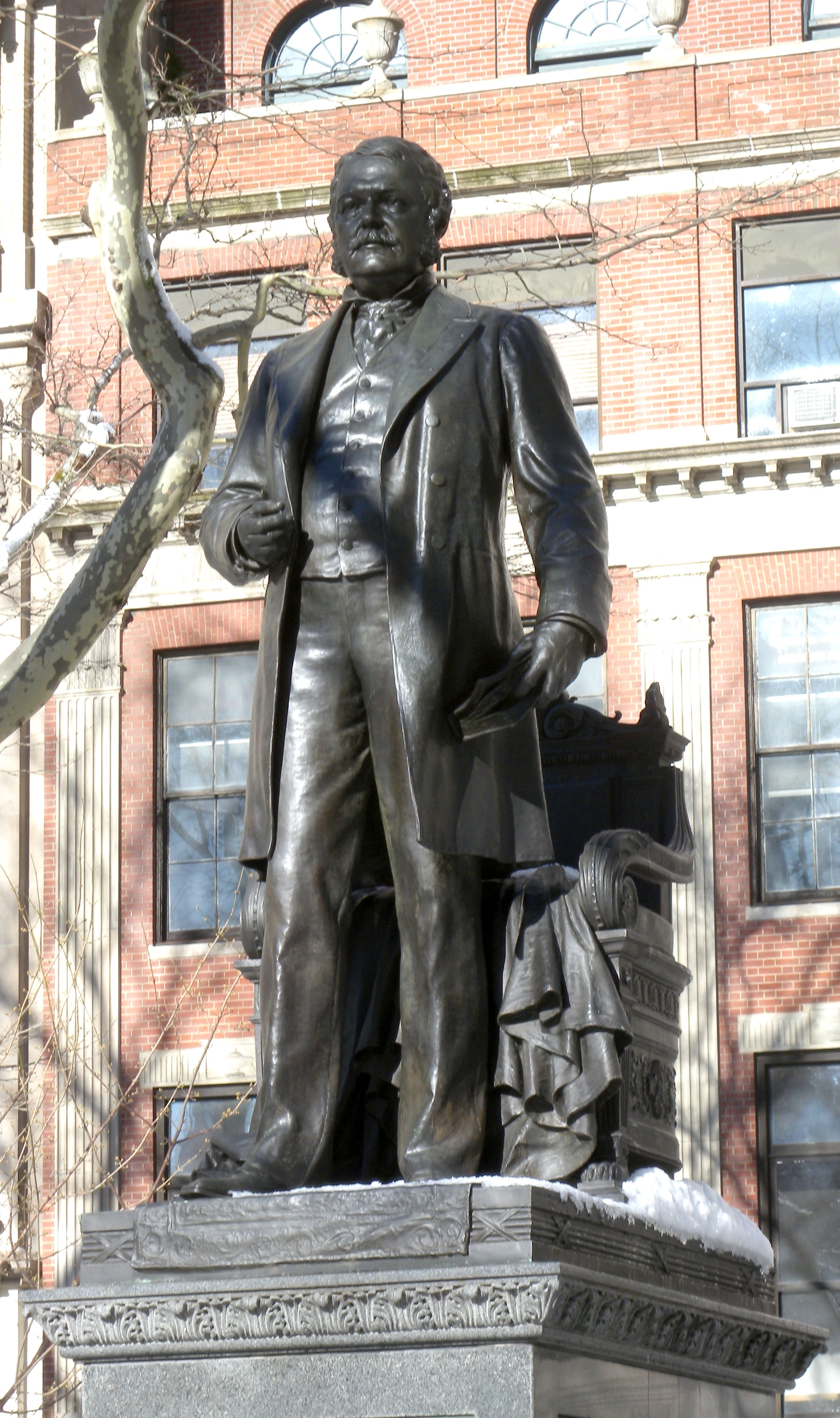
Statue of Arthur at Madison Square Park in New York City, cast in 1898

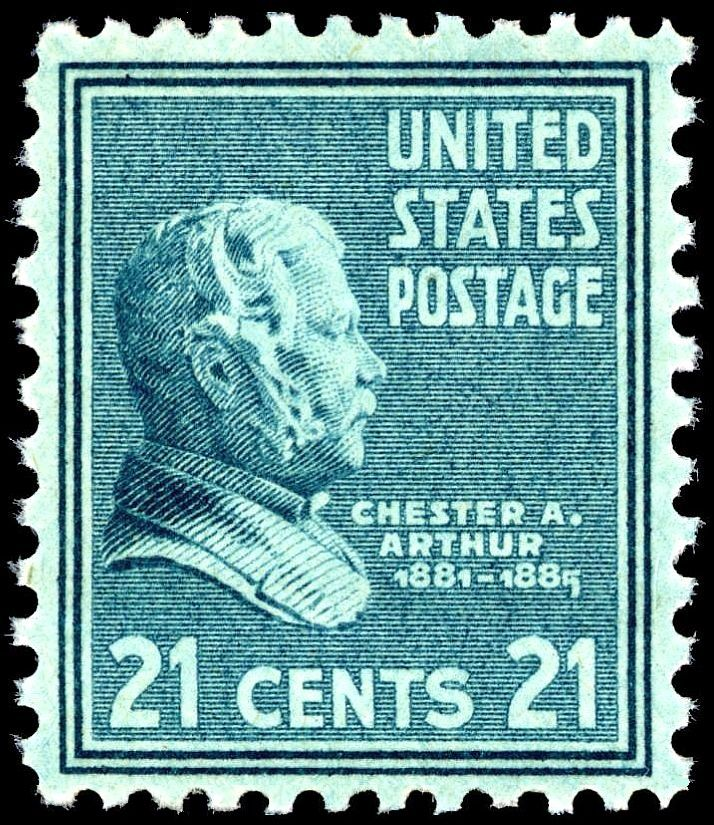
Stamp of Arthur, issued in 1938

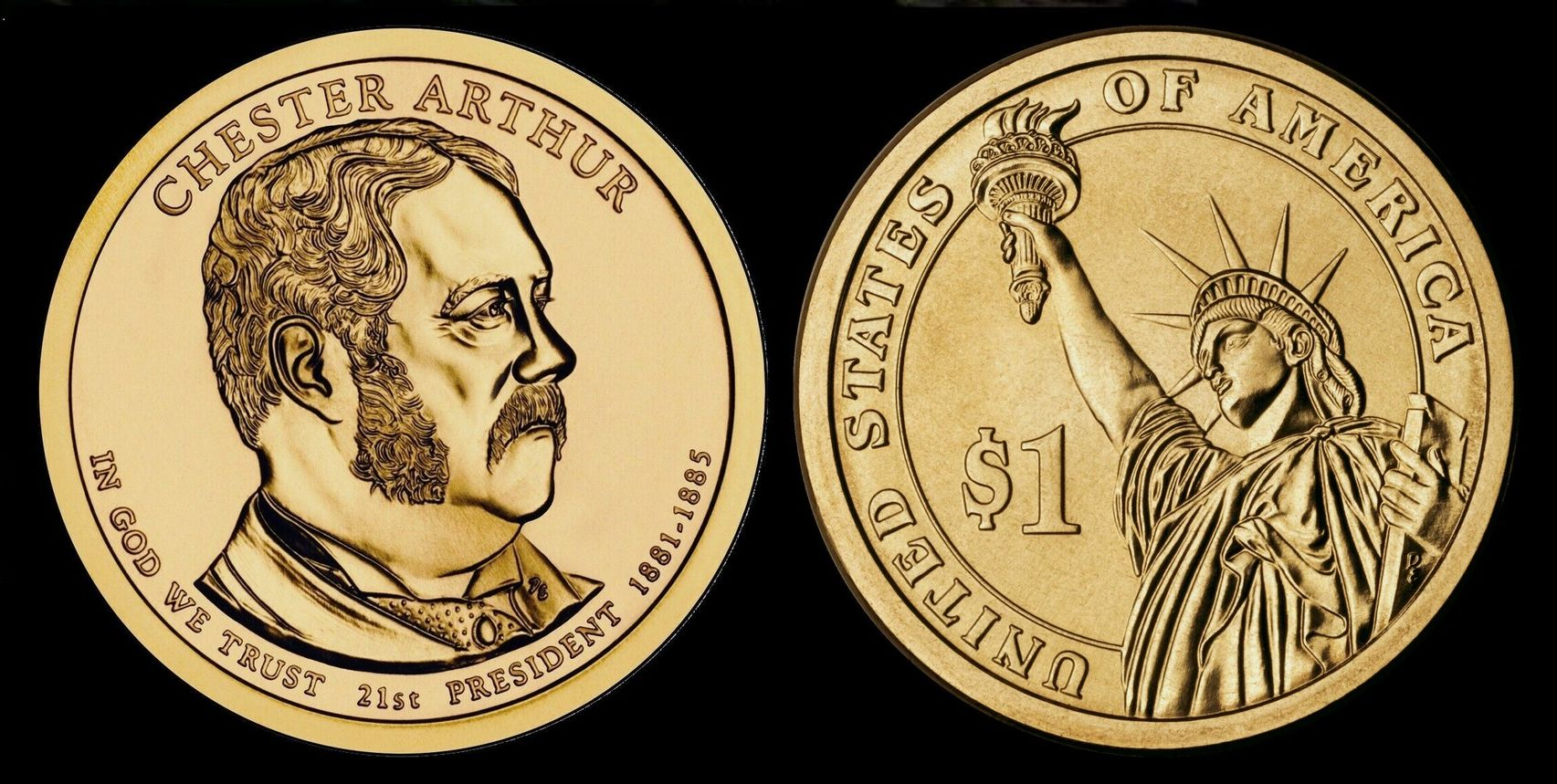
Presidential dollar coin of Arthur, minted in 2012

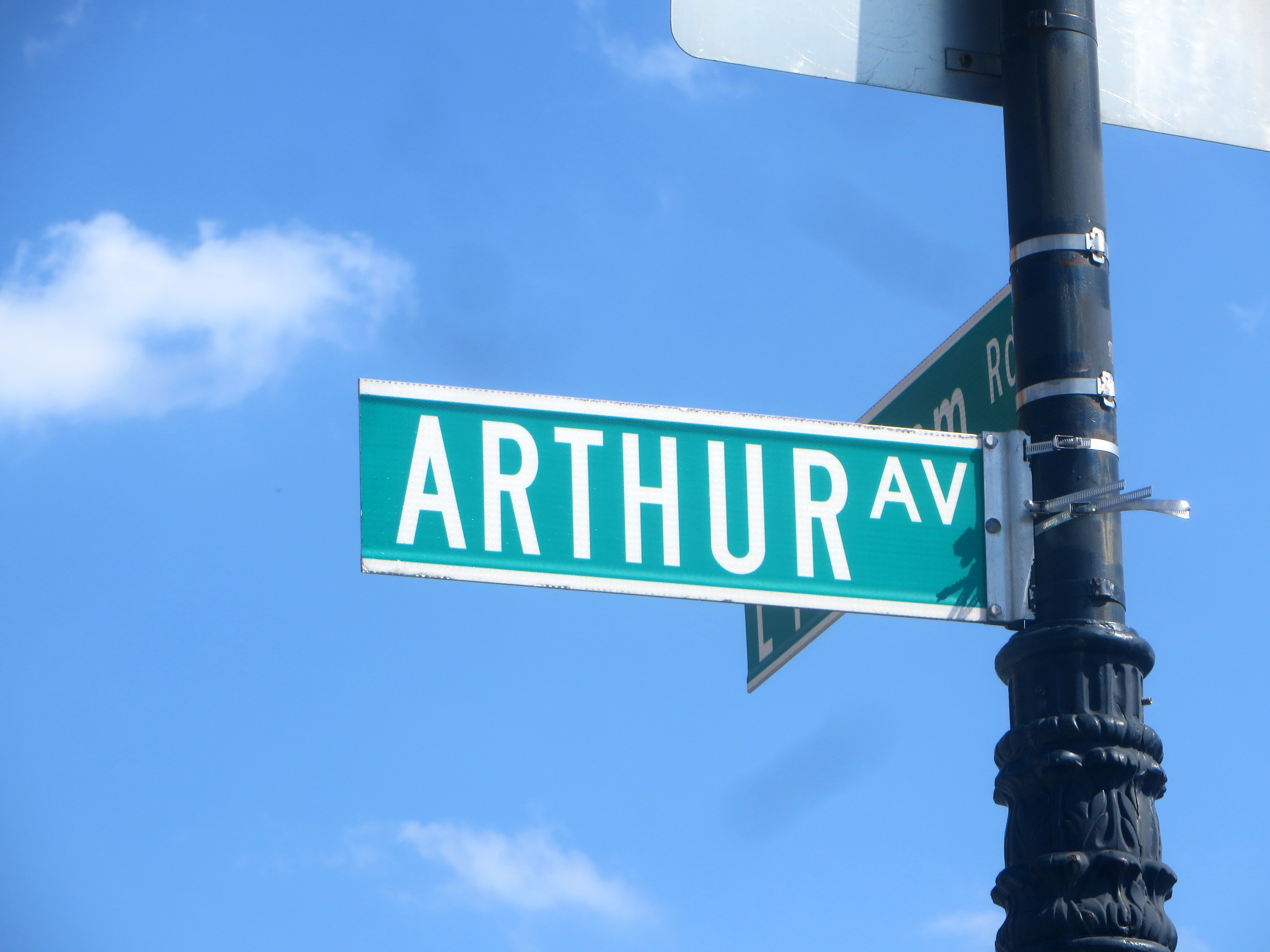
Arthur Avenue in the Bronx was named for President Arthur

Arthur's general unpopularity during his presidency carried over into his assessment by various historians, and his reputation after leaving office mostly disappeared. By 1935, historian George F. Howe said that Arthur had achieved "an obscurity in strange contrast to his significant part in American history". By 1975, however, Thomas C. Reeves would write that Arthur's "appointments, if unspectacular, were unusually sound; the corruption and scandal that dominated business and politics of the period did not tarnish his administration." As 2004 biographer Zachary Karabell wrote, although Arthur was "physically stretched and emotionally strained, he strove to do what was right for the country." Indeed, Howe had earlier surmised, "Arthur adopted [a code] for his own political behavior but subject to three restraints: he remained to everyone a man of his word; he kept scrupulously free from corrupt graft; he maintained a personal dignity, affable and genial though he might be. These restraints ... distinguished him sharply from the stereotype politician."

Journalist Alexander McClure wrote, "No man ever entered the Presidency so profoundly and widely distrusted as Chester Alan Arthur, and no one ever retired ... more generally respected, alike by political friend and foe." The New York World summed up Arthur's presidency at his death in 1886: "No duty was neglected in his administration, and no adventurous project alarmed the nation." Mark Twain wrote of him, "It would be hard indeed to better President Arthur's administration." Evaluations by modern historians generally rank Arthur as a mediocre or average president. Arthur has also been described as one of the least memorable presidents.

Arthur's townhouse, the Chester A. Arthur Home, was sold to William Randolph Hearst. Since 1944, it has been the location of Kalustyan's Spice Emporium.

=== In media ===
Arthur was portrayed by Nick Offerman in the 2025 Netflix historical drama miniseries Death by Lightning.

== See also ==
- Arthur Cottage, ancestral home, Cullybackey, County Antrim, Northern Ireland
- Julia Sand, correspondence with Arthur
- List of presidents of the United States
- List of presidents of the United States by previous experience

== Bibliography ==
=== Books ===
- Abbot, Willis J. (1896). The Naval History of the United States. Vol. 2. Peter Fenelon Collier. OCLC 3453791.
- Ayers, Edward L. (2007) [1992]. The Promise of the New South: Life After Reconstruction. New York: Oxford University Press, US. ISBN 978-0-19-532688-8.
- Doyle, Burton T.; Swaney, Homer H. (1881). Lives of James A. Garfield and Chester A. Arthur. Washington, D.C.: Rufus H. Darby.
- Doenecke, Justus D. (1981). The Presidencies of James A. Garfield and Chester A. Arthur. Lawrence: University Press of Kansas. ISBN 978-0-7006-0208-7.
- Feldman, Ruth Tenzer (2006). Chester A. Arthur. Twenty-First Century Books. ISBN 978-0-8225-1512-8.
- Ferris, Gary W. (1999). Presidential Places: A Guide to the Historic Sites of U.S. Presidents. Chicago: R. R. Donnelly and Sons. ISBN 978-0-89587-176-3.
- Fisher, Louis (2014). The Law of the Executive Branch: Presidential Power. New York: Oxford University Press. ISBN 978-0-19-985621-3.
- Hambley, Del (2008). Presidential Footprints. Indianapolis, IN: Dog ear Publishing. ISBN 978-159858-800-2.
- Hoogenboom, Ari (1995). Rutherford Hayes: Warrior and President. Lawrence: University Press of Kansas. ISBN 978-0-7006-0641-2.
- Howe, George F. (1966) [1935]. Chester A. Arthur, A Quarter-Century of Machine Politics. New York: F. Ungar Pub. Co. ASIN B00089DVIG.
- Hudson, David L. (2012). The Handy Presidents Answer Book. Canton, MI: Visible Ink Press. p. 246. ISBN 978-1-57859-317-0.
- Jordan, David M. (1988). Winfield Scott Hancock: A Soldier's Life. Bloomfield: Indiana University Press. ISBN 978-0-253-36580-4.
- Karabell, Zachary (2004). Chester Alan Arthur. New York: Henry Holt & Co. ISBN 978-0-8050-6951-8.
- McCabe, James D. (1881). Our Martyred President ... : The Life and Public Services of Gen. James A. Garfield. National Publishing Company.
- Reeves, Thomas C. (1975). Gentleman Boss: The Life of Chester A. Arthur. New York: Alfred A. Knopf. ISBN 978-0-394-46095-6.
- Rhodes, James Ford. History of the United States from the Compromise of 1850: 1877–1896 (1919) online complete; old, factual and heavily political, by winner of Pulitzer Prize
- University of the State of New York (1883). Annual Report of the Board of Regents. Vol. 96. Albany, NY: Weed, Parsons & Company.
- Vermont Bureau of Publicity (1913). Vermont: The Land of Green Mountains. Montpelier: Vermont Secretary of State.
- Weisberger, Bernard A. (2002). Henry F. Graff (ed.). The Presidents A Reference History James A. Garfield and Chester A. Arthur. Charles Scribner's Sons.

=== Articles ===
- Bastert, Russell H. (March 1956). "Diplomatic Reversal: Frelinghuysen's Opposition to Blaine's Pan-American Policy in 1882". The Mississippi Valley Historical Review. 42 (4): 653–671. doi:10.2307/1889232. JSTOR 1889232.
- "Chester A. Arthur". New York City Statues. Archived from the original on October 13, 2012.
- Easley-Walsh, Megan (February 2022). "Chester Alan Arthur: The forgotten American President who Changed the World through two Conferences (the International Meridian Conference of 1884 and the Berlin Africa Conference of 1884–1885)" (PDF). Prague Papers on the History of International Relations.
- Hutchinson, C.P. (April 1947). "The Present Status of Our Immigration Laws and Policies". The Milbank Memorial Fund Quarterly. 25 (2): 161–173. doi:10.2307/3348178. JSTOR 3348178.
- Jampoler, Andrew C.A. (August 2010). "Disaster at Lady Franklin Bay". Naval History Magazine. Vol. 24, no. 4. U.S. Naval Institute.
- Johnson, Rossiter, ed. (1906). "Arthur, Chester Alan". The Biographical Dictionary of America. Vol. 1. Boston: American Biographical Society. pp. 146–151.
- Marszalek, John F. Jr. (August 1971). "A Black Cadet At West Point". American Heritage. 22 (5).
- Peskin, Allan (Winter 1984). "Who Were the Stalwarts? Who Were Their Rivals? Republican Factions in the Gilded Age". Political Science Quarterly. 99 (4): 703–716. doi:10.2307/2150708. JSTOR 2150708.
- Reeves, Thomas C. (Summer 1972). "The Search for the Chester Alan Arthur Papers". The Wisconsin Magazine of History. 55 (4): 310–319. JSTOR 4634741.
- Reeves, Thomas C. (July 1, 1970). "The Diaries of Malvina Arthur: Windows Into The Past of Our 21st President" (PDF). Proceedings of the Vermont Historical Society. Montpelier: Vermont Historical Society.
- Reeves, Thomas C. (Autumn 1970). "The Mystery of Chester Alan Arthur's Birthplace" (PDF). Vermont History. 38 (4).
- Schwartz, Sybil (Autumn 1978). "In Defense of Chester Arthur". The Wilson Quarterly. 2 (4): 180–184. JSTOR 40255548.
- Stuart, Paul (September 1977). "United States Indian Policy: From the Dawes Act to the American Indian Policy Review Commission". Social Service Review. 51 (3): 451–463. doi:10.1086/643524. JSTOR 30015511. S2CID 143506388.
- Theriault, Sean M. (February 2003). "Patronage, the Pendleton Act, and the Power of the People". The Journal of Politics. 65 (1): 50–68. doi:10.1111/1468-2508.t01-1-00003. JSTOR 3449855. S2CID 153890814.
- Todd, A. L. (June 1960). "Ordeal In The Arctic". American Heritage. Vol. 11, no. 4.

=== Newspapers ===
- "Afternoon Dispatches: Pleasanton". The Tribune. Lawrence, KS. July 9, 1871. p. 2.
- "Republican State Committee: Gen. Chester A. Arthur Elected Chairman – Campaign Plans". The Sun. New York. September 12, 1879. p. 2.
- "Organization of the Republican State Committee". Boston Post. Boston, MA. October 12, 1881. p. 1.
- "The New Administration; President Arthur Formally Inaugurated" (PDF). The New York Times. September 22, 1881.
- "The Loyal Legion: Meeting Last Night; President Arthur Elected to Membership". National Republican. Washington, DC. April 6, 1882 – via Newspapers.com.
- "Leading Officials: The Three Principal Officers in the Nebraska Posts". Omaha Daily Bee. Omaha, NE. August 30, 1891 – via Newspapers.com.
- "In the Encampment at the Reunion at Ashland". Medford Mail. Medford, OR. September 23, 1892 – via Newspapers.com.
- "Meeting of C. A. Arthur Post, No. 411". The Goffs Advocate. Goff, KS. January 26, 1893 – via Newspapers.com.
- "Monuments At Albany" (PDF). The New York Times. January 7, 1894.
- "Sister of Arthur Dead: Mrs. Regina M. Caw Was Born In Dunham, Canada in 1822". The Washington Post. Washington, DC. November 17, 1910. p. 3.
- "Sister of Late President Arthur Dies at Age of 87". Burlington Free Press. Burlington, VT. April 12, 1915. p. 1.
- Jenks, J. E. (March 6, 1915). "Obituary, Major William Arthur". Army and Navy Register. Washington, DC.
- "Mrs. John E. McElroy Dead: Sister of Late President Arthur Succumbs in Atlantic City". Washington Times. Washington, DC. January 9, 1917. p. 9.

=== Other websites ===
- Dolton, Trisha (July 12, 2013). "Another Sister for Chester: Almeda Arthur Masten". Greenwich History. Greenwich, NY: Greenwich Town Historian.
- Bycoffe, Aaron (February 7, 2017). "Pence Has Already Done Something Biden Never Did: Break A Senate Tie". FiveThirtyEight. Archived from the original on February 7, 2017.
- "A Dramatic Tie-Breaker". United States Senate. Archived from the original on December 10, 2020.
- "Supreme Court Nominations, present-1789". United States Senate.
- National GAR Records Program (2005). "Historical Summary of Grand Army of the Republic (GAR) Posts by State: Wisconsin" (PDF). garrecords.org. Sons of Union Veterans of the Civil War. Archived from the original (PDF) on July 27, 2020.
- Rhode Island Commandery (2009). "From the Headquarters Desk". Original Civil War Officer Members of MOLLUS. Military Order of the Loyal Legion of the United States.
- "Chester A. Arthur Fourth Annual Message". The American Presidency Project. December 1, 1884.

Party political offices
Preceded by John Smyth	Chair of the New York Republican Party; 1879–1881	Succeeded by B. Platt Carpenter
Preceded by William A. Wheeler	Republican nominee for Vice President of the United States; 1880	Succeeded by John A. Logan
Political offices
Preceded by William A. Wheeler	Vice President of the United States; 1881	Succeeded by Thomas A. Hendricks
Preceded by James A. Garfield	President of the United States; 1881–1885	Succeeded by Grover Cleveland
