= Grace Bedell =

Correspondent with Abraham Lincoln (1848–1936)

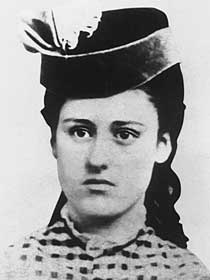
- Bedell in the 1870s
- Born: Grace Greenwood Bedell; November 4, 1848; Albion, New York, U.S.
- Died: November 2, 1936 (aged 87); Delphos, Kansas, U.S.
- Known for: Persuading Abraham Lincoln to grow a beard
- Spouse: George Billings

Grace Greenwood Billings (née Bedell; November 4, 1848 – November 2, 1936) was an American woman, notable as a person whose correspondence, at age 11, encouraged Republican Party nominee and future president Abraham Lincoln to grow a beard. Lincoln later met with Bedell during his inaugural journey in February 1861, sporting his new beard.

== Event ==
Grace Bedell was born on November 4, 1848, in Albion, New York, U.S. Bedell grew up in Westfield, New York. It is possible that her name was inspired by the popular writer and abolitionist Sara Jane Lippincott, better known as "Grace Greenwood."

=== Background ===
On October 15, 1860, a few weeks before Lincoln was elected President of the United States, Grace Bedell sent him a letter from her house at 34 Academy Street in Westfield, New York, urging him to grow a beard to improve his appearance. Lincoln responded in a letter on October 19, 1860, making no promises. However, within a month, he grew a full beard.

In an 1878 interview with a local newspaper of Westfield, Grace Bedell-Billings recalled what prompted her to write the letter: "We were at that time residing at Westfield, N.Y. My father, who was a staunch Republican, brought one day to me – who followed in his footsteps and was a zealous champion of Mr. Lincoln – a picture of 'Lincoln and Hamlin', one of those coarse exaggerated likenesses which it seems the fate of our long-suffering people in such contents. You are familiar with Mr. Lincoln's physiognomy, and remember the high forehead over those sadly pathetic eyes, the angular lower face with the deep cut lines about the mouth. As I regarded the picture, I said to my mother, 'He would look better if he wore whiskers, and I mean to write and tell him so.'"

=== The correspondence ===
Hon A B [sic] Lincoln...

Dear Sir My father has just home from the fair and brought home your picture and Mr. Hamlin's. I am a little girl only 11 years old, but want you should be President of the United States very much so I hope you wont think me very bold to write to such a great man as you are. Have you any little girls about as large as I am if so give them my love and tell her to write to me if you cannot answer this letter. I have yet got four brothers and part of them will vote for you any way and if you let your whiskers grow I will try and get the rest of them to vote for you you would look a great deal better for your face is so thin. All the ladies like whiskers and they would tease their husbands to vote for you and then you would be President. My father is going to vote for you and if I was a man I would vote for you to [sic] but I will try to get every one to vote for you that I can I think that rail fence around your picture makes it look very pretty I have got a little baby sister she is nine weeks old and is just as cunning as can be. When you direct your letter direct to Grace Bedell Westfield Chautauqua County New York. I must not write any more answer this letter right off Good bye

Grace Bedell

Lincoln made no promises in his reply to Bedell's letter:

Springfield, Ill Oct 19, 1860

Miss Grace Bedell My dear little Miss Your very agreeable letter of the 15th is received. I regret the necessity of saying I have no daughters. I have three sons – one seventeen, one nine, and one seven, years of age. They, with their mother, constitute my whole family. As to the whiskers, having never worn any, do you not think people would call it a silly affectation if I were to begin it now? Your very sincere well wisher

A. Lincoln

== Lincoln visits Bedell ==
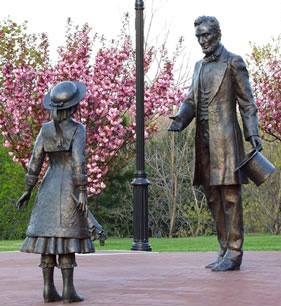
Lincoln Bedell statue, Westfield, New York

Shortly after this exchange, Lincoln allowed his beard to grow. The next time he visited his barber William Florville, he announced "Billy, let's give them a chance to grow."

By the time Lincoln began his inaugural journey from Illinois to Washington, D.C. by train, he had a full beard. The trip took Lincoln through New York state, and included a stop in Bedell's hometown of Westfield, New York, where thousands gathered to meet the president-elect. Once there, Lincoln asked to meet Grace Bedell by name.

The February 19, 1861, edition of the New York World recounted the meeting as follows: "At Westfield an interesting incident occurred. Shortly after his nomination Mr. Lincoln had received from that place a letter from a little girl, who urged him, as a means of improving his personal appearance, to wear whiskers. Mr. Lincoln at the time replied, stating that although he was obliged by the suggestion, he feared his habits of life were too fixed to admit of even so slight a change as that which letting his beard grow involved. To-day, on reaching the place, he related the incident, and said that if that young lady was in the crowd he should be glad to see her. There was a momentary commotion, in the midst of which an old man, struggling through the crowd, approached, leading his daughter, a girl of apparently twelve or thirteen years of age, whom he introduced to Mr. Lincoln as his Westfield correspondent. Mr. Lincoln stooped down and kissed the child, and talked with her for some minutes. Her advice had not been thrown away upon the rugged chieftain. A beard of several months' growth covers (perhaps adorns) the lower part of his face. The young girl's peachy cheek must have been tickled with a stiff whisker, for the growth of which she was herself responsible."

Bedell recalled the event years later: "He climbed down and sat down with me on the edge of the station platform," she recalled. "'Gracie,' he said, 'look at my whiskers. I have been growing them for you.' Then he kissed me. I never saw him again."

== Contemporaneous Lincoln photos ==
Timeline
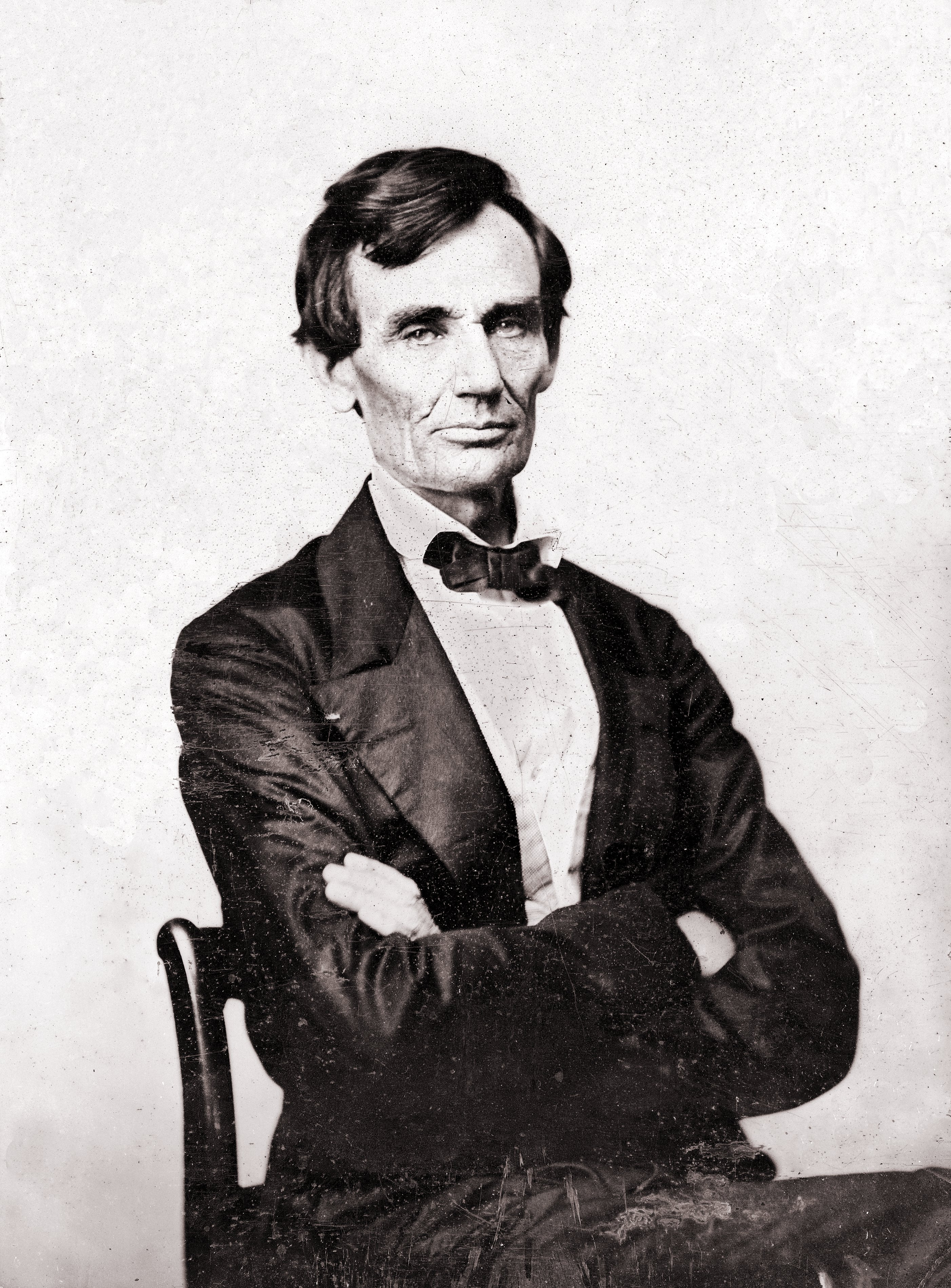
August 13, 1860
The last beardless photo of Lincoln.

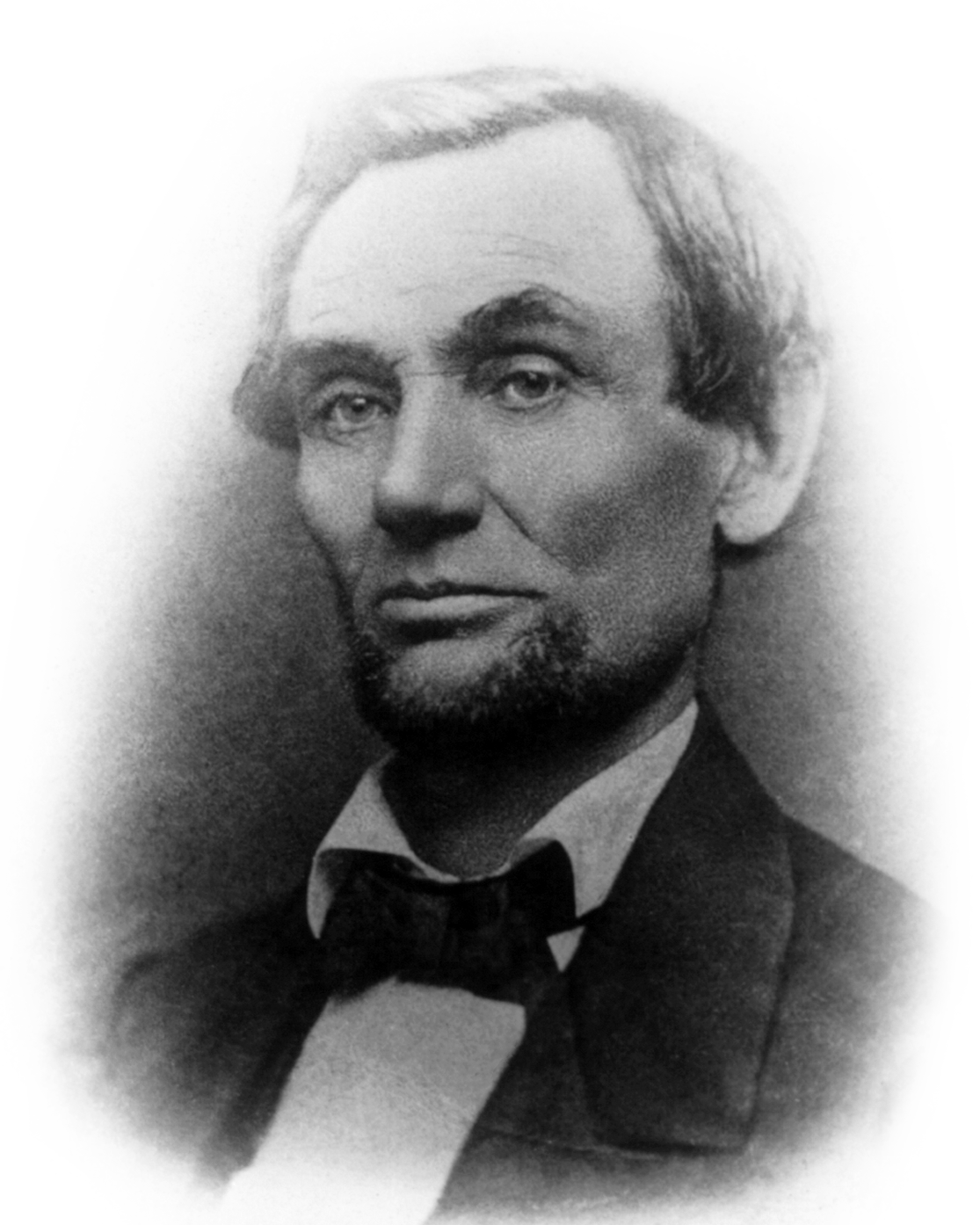
November 25, 1860
One month after Bedell's letter.

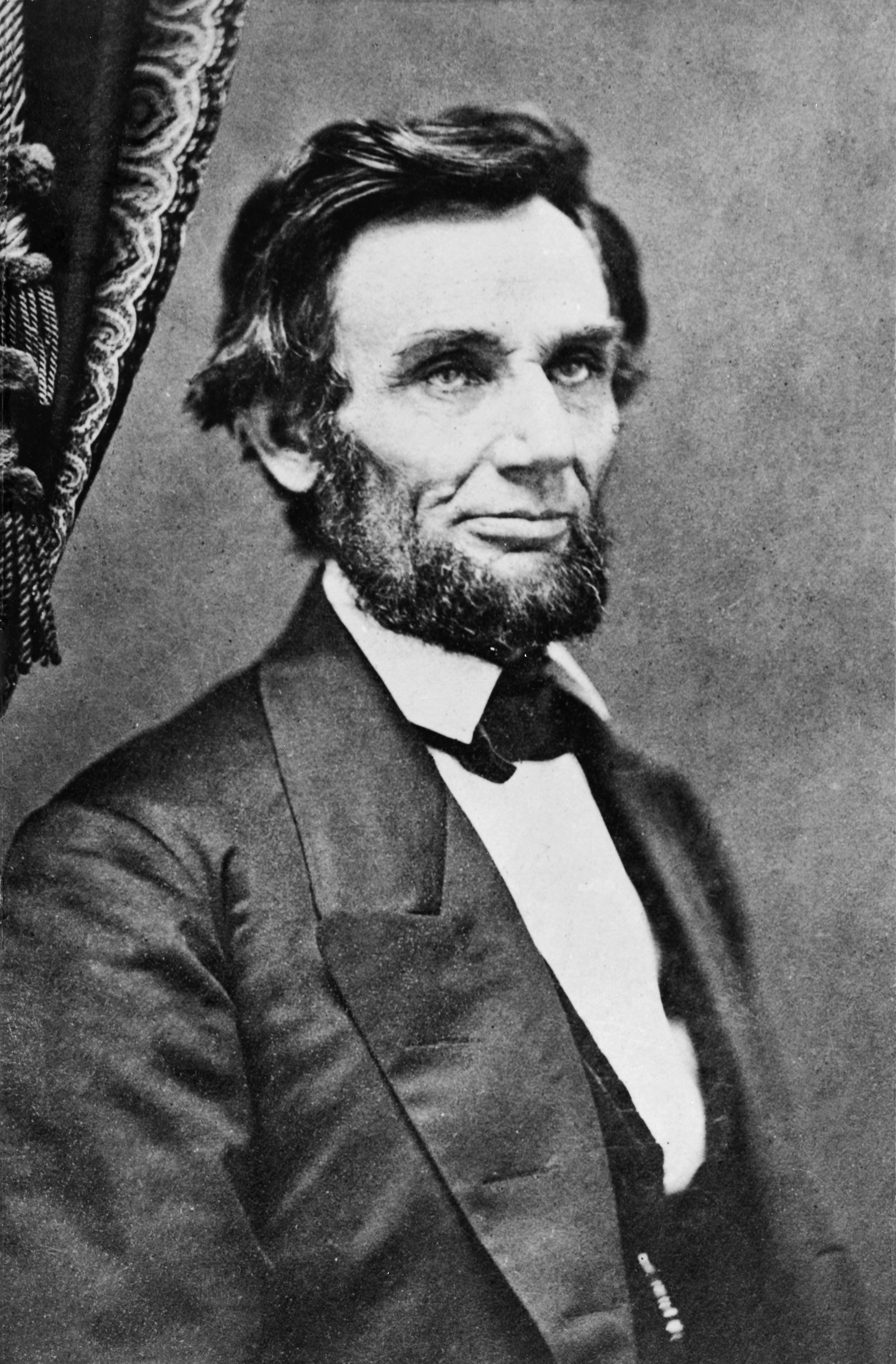
February 9, 1861
Ten days before visiting Bedell en route to his inauguration.

== Second letter ==
Bedell wrote a second letter to Lincoln in 1864 when she was 15. She asked for Lincoln's help gaining a job with the Treasury so that she could financially support her parents. This letter was discovered by a researcher in 2007:

Pres Lincoln,

After a great deal of forethought on the subject I have concluded to address you, asking your aid in obtaining a situation, Do you remember before your election receiving a letter from a little girl residing at Westfield in Chautauque Co. advising the wearing of whiskers as an improvement to your face. I am that little girl grown to the size of a woman. I believe in your answer to that letter you signed yourself. "Your true friend and well-wisher." will you not show yourself my friend now. My Father during the last few years lost nearly all his property, and although we have never known want, I feel that I ought and could do something for myself. If I only knew what that "something" was. I have heard that a large number of girls are employed constantly and with good wages at Washington cutting Treasury notes and other things pertaining to that Department. Could I not obtain a situation ther? [sic] I know I could if you would exert your unbounded influences a word from you would secure me a good paying situation which would at least enable me to support myself if not to help my parents, this, at present – is my highest ambition. My parents are ignorant of this application to you for assistance. If you require proof of my family's respectability. I can name persons here whose names may not be unknown to you. We have always resided here excepting the two years we were at Westfield. I have addressed one letter to you before, pertaining to this subject, but receiving no answer I chose rather to think you had failed to recieve [sic] it, not believing that your natural kindness of heart of which I have heard so much would prompt you to pass it by unanswered. Direct to this place.

Grace G. Bedell

== Later life and death ==
Bedell later married Union Army veteran George Billings. They eventually moved to Delphos, in Ottawa County, Kansas, in 1870 and had a son, Harlow Drake Billings, who was born on September 16, 1872. Bedell died of natural causes on November 2, 1936, two days before her 88th birthday, and 1 day before the 1936 presidential election. Bedell was buried at Delphos Cemetery.

== Legacy ==
The anecdote became a popular children's story following Lincoln's assassination. A statue depicting a meeting between Lincoln and Bedell is located in the center of the village of Westfield, at the intersection of US 20 and NY 394.

The Great Man's Whiskers, a 1972 American made-for-television drama film, features this story about Abraham Lincoln with Cindy Eilbacher as the young correspondent and Dennis Weaver as Lincoln.

Mr. Lincoln's Whiskers, written and illustrated by Karen B. Winnick (1996), tells the story of how 11-year-old Grace Bedell wrote to Mr. Lincoln to "let (his) whiskers grow". The picture book includes the complete letters of both Grace and Lincoln.

To mark the 150th anniversary of the events surrounding the letter, Mark Esslinger and Eric Burdett produced a short film, Grace Bedell (2010), starring Lana Esslinger as Grace Bedell.

== See also ==
- Julia Sand, a similar presidential correspondent
