= Thomas C. Reeves =

U.S historian (born 1936)

Thomas Charles Reeves (born 1936) is a U.S historian who specializes in late 19th and 20th century America.

Born into a blue collar family in Tacoma, Washington, Reeves received his B.A. at Pacific Lutheran University, his M.A. at the University of Washington, and his Ph.D. in history at the University of California, Santa Barbara in 1966. After four years at the University of Colorado-Colorado Springs, he went on to become a professor of history at the University of Wisconsin–Parkside.

Reeves has received research and teaching grants from the American Philosophical Society, the Eleanor Roosevelt Institute, the National Endowment for the Humanities, the Bradley Foundation, and the Randolph Foundation, among others. He has published some 60 articles in scholarly journals and more than 100 book reviews in numerous journals, magazines, and newspapers. From 2004 to 2008 he wrote a twice-weekly column for the History News Network. In 2009 and 2010 he wrote several articles for the Catholic website MercatorNet.

In 1988, Reeves was a co-founder of the Wisconsin Association of Scholars and for several years thereafter was on the board of the National Association of Scholars. In 2008 he served as Chairman of the John Gilmary Shea Prize committee of the American Catholic Historical Association. He has long served on the Board of Advisers of the Catholic League For Religious and Civil Rights and is a member of the Fellowship of Catholic Scholars. From 1992 to 2007, Reeves was a Senior Fellow at the Wisconsin Policy Research Institute.

Reeves' appearances in the media include three national book tours, two programs in the Public Broadcasting System's presidential series, and two Firing Line programs. He has been an adviser on three films about U.S. Senator Joseph McCarthy.

A Catholic, Reeves retired in 2001 and lives with his wife of more than 68 years in the Town of Yorkville, in Racine County, Wisconsin.

== Books ==
- Freedom and the Foundation: The Fund for the Republic in the Era of McCarthyism (Knopf, 1969)
- (ed.), Foundations Under Fire (Cornell, 1970)
- (ed.), McCarthyism (Dryden, 1973)
- Gentleman Boss: The Life of Chester Alan Arthur (Knopf, 1975, 1991) ISBN 9780945707035
- (ed.), James De Koven, Anglican Saint (Community of Saint Mary, 1978)
- The Life and Times of Joe McCarthy: A Biography (Stein and Day, 1982) (Madison Books, 1997) ISBN 9781568331010
- (ed.), John F. Kennedy: The Man, the Politician, the President (Krieger, 1990) ISBN 9780894643712
- A Question of Character: A Life of John F. Kennedy (Free Press, 1991) (Three Rivers Press, 1997) ISBN 9780761512875
- (ed.), James Lloyd Breck: Apostle of the Wilderness (Nashotah House/Frontier Missionary Press, 1992) ISBN 9781881648017
- The Empty Church: The Suicide of Liberal Christianity (Free Press, 1996) ISBN 9780684828114
- Twentieth Century America: A Brief History (Oxford, 2000) ISBN 9780195044843
- America's Bishop: The Life and Times of Fulton J. Sheen (Encounter, 2001) ISBN 9781893554610
- Distinguished Service: The Life of Wisconsin Governor Walter J. Kohler, Jr. (Marquette, 2006) ISBN 9780874620177
