= Chester Alan Arthur II =

American sportsman and art connoisseur (1864–1937)

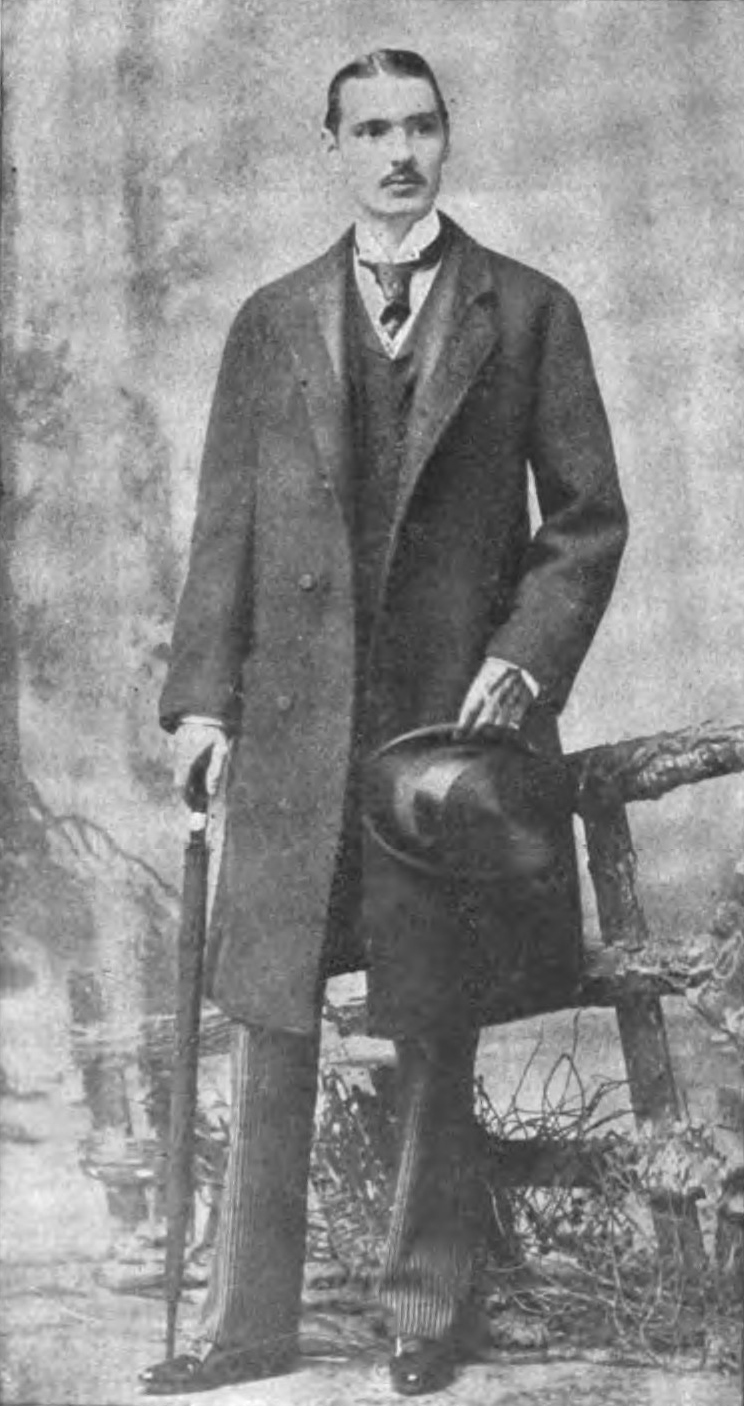
- Arthur c. 1897
- Born: July 25, 1864; New York City, U.S.
- Died: July 18, 1937 (aged 72); Colorado Springs, Colorado, U.S.
- Education: College of New Jersey (1885)
- Occupations: Sportsman; art connoisseur
- Spouses: Myra Townsend Fithian Andrews (m. 1900; div. 1927); Rowena Dashwood Graves (m. 1934)
- Children: Gavin Arthur
- Parents: Chester A. Arthur (father); Ellen Lewis Herndon (mother)

Chester Alan Arthur II (July 25, 1864 – July 18, 1937), also known as Alan Arthur, was an American sportsman and art connoisseur. He was the son of Chester A. Arthur, president of the United States from 1881 to 1885. He studied at Princeton University and Columbia Law School. After completing his studies, Arthur traveled throughout Europe for 10 years. In 1900, he married in Switzerland and moved to Colorado Springs, Colorado to improve his health.

== Early life ==
Arthur's parents

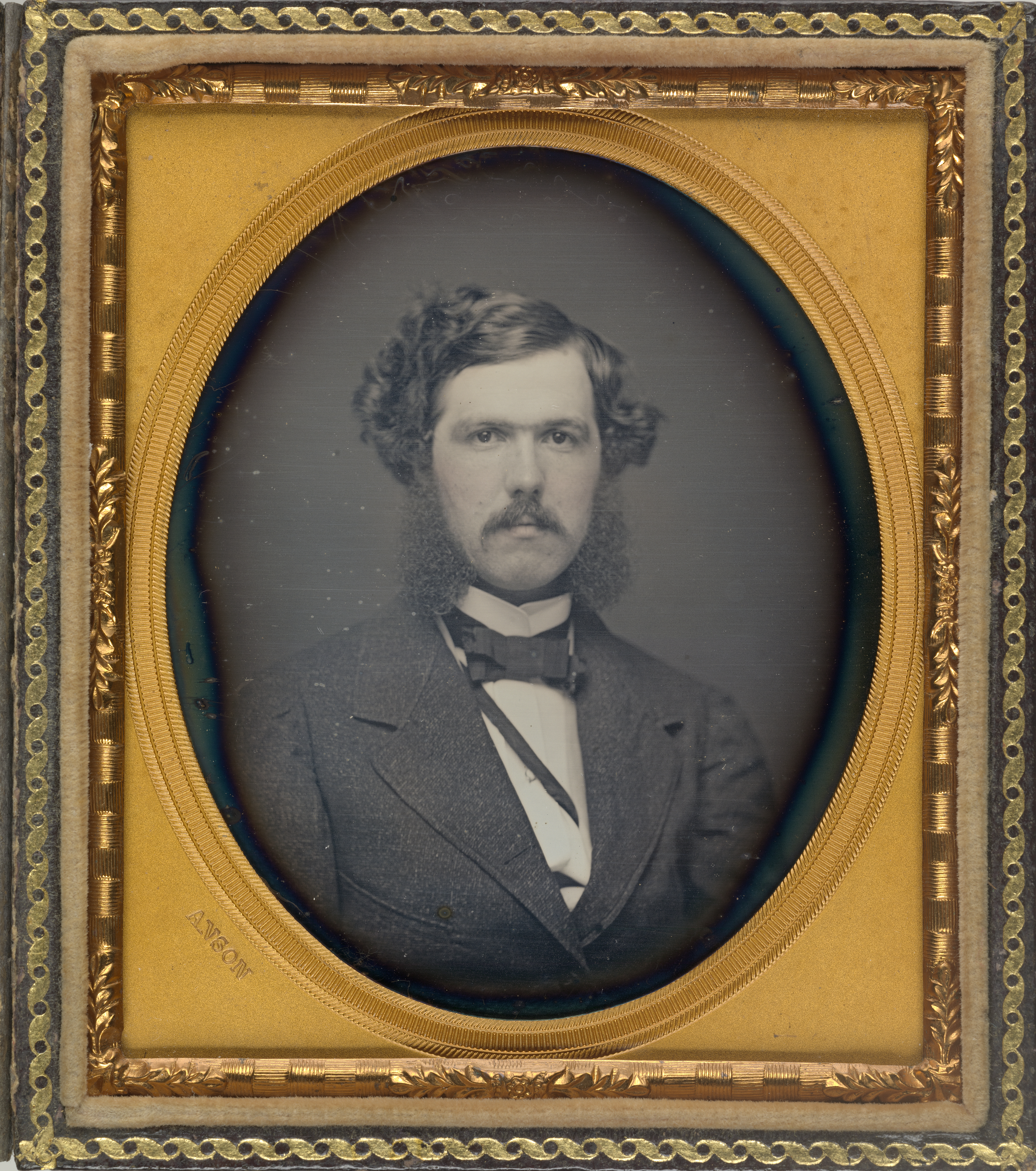
Arthur's father (1829 – 1886), photograph taken 1859

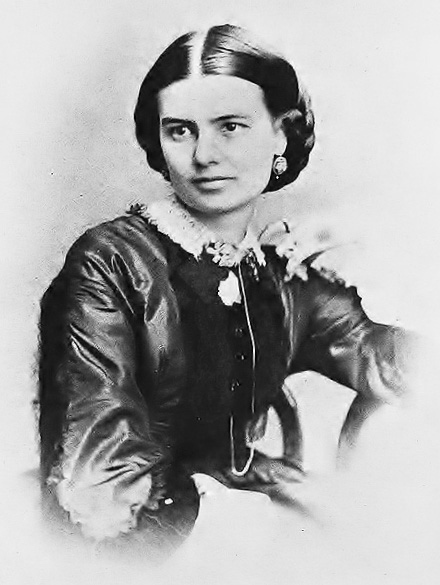
Arthur's mother (1837–1880), photograph taken between 1857 and 1870

Chester Alan Arthur II was the second son of Ellen Lewis Herndon and Chester A. Arthur. Ellen was the daughter of explorer William Lewis Herndon. He was born on July 25, 1864 in New York City. His elder brother, William Lewis Herndon Arthur, was born in December 1860, named after Ellen's father, and died in July 1863 from convulsions or swelling of the brain. It was particularly difficult for Ellen; as her husband wrote, "Nell is broken hearted. I fear for her health." Feeling as if they had "taxed" William's brain with "intellectual demands", they pampered their second son, who "led a life that closely resembled that of European royalty." He wore nice clothes, learned to sail and ride, and was taught charm and vanity. His parents had somewhat of a laissez-faire attitude about his academics.

He had a younger sister, Ellen Herndon "Nell" Arthur, who was born in 1871. (Note: Nell married Charles Pinkerton. She led a private life and died in 1915.)

The family had a home at 123 Lexington Avenue in Kips Bay, Manhattan. There, Ellen held musical recitals, dinners and other parties at home to support her husband's professional and political ambitions. Chester had offices at Fifth Avenue Hotel, which was then the "epicenter of New York Republican politics. Although it was near his family's home, he used the hotel as a second home. He also spent many evenings away from the family at Delmonico's. From March through April 1878, Arthur traveled with his mother and sister to Europe.

His parents' marriage was not particularly happy; Ellen Arthur had difficulty managing her husband's "late hours and high living". His mother died in 1880 of pneumonia, before her husband was elected vice president. Regarding his father's reaction to his wife's death, "It was said that something graver, softer, kindlier, was observable in the character of her husband, aft the falling of that heavy blow."

It was said of his father's attentiveness to his children, "although Arthur loved to showcase his two children" at New York and "White House social affairs, he much preferred fishing, feasting with his cronies, and administrative work to family life." His relationship with his children was considered "somewhat strained and aloof".

Author Annette Atkins theorizes that Chester Alan Arthur II may have developed a "rosebud gathering", or live for the moment attitude about life due to his mother's early death at the age of 42. Another contributing factor may have been the zealousness of his father's ambitions that kept him away from his family, which was very difficult for his mother, and presumably the children.

== Arthur presidency and education ==
USS Despatch

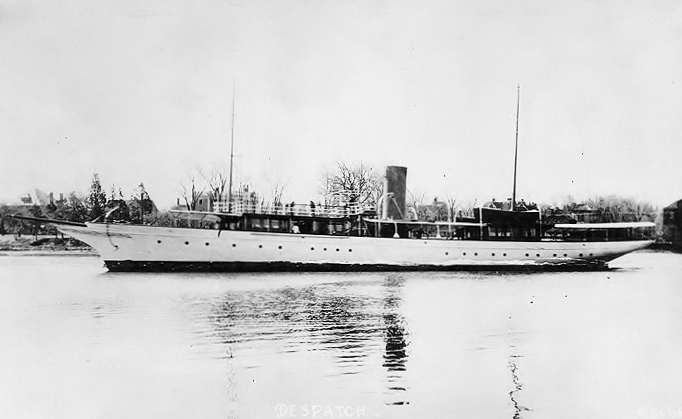
The presidential yacht during Chester A. Arthur's presidency that his son enjoyed.

President Arthur did not spend much time with his children, but he liked to "showcase his children" during lavish parties he held in Washington. Ellen did not particularly enjoy the attention, but Chester Arthur II "took to the social life" and enjoyed a life of leisure over one of professional ambition. (Note: Ellen came to live at the White House and was looked after by President Arthur's sister, Mary McElroy. McElroy was also hostess at White House events.) He was called "the Prince of Washington" for the way he made the most of being the son of the President, such as attending receptions and using the presidential yacht. While at Princeton University (then known as the College of New Jersey) during his father's presidency Arthur would take the train to Washington, D.C., and party "into the wee hours". During his White House visits, he would play the piano and the banjo. He graduated from Princeton in 1885. He studied law at Columbia Law School, in the hope of taking over his father's law firm in New York City but withdrew before he completed his studies.

Arthur was at his father's side at the family's 123 Lexington Avenue house when the former President died in 1886. Shortly before his father's death, Arthur burned his father's official papers that filled 3 garbage cans; He was dubbed the "presidential papers destroyer". Someone intervened to prevent the destruction of all of the papers.

Arthur and his sister remained close until her death in 1915. He had once expressed concern that when Ellen married, he would have lost all connections with any family. When Ellen became engaged, she told her brother that he was not losing her and that getting married hadn't altered the extent to which she loved him. When Myra became pregnant, Arthur told his sister first before anyone else.

== Post-presidency ==
=== Europe ===
After graduation, in 1887, he sailed to Europe and stayed there for nearly 13 years. He was able to travel to every major European city and "enjoy a gentleman's life" due to his inheritance from his father. He was part of Albert Edward, the Prince of Wales's, circle of friends. His son described him as "the perfect pattern of an Edwardian gentleman and of a Europeanized American." He was described as "tall, handsome, and athletic."

While in Europe he enjoyed the company of "female admirers", the cuisine, and horses, particularly "driving horse-drawn carriages throughout the French countryside." By this time, he preferred to be called Alan. He campaigned for the position of Ambassador to the Netherlands in 1897, but was unsuccessful.

He returned to the United States in 1900 and had a home in Colorado Springs, Colorado, and also had a residence in Europe.

=== Colorado Springs ===
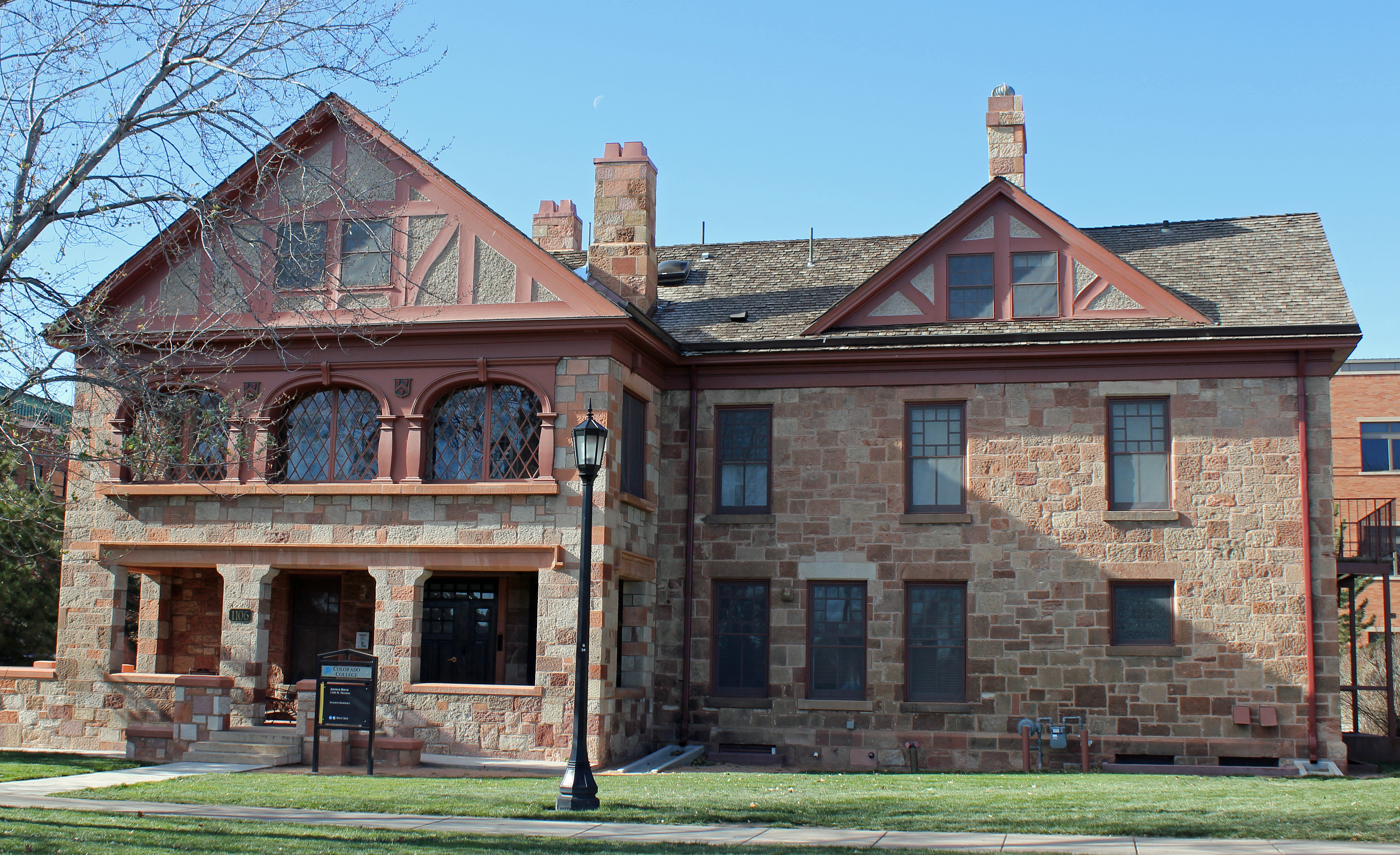
Chester Alan and Myra Arthur's home, Edgeplain in Colorado Springs, Colorado.

In October 1900, Arthur and his bride went to Colorado for his health; he had asthma and bronchitis. The couple's son, Chester Alan Arthur III, was born March 21, 1901. Myra gave birth to a daughter, named Ellen for Arthur's mother and sister, but she did not survive.

They lived on income from investments, including Arthur's interest in the 250,000-acre cattle ranch, Trinchera Estate. In addition to raising cattle, the company mined gold, cut timber, and created a game park reserve for antelope, elk, and bison.

Arthur's health improved in the Colorado climate. He was president of Cheyenne Mountain Country Club between 1905 and 1908. He also provided funding for facilities at the club. Polo became a favored sport as the result of top polo players to the area. When Vice President Theodore Roosevelt visited Colorado Springs in 1901, he had dinner at the Arthurs' home, Edgeplain, and attended a polo match.

Arthur and Spencer Penrose built a Cheyenne Mountain clubhouse, based upon the "gourmet, culinary" Rabbit Club in Philadelphia in 1914.

== Personal life ==
He married wealthy divorcée Myra Townsend Fithian Andrews on May 10, 1900, at the English American Episcopal Church and at a civil ceremony in Vevey, Switzerland. The couple divorced in 1927. During the couple's marriage, Arthur had been a womanizer who enjoyed drinking and partying. Myra realized her husband had been having an affair in 1909, said that she would grant him his freedom but would fight to keep their son. The couple reconciled, but had a rocky marriage until they divorced.

Arthur married Rowena Dashwood Graves in 1934. She was 39 and he was 70 years of age when they married.

Arthur was a member of New York's Member Union, Knickerbocker, Brook and Racquet and Tennis Clubs. In Paris, he was a member of the Travelers' Club. He was a member of the Denver Club, El Paso Club and Colorado Springs Country Club.

== Death and legacy ==
Arthur died on July 18, 1937, at the age of 72 in Colorado Springs. He was the last surviving child of Chester A. Arthur. An obituary in the Miami Times said that Arthur was an "internationally known sportsman, art connoisseur and son of the late President Chester Arthur." Rowena died in 1969.

He never lived the life his father had envisioned for him as an attorney. He may never have held a job. Instead his interests were polo, art and social gatherings. Among his friends were artists James McNeill Whistler and John Singer Sargent. He "thoroughly enjoyed a lifetime romp with wine, women and song." Arthur's carriage is one of the exhibits at the Carriage Museum at The Broadmoor resort.

His son Chester "Gavin" Alan Arthur III married Esther Knesborough as his second wife, formerly the wife of John Strachey and daughter of Patrick Francis Murphy.
