= Esther Murphy Strachey =

American historian (1897–1962)

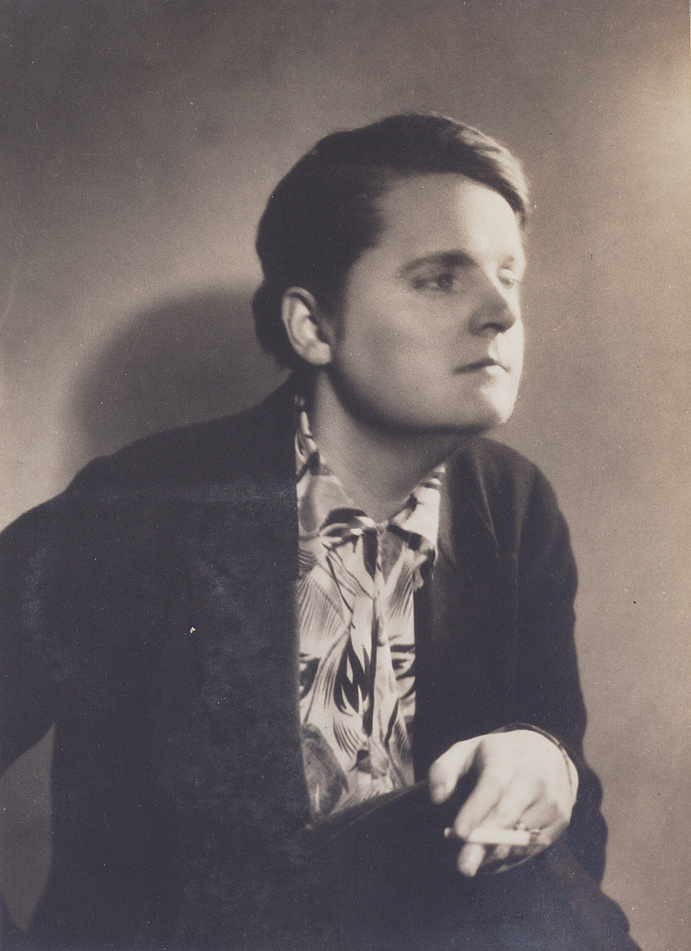
- Esther Murphy Arthur, 1920
- Born: October 22, 1897
- Died: November 23, 1962 (aged 65)
- Spouses: John Strachey (m. 1929); Gavin Arthur (m. 1935; div. 1961)
- Relatives: Gerald Clery Murphy (brother); Frederic Timothy Murphy (brother)

Esther Strachey (née Murphy, later Arthur; October 22, 1897 – November 23, 1962) was an American academic, historian, and socialite.

== Early life and education ==
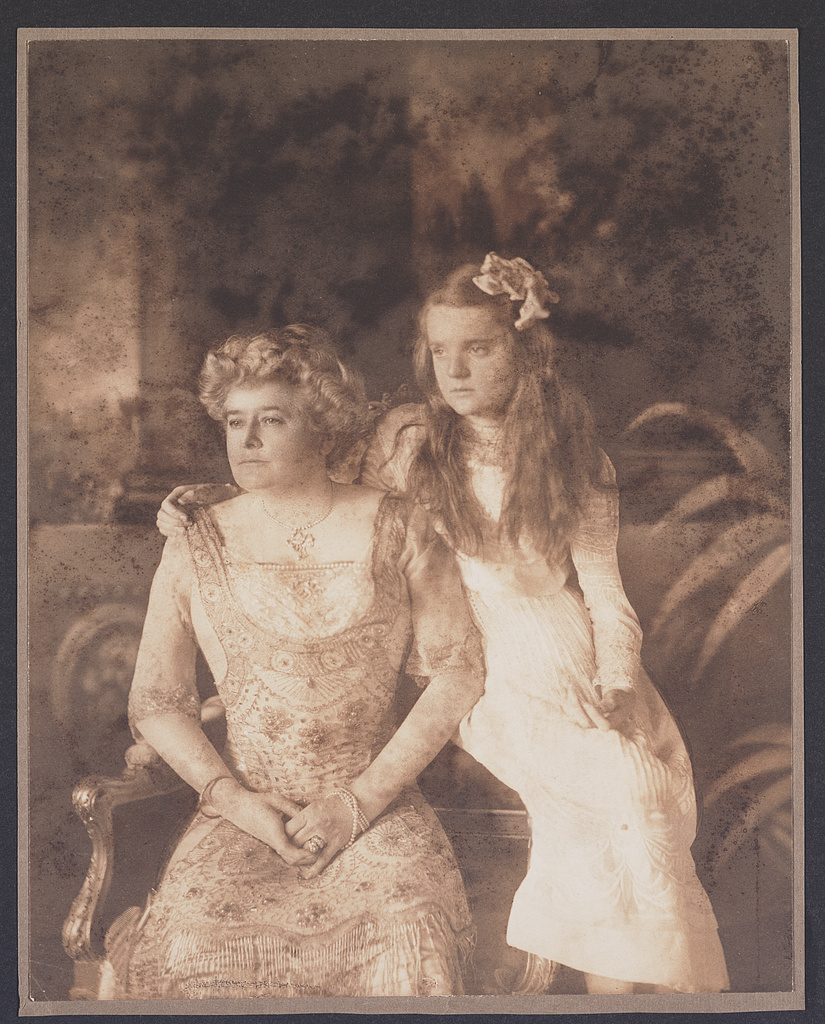
Esther Murphy Arthur as a girl with her mother, Mrs. Patrick Francis Murphy, née Anna Ryan, between 1910 and 1915

Murphy was born on October 22, 1897, the daughter of Patrick Francis Murphy (1858–1931), owner of the Mark Cross Company, sellers of fine leather goods, and Anna Elizabeth Ryan (c. 1858–1932). She had two siblings: Gerald Clery Murphy (1888–1964) and Frederic Timothy Murphy (1884–1924).

Unable due to her mother's health to attend Bryn Mawr College, Murphy followed the Harvard University curriculum at home.

== Career ==
She frequented a circle of American expatriates living in the French Riviera in the 1920s. A 1926 letter written from France by F. Scott Fitzgerald noted, "Nobody was in Antibes that summer... except me, Zelda, the Valentinos, the Murphys, Mistinguett, Rex Ingram, Dos Passos, Alice Terry, the MacLeishes, Charlie Brackett, Maud Kahn (daughter of philanthropist Otto Kahn; wife of Major-General Sir John Marriott), Esther Murphy (sister of Gerald; wife of John Strachey), Marguerite Namara, E. Oppenheimer (sic), Mannes the violinist, Floyd Dell, Max and Crystal Eastman, ex-premier Orlando, Etienne de Beaumont..."

When in Paris, she frequented Janet Flanner (who would later become a lover of her sister-in-law, Noël Haskins Murphy) and Solita Solano, Gertrude Stein and Alice B. Toklas, Dolly Wilde and Natalie Clifford Barney (who was Murphy's passionate obsession).

In 1928 Djuna Barnes wrote a satirical group biography of Natalie Clifford Barney's Parisian circle, the Ladies Almanack (1928), in which Murphy's caricature is "Bounding Bess." Murphy in turn wrote a fantasia that metamorphoses Barney into a 13th-century abbess also known for "amazing activities during the Crusades." Indeed, in a story recounted by Murphy, Isabel Pell, with Barney, really infiltrated a 13th-century Italian convent to meet with Alice Robinson, one of Barney's affairs. Murphy was also friends with Mercedes de Acosta, Madge Garland, Edmund Wilson and Dorothy Parker. Another friend, novelist Dawn Powell wrote about what she perceived as Murphy's failure of a life: "Some people don't want to be the action – they really want to be spectator."

She published essays and books, was a public speaker, and was a regular panelist along with Eleanor Roosevelt, Margaret Mead, and Fanny Hurst on the ABC radio program Listen – The Women!.

== Personal life ==
On April 29, 1929, Murphy married John Strachey, British Labour politician and writer. Oswald Mosley was the best man at the wedding.

In 1935, Murphy married Gavin Arthur, a San Francisco astrologer and sexologist and a grandson of U.S. President Chester A. Arthur. He was also an early gay rights activist and a practical prototype for the hippies. They divorced in 1961.

In 1945, she met writer Sybille Bedford, who would become her lover; the relationship lasted only a few years, but they remained lifelong friends.

== Death ==
Murphy died on November 23, 1962, in Paris. Her ashes were returned to the United States on December 5, 1962, to her brother, Gerald Murphy.

== Gallery ==
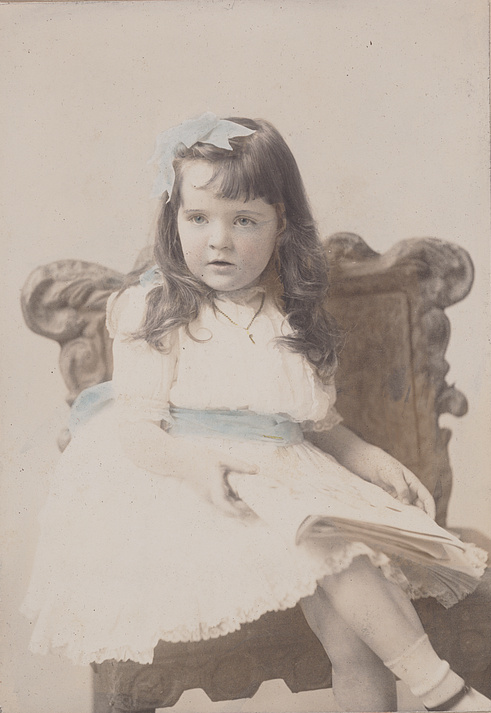
Esther Murphy as a young girl, by George Gardner Rockwood (1832-1911), between 1907 and 1910

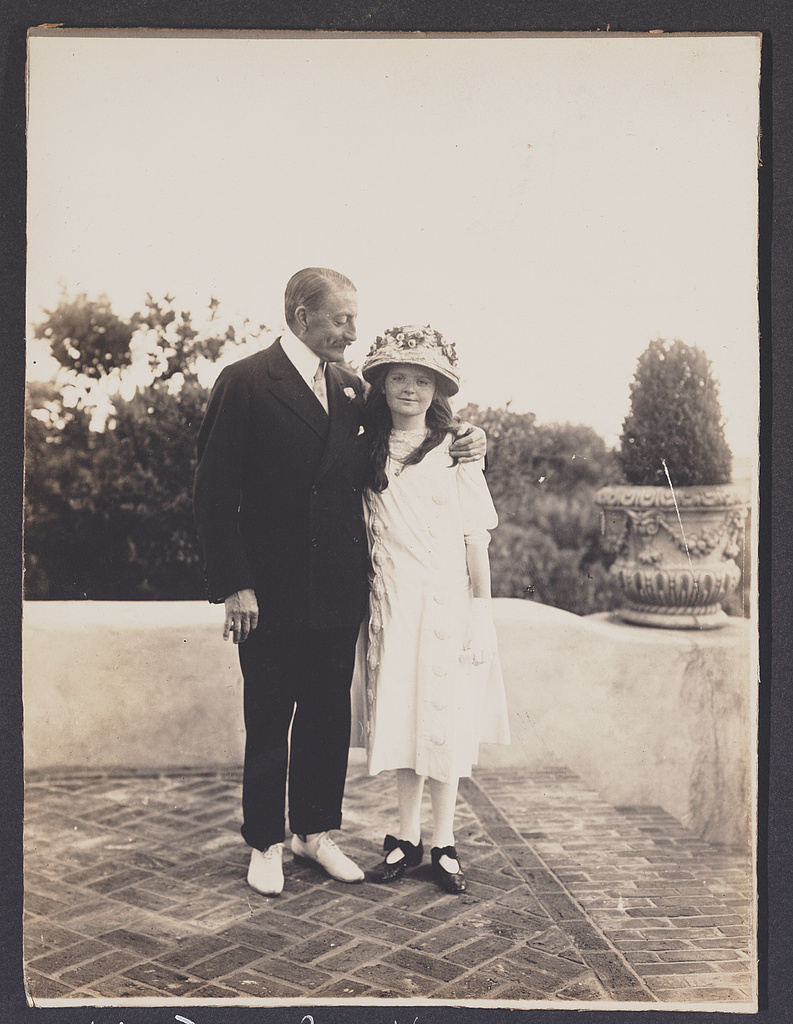
Esther Murphy Arthur as a girl with actor John Drew Jr., between 1910 and 1915

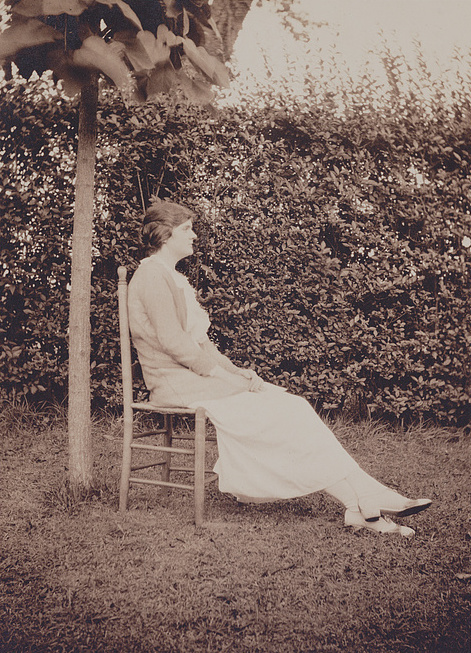
Esther Murphy Arthur sitting outside on a chair, 1923

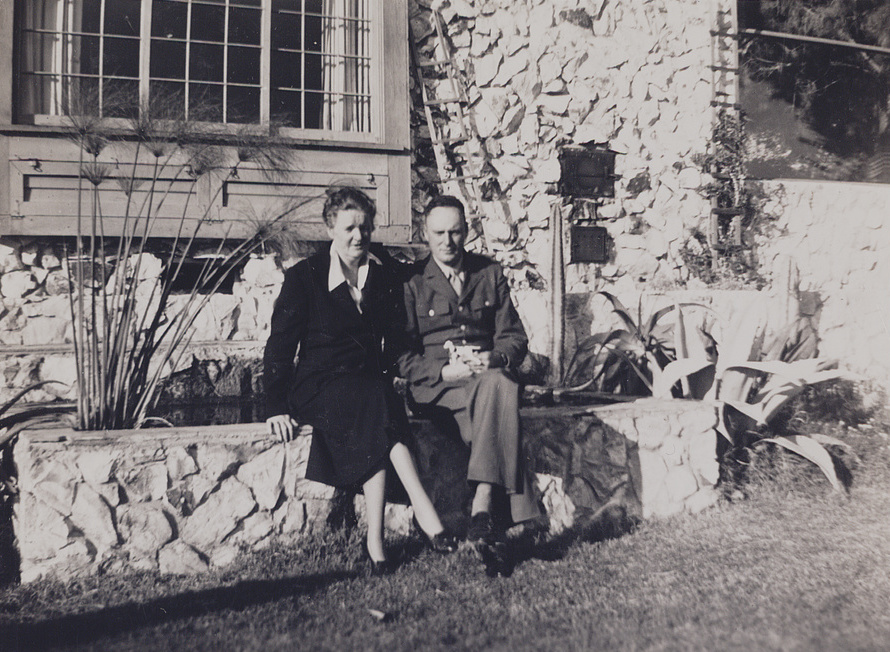
Chester Arthur III (Gavin Arthur), in uniform, and Esther Arthur sitting on a rock wall, 1942

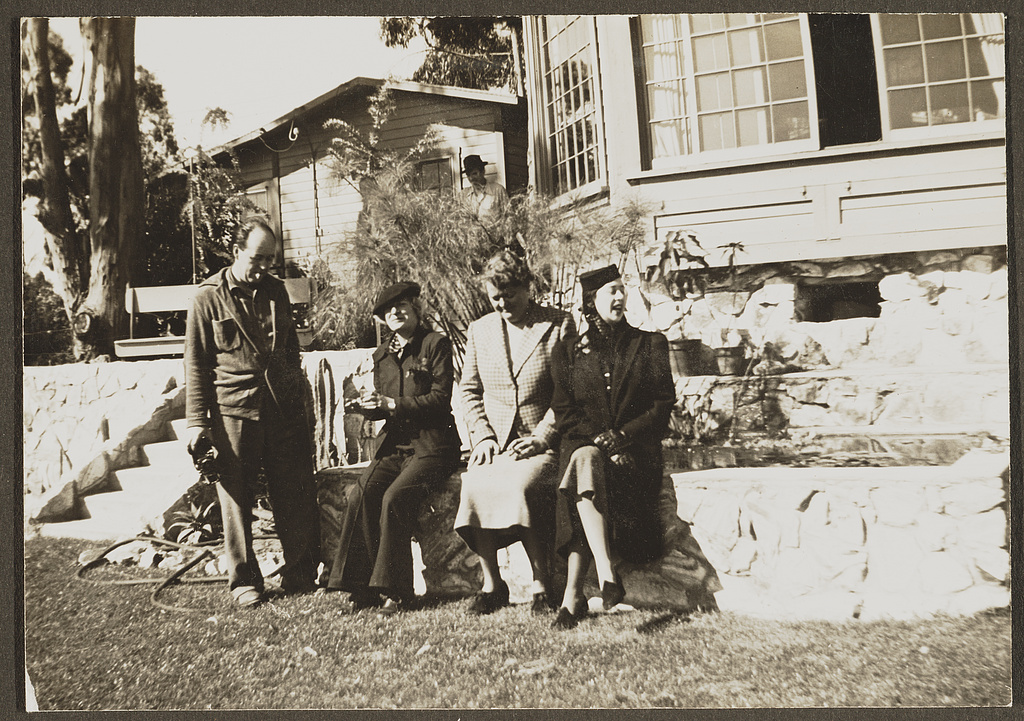
Gavin Arthur, standing, and Janet Flanner, Esther Murphy, and Solita Solano sitting on a rock wall, between 1945 and 1955

== Legacy ==
Lisa Cohen, All We Know: Three Lives (Farrar, Straus and Giroux; First Edition (July 17, 2012)) is the biography of three women: Esther Murphy, detailing early Murphy life and the Mark Cross family business; writer-feminist Mercedes de Acosta; and British Vogue fashion editor Madge Garland. Cohen was intrigued by their invisibility: "if she is remembered at all today, it is as Gerald Murphy's eccentric, pathetic sister, a marvel who became a spectacular disappointment."
