= Patrick Francis Murphy =

American politician

P.F. Murphy
- Murphy c. 1900

Member of the Massachusetts House of Representatives
- In office 1887–1889

Personal details
- Born: Patrick Francis Murphy; 1858 Boston, Massachusetts, U.S.
- Died: 1931 (aged 72–73) New York City, U.S.
- Spouse: Anna Elizabeth Ryan (m. 1883)
- Children: Six, including Gerald and Frederic
- Education: Boston Latin School
- Occupation: Businessman; politician

Patrick Francis Murphy colloquially P.F. Murphy (circa 1858 - November 24, 1931) was an American businessman, dinner speaker and politician who served on the Massachusetts House of Representatives from 1887 to 1889 for the Democratic Party before relocating to New York City in 1892. He was the proprietor of the Mark Cross Company.

== Early life and education ==
Murphy was born 1858 in Boston, Massachusetts, the fourth of fourteen children, to Timothy J. Murphy (1826–1916) and Joanna "Honora" Murphy (née Butler), into an Irish-American family. Both his parents were born in Ireland.

He attended and graduated from Boston Latin School.

== Career ==
In approximately 1876, aged 18, upon graduation from Boston Latin School, he entered the firm of Mark Cross, then a prosperous and steadily growing business founded in 1845, at 118–120 Sudbury Street. He started in the position of bookkeeper and soon became a salesman, making suggestions to the Cross family how the business could be expanded. It turned out that every decision he made created a significant upturn in revenue.

In the 1870s, Murphy was sent to England to educate himself in the art of leather craft and negotiate the exclusive American distribution rights for the prestigious British leather producer the London Harness Agency. Later he would setup a manufacturing facility for Cross in Walsall, West Midlands, England. In 1875, upon the death of Mark W. Cross, Murphy ultimately acquired the business for $6,000 (approximately $180,000 in modern equivalency) which he lent from his father.

In 1892, Murphy moved the business to New York City, where he opened the new flagship of the newly named Mark Cross Company on Broadway and Murray Street in Lower Manhattan.

== Personal life ==
In 1883, Murphy married Anna Elizabeth Ryan (born 1856), a daughter of John J. Ryan (1829–1875) and Angelina Bridget Ryan (née Cleary; 1835–1902), originally from Danesfort, County Kilkenny. They had five children;

- Frederic Timothy Murphy (1884–1924), married Noël Haskins (1896–1982), without issue.
- Patrick Murphy (1887–1887), died in childbed.
- Gerald Clery Murphy (1888–1964), married Sara Sherman Wiborg (1883–1975), three children.
- Dorothea Murphy (1892–1892), died in childbed.
- Esther Murphy (1897–1962), married firstly John Strachey, married secondly Chester Alan "Gavin" Arthur III, a grandson of Chester Alan Arthur, without issue.

Murphy died November 24, 1931 aged 72 at his residence at Sutton Place, Manhattan. In December of 1933 his estate was appraised at $142,844 gross (approximately $3,700,000 in modern equivalency), which was mostly stock in Mark Cross. His net worth was greatly impacted by the 1929 stock market crash as well as the Great Depression.

== Literature ==
- Calvin Tomkins. Living Well Is the Best Revenge. The New Yorker, July 20, 1962
