= Marguerite Namara =

American lyric soprano (1888–1974)

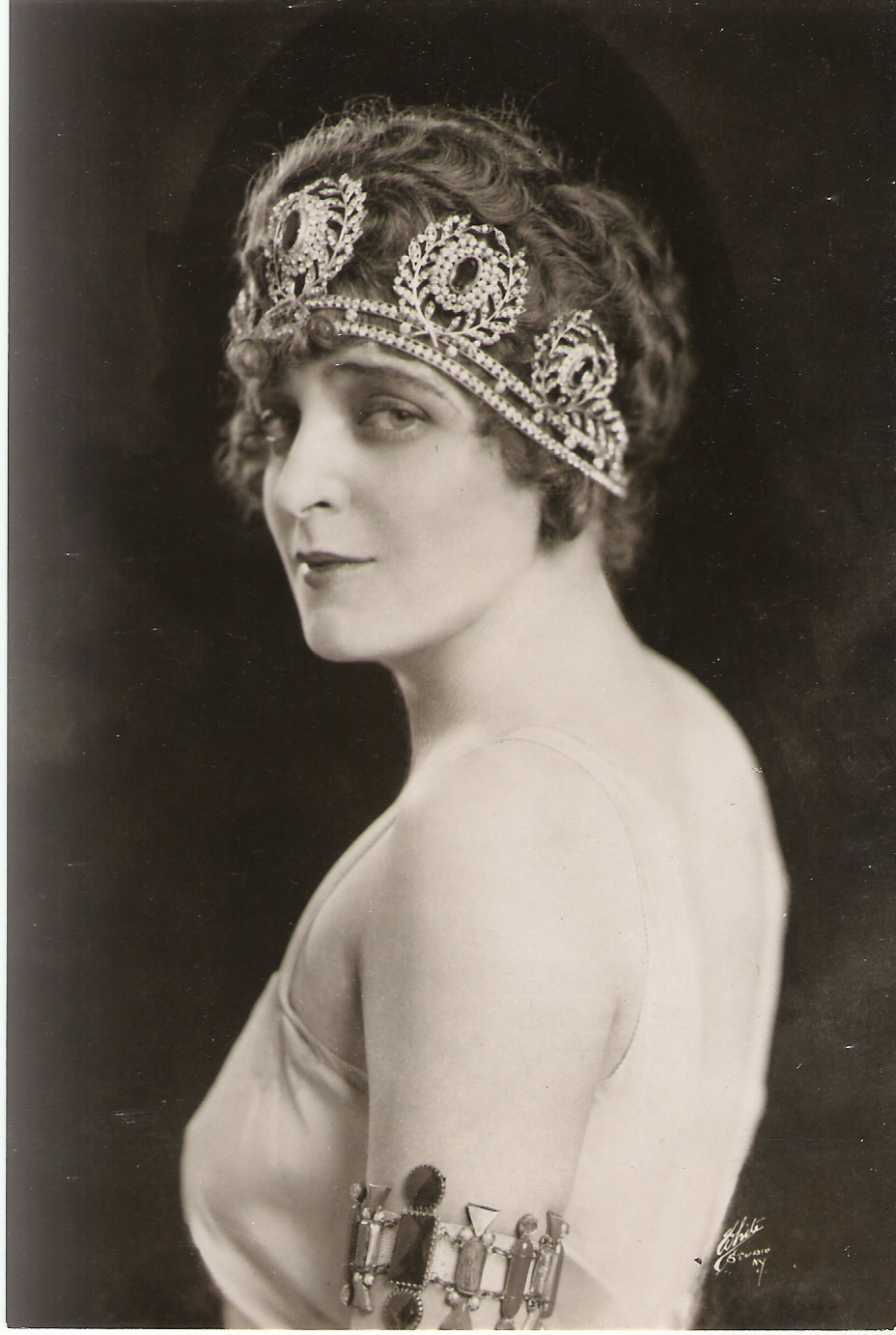
- Namara in Thaïs (1919)

Background information
- Born: Marguerite Evelyn Cecilia Banks; November 19, 1888; Cleveland, Ohio, United States
- Died: November 5, 1974 (aged 85) Marbella, Spain
- Genres: Opera; Broadway musicals
- Occupation: Soprano

Marguerite Namara (born Marguerite Evelyn Cecilia Banks; November 19, 1888 – November 5, 1974) was a classically trained American lyric soprano whose varied career included serious opera, Broadway musicals, film and theater roles, and vocal recitals, and who counted among her lifelong circle of friends and acquaintances many of the leading artistic figures of the first half of the twentieth century.

== Childhood ==
She was born in Cleveland, Ohio, to a wealthy family with New England ties (she was descended on her father's side from Mayflower passengers John Alden and Priscilla Mullens and was a great-grandniece of Union General Nathaniel Prentice Banks, Governor of Massachusetts and Speaker of the U.S. House of Representatives).

Raised in Los Angeles from the age of five, she attended St. Vincent's School and Girls' Collegiate High School, studying piano and voice from an early age. As a teenager, she and her mother, who served as one of her early vocal coaches, made a recording for Thomas Edison, singing the Flower Duet from the Delibes opera, Lakmé.

== Early operatic career ==
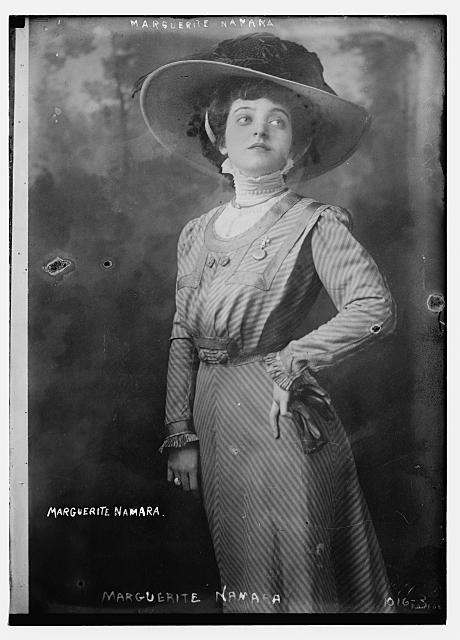
Namara during the early part of her career.

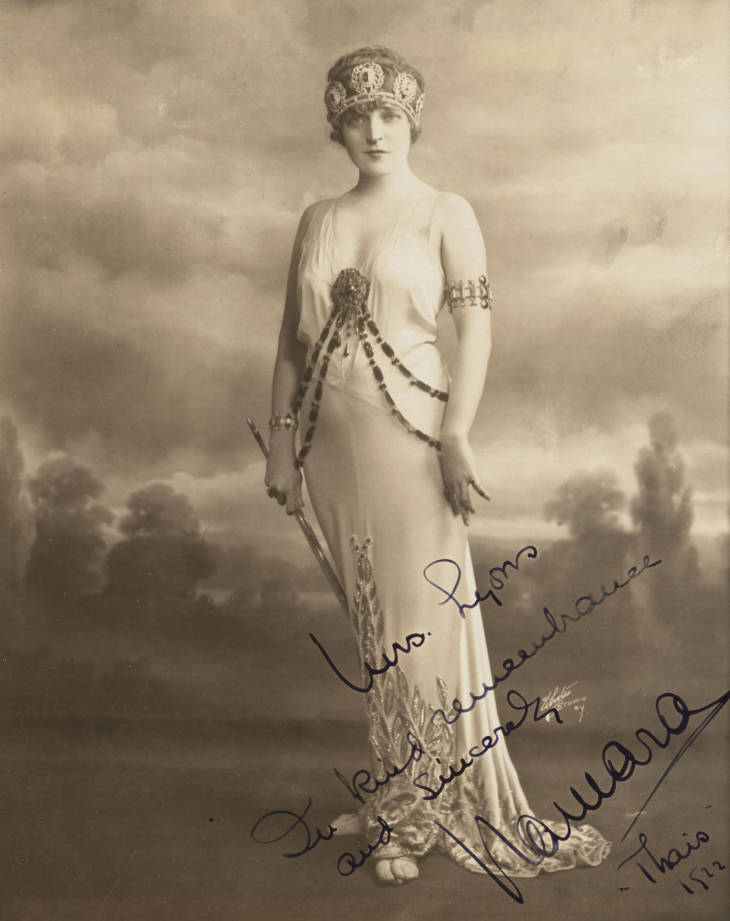
Namara in 1922.

At 18, Marguerite began studying at the Milan Conservatory, debuting a year later in 1908 as Marguerite in Gounod's Faust at the Teatro Politeamo in Genoa. She fashioned her stage name of Namara from her mother's maiden name, McNamara. From then on, she was referred to professionally as Madame Namara, and was called by family and friends as, simply, Namara. From 1910 to 1926, she sang with the Boston Opera Company, with the Chicago Opera Company (succeeding Mary Garden in Thaïs), with the Metropolitan Opera, and with Paris's Opéra-Comique. She sang lead roles in Cavalleria Rusticana, Manon, Carmen, Il trovatore, Tosca, La traviata and La bohème.

She also starred in operetta and musical comedy: Her 1915 Broadway debut came in a Franz Lehár operetta written especially for her entitled Alone at Last. She later starred for the Shuberts in revivals of H.M.S. Pinafore and The Mikado, and for the Philadelphia Grand Opera Company in Carmen. In addition, she regularly toured nationally and in Europe with leading orchestras.

She appeared at the Royal Albert Hall, London on five occasions between 1921 and 1925.

== Circle of friends ==
A 1926 letter written from France by F. Scott Fitzgerald noted that "Nobody was in Antibes that summer ...except me, Zelda, the Valentinos, the Murphys, Mistinguett, Rex Ingram, Dos Passos, Alice Terry, the MacLeishes, Charlie Brackett, Maud Kahn (daughter of philanthropist Otto Kahn; wife of Major-General Sir John Marriott), Esther Murphy (sister of Gerald; wife of John Strachey), Marguerite Namara, E. Oppenheimer (sic), Mannes the violinist, Floyd Dell, Max and Crystal Eastman, ex-premier Orlando, Etienne de Beaumont ... Just the right place to rough it, an escape from the world."

== Filmography ==
Stolen Moments, a 1920 silent picture in which she starred with Rudolph Valentino, was one of her few film projects, and it included a small part for her infant daughter Peggy as well. In 1931, she starred in the first musical film version of Carmen, a British Film Company picture given the unfortunate name of Gipsy Blood (sometimes billed as Gypsy Blood but usually referred to by Namara as "The Bloody Gypsy"). Her co-star was British actor Lester Matthews. Exteriors were filmed in Ronda, Spain, but the troupe recorded the music in London with the London Symphony Orchestra. Later films in which Namara played small parts included Thirty-Day Princess (1934) with Cary Grant and Sylvia Sidney, and Peter Ibbetson (1935) with Gary Cooper and Ann Harding.

== Later career ==
In the early 1930s, her singing voice strained from overwork, she appeared in the London cast of the Ivor Novello play, Party which opened in London on 23 May 1932. With the onset of the Depression, she returned to Hollywood and began teaching voice, counting the actors Ramón Novarro and Frances Drake among her pupils. Subsequent theatrical performances on Broadway and on tour included supporting parts in Enter Madame, Night of Love, Claudia, and Lo and Behold. During the 1940s/50s, her voice mellowed to that of a mezzo-soprano and she enjoyed modest success on the concert recital circuit, singing occasionally on radio. On tour, many of her costumes were designed by her friend and patroness, heiress Natalie Hays Hammond.

== Marriages ==
She was married three times: from 1910–1916 to her manager Frederick H. Toye (1887–1930), with whom she had a son, Frederick Namara Toye (1913–2005); from 1917–1926 to the playwright Guy Bolton (1884–1979), with whom she had a daughter, Marguerite Pamela "Peggy" Bolton (1916–2003) (the names Peggy and Pamela were chosen to honor the baby's godfather P. G. Wodehouse, whose first name was Pelham); and from 1937 until her death, to landscape architect Georg Hoy (1899–1983).

== Later life ==
In the 1940s and 50s, she divided her time between New York City and Europe. In the early 1960s, she and her third husband retired to a secluded ranch house on several acres in California's Carmel Valley, where she painted prolifically and recorded her last album in 1968, the year she turned 80. She died on November 5, 1974, in Marbella, Spain, two weeks shy of her 86th birthday. In addition to her two children, she was survived by two grandchildren, Elizabeth Namara Toye Williams and Frederick D. Toye, and by five great-grandchildren, Laurel Baker Tew, Robert Baker, Victoria Toye, Frederick Eugen Otto Toye, and Christopher Baker.

== Sources ==
- "Beautiful Society Bud Has Rare Ability as Composer", Los Angeles Examiner, 1907
- Bolton and Wodehouse and Kern: The Men Who Made Musical Comedy, by Lee Davis, New York: James H. Heineman, Inc., 1993 ISBN 0-87008-145-4
- Bring On The Girls, by P.G. Wodehouse and Guy Bolton, New York: Simon & Schuster, 1953
- Forsaken Altars: An Autobiography, by Marguerite D'Alvarez, London: Rupert Hart-Davis, 1954
- Here Lies Leonard Sillman—Straightened Out at Last, by Leonard Sillman, New York: Citadel Press, 1962
- "Los Angeles Music: Frederick H. Toye", by Belford Forrest, Society Magazine, December 27, 1913, 23-25
- "Madame Namara Makes Comeback In Concert Here", Chicago Tribune, January 17, 1940
- "Makes Operatic Debut In Genoa", The Cleveland News, 1908
- Melba, by John Hetherington, New York: Farrar, Straus, & Giroux, 1967
- Metropolitan Opera Annals, by William H. Seltsam, New York: H.W. Wilson Company, 1957
- "Multifaceted Star Namara Marks 80th Birthday With New Recording", by John Woolfenden, Monterey Peninsula Herald, August 13, 1968
- "Music in the Home", The Cleveland News, 1923
- The Musician's International Director and Biographical Record, New York: Shaw Publishing Company, 1950
- My Life, An Autobiography, by Isadora Duncan, Garden City Publishers, 1927
- "Namara Returns to Recital Stage", New York Times, January 25, 1940
- "Opera Honors Won By Local Girl", by Archie Bell, The Cleveland News, 1923
- "Postlude", by Ray C.B. Brown, The Washington Post, January 17, 1940
- Rudolph Valentino, The Man Behind the Myth, by Robert Oberfirst, New York: Citadel Press, 1962
- "She Too Longs For The Day When She Can Retire On A Farm", by Virginia Tracy, St. Louis Globe-Democrat, May 19, 1954
- Who's Who in the East, Chicago: Marquis Press, 1957
