= Edgeplain =

Historic house in Colorado, United States

- U.S. National Register of Historic Places
- Colorado State Register of Historic Properties No. 5EP.5097
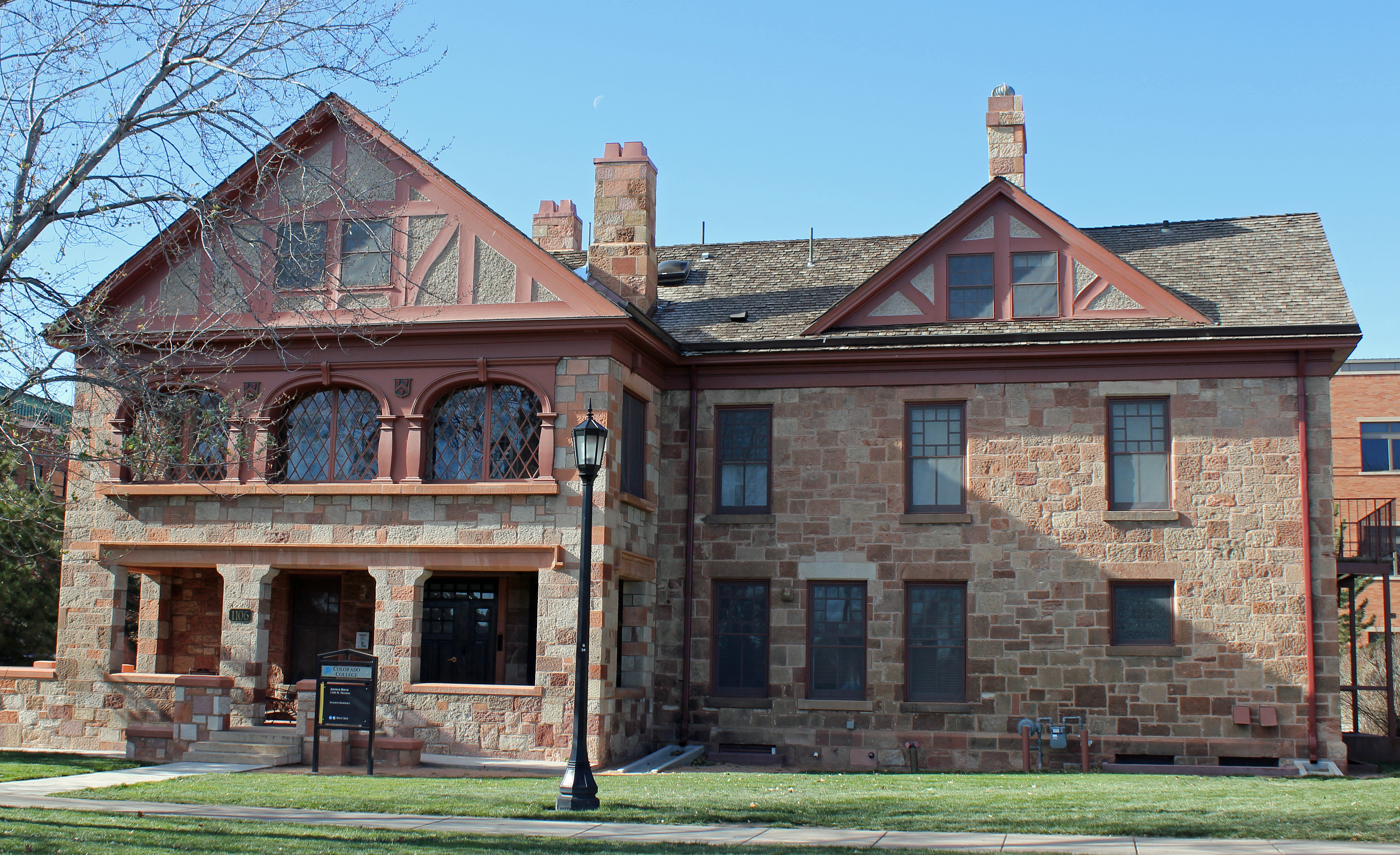

- Location within Colorado Location within the United States
- Location: 1106 N. Nevada Avenue, Colorado College, Colorado Springs, Colorado (private residence)
- Coordinates: 38°50′59″N 104°49′15″W
- Architect: Thompson Hetherington, Walter Douglas
- Architectural style: Late 19th And 20th Century Revivals
- NRHP reference No.: 06001048
- CSRHP No.: 5EP.5097

Significant dates
- Added to NRHP: November 21, 2006
- Designated CSRHP: November 21, 2006

Edgeplain, also known as the Arthur House, is a historic building used as a dormitory on the Colorado College campus in Colorado Springs, Colorado. It is on the National Register of Historic Places.

Arthur House was built by Lyman Bass, a successful attorney who partnered with Grover Cleveland and worked for William Jackson Palmer's Denver and Rio Grande Railroad. Later it was home to Chester Alan Arthur II, son of President Chester A. Arthur.

== History ==
=== Bass residence ===
Lyman K. Bass hired architect A.C. Williard to design a home in 1881. Bass was an attorney in practice with Grover Cleveland and a U.S. Representative in the state of New York. In 1874, Bass married Frances Metcalfe of Buffalo. He moved to Colorado Springs in the hope of improving his health after contracting tuberculosis. (See Tuberculosis treatment in Colorado Springs). While in the city he became an attorney for Denver and Rio Grande Railroad, General William Jackson Palmer's company.

Williard built a Tudor Revival home, lying alongside an undeveloped prairie. The couple named it "Edgeplain". It cost $115,000 to build. It featured distinctive stonework, with different colors and finishes, such as pecked and vermiculated masonry dressings. Tinted mortar was used between sandstone blocks of different sizes. Inside, John LaFarge designed jeweled glass, tiled fireplaces and opulent paneling. The couple entertained singers and musicians.

Bass died in New York City in May 1889. Francis sold the home following her husband's death. It was owned by several people before it was purchased by Chester Alan Arthur and his wife.

=== Arthur residence ===
Between 1901 and 1922, the home belonged to Chester Alan Arthur II, son of President Chester A. Arthur. He was called "the Prince of Washington" for the way he made the most of being the son of the President. He attended receptions and used the presidential yacht and car. After attending Princeton University, he studied law at Columbia University. After his graduation he went to Europe and stayed there for 10 years before he took the bar examination. He married wealthy divorcee Myra Fithian Andrews in May 1900 in Switzerland. Like Lyman Bass, Arthur and his bride came to Colorado for his health in October 1900. He had asthma and bronchitis. His health improved in the Colorado climate. He was made president of Cheyenne Mountain Country Club. Polo became a favored sport as the result of top polo players to the area. Vice President Theodore Roosevelt came to Colorado Springs, had dinner at Edgeplain and attended a polo match during his 1901 visit.

After Alan Arthur and his wife Myra purchased the home, they had it expanded and remodeled by Thompson Hetherington and Walter Douglas, prominent local architects who built Colorado College residential halls. Their home was "one of the outstanding meetings places of the social leaders from Colorado Springs and Denver.

=== Subsequent residents ===
Oklahoma businessman Joseph Abraham bought the furnished house in 1922 as a summer home for him and his wife Fannie for $30,000. Between 1926 and 1927 the Phi Delta Theta fraternity inhabited the house.

Abraham died and Fannie sold the house to John Shaver in 1929. He was owner of a department store chain from Minnesota to Washington and Oregon and sold his interests in 1927 to J. C. Penney Company. John worked until 1943. His wife Charlotte was a gardener and studied painting. Both Shavers died in 1960. Their daughters sold the house to Colorado College in 1962.

== Colorado College ==
Colorado College bought the house and used it as a men's dormitory. Later it became coed. The dorm lies on the western part of the campus and is home to about 20 students housed in rooms for 1, 2 or 3 people. It combines living, kitchen and recreational space.

== See also ==
- History of Colorado Springs, Colorado
