= Stolen Moments (film) =

1920 film by James Vincent

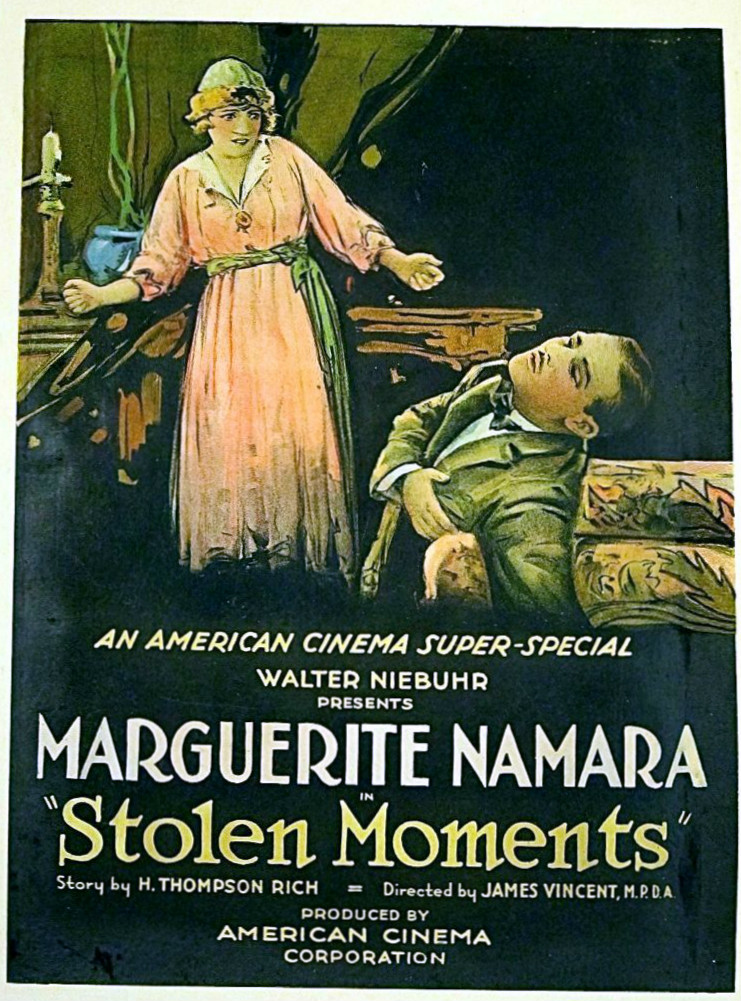
- Film poster
- Directed by: James Vincent
- Written by: H. Thompson Rich; Richard Hall
- Produced by: Jeffery Masino; Tracy Ryan Terhune
- Starring: Marguerite Namara; Rudolph Valentino
- Music by: Jon Mirsalis
- Distributed by: Pioneer Film Corporation
- Release date: December 1920
- Running time: Six reels (original; now lost); 35 minutes (1922 re-release; surviving)
- Country: United States
- Languages: Silent movie English intertitles

Stolen Moments (1920) is a silent romantic drama film starring Marguerite Namara with Rudolph Valentino playing a villain, the last film in which he played one. It was released in December 1920, just a few months before Valentino was elevated to stardom by his performance in The Four Horsemen of the Apocalypse (released March 6, 1921). In fact, filming of Stolen Moments was expedited so that Valentino could make it to Hollywood before filming began on The Four Horsemen of the Apocalypse.

== Plot ==
José Dalmarez is a Brazilian author who is also popular with readers in the United States.

In the opening scene, young Vera Blaine is walking through a park in Florida when she encounters Dalmarez. He gives her his photo, the back of which has a love poem. Enchanted, Vera later gives José a book that's similarly inscribed. José tells her he has to return to Brazil and invites her to accompany him. Excitedly, Vera reveals that she'll take her mother's wedding ring for the ceremony, but José clarifies that he was only inviting her to be his travel companion, not his wife.

Dalmarez proceeds to Brazil without Vera. In Brazil, he woos Inez Salles, the young daughter of a government official. Inez's protective brother, Alvarez, spies José and Inez kissing on a park bench; a fight ensues between the two men.

Dalmarez returns to the United States. To obtain information on criminal law for a book he's writing, Dalmarez stops Hugh Conway's law office. Dalmarez is surprised when Vera, who is now Hugh's wife, drops by. Hugh invites him to join them for dinner that evening, and Dalmarez offers to drive Vera home. During the drive home Dalmarez asks Vera how her husband would react if he read the notes she'd written during her earlier infatuation. Vera replies that he'd understand she was young and naive at the time, but Dalmarez expresses his doubts.

During dinner Hugh asks Dalmarez whether his new book is true to life. Dalmarez, casting the occasional side glance at Vera, replies: "I knew a girl who gave herself to a man in just the way I describe, and I could show you the letters and a book of poems to prove it."

When Dalmarez returns home he surprises his butler taking a nip from the liquor cabinet. The two begin to struggle, and the butler grabs a dagger Dalmarez has hanging on the wall. Dalmarez overpowers the older man, sends him away and places the dagger on his desk.

Vera arrives at Dalmarez's house to obtain the letters. He refuses to give them to her. She lunges for the place where they're concealed; Dalmarez grabs her and tries to kiss her. Struggling, she reaches down to the desk, picks up the dagger and strikes him in the face. He falls to the floor and she escapes, convinced she's killed him.

In the murder investigation, police note that facial scratches on the victim point to a female suspect. Realizing that a thorough investigation would find the notes she'd written, Vera slips into Dalmarez's house that night to retrieve the books and letters. She's followed by another person on a similar mission: Alvarez Salles, who traveled from Brazil to retrieve letters his sister had written to Dalmarez.

Alvarez tells police he came in the room and saw Dalmarez getting up off the floor. Alvarez admits to picking up the blade off the desk and delivering the fatal blow to Dalmarez, thereby clearing Vera of the murder.

== Cast ==
(In Order of Appearance)

- Marguerite Namara as Vera Blaine
- Rudolph Valentino as José Dalmarez
- Albert L. Barrett as Hugh Conway, an attorney
- Henrietta Simpson as Hugh's Mother
- Arthur Earle as Carlos - the Butler (as Arthur Earl)
- Walter Chapin as Richard Huntley, Hugh's partner
- Aileen Pringle as Inez Salles (billed as Aileen Savage)
- Alex K. Shannon as Campos Salles, Inez's father
- Gene Gauthier as Alvarez Salles, Inez's brother

== Production ==
Stolen Moments was filmed in St. Augustine, Florida and Savannah, Georgia (including at Greenwich Plantation), by American Cinema Corporation.

== Re-release ==
The re-release version of Stolen Moments

In its initial release in 1920, Stolen Moments was a six-reel feature vehicle for Marguerite Namara, a successful opera singer at the time. In November 1922, it was edited to a three-reel feature that emphasized Valentino's character and re-released by Select Pictures Corporation to capitalize on his stardom. The three-reel edit is the only version of the film known to exist today. The US television premiere of the shorter version was on Turner Classic Movies on May 22, 2006.
