= Frederic Timothy Murphy =

American soldier

- Born: September 4, 1884
- Died: May 23, 1924 (aged 39)
- Education: Yale University
- Spouse: Noël Haskins (m. 1920)
- Relatives: Gerald Clery Murphy (brother); Esther Murphy Strachey (sister)

Frederic Timothy Murphy (September 4, 1884 – May 23, 1924) was the heir of a wealthy Bostonian family who served during World War I in France and at the Battle of the Somme, was decorated with the Cross of the Legion of Honor, and died few years later due to his wounds.

== Biography ==
Frederic Timothy Murphy was born on September 4, 1884, in Boston, Massachusetts, the son of Patrick Francis Murphy (1858-1931), owner of the Mark Cross Company, sellers of fine leather goods, and Anna Elizabeth Ryan (circa 1858–1932). He had two siblings: Gerald Clery Murphy (1888–1964) and Esther Murphy Strachey (1897–1962).

Murphy attended Yale University, class 1908, and served during World War I with the Tank Corps. He was seriously wounded at the Battle of the Somme, and the French government awarded him the Cross of the Legion of Honor.

In 1920, he married Noël Haskins (1896–1982). Murphy died on May 23, 1924, of complications from injuries he had sustained in WWI. Haskins, inconsolable, bought a house in the village of Orgeval, Yvelines, northeast of Paris, not far from the Saint-Germain-en-Laye Old Communal Cemetery where her husband was buried. During World War II, Noël Haskins Murphy served with the Comité Américain de Secours Civil and refused to leave her Orgeval house, due to the fact she didn't want to leave her husband's gravesite. For this reason, she was deported to an internment camp in Vittel.
