= Utopian Society of America =

Depression-era American utopian organization (1933–1936)

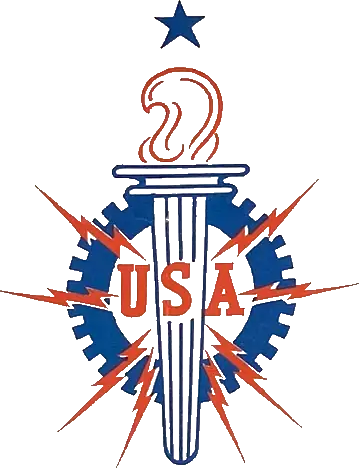
- Abbreviation: USA
- Formation: September 20, 1933
- Dissolved: 1936
- Type: Social movement; fraternal and educational organization
- Purpose: Economic reform; "production for consumption"; public ownership of production
- Headquarters: Los Angeles, California
- Key people: Merritt T. Kennedy; Eugene J. Reed; John G. Wenk; J. Frank Glendon
- Publication: Utopian News

The Utopian Society of America was a Great Depression-era organization based in California that promoted an economic planning, public ownership of major industries, and a "production for consumption" monetary system. The Society was inspired by Technocracy and Edward Bellamy's utopian socialism.

Founded in 1933, the Society combined fraternal rituals with political education and recruited members through "chain letter" house meetings. The Society claimed over 500,000 members at its peak in 1934, the vast majority in Los Angeles, California.

The Society's membership collapsed in 1935 as members blamed the undemocratic leadership for financial management. The Society became defunct by 1936.

Notable Society members include Gavin Arthur and J. Frank Glendon.

== Ideology ==
The Society's central demand was a planned economy. The Society strongly opposed "production for profit" and instead supported "production for consumption", with parallels to production for use. Money was to function only as a purchasing medium tied to annual production, rather than an asset to accumulate value. The Society advocated replacing profit-driven production with public ownership and operation of tools of production. The Society also distributed petitions calling for full utilization of productive capacity, a universal basic income to individuals, and universal retirement at 45 years old.

Society leaders strongly denied that the society was communist or fascist, and members swore an oath to uphold the United States Constitution. Reed stated the Society's aims were drawn from Edward Bellamy's 1888 utopian socialist novel Looking Backward and Nationalist Clubs movement. Some contemporaries likened the Society's ideology to Technocracy, because both supported socialization of industry and planned production.

== Organization ==
The Society operated as a semi-secret fraternal order with rites borrowed from secret societies. Initiates progressed through multiple "cycles" of ritual instruction. When the club was founded, members were identified only by numbers (such as "14x11") rather than names. The first cycle cost a $3 initiation fee and $0.10 in dues, and could occur at a "house party". The second cycle required the member to recruit 2 new members. The fifth cycle included secret signs and passwords. Despite the rituals, in practice, the Society was never particularly secretive, and became dramatically less so as thousands of new members joined. The membership rites were easily known to the public. After the June 1934 event at the Hollywood Bowl, the Society officially became a "semi-secret" organization.

The Society had started as a "trio" of three men. In early 1934, the Society formalized itself with a president and board of directors. J. Frank Glendon became the first Society president. The Society lacked democratic internal structures, with nearly all power in the hands of Reed, Glendon, and the board of directors. After a corruption scandal, this leadership group loosened its grip on power and promised to "democratize the movement", but the movement fizzled too quickly for this to occur.

The Society published a weekly newspaper, Utopian News, an official radio broadcast on Los Angeles station KMTR, and briefly organized a theater group whose productions were not overtly political.

== History ==
=== Background and founding ===
In the 1930s, during the Great Depression, Eugene J. Reed, an investment banker, became inspired by both the Technocracy movement and Edward Bellamy's utopian socialism. In August 1933, Reed and other Technocracy adherents concluded that Franklin D. Roosevelt would not adopt Technocracy as federal policy. Eugene J. Reed, Walter Rousseau, and Merritt Kennedy gathered with three others in Los Angeles to discuss economic alternatives and formed the Utopian Society of America, adopting a name whose initials matched "U.S.A.". The Society was officially created on September 20, 1933. The first induction meeting, held in a private home with fourteen people, established a multi-stage ritual system and a requirement that members recruit additional candidates in order to advance.

The Society was part of a broader surge of Depression-era reform movements, such as Upton Sinclair's End Poverty in California (EPIC) and the Townsend Plan movement.

=== Rapid rise ===
The Society grew dramatically, perhaps around 400 to 4000 new members per day. By the time that Los Angeles newspapers wrote about the Society in December 1933, it had over 100,000 members. In July 1934, the Society reported 573,000 members. Reed told the New York Times that the Society had 600,000 members in the West. Journalist George Creel attributed the expansion to the "chain-letter" structure of the house meetings, which were extremely successful.

In 1934, the Society held a series of extremely successful public events. In early 1934, the Society contracted with Shrine Auditorium and Expo Hall for nine mass events a week. On June 23, 1934, the Society drew over 30,000 for a gathering at the Hollywood Bowl, with a speech by Society President Glendon. Soon after, a Society event at Gilmore Stadium drew 30,000 to 40,000 attendees.

The Society soon expanded beyond Southern California, with reported chapters in other western states and later in the Midwest and East. A New York charter granted in November 1934 was organized by a California delegation that included Reed and created a separate legal entity called "Utopian Society of America, East". Although the membership mostly supported this new organization, lead to tensions with the original Los Angeles leadership and complicated claims about national authority.

=== Financial controversy and collapse ===
The Society had trouble retaining dedicated membership. The Society gave few social benefits or engaging work to its membership, who tended to drift away after rising a few ranks. Historian Joshua Stevens wrote that: "Other than the privilege of paying dues, learning secret grips, words, and signs, and wearing armbands, the Society offered no other benefits for its members." In addition, the Society was highly reliant on member signups ($3 upfront). The Society reported that just 10% of members paid dues ($0.10 per month). Historian Donald Whisenhunt argues that the Society came to resemble a Ponzi-like structure because it relied on continual recruitment to sustain cash flow and lacked a durable source of revenue.

When the Society, in August 1934, released its first financial statement, from October 1933 to July 1934, it showed receipts of just $96,839, of which $3825 from dues, against expenses of $87,237. Much of the spending went to salaries, administration, and a costly theater group project. This outraged the membership, who thought the leadership had criminally mismanaged the funds, and were convinced that the organization had much higher income than reported. Leadership concluded that costly projects, especially the society's theater group, had been mismanaged, which led to the removal or resignation of most Society leaders. President Glendon stepped down and was replaced by John G. Wenk. At the same time, critics labeled the movement a cult or accused it of racketeering.

The lack of democratic control, perceived financial mismanagement or corruption, and intense public criticism from centrists and conservatives undermined members' support for the Society. In January 1935, the Society reported just $1,849 in dues, a 50% decline from July 1934; at $0.10 per member, this implies that the Society had under 20,000 dues-paying members.

In 1935, the Society sent a delegation led by president John G. Wenk to Washington, D.C., to request a meeting with Franklin D. Roosevelt. The White House declined. In 1936, the Society's newspaper reported running out of funds. The final issue of the newspaper, in July 1936, announced an attempt to revive the ritual cycles, which were the Society's primary income source. No such revival appears to have occurred. The Society became defunct by mid-1936.

== Legacy ==
The Utopian Society of America has remained obscure despite its massive size, perhaps because it grew and collapsed so quickly. Historian Donald Whisenhunt compares the Society to Occupy Wall Street or the Tea Party movement: Short-lived movements whose organizational forms fizzled quickly, but whose politics dramatically reshaped mainstream politics. The Society's goal of a universal pension was ultimately enacted by Social Security under Franklin D. Roosevelt, though at a higher retirement age.

== See also ==
- End Poverty in California
- Townsend Plan
- Great Depression
