= William Murray (writer) =

American novelist

- Born: April 26, 1926; New York City, New York, U.S.
- Died: September 3, 2005 (aged 79); New York City, New York, U.S.
- Education: Harvard University
- Occupations: Fiction writer, journalist
- Employer(s): Esquire, The New Yorker
- Parent(s): Natalia Danesi Murray and William Murray
- Writing career
- Notable work: Shifty Lou Anderson series

William Murray (April 8, 1926 – March 9, 2005) was an American novelist, fiction editor, and staff writer at The New Yorker for more than thirty years.

== Biography ==
He was the son of Natalia Danesi Murray, editor at publishing houses Mondadori and Rizzoli, and William Murray, head of the William Morris Agency in New York. He attended Harvard University, but left after a year. He served in the military. At one time he wanted to be an opera singer.

His 1967 novel The Sweet Ride was adapted into a movie of the same name in 1968.

Before he joined The New Yorker, he wrote for Esquire magazine; in 1970 he published a book, Previews of Coming Attractions, collecting stories he had written for the magazine. Among his many contributions to The New Yorker was the magazine's "Letters from Italy" of which he was the sole author.

Murray's novel Malibu, published in 1980, was made into a two-part made-for-television drama film of the same name in 1983.

From 1984 to 1996, he wrote a series of mystery novels set in the world of horse racing, many featuring Shifty Lou Anderson, a professional magician and horseplayer.

Murray wrote a book about growing up with his mother and the latter's partner, Janet Flanner — Janet, My Mother, and Me (Simon & Schuster, 2000). The book was awarded Non-fiction Honors at the 2001 Stonewall Book Awards.

== Personal life and death ==
In 1966, Murray moved to Southern California. The majority of his later years were spent living in Del Mar, California, "exactly 3.2 miles from the finish line" of Del Mar Thoroughbred Club.

Murray died in March 2005 at age 78. Just prior to his death, Murray had completed a book about Chicago's Lyric Opera Center for American Artists.

== Selected works ==
- The Fugitive Romans: A Novel of Modern Italy (Vanguard Press, 1955)
- Mystery on the Island (Ladybird Books, Loughborough, 1966)
- The Sweet Ride (Signet, 1967)
- Previews of Coming Attractions: Scenes and Faces from the Permanent L.A. Fun Game (World Publishing Company, 1970)
- Malibu (Ballantine Books, 1980) ISBN 978-0345290304
- The Last Italian: Portrait of a People (Destination Book) (Touchstone, 1992) ISBN 978-0794603311
- The Wrong Horse: An Odyssey Through the American Racing Scene (Simon & Schuster, 1992) ISBN 978-0671767747
- The Right Horse: How to Win More, Lose Less and Have a Great Time at the Racetrack (Doubleday, 1997) ISBN 978-0385483537
- Janet, My Mother, and Me: A Memoir of Growing Up With Janet Flanner and Natalia Danesi Murray (Simon & Schuster, 2000) ISBN 0-684-80966-4
- City of the Soul: A Walk in Rome (Crown Journeys) (Crown, 2003) ISBN 978-0609606148
- Fortissimo: Backstage at the Opera with Sacred Monsters and Young Singers (Crown, 2005) ISBN 978-1400053605

Shifty Lou Anderson series

1. Tip on a Dead Crab (1984)
2. The Hard Knocker's Luck (1985)
3. When the Fat Man Sings (1987)
4. The King of the Nightcap (1989)
5. The Getaway Blues (1990)
6. I'm Getting Killed Right Here (1991)
7. We're Off to See the Killer (1993)
8. Now You See Her, Now You Don't (1995)
9. A Fine Italian Hand (1996)
