= Noël Haskins Murphy =

American performer (1896–1982)

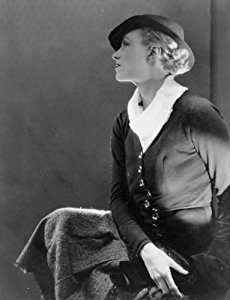
Nöel Haskins Murphy by George Hoyningen-Huene

Noël Haskins Murphy (December 25, 1894 – 1982) was an American performer, best-known as the wife and widow of Frederic Timothy Murphy (who died in 1924 of wounds suffered during World War I). She was also the lover of Paris-based American news correspondent Janet Flanner.

== Early life ==
Born Noël Haskins into the distinguished Havemeyer family, Haskins was one of two daughters of Charles Waldo Haskins (1852-1903), co-founder of the accounting firm Haskins and Sells, a predecessor to Deloitte, and Henrietta Sherman Havemeyer (1854-1928), the daughter of the wealthy sugar merchant Albert Havemeyer, whose brother, businessman William F. Havemeyer, was twice elected mayor of New York City.

Haskins trained to be a singer and was involved in theatre, performing with the Washington Square Players under the name Noël Haddon.

== Personal life ==
Noël Haskins Murphy lived in France from 1920 onward, after she married Frederic Timothy Murphy (1885-1924), brother of Gerald Murphy. Frederic, who was seriously wounded during World War I, died on May 23, 1924. Haskins Murphy, inconsolable, bought a house in the village of Orgeval, Yvelines, northwest of Paris, not far from the Saint-Germain-en-Laye Old Communal Cemetery where her husband was buried.

In 1931, Janet Flanner fell in love with Noël, whom she called Noeline, and they had a short-lived romance with Flanner spending a lot of time at Orgeval. Solita Solano, Flanner's long-time lover, accepted the relationship and was a frequent visitor at Murphy's country house. They separated in 1933. After Flanner, Solano started a relationship with Elizabeth Jenks Clark; in 1958, the two women moved to Orgeval as well. Solano died in 1975 and was buried in Orgeval.

During World War II, Haskins Murphy served with the Comité Américain de Secours Civil and refused to leave her Orgeval home or her husband's nearby gravesite. She was sent by the Nazis to an internment camp in Vittel.

== Death ==
She died in France in 1982.
