= Janet Flanner =

American writer and journalist (1892–1978)

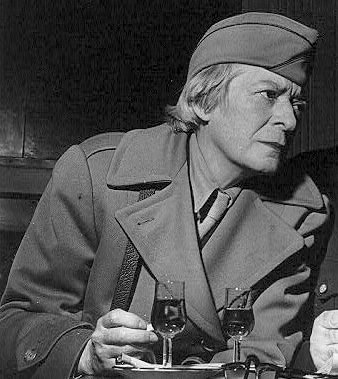
- Flanner at Les Deux Magots, during the liberation of Paris, 1944, with Ernest Hemingway
- Born: March 13, 1892; Indianapolis, Indiana, U.S.
- Died: November 7, 1978 (aged 86); New York City, U.S.
- Occupations: Writer; journalist; war correspondent
- Known for: Foreign correspondent in Paris, 1925–1975
- Spouse: William Rehm (m. 1918; div. 1926)
- Partners: Natalia Danesi Murray; Solita Solano; Noël Haskins Murphy

Janet Flanner (March 13, 1892 – November 7, 1978) was an American writer and pioneering narrative journalist who served as the Paris correspondent of The New Yorker magazine from 1925 until she retired in 1975. She wrote under the pen name "Genêt". She also published a single novel, The Cubical City, set in New York City.

She was a prominent member of America's expatriate community living in Paris before WWII. Along with her longtime partner Solita Solano, Flanner was called "a defining force in the creative expat scene in Paris". She returned to New York during the war. Flanner split her time between there and Paris until her death in 1978.

== Early life ==
Janet Flanner was born in Indianapolis, Indiana, to Frank and Mary Ellen Flanner (née Hockett), who were Quakers. She had two sisters, Marie and Hildegarde Flanner. Her father co-owned a mortuary and ran the first crematorium in the state of Indiana. After a period spent traveling abroad with her family and studies at Tudor Hall School for Girls (now Park Tudor School), she enrolled in the University of Chicago in 1912. She left the university in 1914. Two years later, she returned to her native city to take up a post as the first cinema critic on the local paper, the Indianapolis Star.

== Expatriate in Paris ==
While in New York, Flanner moved in the circle of the Algonquin Round Table, but was not a member. She also met the couple Jane Grant and Harold Ross, through painter Neysa McMein. It was based on this connection that Harold Ross offered Flanner the position of French Correspondent to The New Yorker.

After these early years spent in Pennsylvania and New York in her mid twenties, Flanner left the United States for Paris.

In September 1925 Flanner published her first "Letter from Paris" in The New Yorker, which had been launched the previous February. She would be professionally linked with the magazine for the next five decades. Her columns covered a wide range of topics, including artists, performances, and crime, including a lengthy feature on murderesses Christine and Léa Papin. She also published several installments about the Stavisky Affair. Flanner was also known for her obituaries—examples include those of Isadora Duncan and Edith Wharton.

Flanner had first come to the attention of editor Harold Ross through his first wife, Jane Grant, who was a friend of Flanner's from the Lucy Stone League. This organization fought for women to preserve their maiden names after marriage, in the manner of Lucy Stone. Flanner joined the group in 1921. Ross famously thought Flanner's pen name "Genêt" was French for "Janet".

Flanner wrote one novel, The Cubical City (1926), which achieved little success.

Flanner was a prominent member of the American expatriate community in Paris which included Ernest Hemingway, F. Scott Fitzgerald, John Dos Passos, E. E. Cummings, Hart Crane, Djuna Barnes, Ezra Pound, and Gertrude Stein - the world of the Lost Generation and Les Deux Magots. While in Paris she became very close friends with Gertrude Stein and her lover, Alice B. Toklas.

She played a crucial role in introducing her contemporaries to new artists in Paris, including Pablo Picasso, Georges Braque, Henri Matisse, André Gide, and Jean Cocteau, and the Ballets Russes dance company. She also introduced them to crime passionel and vernissage, the triumphant crossing of the Atlantic Ocean by pilot Charles Lindbergh and the depravities of the Stavisky Affair.

Her prose style has since come to epitomise the "New Yorker style"—its influence can be seen decades later in the prose of Bruce Chatwin. An example: "The late Jean De Koven was an average American tourist in Paris but for two exceptions: she never set foot in the Opéra, and she was murdered."

== War correspondent ==
Her New Yorker work during World War II included not only her famous "Letter from Paris" columns, but also included a seminal 3-part series in 1936 profiling Adolf Hitler.

After Hitler invaded Poland on September 1, 1939, Flanner moved back to New York City, where she lived with Natalia Danesi Murray and her son William Murray. She still wrote for The New Yorker, analyzing radio broadcasts and print reports about life in wartime Paris. She returned to Paris in 1944, contributing a series of weekly radio broadcasts entitled Listen: the Women for the Blue Network during the months following the liberation of Paris in late August 1944.

Flanner covered the Nuremberg trials (1945) for The New Yorker.

== Post-war ==
She covered the Suez Crisis, the Soviet invasion of Hungary, and the strife in Algeria which helped the return to power of Charles de Gaulle.

== Awards and recognitions ==
In 1948, Flanner was made a knight of Legion d'Honneur.

In 1958, Flanner was awarded an honorary doctorate by Smith College.

In 1966 she won the U.S. National Book Award in the Arts and Letters category for her Paris Journal, 1944–1965. Extracts of her Paris Journal were adapted as a piece for chorus and orchestra by composer Ned Rorem.

In 2019, Park Tudor School — the coed successor to the Tudor Hall for Girls (Flanner's alma mater) — posthumously awarded her their prestigious "distinguished alumni award". The school's fine arts department created a speaker series in her name, titled the Janet Flanner Visiting Artist Series.

== Personal life ==
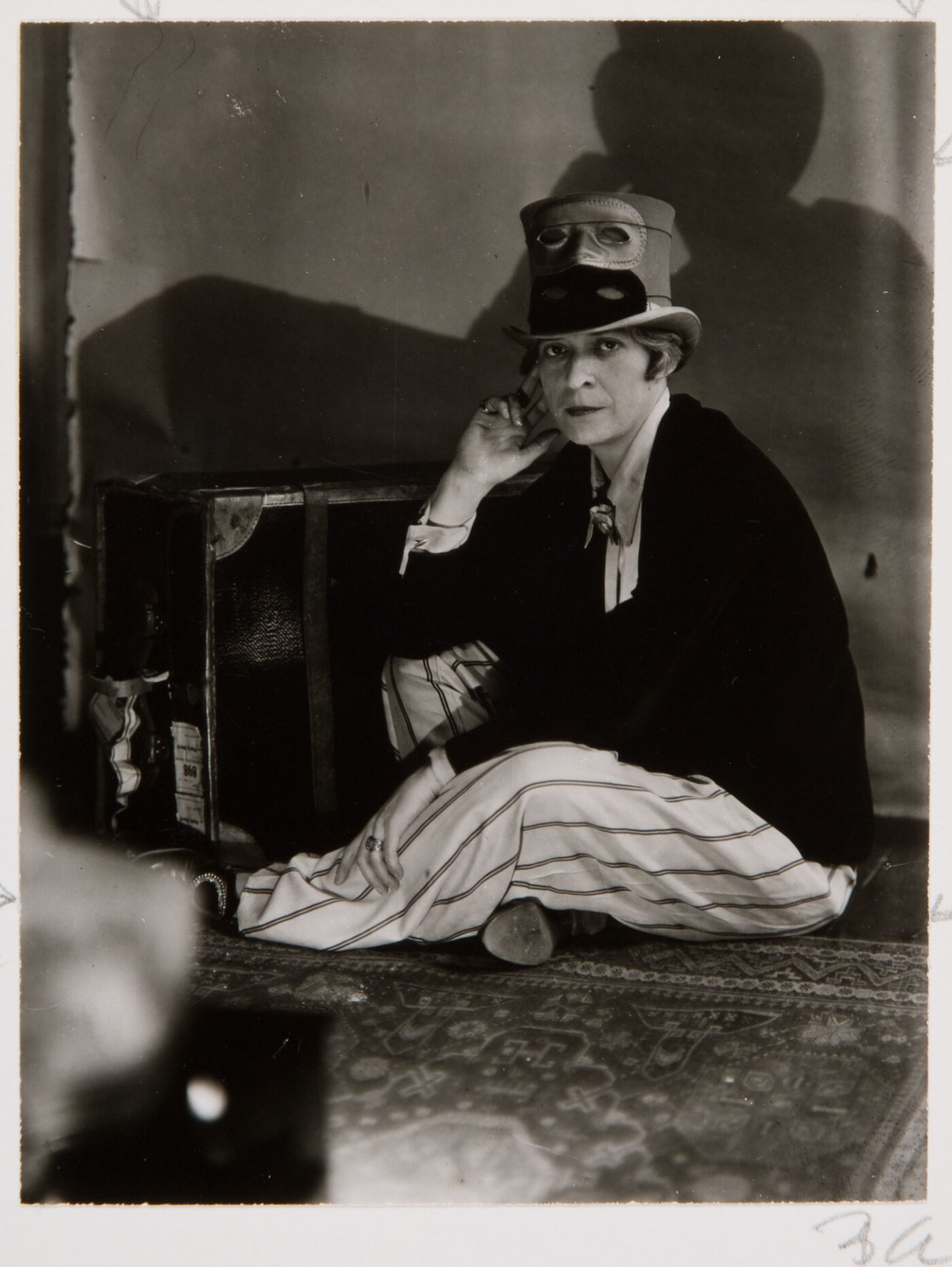
Janet Flanner, as Uncle Sam, at Nancy Cunard's fancy dress party, Paris, 1925; photograph by Berenice Abbott.

In 1918, Flanner married William "Lane" Rehm, a friend she had met while at the University of Chicago. He was working as an artist in New York City, and she later admitted that she married him to get out of Indianapolis. The marriage lasted for only a few years and they divorced amicably in 1926. Rehm was supportive of Flanner's career until his death.

In 1918, the same year she married her husband, she met Solita Solano in Greenwich Village. The two women became lifelong lovers, although both also became involved with other lovers throughout their relationship. Solano was drama editor for the New-York Tribune, and also wrote for National Geographic.

In 1932, Flanner fell in love with Noël Haskins Murphy, an American singer who lived in a village just outside Paris. They had a short-lived romance. This did not affect her relationship with Solano.

Flanner lived in Paris with Solano, who put away her own literary aspirations to be Flanner's personal secretary. They lived together for more than 50 years, but their relationship was not monogamous. In 1940, Flanner met Natalia Danesi Murray; their romance lasted until Flanner's death in 1978, though Flanner always had several relationships at a time. "You complain that I have three wives and the truth is, as you know, that I also have a husband, The New Yorker," Flanner once wrote to Murray.

Flanner frequently visited Los Angeles, where her mother Mary Flanner lived at 530 East Marigold St. in Altadena with her sister, poet Hildegarde Flanner, and brother-in-law, Frederick Monhoff.

Flanner was a chain smoker.

In 1975, she returned to New York City permanently, to be cared for by Murray. Flanner died on November 7, 1978. She was cremated. Her ashes were scattered along with Murray's over Cherry Grove in Fire Island where the two women had met in 1940, according to William Murray, Danesi Murray's son, in his book Janet, My Mother, and Me (2000).

== In popular culture ==
- Solita Solano and Flanner are portrayed as "Nip" and "Tuck" in the 1928 novel Ladies Almanack, by Djuna Barnes, a roman à clef about the amorous intrigues of the lesbian network centered in Natalie Clifford Barney's salon in Paris.
- Flanner is among the journalists cited as inspirations for the 2021 Wes Anderson film The French Dispatch.
- Flanner is briefly mentioned in Season 1 Episode 4 of Fran Lebowitz' Netflix series Pretend It's a City.
- In 1971, Flanner was the third guest during an infamous verbal scuffle between Gore Vidal and Norman Mailer on The Dick Cavett Show. In the course of trading insults with both fellow guests and their host, Mailer asked her to stop "muttering in the corner", and Flanner accused both Vidal and (particularly) Mailer of acting as if they were having a private conversation amongst themselves, while ignoring that there were other people at (and on) the show. Mailer asked her twice if she was "working as the referee or as Mr. Vidal's manager".

== Bibliography ==
=== Books ===
- The Cubical City: A Novel (1926)
- Paris Was Yesterday, 1925–1939, edited by Irving Drutman (1972)
- An American in Paris: Profile of an Interlude Between Two Wars (1940)
- Pétain: The Old Man of France (1944)
- London Was Yesterday, 1939–1945, edited by Irving Drutman (1975)
- Men & Monuments: Profiles of Picasso, Matisse, Braque, & Malraux (1957)
- Paris Journal, 1944–1965, edited by William Shawn (1965)
  - Later published separately as Paris Journal, 1944–1955 and Paris Journal, 1956–1964
- Paris Journal, 1965–1970, edited by William Shawn (1971)
- Janet Flanner's World: New and Uncollected Pieces, 1932–1975, edited by Irving Drutman (1979)
- Darlinghissima: Letters to a Friend, edited by Natalia Danesi Murray (1986)
- Conversation Pieces, an autobiographical book by illustrator Constantin Alajalov with text and commentary by Flanner (1942)
- Paris est une guerre : 1940-1945, translated from English by Hélène Cohen, foreword by Michèle Fitoussi Editions du sous-sol, 2020. (New Yorker columns, in French)

=== 'Letter from ...' columns in The New Yorker ===
From	Vol/No.	Date	Page(s)	Subject(s)
Paris	01/46	January 2, 1926	35	Annual degustation at Beaune; Prix de Goncourt; Parisian interest in American writers; social news; fashion trends, with mention of Chanel
Paris	22/30	September 7, 1946	82–88	August vacances recommence post-war; Paris Peace Conference; l'Union Gaulliste, Henri de Kérillis' De Gaulle Dictateur; de Goncourt exposition at the Louvre
Paris	24/45	January 1, 1949	53–56	Peace activist Garry Davis in Paris; Prix Goncourt and Prix Fémina announced; several modern art exhibitions, including ceramics by Pablo Picasso at the Maison de la Pensée Française; French politics
Rome	24/47	January 15, 1949	50–54	Christmas in Rome; postwar austerities and the Marshall Plan; new Christian-Democrat government; the new opera season at the Teatro dell'Opera under Paolo Salviucci; Luchino Visconti's production of "Rosalinda, O Come Vi Piace", with designs by Salvador Dalí
Paris	25/46	January 7, 1950	68–71	Postwar austerities; Marshall Plan; exhibitions – Exposition Moustache and a retrospective of André Bauchant; reissue of Jean Genet's Journal du Voleur; Edwige Feuillère in La Dame aux Camélias
Paris	25/50	February 4, 1950	80–83	The Generals' Scandal – Georges Revers, Charles Mast; publication of Le Deuxième Sexe by Simone de Beauvoir
