= Cheyenne Mountain Country Club =

Country club in Colorado, United States

- Founded: 1891
- Website: www.cheyennemountaincountryclub.com

The Cheyenne Mountain Country Club is located in Colorado Springs, Colorado, at the mouth of Cheyenne Canyon.

== History ==
=== Club founded ===
The Cheyenne Mountain Country Club Association was founded on February 19, 1891. The founders were successful men or came from wealthy families, many of whom came to Colorado for the climate and high altitude as a means to improve their health. (Note: Founders included "Dr. B.F.D. Adams, Arthur Baker, Thomas W. Edsall, E.C.G. Robinson, William H. Sanford, William R. Varker, C.H. White, William J. Wilcox, and Henry Le B. Wills.)

Two years prior, in April 1889, a country club was created that offered members facilities for polo, golf, cricket, equestrian riding, shooting, horse racing, shooting and bowling facilities. William A. Otis sold the club a casino and property for the country club in 1891. The club then became the Cheyenne Mountain Country Club.

=== Early years ===
William H. Sanford was the Cheyenne Mountain Country Club's first president and was head of the Polo Committee. Foxhall P. Keene joined the team as a non-resident player in 1896. President Theodore Roosevelt, Harry Payne Whitney and John Percival "Percy" Hagerman played on the club's polo fields.

Members—who came from England, Europe, and the east coast of the United States—were called "Grizzlies". They were generally socialites and businessmen in mining or other industries. By the 1890s, a trolley system was inaugurated to run from downtown Colorado Springs to the Broadmoor Casino and the Cheyenne Mountain Country Club. In 1893, Spencer Penrose was made a member.

Chester Alan Arthur II was president of Cheyenne Mountain Country Club between 1905 and 1908. He also provided funding for facilities at the club. Richard Bolles was the country club's president for 6 years.

At one time the club used live birds for shooting events and docked polo ponies tails; To address concerns about humane treatment the club switched to clay pigeons for shooting and discontinued docking ponies tails.

The club won the Rocky Mountain Polo Championship and the Interstate Polo Club trophy in 1906 and 1907.

=== Broadmoor Hotel ===
Spencer Penrose built the "premier golfing resort", The Broadmoor near the country club. To further attract patrons to the hotel, Penrose developed a polo team. As a result of The Broadmoor resort's success, the country club has not had the notoriety of its early years.

== Club facilities ==
Polo is no longer played at the country club. As an homage to the club's polo-playing history, there is an exhibit with the Foxhall Keene Cup.
