= Solita Solano =

American writer, poet and journalist (1888–1975)

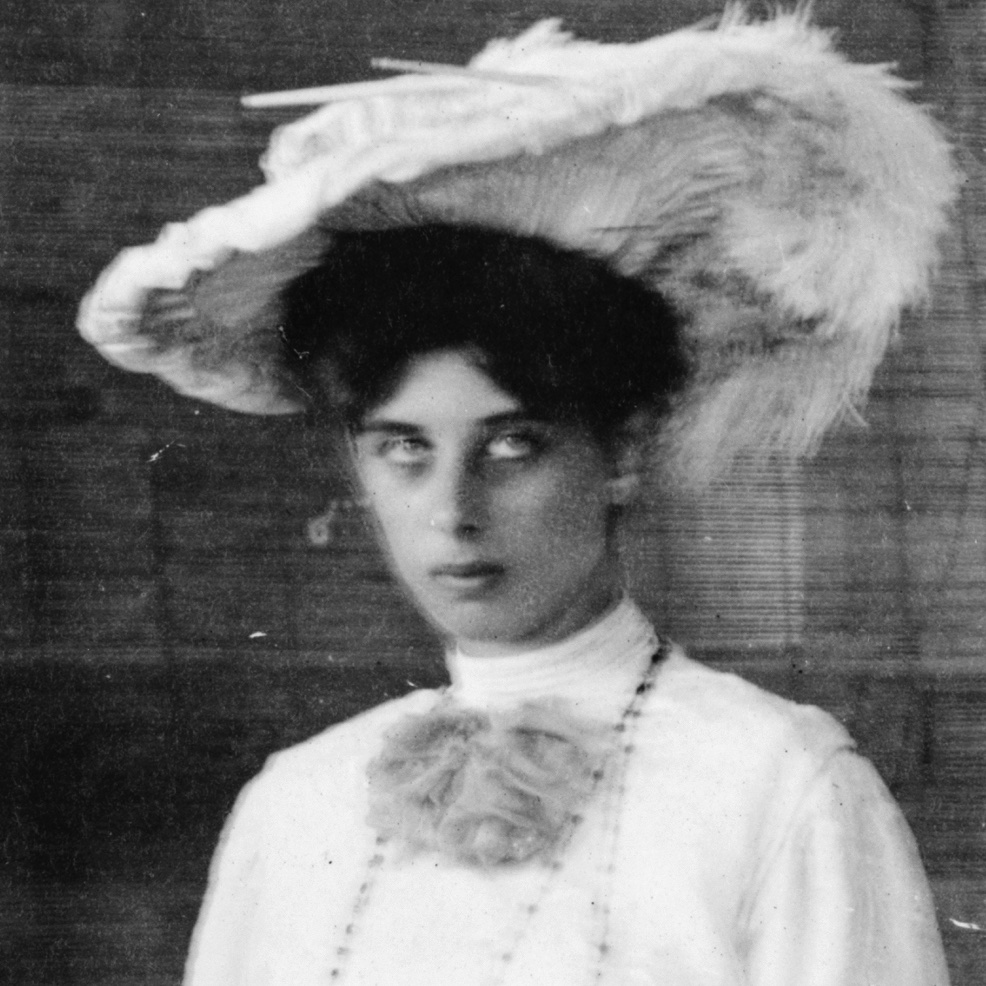
- Born: Sarah Wilkinson; 1888 Troy, New York, US
- Died: November 22, 1975 (aged 86–87) Orgeval, Yvelines, France
- Genre: Poetry, criticism, fiction
- Partner: Janet Flanner

Solita Solano (born Sarah Wilkinson; October 30, 1888 – November 22, 1975) was an American writer, poet and journalist.

== Biography ==
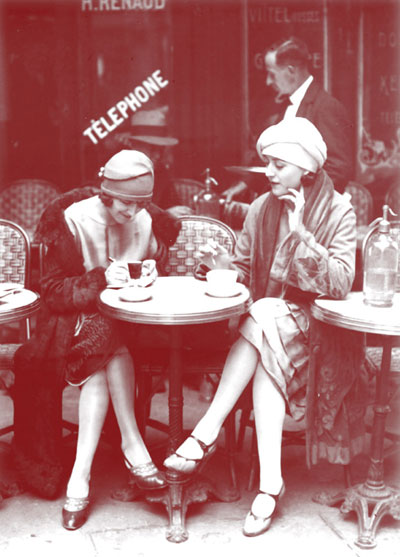
Solita Solano and Djuna Barnes in Paris (Maurice Brange, Au Café, 1922)

=== Early life ===
Sarah Wilkinson came from a middle-class family and attended the Emma Willard School in Troy, New York. After the death of her father, she left home and married her childhood sweetheart Oliver Filley. They spent the next four years in the Philippines, China and Japan, where her husband worked as an engineer. They returned to New York in 1908, where she started work as a theatre critic and drama editor with the New-York Tribune and as a freelance contributor to the National Geographic Society. At this time she changed her name to Solita Solano.

=== Career and relationships ===
In Greenwich Village in 1919, Solano got to know the journalist Janet Flanner, with whom she started a relationship. In 1921 they travelled to Greece, where Janet was to work on a report for National Geographic on Constantinople. Solano had three books published, and as they were not very successful, returned to journalism. In 1922, they travelled to France, and in Paris joined the intellectual-lesbian circle of Gertrude Stein and Alice B. Toklas, Natalie Clifford Barney, Romaine Brooks and Djuna Barnes.

In 1929, Solano had an affair with Margaret Anderson, founder of The Little Review, who had come to Paris with her lover, French singer Georgette Leblanc. The affair lasted several years, though Anderson remained living with Leblanc.

While in Paris, Janet Flanner started writing, under the pseudonym Genêt, the Letter from Paris, for The New Yorker. After the outbreak of World War II Solano and Flanner returned to New York.

A few years later Solano left Flanner after Flanner started an affair with Natalia Danesi Murray; meanwhile Solano fell in love with Elizabeth Jenks Clark. Margaret Anderson got to know Clark through Solano after Clark returned to the US. Clark and Solano became Anderson's closest friends, although Anderson had in the meantime fallen in love with Dorothy Caruso, widow of the singer Enrico Caruso.

=== The Rope (Gurdjieff group) ===
During the 1930s and 40s, Solano studied with G. I. Gurdjieff, and for a while acted as his secretary. She was a member of a female-only, key Gurdjieff group known as The Rope, to which Jane Heap, Margaret Anderson, and Kathryn Hulme also belonged. After Gurdjieff's death in 1949, Solano became the focal point for members of The Rope until her own death. Her notes of Gurdjieff's meetings with The Rope are a remarkable record of his personality and method.

=== Later life and death ===
After the war Solano returned to France, where she died at the age of 87.

== Sources ==
- Berenice Abbott: Portrait of Solita Solano, Parasol Press, Ltd. (1981)
- William Patrick Patterson: Ladies of the Rope: Gurdjieff's Special Left Bank Women's Group, Arete Pubns (1998) ISBN 1-879514-41-9
- Andrea Weiss: Paris war eine Frau, Rowohlt (1998) ISBN 3-499-22257-4
- Gabriele Griffin: Who's Who in Lesbian and Gay and Writing, Routledge, London (2002)
