= Natalia Danesi Murray =

American publisher (1901–1994)

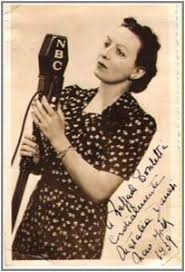
Natalia Danesi Murray

Natalia Danesi Murray (December 14, 1901 – June 9, 1994) was an American publishing executive and book editor. She was a key figure in promoting American writers to Italian readers. She was the longtime partner of American writer Janet Flanner.

== Early life ==
Natalia Danesi was born in Rome in December 14, 1901. Her mother, Ester Danesi, was the editor of a women's magazine, La Donna. Her son wrote that, as a young woman, Natalia Danesi was seduced by the soldier and writer Gabriele D'Annunzio.

In 1924, she emigrated to the United States.

== Career ==
In the 1930s, she was an actress on Broadway.

During World War II, from 1938 to 1944, she worked for an NBC radio program to broadcast short-wave news to Italy. In 1944, she was director of the press bureau of the Office of War Information in Rome. In 1945, she was head of the Special Projects Division of the United States Information Service in Rome. In 1946, she was a freelance correspondent in Italy.

In 1951, she became the head of the New York headquarters of Arnoldo Mondadori, the Italian publishing house. In 1966, she accepted the position of vice-president of the New York office of another Italian publisher, Rizzoli Editore, a position she covered until the 1970s. She was a key figure in promoting American writers to Italian readers.

In 1972, she was decorated with the Order of Cavaliere al Merito by the Italian Republic.

In 1979, she was the main stakeholder in the publishing of Janet Flanner's World: Uncollected Writings, 1932–1975, edited by Irving Drutman.

In 1985, she edited and commented the book Darlinghissima: Letters to a Friend, by Janet Flanner. The book is a collection of letters between the two women. Danesi Murray called their relationship a "passionate friendship" which lasted from 1940 until Flanner's death 1978.

== Personal life ==
In 1924, she married William Murray (died 1949), head of William Morris Agency in New York. They divorced in 1936.

From 1940 to 1978, she had a relationship with Janet Flanner, from 1940 to 1944, living together in New York City, and then long-distance, Danesi Murray living in New York, Flanner in Paris. Flanner had also other relationships, and when Danesi Murray complained about that, Flanner replied: "You complain that I have three wives and the truth is, as you know, that I also have a husband, The New Yorker." In 1975, Flanner returned to New York City, permanently, to be cared for by Murray.

She died on June 9, 1994, aged 92, at Del Mar, California. She was cremated and her ashes, mingled with those of Flanner, were scattered over Cherry Grove in Fire Island, where the two had met, in 1940.

== Legacy ==
Natalia Danesi Murray's son, William Murray, wrote a book about growing up with her mother and the latter partner, Janet Flanner — Janet, My Mother, and Me (Simon & Schuster, 2000).

The Janet Flanner and Natalia Danesi Murray Papers were conveyed to the Library of Congress in 1994 and 2000 by Murray at the bequest of his mother.
