= Mark Cross (brand) =

American leather brand

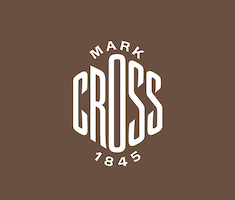
- Type: Private
- Industry: Luxury leather goods
- Founded: 1845
- Products: Handbags
- Website: Mark Cross

Mark Cross is an American luxury leather goods brand. Founded in 1845, the company started as a bridle, harness, and saddle maker before shifting to luxury leather goods.

== History ==
Mark Cross opened its doors in Boston in 1845, eventually moving its headquarters to New York. Soon after, employee Patrick Murphy purchased Mark Cross and expanded the product offering to luxury leather goods.

Patrick’s son, Gerald Murphy, took over as the company’s president in 1934 after years of living abroad. Before leading Mark Cross, he and wife Sara were wealthy expatriates living at Cap d'Antibes and forming relationships with many artists and writers of the Lost Generation.

Gerald’s friendship with Alfred Hitchcock led to him to design an overnight case for Grace Kelly’s character in the 1954 movie Rear Window - an early example of product placement in film. Later, one with Lee Iacocca led to Mark Cross branding being used on 1980s Chrysler cars equipped with leather upholstery.

After the Murphys sold the business, Mark Cross went through a succession of different ownership until it was shut down in the late 1990s by its then-owner Sara Lee. It was purchased by Neal J. Fox and relaunched in 2011, manufacturing its products in the same Italian factories as the company did over 40 years earlier.
