= Gavin Arthur =

American astrologer and sexologist (1901–1972)

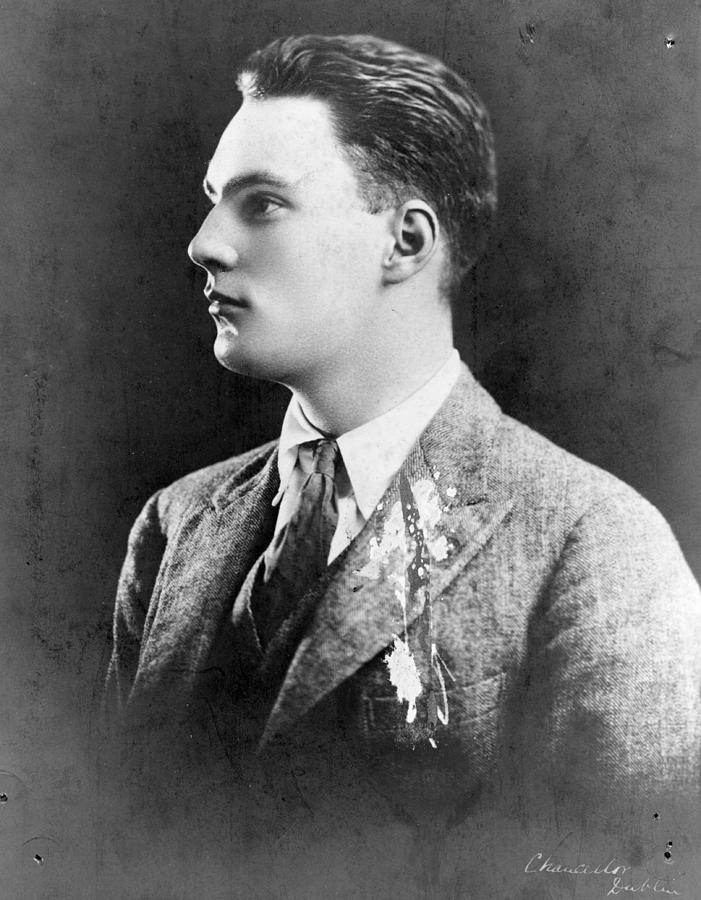
- Arthur, c. 1920
- Born: Chester Alan Arthur III; March 21, 1901; Colorado Springs, Colorado, US
- Died: April 28, 1972 (aged 71); Fort Miley Veterans Hospital, San Francisco, California, US
- Education: Columbia College; San Francisco State College
- Occupations: Astrologer; sexologist
- Spouses: Charlotte Joy Wilson (m. 1922; div. 1932); Esther Murphy Strachey (m. 1935; div. 1961); Ellen Jansen (m. 1965)
- Father: Chester Alan Arthur II
- Relatives: Chester A. Arthur (grandfather); William Lewis Herndon (great-grandfather)

Chester Alan "Gavin" Arthur III (March 21, 1901 – April 28, 1972) was an American astrologer and sexologist. He was the grandson of Chester A. Arthur, the 21st president of the United States. He received his early education from Columbia College and later joined the Philolexian Society. He left his college and participated in the Irish Republican Movement. During his time in Ireland, he began going by the name Gavin.

Arthur founded Dune Forum, a short-lived cultural magazine aimed to spread alternating religious and political ideologies. After his father's death, he inherited various official documents, including newspapers during the time of his grandfather's presidency and presidential memento. In the 1950s, due to financial instability, Arthur sold newspapers on the streets of San Francisco. In the 1960s, he published The Circle of Sex, where he claimed that he had developed sexual intimacy with Edward Carpenter. He also claimed that Carpenter had had sexual relations with American author Walt Whitman. Arthur died in 1972; he was the last living descendant of the Arthur family. Most of his papers and official documents were donated to the Library of Congress.

== Early life and education ==
Chester Alan Arthur III was born in Colorado Springs, Colorado, on March 21, 1901, to Chester Alan Arthur II and his wife, Myra Fithian Andrews. He was the grandson of Chester A. Arthur, twenty-first president of the United States. Chester Alan Arthur II was an indirect stakeholder in the Trinchera Estate, a 250,000 acres (1,000 km^{2}) ranch which was one of the main sources of income for his family. During the early 1920s, Arthur studied at Columbia College in New York; he was a member of the Class of 1924 and also of the Philolexian Society. Arthur was an admirer of the works of the British poet and activist Edward Carpenter.

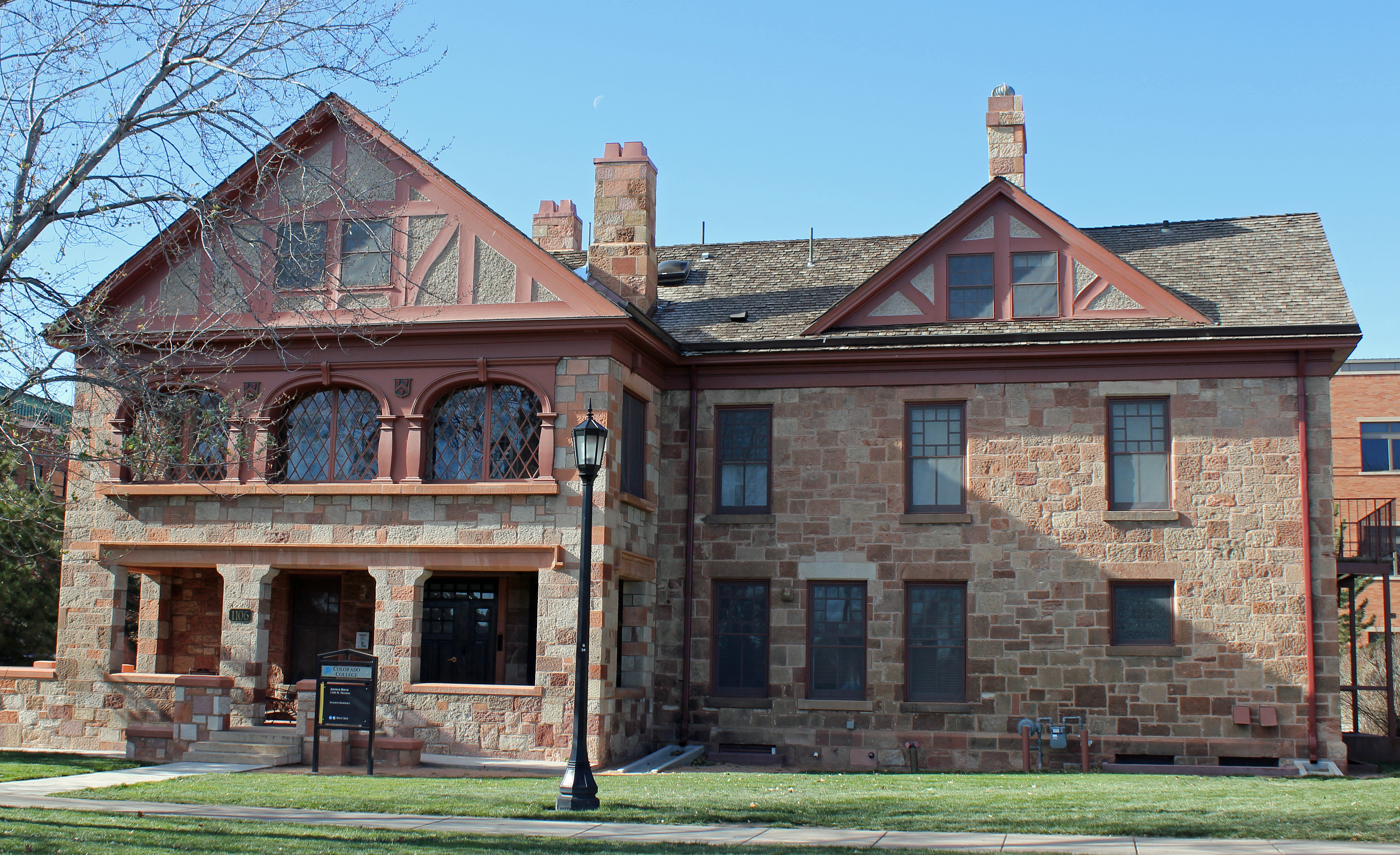
Arthur's childhood home in Colorado Springs, Colorado

== Career ==
=== Early career ===
After leaving college, Arthur worked in the Irish Republican Movement, living in New York, France, and Ireland. While in Europe, Arthur and his wife Charlotte had roles in the 1930 avant-garde film Borderline, which also starred H.D. and Paul Robeson. In the early 1930s, he moved to Pismo Beach, California, and began going by the name "Gavin". Arthur founded an art and literature commune and published a short-lived magazine, Dune Forum, with an intention to "express the creative thought of America looking not toward Europe but toward the West" and spread alternating religious and political ideologies. Amy Hart wrote that the magazine was a "platform where Dunites could express their varied worldviews and religious ideals". Dunites were group of artists and mystics who lived in Guadalupe-Nipomo Dunes from the 1930s till 1950s. Arthur, one of the most famous dunites, described the group as "intensely individualistic, with ideas as different one from another as any in the country" in the Dune Forum. The magazine was released in seven issues between 1933 and 1934.

In 1934, Arthur joined the Utopian Society of America. Between 1936 and 1937, he wrote six articles published in Labor Defender and he served as an editor with Langston Hughes. Upon his father's death in 1937, all of Arthur II's financial assets were distributed equally between his son Gavin and his wife. He inherited various receipts, bills, checkbooks, presidential mementos, newspaper clippings from his grandfather's presidency, and correspondence letters from politicians such as Ulysses S. Grant, James A. Garfield, Millard Fillmore, James G. Blaine, among others. He received typed copies of various important documents. Arthur served as secretary of the California Democratic Party in 1940, during the administration of Franklin D. Roosevelt, but resigned the following year, convinced that the party had betrayed his principles. During World War II, Arthur served in the United States Army and the Merchant navy.

After the war, Arthur moved to New York and undertook the writing of a family history, which was never completed. Returning to California in 1949, Arthur taught classes at San Quentin State Prison for many years. In 1952, he finished his bachelor's degree at San Francisco State College. Often low on funds, Arthur sold newspapers on the streets of San Francisco in the 1950s and 1960s. At the same time, he began to gain fame as an astrologer.

=== The Circle of Sex ===
A sexologist by profession, Arthur published The Circle of Sex in 1962 that analyzed human sexuality through the lens of yin-yang polarities. Rather than the linear scale developed by Alfred Kinsey, Arthur envisioned sexuality as a wheel with twelve orientations, six for each sex. The twelve types corresponded to the 12-hour clock dial and Arthur illustrated each with a historical archetype, like Don Juan, Sappho, and Lady C. In 1965, Playboy published a review of The Circle of Sex by Alan Watts which summarized the book. In 1966, Arthur published an enlarged edition of the same title. In that edition, he claimed that on his first visit with Carpenter, they both developed a sexual intimacy. Carpenter later told him that he had been sexual with American author Walt Whitman as well. Arthur, bisexual himself, was said to have been intimate with Neal Cassady as well.

=== Astrology and later career ===
Arthur was friend to many people of the Beat Generation, including Allen Ginsberg and Alan Watts. He was active in the early gay rights movement, and was also a leader of the Haight-Ashbury counterculture. Arthur used his astrology to decide the date for the first "Human Be-In" event on January 14, 1967. Over 30,000 people, including many Gypsies attended the event. During the presidency of John F. Kennedy, according to The New York Times, he helped the first lady Jacqueline Kennedy to "locate art objects stored and forgotten by previous Presidential occupants". Arthur believed he was in spiritual connections with local Chumash Indians. His friends included F. Scott Fitzgerald, Ernest Hemingway, Eleanor Roosevelt, and Winston Churchill,. Arthur would refer to himself as a "pre-hippie hippie".

== Personal life and death ==
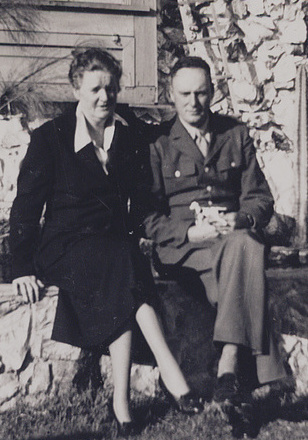
Gavin with his second wife Esther Murphy Strachey in the 1940s

Arthur was married three times. In 1922, he married Charlotte Joy Johnson, divorcing her in 1932. Three years later, he wed Esther Murphy Strachey, whom he divorced in 1961. His final marriage, to Ellen Jansen, took place in 1965.

Arthur died on April 28, 1972, at the Fort Miley Veterans Hospital in San Francisco after a fall. He is buried at the Albany Rural Cemetery. Having no children of his own, he was the last living descendant of his grandfather, President Chester A. Arthur. His papers, including many family papers, were given to the Library of Congress soon after his death. Philip Avillo wrote that "Throughout his life, Arthur cultivated a wide variety of people, including political leaders, writers, entertainers, sexologists, and social misfits and outcasts."

== Works cited ==
- "Chester A. Arthur". Argus-Courier. Associated Press. May 1, 1972. p. 5 – via Newspapers.com.
- Avillo, Philip, ed. (2011). "Arthur Family Papers" (PDF). Library of Congress. pp. 1–15. LCCN mm76049577.
- Christy, J. (2007). "He's Still the Man; A New Life of Allen Ginsberg Gets the Cherished Yet Underrated Beat Figure Exactly Right Capturing the Creative, Nurturing Soul he Remained Despite Being the Most Accessible Famous Writer Ever, Says One Who Was There, Biography". Toronto Star. p. D4. ProQuest 439121964.
- "Philolexian Literary Society". Columbia Spectator. Vol. XLIV, no. 139. May 6, 1921. p. 1 – via Columbia University Libraries.
- Fackenthal, F. Diehl, ed. (1932). Columbia University Alumni Register, 1754–1931. Columbia University Press – via HathiTrust. This article incorporates text from this source, which is in the public domain.
- Goldberg, Danny (January 13, 2017). "All the Human Be-In Was Saying 50 Years Ago, Was Give Peace a Chance". The Nation.
- Hart, Amy (2017). "The Gods of the Dunes: The Diverse Spiritual Practices and Beliefs of the Dunites". Communal Societies. 37 (2): 153–170. ProQuest 2008823252.
- Hallenbeck, Brent (February 21, 2022). "A Look at VT's Other President: Chester Alan Arthur Served as 21st President". The Burlington Free Press. pp. A1. ProQuest 2630697537.
- Lipsky, Bill (2017). "Gavin Arthur and the Summer of Love". San Francisco Bay Times.
- Meyer, Michael (2000) [1976]. The Astrology of Relationship: A Humanistic Approach to the Practice of Synastry. iUniverse. pp. 44–49. ISBN 978-0-595-08934-5 – via Google Books.
- Morgan, Bill (2006). I Celebrate Myself: The Somewhat Private Life of Allen Ginsberg. Penguin. p. 294. ISBN 978-0-14-311249-5 – via Google Books.
- Murray, Martin (2005). "Walt Whitman, Edward Carpenter, Gavin Arthur, and The Circle of Sex". Walt Whitman Quarterly Review. 22 (4). University of Iowa: 194–198. doi:10.13008/2153-3695.1772. ISSN 0737-0679.
- "Colorado – El Paso County". National Register of Historic Places. Archived from the original on June 1, 2013.
- O'Pray, Michael (1996). The British Avant-Garde Film, 1926–1995: An Anthology of Writings. University of Luton Press. ISBN 978-1-86020-004-5 – via Google Books.
- Reeves, Thomas C. (1972). "The Search for the Chester Alan Arthur Papers". Wisconsin Magazine of History. 55 (4). Wisconsin Historical Society: 310–319. JSTOR 4634741.
- "Grandson of President Arthur Dies". San Mateo County Times. Associated Press. May 1, 1972. p. 7 – via Newspapers.com.
- Summers, Danny (January 21, 2021) [December 18, 2019]. "Chester A. Arthur II was a sportsman; From the Sidelines". The Gazette.
- "Chester Arthur 3D Dies on Coast at 71". The New York Times. Associated Press. April 30, 1972. p. 67.
- "Press: Names". Time. January 22, 1934.
