= Gerald and Sara Murphy =

American socialites

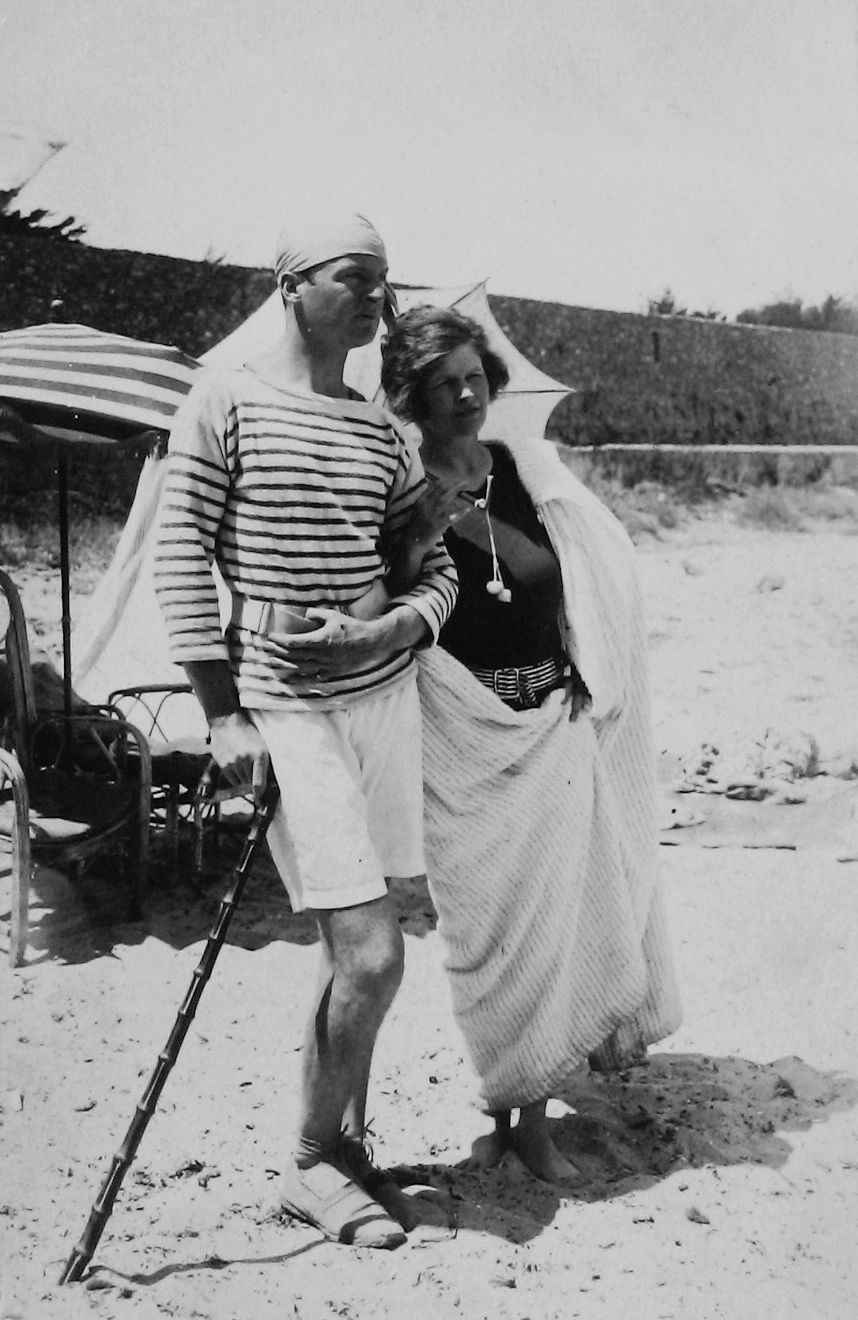
- Gerald and Sarah Murphy at Cap d'Antibes beach in 1923
- Born: Gerald Clery Murphy March 26, 1888 Boston, Massachusetts, U.S.; Sara Sherman Wiborg November 7, 1883 Cincinnati, Ohio, U.S.
- Died: Gerald October 17, 1964 (aged 76) East Hampton, New York, U.S.; Sara October 10, 1975 (aged 91) Arlington, Virginia, U.S.
- Occupations: Businessman, heirs, socialites
- Children: Three

Gerald Clery Murphy (March 26, 1888 – October 17, 1964) and Sara Sherman Murphy (née Wiborg; November 7, 1883 – October 10, 1975) were an American expatriate couple who were primarily known as socialites on the French Riviera, where they created a vibrant social circle that included a great number of artists and writers of the Lost Generation.

== Gerald Murphy ==
Gerald Clery Murphy was born in Boston, Massachusetts, the second of three children, to Patrick Francis Murphy, a businessman and state legislator, and Anna Elizabeth Murphy (née Ryan; 1858–1932), into an affluent and prominent Irish-American family. His siblings were Frederic Timothy Murphy and Esther Knesborough.

His grandparents were all born in Ireland and immigrated to the United States in the 19th century. His father, Patrick Murphy, acquired the leathermaker Mark Cross, subsequently after the founder and his son died and became a self-made millionaire. He also served in the Massachusetts Legislature from 1887 to 1889. In 1892, the Murphy family relocated to New York City, where the flagship store of the business was relocated to Broadway and Murray Streets in Manhattan.

Gerald was raised in Sutton Place, Manhattan attending Blessed Sacrament Academy as a young boy before being sent to the Masters School, a private Catholic boarding school, in Dobbs Ferry, New York. Among his peers there was Dorothy Rothschild. He has been an aesthete since childhood, and was never comfortable in the boardrooms and business clubs, his father was grooming him. He failed the entrance exams at Yale University three times before matricultating, but he ultimately performed respectably well there. He joined Delta Kappa Epsilon and the Skull and Bones society. He befriended a young freshman named Cole Porter who brought him there. Murphy also introduced Porter to his friends, propelling him into writing music for Yale musicals.

== Sara Murphy ==
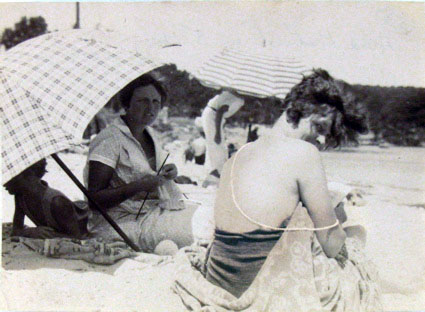
Sara Murphy wearing pearls at Cap d’Antibes beach, 1923

Sara Sherman Wiborg was born in Cincinnati, Ohio, the oldest of three daughters, to Frank Bestow Wiborg, an industrialist and businessman, and Adeline Wiborg (née Sherman; 1859–1917), into an affluent family. Her sisters were Mary Hoyt "Hoytie" Wiborg (1887–1964) and Olga Wiborg Fish (née Wiborg; 1889–1937), who married Sidney Webster Fish, of the Fish family and descendant of Peter Stuyvesant.

Her paternal grandfather was originally from Drammen, Norway and emigrated to the United States between 1840 and 1850, where he married a woman from Upstate New York. Her father, Frank Bestow Wiborg, worked his way through college and became a manufacturing chemist. In 1878, he founded Ault & Wiborg Company, an ink and varnish manufacturer. He became a self-made millionaire by 1905. On her maternal side she was a member of the politically prominent Sherman family of Cincinnati. Her grandfather, Hoyt Sherman, was a banker and served as state legislator. Her great-uncles were Senator John Sherman and General William Tecumseh Sherman.

Her early childhood was spent in Cincinnati attending private schools. As her father concentrated on the European expansion of the business, the family moved permanently to Germany in the 1890s. They were socially accepted into the high society of 20th century Europe. While in Europe, Sara and her sisters Hoytie and Olga sang at high-class assemblies. Upon their return to the U.S., the Wiborg family resided in New York City and later East Hampton. The Wiborg family originally were summer residents there before purchasing property from Mrs. Marshall Smith in the spring of 1909. They ultimately commissioned Grosvenor Atterbury, a prominent architect, to overhaul and extend the property, being able to move in by September. The 30-room mansion known as The Dunes, sat on 600-acres just west of the Maidstone Club, in the area presently known as Wiborg Beach.

== Marriage ==
In 1915, Murphy married Sara Wiborg, five years his senior and a friend since adolescence, in East Hampton in 1915. Both families opposed the match: the Wiborgs objected to his family being “in trade,” and Murphy’s father generally disapproved of his son’s choices. They had three children;

- Honoria Adeline Murphy (1917–1998), married firstly to John Shelton, an English naval officer, and lived in London. She returned to New York City, where she secondly married to Captain William M. Donnelly (1916–1988), with whom she had three children.
- Baoth Wiborg Murphy (1919–1935), who died from meningitis aged 15
- Patrick Francis Murphy II (1920–1937), died of tuberculosis aged 16

The martial home initially was at 50 West 11th Street in Manhattan, New York. In 1921, they decided to move the family to Paris, France, to escape the social structures of New York as well as their families' mutual dissatisfaction with their marriage. There, Gerald started to paint, and they began to make the prominent acquaintances. In 1922, they visited the French Riviera, on the invitation of Cole Porter, and permanently settled there in 1923.

They initially resided at Hôtel du Cap-Eden-Roc after convincing management to remain open throughout the summer. Due to their social prominence they soon became famous and acquainted with celebrities especially Zelda and F. Scott Fitzgerald, Ernest Hemingway, John Dos Passos, Fernand Léger, Jean Cocteau, Pablo Picasso, Archibald MacLeish, John O'Hara, Cole Porter, Dorothy Parker and Robert Benchley.

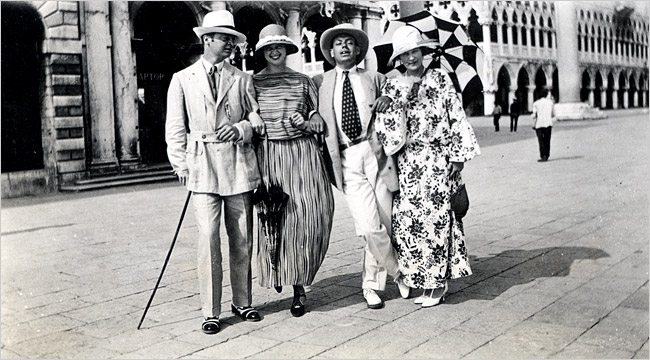
Gerald Murphy, Genevieve Carpenter, Cole Porter and Sara Murphy in Venice, 192

The Murphys eventually purchased a villa in Cap d'Antibes, named it Villa America, and resided there for many years. When the Murphys arrived on the Riviera, lying on the beach merely to enjoy the sun was not a common activity. Occasionally, someone went swimming, but the joys of being at the beach just for the sun were still unknown at the time. The Murphys, with their long forays and picnics at La Garoupe, introduced sunbathing on the beach as a fashionable activity.

They ultimately returned to New York City after his death. Gerald served as president of Mark Cross Company from 1934 to 1956 and stopped painting entirely. Sara ultimately settled in Saranac Lake, New York, where she nursed Patrick and Baoth and Honoria were put in boarding schools. In 1935, Baoth died unexpectedly of meningitis as a complication of measles, and Patrick succumbed to tuberculosis in 1937. Later, they relocated to The Dunes, the 600-acre estate built by Sara's father in 1909, in East Hampton. By 1941, the house proved to be impossible to rent, sell or even maintain, so they ultimately had it demolished and moved to the renovated dairy barn.

== Death ==
Gerald Murphy died on October 17, 1964 in East Hampton, New York aged 76, two days after his friend Cole Porter. In their later years the family lived still comfortably but on largely reduced means. Sara Murphy died on October 10, 1975 in Arlington, Virginia, aged 91.

== Legacy ==
Nicole and Dick Diver of Tender Is the Night by F. Scott Fitzgerald are widely recognized as having been based on the Murphys, mainly from the marked physical similarities, although many of their friends, as well as the Murphys themselves, saw as much or more of Zelda and Scott Fitzgerald's relationship and personalities in the couple than those of the Murphys. Ernest Hemingway's couple in The Garden of Eden is not explicitly based on this pair, but given the similarities of the setting (Nice) and of the type of social group portrayed, there is clearly some basis for such an assumption. Guests of the Murphys often swam at Eden Roc, an event emulated in Hemingway's narrative.

Archibald MacLeish based the main characters in his play J.B. on Gerald and Sara Murphy.

Calvin Tomkins's biography of Gerald and Sara Murphy, Living Well Is the Best Revenge, originally appeared in The New Yorker in 1962 and was published in book form in 1971. Amanda Vaill documented their lives in the 1995 book Everybody Was So Young.

In 1982, Honoria Murphy Donnelly, the Murphys' daughter, wrote (with Richard N. Billings) Sara & Gerald: Villa America and After.

On July 12, 2007, a play by Crispin Whittell titled Villa America, based entirely on the relationships between Sara and Gerald Murphy and their friends, had its world premiere at the Williamstown Theatre Festival with Jennifer Mudge playing Sara Murphy.

=== Paintings by Gerald Murphy ===
Gerald only painted from 1921 until 1929; he is known for his hard-edged still life paintings in a Precisionist, Cubist style. During the 1920s Gerald Murphy, along with other American modernist painters in Europe, notably Charles Demuth and Stuart Davis, created paintings that prefigured the pop art movement, containing pop culture imagery such as mundane objects culled from American commercial products and advertising design.

- Razor, 1924
- Watch, 1925
- Cocktail, 1927
- Wasp and Pear, 1929

Gerald Murphy’s jazz-rhythmed painting titled Razor (1924) and the 6-by-6-foot Watch (1925) are part of the Dallas Museum’s permanent collection and are two of eight remaining paintings in Murphy’s 14-work oeuvre.

=== Paintings of Sara Murphy by Picasso ===
Pablo Picasso, a friend of Sara, painted her in several of his 1923 works:

- Femme assise les bras croisés
- Portrait de Sarah Murphy
- Buste de Femme (Sara Murphy)
- Femme assise en bleu et rose
- Woman Seated in an Armchair

=== Archives ===
The Sara and Gerald Murphy Papers are held at the Beinecke Rare Book and Manuscript Library at Yale University. Some Mark Cross Company objects are located at the Metropolitan Museum of Art.
