= Bud Lathrop =

American high school basketball coach

Personal information
- Born: April 22, 1936
- Died: July 12, 2018 (aged 82) Kansas City, Missouri

Career information
- High school: Raytown High School (Kansas City, Missouri)
- College: William Jewell (1954-1958)
- Coaching career: 1958–2006

Career history

Coaching
- 1958–1960: Mound City HS
- 1960–1961: Fulton HS
- 1961–2006: Raytown South HS

Warren "Bud" Lathrop (April 22, 1936 – July 12, 2018) was an American high school basketball coach in Missouri. With 955 wins, he ranked seventh in total wins in the history of high school boys basketball in the United States at the time of his retirement.

== Early life ==
Lathrop attended Raytown Senior High School where he graduated in 1954. He attended William Jewell College from 1954 to 1959 and lettered in both cross country and basketball. He won three MCAU Championship and left the team as its all-time leader in scoring with 1709 points. He graduated in 1958 with a coaching and teaching degree. In 2001 he was inducted into the school's hall of fame.

== Coaching career ==
He began his coaching career in 1958 with two season in Mound City, Missouri, followed by one season in Fulton, Missouri. In 1961, he returned to his hometown of Raytown, Missouri, and was named head coach at the new Raytown South High School.

While at Raytown South, his Cardinals won four state championships, made the state final four 10 times, and won 35 conference titles.

In 2002, Lathrop was inducted in the Missouri Sports Hall of Fame. In 2003, he was suspended after it was reported that he used a wooden paddle to swat players as a part of a free-throw drill. In 2004, Lathrop was suspended again, this time for language at practice. He retired from coaching in 2006.

He returned to coaching in 2014, coaching the East Christian Academy on part-time basis.

== Death ==
Lathrop started kidney dialysis in 2014. He died at his home on July 12, 2018, at the age of 82.
