= Dominique Morrison =

American professional basketball player (born 1989)

Centauros de Portuguesa
- Position: Shooting guard / small forward
- League: Venezuelan SuperLiga

Personal information
- Born: November 29, 1989 (age 36) Kansas City, Missouri, U.S.
- Listed height: 6 ft 6 in (1.98 m)
- Listed weight: 213 lb (97 kg)

Career information
- High school: Raytown (Raytown, Missouri)
- College: Oral Roberts (2008–2012)
- NBA draft: 2012: undrafted
- Playing career: 2012–present

Career history
- 2012–2013: Iowa Energy
- 2013: Ilysiakos
- 2014: US Heffington
- 2014–2015: Norrköping Dolphins
- 2015–2016: Liège Basket
- 2016–2017: TED Ankara Kolejliler
- 2017–2018: Rethymno Cretan Kings
- 2018–2019: Club Hispano
- 2019–2021: Club Nacional de Football
- 2021: Plateros de Fresnillo
- 2022–present: Centauros de Portuguesa
- Ateans
- Caribbean Storm

Career highlights
- Summit League Player of the Year (2012); 3× First-team All-Summit League (2010–2012); AP Honorable Mention All-American (2012)

Dominique Montel Morrison (born November 29, 1989) is an American professional basketball player for the Centauros de Portuguesa of the Venezuelan SuperLiga. As a college player, he was the 2012 Summit League player of the year and an Associated Press All-American in 2012.

== College career ==
Morrison, a 6'6" forward from Raytown High School in Kansas City, Missouri, played collegiately at Oral Roberts. There he was a four-year starter for the Golden Eagles, leading the team in scoring for his final three years. He was also named first team all-conference for three consecutive years, and the Summit League player of the year as a senior. He was also named an honorable mention All-American by the Associated Press. For his career, Morrison scored 2,080 points (16.1 points per game).

== Professional career ==
Morrison was part of the New Orleans Hornets' pre-season roster but did not make the final cut. Morrison then joined the Iowa Energy. In January 2013, he was waived by the Energy.

On June 4, 2015, he signed with Liège Basket of the Belgian League. For the 2016–17 season, he joined TED Ankara Kolejliler in Turkey.

On December 19, 2017, Morrison signed with Greek club Rethymno Cretan Kings for the rest of the 2017–18 Greek Basket League season. He was released from the Greek club on March 2, 2018.

On December 28, 2018, Morrison signed with Club Hispano of the Argentine Liga Nacional.

On February 4, 2020, Morrison signed with Nacional of the Liga Uruguaya de Basketball (LUB) and the BCL Americas. On February 3, 2022, Morrison scored a season-high 42 points in a BCL Americas win over Minas.
