= Jabril Cox =

American football player (born 1998)

Profile
- Position: Linebacker

Personal information
- Born: April 16, 1998 (age 28); Kansas City, Missouri, U.S.
- Listed height: 6 ft 3 in (1.91 m)
- Listed weight: 235 lb (107 kg)

Career information
- High school: Raytown South (Raytown, Missouri)
- College: North Dakota State (2016–2019); LSU (2020)
- NFL draft: 2021: 4th round, 115th overall pick

Career history
- Dallas Cowboys (2021–2022); Washington Commanders (2023); Minnesota Vikings (2024)*; Dallas Renegades (2025)*
- * Offseason or practice squad member only

Awards and highlights
- 3× FCS national champion (2017, 2018, 2019); 2× FCS All-American; MVFC Defensive Player of the Year (2018); MVFC Freshman of the Year (2017); 2× first-team All-MVFC (2018, 2019); Second-team All-MVFC (2017)

Career NFL statistics
- Total tackles: 10
- Stats at Pro Football Reference

Jabril Cox (born April 16, 1998) is an American professional football linebacker. He was selected by the Dallas Cowboys in the fourth round of the 2021 NFL draft. He played college football for the North Dakota State Bison, where he won three FCS championships and was named the MVFC defensive player of the year before playing the 2020 season with LSU. Cox has also been a member of the Washington Commanders.

== Early life ==
Cox grew up in Kansas City, Missouri and attended Raytown South High School. As a sophomore, he was a two-way starter at linebacker and wide receiver, tallying 101 tackles (13 tackles for loss), 509 receiving yards and 9 touchdowns, while receiving All-conference honors on defense.

As a junior, he was named the starter as a dual-threat quarterback, posting 1,300 passing yards, 17 passing touchdowns and 830 rushing yards, while earning All-district and All-conference honors. He suffered a torn ACL injury during the season.

As a senior, he posted 2,103 passing yards, 18 passing touchdowns, 1,004 rushing yards and 13 rushing touchdowns. During his career he also played as a safety and cornerback. He was a four-year starter for the basketball and baseball teams.

== College career ==
Cox accepted a football scholarship from North Dakota State University. As a redshirt freshman, he was converted into a linebacker. He appeared in all 15 games with 8 starts, registering 75 tackles (led the team), 13 tackles for loss (led the team), 4.5 sacks, 6 quarterback hurries, 3 pass breakups and 3 fumble recoveries. In the sixth game against Youngstown State University, he replaced an injured Chris Board and had 3 sacks. He made 13 tackles (7 solo) in the semifinal 55–13 win over Sam Houston State University. He was named second-team All-Missouri Valley Football Conference (MVFC) and the conference Newcomer of the Year.

As a sophomore, he was named the conference Defensive Player of the Year and first-team All-MVFC, after recording 15 starts, 91 total tackles (led the team), 9.5 tackles for loss, 4 sacks, 7 quarterback hurries and 4 interceptions, two of which he returned for touchdowns. He had 10 tackles in the FCS second round playoff 52–10 win over Montana State University.

As a junior, he started 15 games, making 92 tackles (led the team), 57 solo tackles (second in school history), 9.5 tackles for loss, 5.5 sacks, 5 quarterback hurries, one interception and 6 pass breakups. He missed the eleventh game against the University of South Dakota with an injury. He had 8 tackles in the quarterfinal 9–3 win over Illinois State University and in the championship 28–20 win over James Madison University. He was named first-team All-MVFC for a second straight season, as well as a third-team All-American by the Associated Press. He finished the season fourth in school history with 158 career solo tackles and fifth with 190 career interception return yards. He contributed to his team winning three straight FCS Championships and having a 45–1 overall record. He finished his career with the Bisons with 38 starts in 45 games, 258 tackles (32 tackles for loss), 14 sacks, 6 interceptions and scored two defensive touchdowns. It was reported in the media, that he played the last part of the season with a torn labrum that required surgery in the offseason.

In 2020, he moved on to Louisiana State University as a graduate transfer, looking to improve as a player. He was one of the few bright spots on a team that struggled to a 5–5 overall record, after winning the CFP Championship the previous season. He collected 58 tackles (third on the team), 6.5 tackles for loss, one sack, one fumble recovery, 8 pass breakups and 3 interceptions (one returned for a 14-yard touchdown). He had a sack and returned an interception 14 yards for a touchdown in the season opening 34–44 loss against Mississippi State University. He had 9 tackles against the University of Alabama. Following the season, Cox announced he would enter the 2021 NFL draft.

== Professional career ==
Pre-draft measurables
Height	Weight	Arm length	Hand span
6 ft 3 1/4 in (1.91 m)	232 lb (105 kg)	32 3/8 in (0.82 m)	9 in (0.23 m)
All values from Pro Day

=== Dallas Cowboys ===
Cox was selected by the Dallas Cowboys in the fourth round (115th overall) of the 2021 NFL draft. He signed his rookie contract on May 20, 2021. During a Week 8 game against the Minnesota Vikings, Cox suffered a right knee injury in the third quarter while covering a punt. On November 1, 2021, the MRI revealed Cox suffered a torn ACL. Cox was subsequently placed on the season-ending injured reserve. He appeared in 7 games, making one defensive tackle and one special teams tackle.

In 2022, he returned to action in Week 3 against the New York Giants. He was passed on the depth chart by rookie and former LSU teammate Damone Clark and played mostly on special teams, making 4 tackles in 9 games. He played his most defensive snaps in the season finale against the Tennessee Titans. He was declared inactive in 8 regular season games and in the 2 playoff contests. It has been speculated in the media, that he never fully recovered from his ACL injury.

In the 2023, preseason, he was part of a deep defensive unit and wasn't able to earn a roster spot. He was waived on August 29, 2023.

=== Washington Commanders ===
Cox signed with the practice squad of the Washington Commanders on August 31, 2023. He was signed to the active roster on November 3, 2023. He appeared in 10 games and tallied two special teams tackles. He was not re-signed after the season.

=== Minnesota Vikings ===
On July 25, 2024, Cox signed with the Minnesota Vikings. He suffered a groin injury in the first preseason game against the Las Vegas Raiders. He was waived with an injury designation on August 13.

=== Arlington Renegades ===
On January 7, 2024, Cox signed with the Arlington Renegades of the United Football League (UFL). He was released on March 19, 2025.
