= Raytown South High School =

Raytown South Senior High School

Location
- 8211 Sterling; Raytown, MO 64138; 38°58′23″N 94°26′58″W

Information
- Type: Public
- Established: 1961
- School district: Raytown C-2 School District
- Principal: Shunton Hammond
- Faculty: Lori Flaherty (activities); Dr. Earl Donalson
- Teaching staff: 63.84 (FTE)
- Enrollment: 1,179 (2023–2024)
- Student to teacher ratio: 18.47
- Colors: Red and White
- Mascot: Cardinal
- Yearbook: Polaris (1966-1986); Putting the Pieces Back Together (1993); Take a Closer Look (1996); All (1997); By Invitation Only (1999); Polaris (2000-2001)
- Information: (816) 268-7330
- Website: Raytown South H.S.
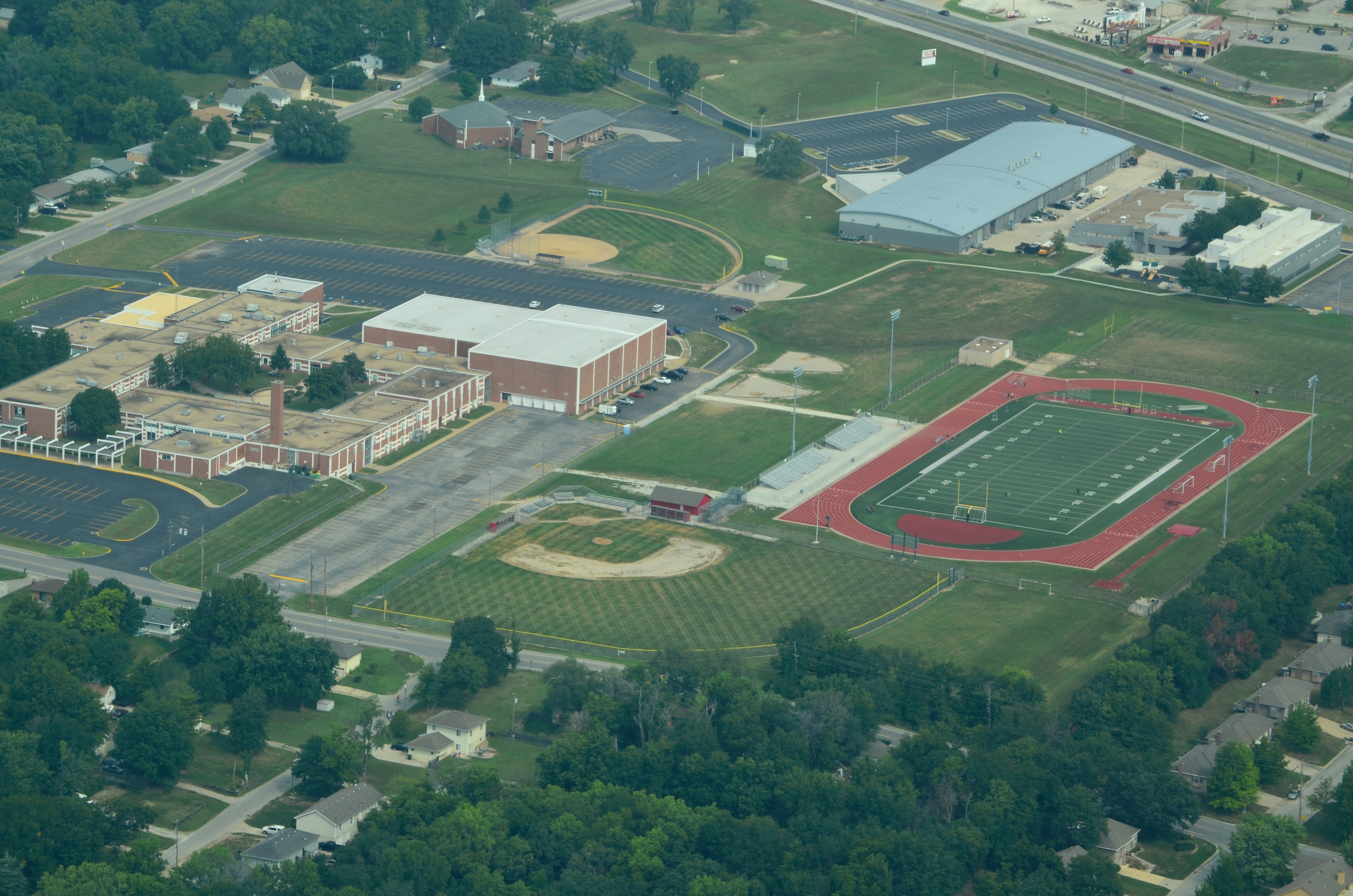
- Aerial view

Raytown South Senior High School is a high school located in Raytown, Missouri. The school was established in 1961, and graduated its first class of seniors in 1964. As Raytown became less of a "destination-suburb" in the 1990s, the enrollment fell drastically.

== Extracurricular activities ==
=== Debate ===
The forensics program has had several national champions in various styles of debate, public forum, expository speaking and poetry reading.

=== Choir ===
From 1984-2009, the choir program saw several dozen student attain All-State status. The choir program performed throughout Kansas City, including Crown Center, Arrowhead Stadium and Royals Stadium. Every May, thousands came to an annual variety show called Southern Comfort. In November 2005, the choir sang at Carnegie Hall along with several other show choirs from across the country.

=== Athletics ===
==== Boys basketball ====
From the inception of the school until March 2006, the program was under the direction of the legendary Bud Lathrop. His career record was 955-300, going 924-267 at South. As of his retirement, Lathrop was ranked No. 7 all-time in high school career coaching victories in the United States. He also went to the Final Four six other times in 1974, 1975, 1985, 1992, 1993, 2003.

Lathrop his teams to the state playoffs 23 times and won 35 conference championships. A total of 254 of Lathrop's former players went on to play college basketball at various levels. Lathrop was inducted into the Missouri Sports Hall of Fame in 2002.

Lathrop's teams won Missouri state titles in:

- 1970 - Squad went 27-1 led by Randy Culberson 6'2"
- 1972 - Led by John Harrison 6'5" and Ed Stoll 6'6"
- 1977 - led by the F-Troop, better known as Bill Fennelly, Kevin Fromm and Larry Frevert
- 1990 - Went 31-0 and were led by Jevon Crudup

==== Boys golf ====
The Raytown South boys golf team have qualified for the Missouri State Championship as a team eight times (1964, 1965, 1970, 1976, 1980, 1982, 1985, 2002).

In 1976, Doug Maddox won the individual state championship with a 136 total score (68-66) at Grandview Golf Course in Springfield, Missouri.

== Notable alumni ==
- Stan Wall (Class of 1968) - former MLB player for Los Angeles Dodgers
- Bob Dernier (Class of 1975) - former MLB player for the Chicago Cubs
- Limbo Parks (Class of 1983) - former NFL player
- Mara Brock Akil (Class of 1988) - writer and television producer
- Jason Belser (Class of 1988) - played football at the University of Oklahoma and had a long NFL career with the Indianapolis Colts and Kansas City Chiefs
- John D. Carmack (Class of 1988) - co-founder of id Software
- Jevon Crudup (Class of 1990) - played basketball at the University of Missouri and was drafted 48th overall by the Detroit Pistons in the 1994 NBA draft
- Kara Brock (Class of 1991) - television and film actress
- Maurice Mitchell (Class of 2008) - ran track at Florida State University and was a qualifier for the 2012 Summer Olympics in the 200 meters
- Ish Wainright (Class of 2013) - NBA player, player for Hapoel Tel Aviv of the Israeli Basketball Premier League
- Jabril Cox (Class of 2016) - former NFL player
- Quincy Hall (Class of 2016) - World Champion professional sprinter
- Elijah Childs (Class of 2017) - basketball player in the Israeli Basketball Premier League

== Notable former staff ==
- Jevon Crudup - former coach, played basketball at the University of Missouri and was drafted 48th overall by the Detroit Pistons in the 1994 NBA draft
- Bud Lathrop, one of the winningest head coaches in high school basketball history, inducted into the Missouri Sports Hall of Fame in 2002
