= Roger Allen III =

American football player (born 1986)

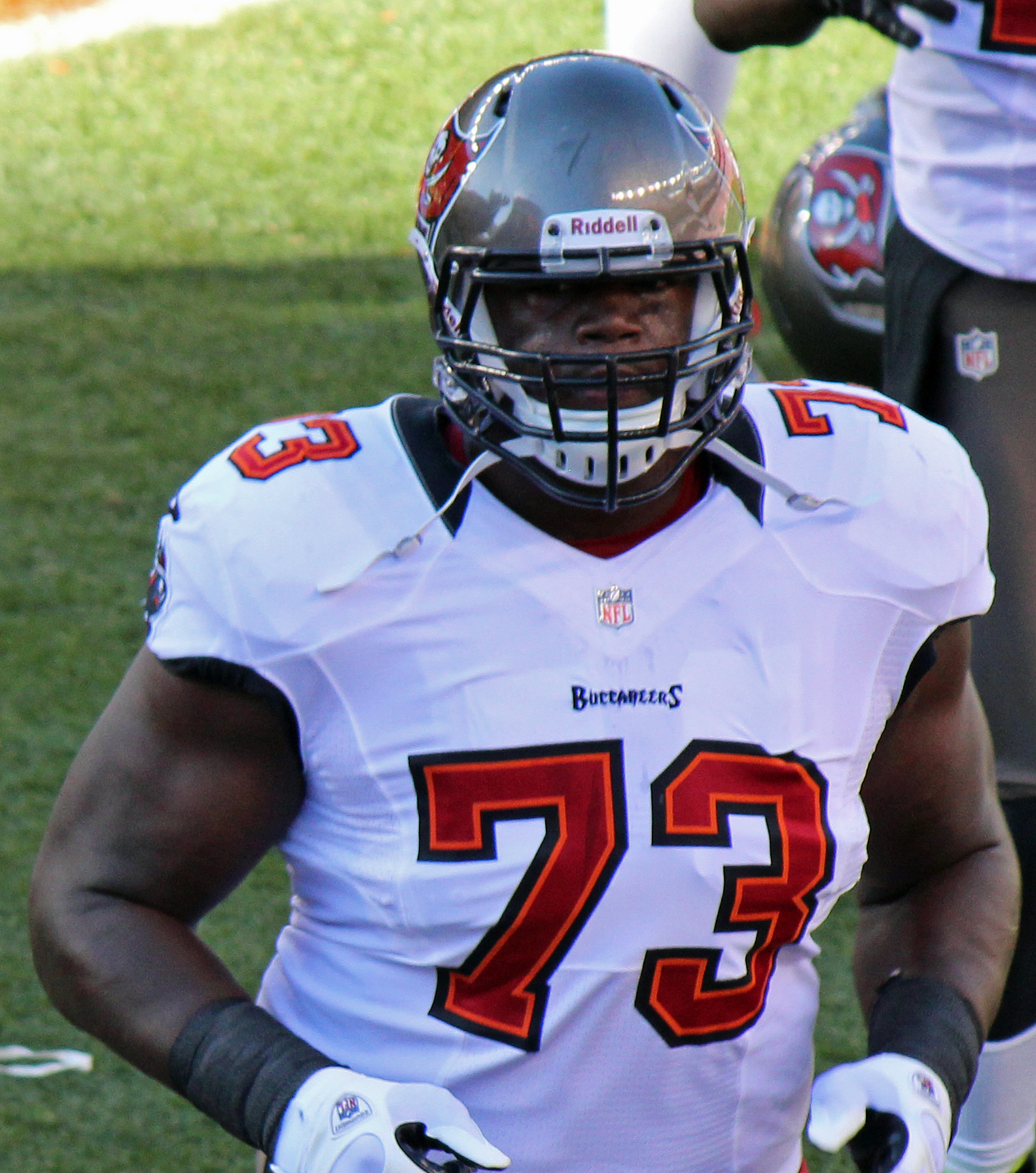
- Allen in the 2012 NFL season

No. 70, 66, 73
- Position: Guard

Personal information
- Born: February 10, 1986 (age 40); Raytown, Missouri, U.S.
- Listed height: 6 ft 3 in (1.91 m)
- Listed weight: 325 lb (147 kg)

Career information
- High school: Raytown
- College: Missouri Western State
- NFL draft: 2009: undrafted

Career history
- St. Louis Rams (2009); New Orleans Saints (2010−2011)*; Carolina Panthers (2011–2012)*; Tampa Bay Buccaneers (2012)
- * Offseason or practice squad member only

Awards and highlights
- 2× Little All-America (2006, 2008); 3× All-MAIA (2006, 2007, 2008)

Career NFL statistics
- Games played: 6
- Games started: 1
- Stats at Pro Football Reference

Roger Allen III (born February 10, 1986) is an American former professional football player who was a guard in the National Football League (NFL). He played college football for the Missouri Western Griffons.

== Early life ==
Roger Allen attended Raytown High School in Raytown, Missouri and was earned All-Metro and All-Conference honors.

== College career ==
Allen started all 48 games (34 at right guard, 11 at left guard, three at right tackle), as the team compiled a 33-15 record during his four seasons at Missouri Western. Over four seasons Allen graded 86.8% for blocking consistency, registered 386 knockdowns, allowed just four sacks and three pressures, while only committing seven penalties while seeing action during 1,309 pass plays during his tenure with the Griffons. Allen was a First-team Freshman All-American selection in 2005 after starting all 12 games at both offensive guard spots. He was penalized three times and gave up just 1.5 quarterback sacks and no pressures all season. In 2006, he was First-team All-Mid-America Intercollegiate Athletics Association as he started all 12 games at right offensive guard. He allowed just 1.5 quarterback sacks and no pressures. In 2006 Allen was a Little All-American choice by The NFL Draft Report and a First-team All-MAIA Association selection for the second straight season. In 2007, Allen was penalized once, allowing only one quarterback pressure and no sacks on 329 pass plays.

As a senior, in 2008, Allen was a First-team Little All-American and All-Mid-America Intercollegiate Athletics Association selection by the AFCA and AP. He allowed just one quarterback sack and two pressures, accruing just two penalties on the season.

== Professional career ==
=== Pre-draft ===
Pre-draft measurables
Height	Weight	Arm length	Hand span	40-yard dash	10-yard split	20-yard split	20-yard shuttle	Three-cone drill	Vertical jump	Broad jump	Bench press
6 ft 2 3/4 in (1.90 m)	326 lb (148 kg)	34 3/4 in (0.88 m)	10 in (0.25 m)	5.25 s	1.75 s	2.98 s	4.80 s	8.30 s	26 1/2 in (0.67 m)	7 ft 9 in (2.36 m)	38 reps
All values from Pro Day.

=== St. Louis Rams ===
On April 27, 2009, Allen was signed by the St. Louis Rams as an undrafted free agent. His deal is a reported three-year $1.2 million contract that included a $20,000 signing bonus. He made the 53 man roster and played in the last two games of the season, starting in the final one. He was released in the final cuts of the 2010 training camp.

=== New Orleans Saints ===
He was signed to the Saints practice squad in the 2010 season. He was waived by the New Orleans Saints on September 5, 2011 due to an early preseason injury.

=== Tampa Bay Buccaneers ===
He was signed to the Buccaneers practice squad for 2012. On October 30, Allen was promoted to the active roster. He was released on May 6, 2013. On July 31, 2013, Allen was re-signed by the Tampa Bay Buccaneers.
