= Aldon Smith =

American football player (1989–2026)

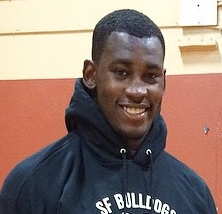
- Smith in 2014

No. 99, 58
- Position: Defensive end

Personal information
- Born: September 25, 1989; Greenwood, Mississippi, U.S.
- Died: June 13, 2026 (aged 36); San Jose, California, U.S.
- Listed height: 6 ft 4 in (1.93 m)
- Listed weight: 255 lb (116 kg)

Career information
- High school: Raytown (Raytown, Missouri)
- College: Missouri (2008–2010)
- NFL draft: 2011: 1st round, 7th overall pick

Career history
- San Francisco 49ers (2011–2014); Oakland Raiders (2015–2017); Dallas Cowboys (2020); Seattle Seahawks (2021)*
- * Offseason or practice squad member only

Awards and highlights
- First-team All-Pro (2012); Pro Bowl (2012); PFWA All-Rookie Team (2011); First-team All-Big 12 (2010); Big 12 Defensive Freshman of the Year (2009)

Career NFL statistics
- Total tackles: 228
- Sacks: 52.5
- Interceptions: 1
- Forced fumbles: 5
- Fumble recoveries: 3
- Pass deflections: 10
- Defensive touchdowns: 1
- Stats at Pro Football Reference

Aldon Jacarus Ramon Smith (September 25, 1989 – June 13, 2026) was an American professional football player who was an outside linebacker and defensive end for six seasons in the National Football League (NFL). He played college football for the Missouri Tigers and was selected by the San Francisco 49ers with the seventh overall pick in the 2011 NFL draft. Smith was a first-team All-Pro and a Pro Bowl selection with the 49ers in 2012. He was also a member of the Oakland Raiders, Dallas Cowboys, and Seattle Seahawks.

== Early life ==
Aldon Jacarus Ramon Smith was born on September 25, 1989, in Greenwood, Mississippi. He attended Raytown High School in Raytown, Missouri, where he played for the Raytown Bluejays high school football team. As a senior, Smith recorded 60 tackles, 21 tackles for loss, and 12 sacks, while adding seven forced fumbles, a blocked punt, and a safety on defense. On offense, he had 34 receptions for 570 yards and four touchdowns as a tight end.

Considered only a three-star recruit by the Rivals.com (now just known as Rivals) recruiting network, Smith was considered the No. 5 overall prospect (any position) in the state of Missouri as well as the No. 27 strongside defensive end in the nation. He chose Mizzou over Nebraska, Kansas, and Kansas State, among others.

College recruiting
Name	Hometown	School	Height	Weight	40^{‡}	Commit date
Aldon Smith; DE	Raytown, Missouri	Raytown	6 ft 4 in (1.93 m)	235 lb (107 kg)	4.68	Jul 8, 2007
Aldon Smith; DE	Recruit ratings: Scout: Rivals: 247Sports:					
Overall recruit ranking: Scout: 24 Rivals: 27 (SDE) 247Sports: 34 (SDE)
‡ Refers to 40-yard dash; Note: In many cases, Scout, Rivals, 247Sports, On3, and ESPN may conflict in their listings of height, weight and 40 time.; In these cases, the average was taken. ESPN grades are on a 100-point scale.; Sources: "2007 Team Ranking". Rivals.com.

== College career ==
Smith played for the Missouri Tigers football team under head coach Gary Pinkel while attending the University of Missouri from 2008 to 2010. After being redshirted as a freshman in 2008, Smith started 11 of 13 games at defensive end in 2009. He finished the season with 60 tackles and 11 sacks. Smith was named the Big 12 Defensive Freshman of the Year and a first-team Freshman All-American. As a sophomore in 2010, he played in nine games, recording 48 tackles and six sacks.

After the season, Smith announced that he would forgo his final two years of eligibility and enter the 2011 NFL draft.

=== College awards and honors ===
- 2009 First-team Freshman All-American (College Football News, Phil Steele)
- 2009 Big 12 Defensive Newcomer of the Year (Associated Press)
- 2009 Big 12 Defensive Freshman of the Year (Coaches)
- 2009 Hendricks Award Watch List
- 2009 Second-team All-Big 12 (Associated Press)
- 2009 Honorable mention All-Big 12 (Coaches)
- 2009 Team Defensive Lineman of the Year Award
- 2009 Team Freshman of the Year Award

== Professional career ==
=== Pre-draft ===
Playing as a defensive end at Missouri, Smith was considered a "DE/OLB prospect" by most NFL scouts and was considered a strong edge run defender as 4–3 end or 3–4 linebacker. Many scouts compared him to DeMarcus Ware. Prior to the 2011 NFL draft, Smith was projected to be selected in the mid-late first round by mock draft analysis.

Pre-draft measurables
Height	Weight	Arm length	Hand span	Wingspan	40-yard dash	10-yard split	20-yard split	20-yard shuttle	Three-cone drill	Vertical jump	Broad jump	Bench press	Wonderlic
6 ft 4 1/4 in (1.94 m)	263 lb (119 kg)	35 3/8 in (0.90 m)	9 3/4 in (0.25 m)	6 ft 11 7/8 in (2.13 m)	4.82 s	1.68 s	2.79 s	4.50 s	7.19 s	34.5 in (0.88 m)	9 ft 10 in (3.00 m)	20 reps	18
All values from NFL Combine/Pro Day

=== San Francisco 49ers ===
==== 2011 season ====
The San Francisco 49ers drafted Smith in the first round with the seventh overall pick.

Smith made his NFL debut in the season-opening 33–17 victory over the Seattle Seahawks, recording a pass deflection. Three weeks later against the Philadelphia Eagles, Smith had five combined tackles (four solo) and his first 1.5 sacks on Michael Vick in the narrow 24–23 victory. Over the next two weeks, Smith would win the Pepsi NFL Rookie of the Week in victories against the Tampa Bay Buccaneers and Detroit Lions after recording two sacks in both games. After a strong October, Smith became the first 49ers player since linebacker Patrick Willis in 2007 to earn the NFL Rookie of the Month award; Smith recorded 13 tackles and 6.5 sacks, including one that forced a safety as he helped the 49ers to a 6–1 record.

During a Week 13 26–0 shutout victory over the St. Louis Rams, Smith recorded three solo tackles, two sacks, and a fumble recovery. In the next game against the Arizona Cardinals, he had four solo tackles, a sack, and a forced fumble during the narrow 21–19 loss. The following week against the Pittsburgh Steelers on Monday Night Football, Smith recorded four combined tackles (three solo) and 2.5 sacks in the 20–3 victory. He also surpassed Charles Haley for the 49ers record for most sacks by a rookie in a single season with 13. During Week 16 against the Seahawks, Smith had four combined tackles (three solo) and a sack in the narrow 19–17 road victory.

Smith finished his rookie year with 37 combined tackles (31 solo), 14 sacks, four pass deflections, two forced fumbles, and a fumble recovery in 16 games and no starts. He was half a sack shy of tying the all-time rookie sack record held by defensive end Jevon Kearse despite not starting a single game as a rookie. Smith was named Defensive Rookie of the Year by Pro Football Writers of America, and finished second to Von Miller for the Associated Press NFL Defensive Rookie of the Year Award. Smith was also named to the NFL All-Rookie Team.

The 49ers finished atop the NFC West with a 13–3 record and earned a first-round bye in the playoffs as the #2-seed. In the Divisional Round against the New Orleans Saints, Smith had three solo tackles and a sack during the 36–32 victory. During the NFC Championship Game against the New York Giants, he recorded a solo tackle and a sack in the 20–17 overtime loss.

==== 2012 season ====
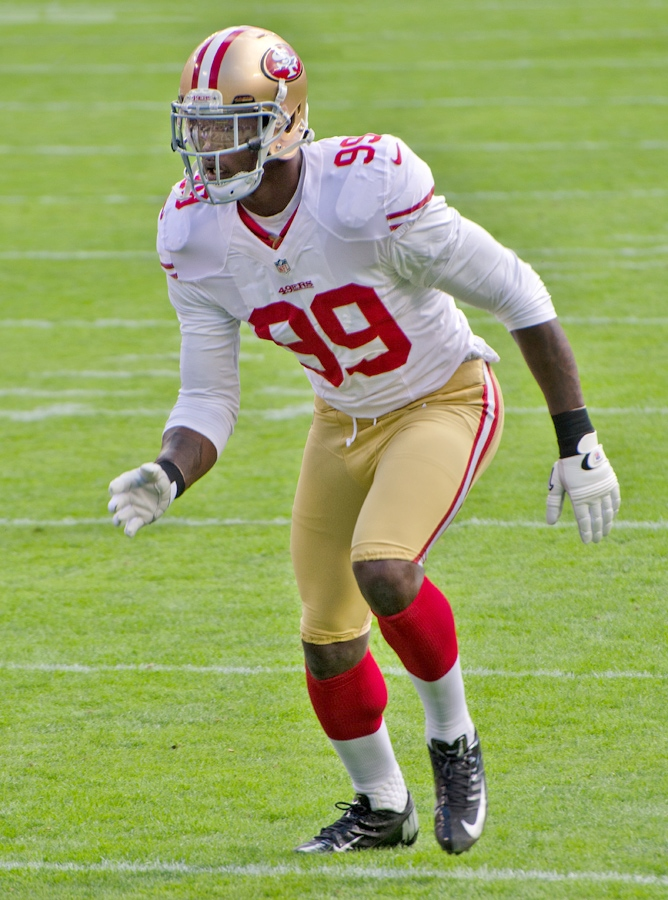
Smith in 2012

After being used only as a situational pass rusher throughout his rookie year, Smith became a full-time starter in 2012.

During the season-opening 30–22 road victory over the Green Bay Packers, Smith had four combined tackles (three solo) and sacked Aaron Rodgers once. In the next game against the Lions, Smith recorded six combined tackles (four solo) and 1.5 sacks during the 27–19 victory. Two weeks later, he had four combined tackles (three solo), two sacks, and a forced fumble as the 49ers shut out the New York Jets on the road by a score of 34–0.

During Week 7 against the Seahawks on Thursday Night Football, Smith recorded four combined tackles (three solo) and a sack in the 13–6 victory. In the next game against the Cardinals on Monday Night Football, he had six solo tackles and sacked John Skelton twice during the 24–3 road victory. Following a Week 9 bye, the 49ers returned home and faced the Rams. Smith finished the 24–24 tie with six solo tackles and two sacks.

During a Week 11 32–7 victory over the Chicago Bears on Monday Night Football, Smith had seven combined tackles (six solo), 5.5 sacks, and two forced fumbles. He was named NFC Defensive Player of the Week due to his spectacular performance. In the next game against the Saints, Smith recorded five combined tackles (four solo) and 1.5 sacks during the 31–21 road victory. With his performance, Smith surpassed Reggie White as the fastest player in league history to record his 30th career sack, doing so in 27 games. Smith was named NFC Defensive Player of the Month for November. The following week against the Rams, he had three combined tackles (two solo) and sacked Sam Bradford once in the 16–13 overtime road loss, breaking another of White's records by recording 31.5 sacks in his first two seasons. In that same game, Smith tied Fred Dean's franchise record of 17.5 sacks in a season.

During Week 14 against the Miami Dolphins, Smith had six combined tackles (five solo) and sacked Ryan Tannehill twice in the 27–13 victory. In the next game against the New England Patriots on Sunday Night Football, Smith recorded a tackle, a pass deflection, and his first NFL interception off of Tom Brady during the 41–34 road victory. Smith was named to the Pro Bowl and earned First Team All-Pro honors.

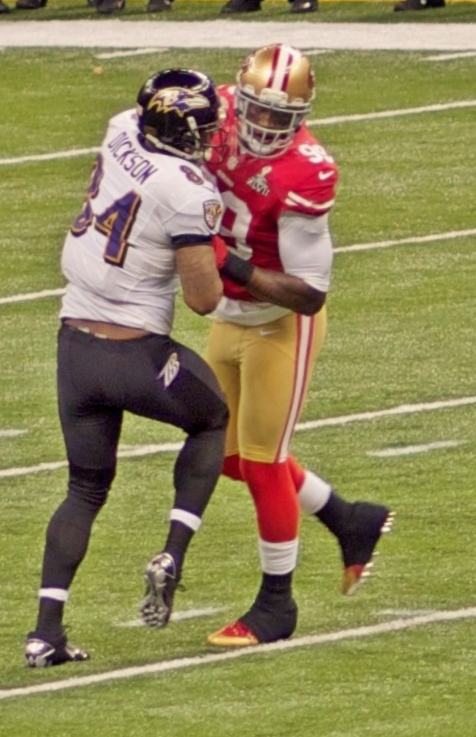
Smith takes on a block by tight end Ed Dickson in Super Bowl XLVII

Smith finished his second professional season with 66 combined tackles (50 solo), 19.5 sacks, three forced fumbles, an interception, and a pass deflection in 16 games and starts. He broke Cedrick Hardman's 49ers franchise record of 18 sacks in a season, which Hardman set in 1971, a 14-game NFL season. The 49ers finished atop the NFC West with an 11–4–1 record and earned a first-round bye in the playoffs as the #2-seed. In the Divisional Round against the Packers, Smith recorded two solo tackles and a forced fumble during the 45–31 victory. During the NFC Championship Game against Atlanta Falcons, he had a solo tackle and a fumble recovery in the 28–24 comeback road victory as the 49ers advanced to Super Bowl XLVII. In the Super Bowl against the Baltimore Ravens, Smith recorded two combined tackles (one solo), but the 49ers fell behind early and could not come back, losing by a score of 34–31.

On the NFL Network's NFL Top 100 Players of 2013 ranking, Smith was ranked as the seventh-best player in the league, making him the second-highest-ever debut and second-highest defensive player on the list, both behind J. J. Watt. Smith was voted the San Francisco 49ers MVP in 2012.

==== 2013 season ====
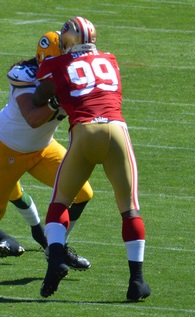
Smith in 2013

Smith got off to a fast start in 2013, recording 18 combined tackles (14 solo) and 4.5 sacks in the first three games. However, on September 20, he was involved in a single-vehicle accident in San Jose, California. Smith was subsequently arrested on suspicion of driving under the influence and possession of marijuana. After a Week 3 27–7 loss to the Indianapolis Colts, Smith voluntarily entered a rehabilitation facility, to be put onto the non-football injury list with an indefinite leave of absence.

Smith missed five games while in rehabilitation. He returned in Week 10 against the Carolina Panthers, but in a backup role. Two weeks later against the Washington Redskins on Monday Night Football, Smith had three combined tackles (two solo) and sacked Robert Griffin III twice in the 27–6 road victory. Smith returned to the starting lineup for the next game against the Rams. During a Week 15 33–14 road victory over the Buccaneers, he recorded four solo tackles and sacked Mike Glennon twice.

Smith finished the 2013 season with 34 combined tackles (29 solo) and 8.5 sacks in 11 games and eight starts. Despite his limited playing time, Smith was ranked 33rd by his fellow players on the NFL Top 100 Players of 2014. The 49ers finished second in the NFC West with a 12–4 record and qualified for the playoffs as the #5-seed. During the Wild Card Round against the Packers, Smith had four combined tackles (two solo) and 1.5 sacks in the 23–20 road victory. In the Divisional Round against the Panthers, he recorded three combined tackles (one solo) during the 23–10 road victory. During the NFC Championship Game against the Seahawks, Smith had four combined tackles (two solo), 2.5 sacks (one was a strip-sack on the opening play), and a fumble recovery in the 23–17 road loss.

==== 2014 season ====
Smith served a nine-game suspension for violating the NFL's substance abuse and personal conduct policies. He was reinstated on November 11. During a Week 12 17–13 victory over the Washington Redskins, Smith recorded three solo tackles and two sacks. He finished the 2014 season with 15 combined tackles (10 solo) and two sacks in seven games and six starts.

On August 7, 2015, following an arrest for his third DUI, Smith was released by the 49ers.

=== Oakland Raiders ===
==== 2015 season ====
On September 11, 2015, Smith signed a one-year contract with the Oakland Raiders.

Smith made his Raiders debut during the season-opening 33–13 loss to the Cincinnati Bengals and recorded two combined tackles (one solo). Two weeks later against the Cleveland Browns, Smith got his first start of the year and finished the 27–20 road victory with two solo tackles and two pass deflections. In the next game against the Chicago Bears, he recorded a season-high six solo tackles, a pass deflection, and his first sack of the year during the narrow 22–20 road loss.

During Week 5 against the Denver Broncos, Smith recorded four combined tackles (one solo) and 0.5 sacks in the 16–10 loss. During a Week 9 38–35 road loss to the Steelers, he had three solo tackles and a sack, which resulted in a foot injury to Ben Roethlisberger. In the next game against the Minnesota Vikings, Smith recorded three solo tackles and a sack during the 30–14 loss in what would prove to be his final game as a Raider.

On November 17, 2015, the NFL issued Smith a one-year suspension due to a hit-and-run incident that occurred the previous August. He finished his first season with the Raiders with 28 combined tackles (seven solo), 3.5 sacks, and three pass deflections in nine games and seven starts.

==== 2016 and 2017 seasons ====
On April 4, 2016, Smith re-signed with the Raiders on a two-year, $11 million contract. On October 27, he applied for reinstatement. However, no reinstatement occurred, resulting in Smith sitting out the entire 2016 and 2017 NFL seasons.

Following an alleged domestic violence incident, the Raiders released Smith on March 5, 2018.

=== Dallas Cowboys ===
On March 14, 2020, it was reported that Smith was "in the process" of applying for reinstatement from an indefinite league suspension. A few weeks later, on April 2, he signed a one-year contract with the Dallas Cowboys after impressing the organization with his conditioning and size (287 pounds (130 kg)). On May 20, Smith was conditionally reinstated by the NFL and was cleared to take part in the Cowboys' virtual offseason program.

During the season-opener against the Los Angeles Rams on Sunday Night Football, Smith played in a regular season game for the first time since November 15, 2015. He finished the 20–17 road loss with a team-high 11 combined tackles (six solo), a sack, and two quarterback hits on Jared Goff. Two weeks later against the Seahawks, Smith sacked Russell Wilson thrice and had four solo tackles (two for a loss), four quarterback hits, and a pass deflection in the 38–31 road loss.

After posting four sacks in the first three games, Smith's production decreased considerably in the following weeks (tallying only one more sack) and he was also limited with a knee injury. Smith's time on the field was reduced in favor of the Cowboys playing defensive end Randy Gregory. During a Week 14 30–7 road victory over the Bengals, Smith recorded three combined tackles (one solo) and recovered a fumble lost by running back Trayveon Williams and returned it 78 yards (fifth longest in franchise history) for his first NFL touchdown.

Smith finished the 2020 season with 48 combined tackles (31 solo), five sacks (second on the team), 35 quarterback pressures (second on the team), two pass deflections, and two fumble recoveries in 16 games and starts.

=== Seattle Seahawks ===
On April 15, 2021, Smith signed a one-year contract with the Seattle Seahawks. He was released on August 11.

=== Retirement ===
Following his release from jail on October 24, 2023, Smith stated that he was "done with (foot)ball".

== NFL career statistics ==
Legend
	Led the league
**Bold**	Career high

=== Regular season ===
Year	Team	Games		Tackles				Interceptions						Fumbles			
Year	Team	GP	GS	Cmb	Solo	Ast	Sck	PD	Int	Yds	Avg	Lng	TD	FF	FR	Yds	TD
2011	SF	**16**	0	37	31	6	14.0	**4**	—	—	—	—	—	2	1	0	0
2012	SF	**16**	**16**	**66**	**50**	16	**19.5**	1	**1**	**6**	**6.0**	**6**	0	**3**	0	0	0
2013	SF	11	8	34	29	5	8.5	0	—	—	—	—	—	—	—	—	—
2014	SF	7	6	15	10	5	2.0	0	—	—	—	—	—	—	—	—	—
2015	OAK	9	7	28	21	7	3.5	3	—	—	—	—	—	—	—	—	—
2016	OAK	0	0	Suspended													
2017	OAK	0	0	Suspended													
2020	DAL	**16**	**16**	48	31	**17**	5.0	2	—	—	—	—	—	0	**2**	**78**	**1**
Career		75	53	228	172	56	52.5	10	1	6	6.0	6	0	5	3	78	1

=== Postseason ===
Year	Team	Games		Tackles				Interceptions						Fumbles			
Year	Team	GP	GS	Cmb	Solo	Ast	Sck	PD	Int	Yds	Avg	Lng	TD	FF	FR	Yds	TD
2011	SF	2	0	4	4	0	2.0	—	—	—	—	—	—	—	—	—	—
2012	SF	**3**	**3**	5	4	1	0.0	—	—	—	—	—	—	**1**	**1**	0	0
2013	SF	**3**	**3**	**11**	**5**	**6**	**3.5**	—	—	—	—	—	—	**1**	**1**	0	0
2016	OAK	0	0	Suspended													
Career		8	6	20	13	7	5.5	0	0	0	0.0	0	0	2	2	0	0

=== NFL records ===
- Fastest player in league history to record his 30th career sack: 27 games
- Most sacks in a player's first two seasons: 33.5

==== 49ers franchise records ====
- Most sacks in a single season by a rookie: 14.0
- Most sacks in a single season: 19.5

== Legal issues ==
=== 2012 ===
On January 28, 2012, Smith was arrested for driving under the influence in Miami Beach, Florida.

On June 30, Smith was believed to have suffered stab wounds at a party at his residence near San Jose. Two other people were shot in the incident. On October 9, 2013, Smith was charged with "three felony counts of illegal possession of an assault weapon" relating to the stabbing incident. The charges were later reduced to misdemeanors.

=== 2013 ===
On September 20, 2013, Smith was involved in a single-vehicle accident in San Jose, California. He was subsequently arrested on suspicion of driving under the influence and possession of marijuana. After a Week 3 27–7 loss to the Indianapolis Colts, Smith voluntarily entered a rehabilitation facility, to be put onto the non-football injury list with an indefinite leave of absence.

=== 2014 ===
On April 13, 2014, Smith was detained and arrested following an incident at the Los Angeles International Airport where he became belligerent and uncooperative with a TSA agent, who alleged Smith claimed that he was carrying a bomb. After interviews revealed that Smith did not clearly state that he was carrying a bomb, the Los Angeles City Attorney decided to drop the charges. Smith was suspended for nine games in the 2014 season.

=== 2015 ===
On August 6, 2015, Smith was arrested in Santa Clara, California, for an alleged hit and run after driving under the influence, and vandalism charges. He was released by the 49ers the next day as a result.

=== 2017 ===
On March 9, 2017, Smith was a passenger with a friend driving to Smith's house at 12:00 a.m., when the San Francisco Police Department found out both Smith and the driver were under the influence after hitting a police car. Even though Smith was not the driver, both Smith and his friend were detained by the San Francisco Police Department for questioning. The next day, Smith and his friend were released and no arrests were made.

On September 23, 2017, it was announced that Smith had agreed to plead no contest to hit and run in the 2015 incident in exchange for the DUI charges being dropped. He was sentenced to 20 days in jail. During his sentence, Smith was ordered to attend a treatment facility and undergo anger management training classes. After his release, Smith was prohibited from entering any bars or other establishments where alcohol is the primary commodity being sold.

=== 2018 ===
On March 3, 2018, a woman called the police from Smith's home and reported that he had consumed multiple bottles of tequila and then bit her wrists. Smith reportedly fled the home before police arrived. He was released by the Raiders two days later as a result.

On March 23, Smith was arrested for violation of a court order, where he was ordered to stay away from a woman he assaulted earlier in the month. The woman was revealed to be Smith's fiancée. This picked up from the previous incident that occurred on March 3, where Smith pleaded not guilty on four misdemeanor counts, including: domestic violence, assault with force likely to produce great bodily injury, false imprisonment, and vandalism. On April 8, he was arrested for violations of conditions to his bail.

=== 2019 ===
On June 11, 2019, Smith was stopped by police in Mission, Kansas, for a traffic violation, and later arrested on suspicion of driving under the influence.

=== 2021 ===
On April 19, 2021, the St. Bernard Parish, Louisiana Sheriff's Office issued an arrest warrant for Smith for second-degree battery. Smith surrendered two days later and was released on a $25,000 bond with an arraignment scheduled for July 14.

On December 7, Smith was arrested for driving under the influence in San Mateo County, California. On April 7, 2023, he was sentenced to a year in jail after pleading no contest to a felony charge stemming from this incident.

== Death ==
On June 13, 2026, Smith was found unresponsive in a friend's vehicle shortly after the two had delivered food to a local homeless charity. He was pronounced dead later that day at age 36 at Good Samaritan Hospital in San Jose, California.
