= Jevon Crudup =

American basketball player and coach

Personal information
- Born: April 27, 1972 (age 54)
- Listed height: 6 ft 9 in (2.06 m)

Career information
- High school: Raytown South (Raytown, Missouri)
- College: Missouri (1990–1994)
- NBA draft: 1994: 2nd round, 48th overall pick
- Drafted by: Detroit Pistons
- Position: Forward

Career highlights
- Fourth-team Parade All-American (1990); Mr. Show-Me Basketball (1990)
- Stats at Basketball Reference

Jevon Crudup (born April 27, 1972) is an American former professional basketball player and coach. After playing college basketball at the University of Missouri, Crudup was drafted by the Detroit Pistons in the 1994 NBA draft. During his senior year, Crudup helped lead Missouri to the Elite Eight, tying the school's deepest NCAA Tournament run ever. However, shortly after that season, Missouri discovered that Crudup had accepted thousands of dollars in inducements from a middleman working for agents hoping to sign Crudup if he was selected in the 1994 NBA draft. Missouri didn't dispute that Crudup had received the payments, but contended that it didn't know about them. In 1996, the NCAA largely exonerated Missouri, but forced the Tigers to vacate their 1994 NCAA Tournament appearance.

He coached at his alma mater, Raytown South High School, and in 2006, won a wrongful termination judgement in a discrimination lawsuit against the school after he was fired over a post-game incident.
