= James Chappell =

James Chappell may refer to:

- James Chappell (astronomer)
- James Chappell (servant)
- Jimmy Chappell, ice hockey player
- Jim Chappell, American pianist
- Jim Chappell (businessman), American restaurateur
