= Marty Prather =

Hall of Fame American professional fan (born 1958)

Marty "The Sign Man" Prather
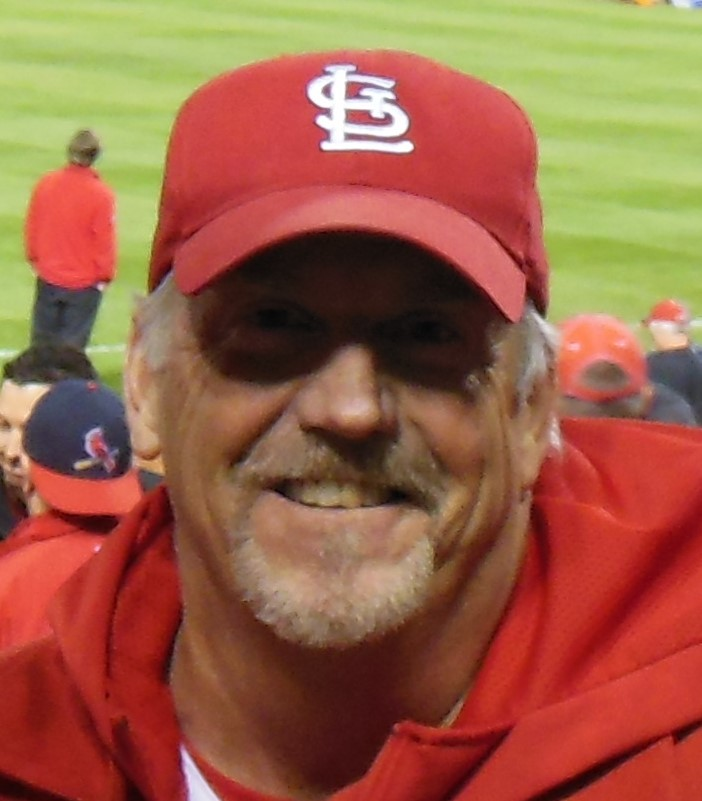
- Prather at Busch Stadium in St. Louis, MO in 2013
- Born: Martin Glenn Prather; May 26, 1958 (age 68); Evansville, Indiana
- Died: September 25, 2025 (aged 67); Springfield, MO
- Burial place: Saint Francis Borgia Cemetery, Washington, MO
- Other name: "The Sign Man"
- Occupation: Pizza Store Franchisee
- Organization(s): Domino's, A&M Pizza Inc.
- Known for: Professional sports fandom signs
- Parent(s): Eugenia McLemore and William Prather
- Awards: Missouri Sports Hall of Fame member, 10 time Dominos Golder Franny Award national award winner

Martin Glenn "Marty" "The Sign Man" Prather was a member of the Missouri Sports Hall of Fame, and was inducted as the institution's first superfan in 2003. Prather received notable and repeated national and local media attention between the years 1985 and 2025 for his continual use of unique, witty, and professionally pronounced fan-signs at games for the St. Louis Cardinals and Missouri State Bears. Additionally, Prather also earned national recognition in his professional career as a Dominos pizza franchisee as a 10-time winner of the "Golden Franny" nationwide Dominos franchisee award along with his business partner Art Hurteau. Prather passed away in 2025 after battling illness.

== Early life ==
Prather was born in Evansville, Indiana and raised in Bellbrook, Ohio. He grew up a Cincinnati Reds fan during the team’s “Big Red Machine” dominance of the 1970s. After getting his start in his professional career with the Dominos pizza store chain as a delivery driver in 1976, he attended Wright State University. A few years later, Prather & business partner Art Hurteau opened their first Domino’s Pizza franchise in north St. Louis County. Prather then became a bigger St. Louis Cardinals fan during this time period, meeting team stars Ozzie Smith and Willie McGee.

== Sports Fandom Career ==
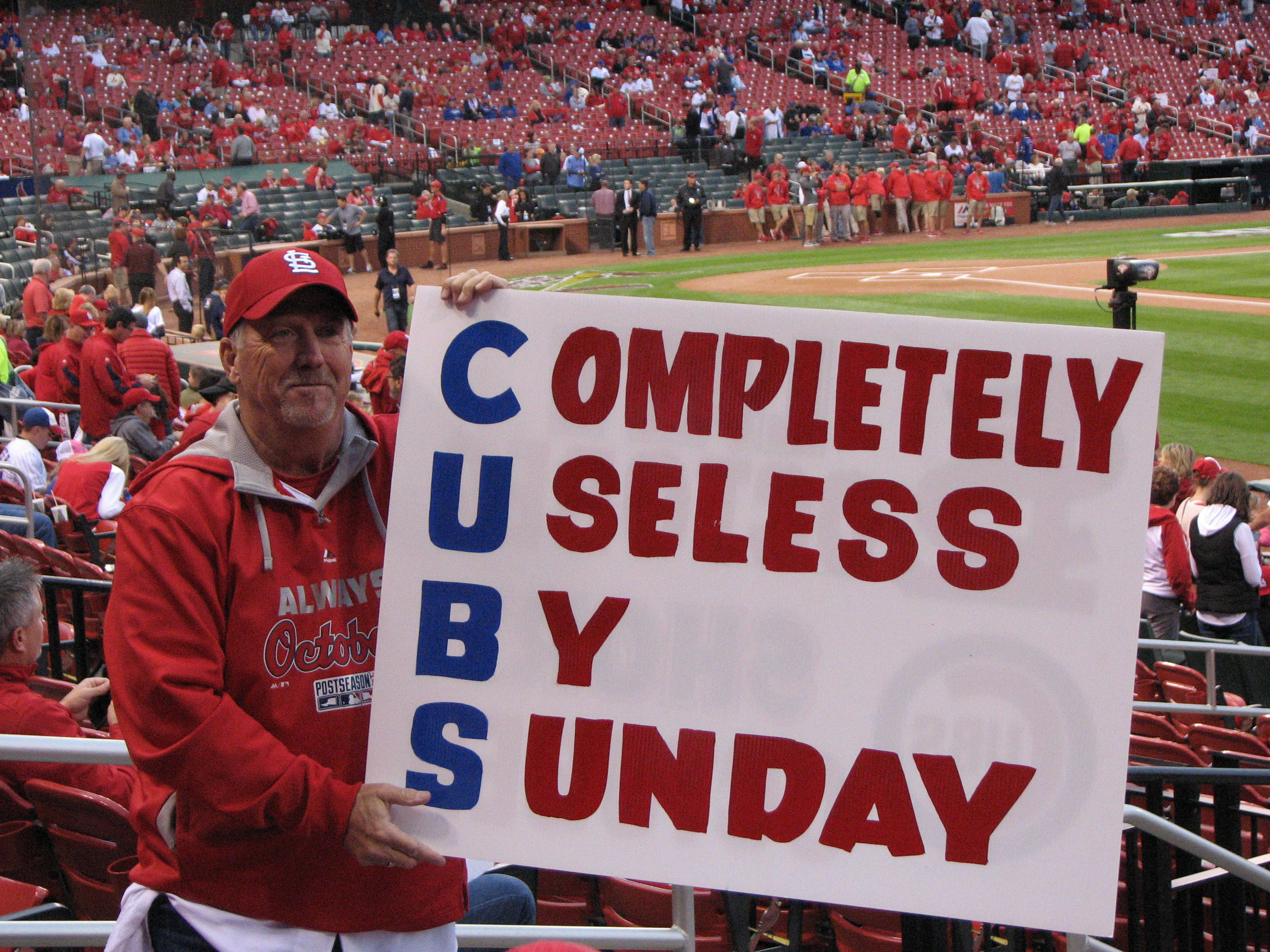
Marty "The Sign Man" Prather holds up one of his professionally made sports signs making fun of the Chicago Cubs baseball team before their game against the St. Louis Cardinals on Oct. 9th, 2015 at Busch Stadium in St. Louis, MO

Affectionately known as “The Sign Man” for his unwavering love and dedication to the St. Louis Cardinals and Missouri State Bears, Prather waved his first sign at a sporting event during the 1985 World Series between the St. Louis Cardinals and Kansas City Royals. Believing it to be a one-time thing, Prather received a phone call from his father in Florida telling him that he and his friend – seen dressed in tuxedos holding up his “The Fat Lady Is Singing” sign – had made national television.

Also during 1985, Prather begin enlisting the services of master sign craftsman John Short, who hand-painted the signs, and the association lasted more than three decades. In a 2016 interview with ESPN Sunday Night Baseball, Prather talked about getting inspired for sign ideas by a particular play, or an idea that came to him the middle of the night that he would then write down to avoid forgetting. Short would be responsible for the illustration aspects of the signs, & Short also had partial responsibility of the message composition sometimes beyond Prather's ideas. By the year 2016 Prather and Short had partnered in making over 3,000 signs together. Prather's volume of signs over the years became so large he had to rent at least one storage unit to house them.

With his hobby thenafter in full force, Prather at one time estimated he made more than 700 signs with at least 1,400 clever sayings over the years (prior to the 2016 timeframe). He was loyal to his teams, their coaches, players and fellow fans through thick and thin. Moreover, he became a lifelong friend and extended family member to many. Prather was inducted into the Missouri Sports Hall of Fame in 2003.

People here saw him at St. Louis Cardinals games on TV all the time. They saw him at Missouri State games and Springfield Cardinals games...He was a local sports celebrity, but he would genuinely connect with anyone he met. He was full of energy, vigor and a childlike enthusiasm all his life"

— Dan Reiter, Springfield Cardinals General Manager, comments on Prather before Prather's bobblehead day at Route 66 Stadium in 2026

An example of Prather being featured on a national televised broadcast was during Game 6 of the 2011 Word Series. Several minutes after David Freese's game winning home run, the Fox national broadcast featured Prather and his updated "Magic Number" sign that he used throughout the 2011 MLB Playoffs to count down the number of wins the Cardinals needed to secure their 11th World Series Championship, as well as other of his signs held up by his friends & family.

== Professional Career ==
Prather began working for the Domino's pizza store chain in 1976 as a driver at the campus store near University of Dayton, two weeks out of high school. Prather parlayed that start into future success, as his next notable career steps with Dominos came in moving to the St. Louis, MO area to operate stores in the north St. Louis area. After moving on from those stores, Prather moved to the Springfield, MO area, where he and business partner Art Hurteau then owned and operated Domino’s Pizza franchises throughout southwest Missouri and northwest Arkansas. The duo was awarded the Gold Franny Award by Domino’s earlier in 2025 for the 10th time. The award is chosen among 750 franchise owners across the United States for operational audit scores, community involvement, store safety and team member morale. Upon winning the 2025 award with Hurteau, Prather was quoted as saying, "“We are incredibly honored to receive a Gold Franny Award, but we must give credit to the great team members we have in all of our stores,” Marty Prather said. “Seeing the motivation that each of our managers bring to work every day motivates us to be better for them.”

== Death ==
Prather passed away on September 28th, 2025 in Springfield, MO after battling illness. His importance to the Missouri State sports program & popularity both locally in Springfield, the St. Louis area, & beyond led to his funeral service being held publicly at Juanita K. Hammons Hall on the campus of Missouri State University the following week on October 6th, 2025. Former Missouri State coach Barry Hinson, who Prather became friends with when Hinson began his coaching role at Missouri State, spoke at Prather's funeral. Prather was then interred at Saint Francis Borgia Cemetery, Washington, MO

== Awards & Recognition ==
- 2003 Missouri Sports Hall of Fame inductee
- 10 time Domino's Pizza company Golder Franny Award winner franchisee award winner
- "The Sign Man" Marty Prather Bobblehead giveaway day by Springfield Cardinals on June 12th, 2026
