= Vic Eaton =

American football player (born 1933)

No. 12
- Positions: Quarterback, defensive back

Personal information
- Born: January 3, 1933 (age 93); Savannah, Missouri, U.S.
- Listed height: 6 ft 2 in (1.88 m)
- Listed weight: 200 lb (91 kg)

Career information
- High school: Lafayette (St. Joseph, Missouri)
- College: Missouri
- NFL draft: 1955: 11th round, 126th overall pick

Career history
- Pittsburgh Steelers (1955)

Awards and highlights
- Second-team All-Big Seven (1954)

Career NFL statistics
- Punts: 66
- Punting yards: 2,522
- Longest punt: 57
- Stats at Pro Football Reference

Victor Roe Eaton (born January 3, 1933) is an American former professional football player for the Pittsburgh Steelers of the National Football League (NFL). He played college football for the Missouri Tigers.

In 2011, Eaton was inducted into the Missouri Sports Hall of Fame.
