= Forrest Hamilton =

American basketball player (1930–2021)

Personal information
- Born: June 16, 1930 St. Clair, Missouri, U.S.
- Died: October 7, 2021 (aged 91) Beaverton, Oregon, U.S.

Career information
- College: Missouri
- NBA draft: 1953: 6th round
- Drafted by: New York Knicks
- Stats at Basketball Reference

Forrest "Fog" Clyde Hamilton (June 16, 1930 – October 7, 2021) was an American basketball player who was a star player for the University of Missouri in its back-to-back national championship appearances in 1952 and 1953, also serving as an alternate for the United States at the 1952 Summer Olympics, and on the gold medal-winning 1954 FIBA World Championship tournament team. He was inducted into the Missouri Sports Hall of Fame in 1990. He was chosen in the sixth round of the 1953 NBA draft by the New York Knicks. He later played in the Amateur Athletic Union with the Peoria Caterpillars.

== Biography ==
Forrest was born in Saint Clair, Missouri on June 16, 1930. In later life he became a sales professional for the Chase Bag Company in St. Louis, Missouri. He married Betty Von Hoffmann, with whom he had two children. After this marriage ended, he married Joan Francine Merlo, with whom he moved to Louisville, Kentucky, for his employer, and had another son. The family later moved to Beaverton, Oregon, again for Hamilton's employer. He died there on October 7, 2021, at the age of 91.
