= Missouri Sports Hall of Fame =

Located in Springfield, Missouri, United States

- Established: 1994
- Location: 3861 East Stan Musial Drive, Springfield, Missouri, United States
- Coordinates: 37.1206°N 93.2174°W
- Visitors: 10,000 Annually
- Director: Byron Shive
- Website: Missouri Sports Hall of Fame

The Missouri Sports Hall of Fame is located in Springfield, Missouri, United States. Founded in 1994 by Springfield businessman John Q. Hammons, the Hall of Fame is housed in a two-story, 32,000-square-foot building. On display are more than 4,000 items of sports memorabilia and exhibits related to Missouri amateur and professional athletics. Various interactive attractions allow visitors to simulate driving a NASCAR race car, stepping into the batters box against a Major League Baseball pitcher, and throwing football passes. Next to the Hall is the Legends Walk of Fame, a plaza-like outdoor setting featuring busts and statuary of notable Missouri sports figures given the yearly Legends Award.

== Criteria for inclusion ==
The Missouri Sports Hall of Fame considers for induction individuals and teams that were born in Missouri, made their sports career in Missouri, or contributed to amateur or professional sports in Missouri.

Nominees are presented to a selection board who choose one group a year. The size of the annual groups has increased over the years; today, a series of regional events is held around the state rather than having all new inductees travel to Springfield.

== Inductees ==
Year	Name	Sport
1951	Carl Hubbell	Baseball
1952	Casey Stengel	Baseball
1952	Phog Allen	Basketball
1953	Don Faurot	Football
1953	Bill Corum	Media
1954	Cal Hubbard	Football & Official
1955	Vern Kennedy	Baseball
1956	Brutus Hamilton	Track & Field
1956	Fred W. Stockman Post 245	Baseball
1957	C. E. McBride	Media
1957	Andy Russell	Football
1958	Zack Wheat	Baseball
1959	George Goldman	Basketball
1960	Paul Christman	Football
1961	Henry Iba	Basketball
1961	Ernie McMillan	Football
1962	Anheuser-Busch Post 299	Baseball
1962	Don Carter	Bowling
1963	Stan Musial	Baseball
1963	Dwight Davis	Tennis
1963	Robert Simpson	Track & Field
1964	Jim Conzelman	Football
1964	Horton Smith	Golf
1964	Helen Stephens	Track & Field
1965	Branch Rickey	Baseball
1965	George Sisler	Baseball
1965	J. G. Taylor Spink	Media
1966	Gabby Street	Baseball
1966	Charley Grimm	Baseball
1966	Henry Armstrong	Boxing
1967	Frank Ervin	Harness Racing
1967	Ed Wray	Media
1967	Ernie Mehl	Media
1967	Clark Griffith	Baseball
1968	Bob Steuber	Football
1968	Opal Hill	Golf
1969	Ed Macauley	Basketball
1969	Gwinn Henry	Football
1969	Lela Hall Frank	Trapshooting
1970	Dizzy Dean	Baseball
1970	Yogi Berra	Baseball
1970	Joe Garagiola	Media
1970	Robert Hyland	Sports Medicine
1971	Darold Jenkins	Football
1971	Bob Cochran	Golf
1971	Hershel Neil	Track & Field
1972	Frank Frisch	Baseball
1972	Herb Bunker	Basketball
1972	Rogers Hornsby	Baseball
1972	Brick Travis	Football
1973	George Edwards	Basketball
1973	Dan Devine	Football
1974	Abe Stuber	Football
1974	Harry Smith	Football
1975	August Busch Jr.	Baseball
1975	Craig Ruby	Basketball
1976	Ewing Kauffman	Baseball
1976	Glenn Wright	Baseball
1977	John "Hi" Simmons	Baseball
1977	Forrest DeBernardi	Basketball
1977	Tom Botts	Track & Field
1978	Dick Weber	Bowling
1978	Bob Broeg	Media
1978	Bob Burnes	Media
1978	Dee Boeckmann	Track & Field
1979	Satchel Paige	Baseball
1979	Sparky Stalcup	Basketball
1980	Cool Papa Bell	Baseball
1980	Buddy Blattner	Media
1980	Jack Buck	Media
1980	Nick Lowery	Football
1981	Cotton Fitzsimmons	Basketball
1981	Volney Ashford	Football
1981	W. A. Boyd Jr.	Football
1983	Bill Virdon	Baseball
1983	Jim Jackson	Golf
1983	E. L. Niedermeyer	Sports Medicine
1983	Harriett Bland Green	Track & Field
1984	Tom Watson	Golf
1984	Joe McGuff	Media
1984	Bill Jones	Sports Medicine
1984	Bruce Melin	Sports Medicine
1984	Glenn McElroy	Sports Medicine
1984	Harrison Weaver	Sports Medicine
1984	Isadore Middleman	Sports Medicine
1984	James Baker	Sports Medicine
1984	Oliver DeVictor	Sports Medicine
1984	Wayne Rudy	Sports Medicine
1985	Paul Meyer	Sports Medicine
1985	Reed Maxson	Sports Medicine
1985	Stan London	Sports Medicine
1986	Andy McDonald	Basketball
1986	Pete Adkins	Football
1986	Harvey Michael	Sports Medicine
1987	Red Schoendienst	Baseball
1987	Bob Kurland	Basketball
1987	Bernard Garfinkel	Sports Medicine
1987	E. A. Porter	Sports Medicine
1987	James Leslie	Sports Medicine
1987	Paul McGannon	Sports Medicine
1987	Harlan Hunter	Sports Medicine
1987	Aldo Sebben	Track & Field
1988	Bertha Teague	Basketball
1988	Bill Bradley	Basketball
1988	Billy Key	Basketball
1988	D. C. Wilcutt	Basketball
1988	Denver Miller	Basketball
1988	Emil Liston	Basketball
1988	Franklin Smith	Basketball
1988	Fred Biesemeyer	Basketball
1988	Gene Steighorst	Basketball
1988	Ron Jones	Basketball
1988	Russ Kaminsky	Basketball
1988	Ryland Milner	Football/basketball
1988	Ronald VanDam	Sports Medicine
1988	Gary Hazelrigg	Sports Medicine
1988	John Omohundro	Sports Medicine
1988	C. E. Barnhart	Trapshooting
1988	Pop Springer	Basketball
1988	Bob Vanatta	Basketball
1988	Boyd King	Basketball
1988	Dick Boushka	Basketball
1988	Donn Foster	Basketball
1988	Eddie Hickey	Basketball
1988	Gary Filbert	Basketball
1988	Gene Bartow	Basketball
1988	Harry Gallatin	Basketball
1988	James Wilson	Basketball
1988	Jodie Bailey	Basketball
1988	Larry Atwood	Basketball
1988	Louis Kastner	Basketball
1988	Maurice John	Basketball
1988	Norm Stewart	Basketball
1988	Ray DeGreef	Basketball
1988	Rex Bailey	Basketball
1988	Marty Eddlemon	Media
1988	Richard Bowles	Sports Medicine
1988	Webb City High School football	Football
1990	Arvel Popp	Basketball
1990	Bill Stauffer	Basketball
1990	Bill Thomas	Basketball
1990	Bob Sechrest	Basketball
1990	Burl Henderson	Basketball
1990	Chuck Smith	Basketball
1990	Claude Samson	Basketball
1990	Curtis Perry	Basketball
1990	Don Williams	Basketball
1990	Earl Keth	Basketball
1990	Erv Leimer	Basketball
1990	Forrest Hamilton	Basketball
1990	James Nelson	Basketball
1990	Jerry Anderson	Basketball
1990	Joe Kleine	Basketball
1990	John Cooper	Basketball
1990	Larry Drew	Basketball
1990	Max Hayes	Basketball
1990	Palmer Nichols	Basketball
1990	Richard Fairchild	Basketball
1990	Lamar Hunt	Football
1990	Mahlon Aldridge	Media
1990	Robert M. Carlson	Media
1990	Red Weir	Official
1990	Howard Ellfeldt	Sports Medicine
1991	Bob Murrey	Administrator
1991	Al Eberhard	Basketball
1991	Bill Barton	Basketball
1991	George Sherman	Basketball
1991	Harold Alcorn	Basketball
1991	Harry Rogers	Basketball
1991	Jo Jo White	Basketball
1991	Lionel Smith	Basketball
1991	Marvin Neals	Basketball
1991	Nancy Rutter	Basketball
1991	Norm Wagner	Basketball
1991	Ronnie Cookson	Basketball
1991	Tyke Yates	Basketball
1991	Walter Shublom	Basketball
1991	Ed Osiek	Official
1992	Irwin Keller	Administrator
1992	Ken Boyer	Baseball
1992	Lou Brock	Baseball
1992	Marty Marion	Baseball
1992	Roy Sievers	Baseball
1992	Terry Moore	Baseball
1992	Johnny Reagan	Basketball
1992	Skip Wolfe	Basketball
1992	Ben Kerner	Basketball
1992	Bob Nelson	Basketball
1992	Carla Eades	Basketball
1992	Cave Barrows	Basketball
1992	Clarence Iba	Basketball
1992	Dan Pippen	Basketball
1992	Don Gosen	Basketball
1992	Earl Iba	Basketball
1992	Earl Jansen	Basketball
1992	Finis Barrows	Basketball
1992	Gil Hanlin	Basketball
1992	Harold Barrows	Basketball
1992	Harold Robertson	Basketball
1992	Howard Iba	Basketball
1992	Jim Wilkinson	Basketball
1992	John Barrows	Basketball
1992	Kim Anderson	Basketball
1992	Lee McKinney	Basketball
1992	Lloyd Barrows	Basketball
1992	Med Park	Basketball
1992	Ray Bob Carey	Basketball
1992	Raymond Barrows	Basketball
1992	Ruth Casey Osburn	Basketball
1992	Tom Stanton	Basketball
1992	Ray Bluth	Bowling
1992	John Q. Hammons	Contributor
1992	Amadee Wohlschlaeger	Media
1992	Alex George	Official
1992	Harry Keough	Soccer
1992	Doc Bauman	Sports Medicine
1992	Red Williams	Sports Medicine
1992	Ivan Milton	Sports Medicine
1992	Dick Newman	Water Polo
1992	Sam Muchnick	Wrestling
1993	Bill Callahan	Administrator
1993	Alberta Lee Cox	Basketball
1993	Bob Pettit	Basketball
1993	Carl Ritter	Basketball
1993	Jack Roberts	Basketball
1993	Jerry Buescher	Basketball
1993	Jim Ball	Basketball
1993	Melford Waits	Basketball
1993	Robert Wilhoit	Basketball
1993	Walt Schoenke	Basketball
1993	Harry Ice	Football
1993	Jim Kekeris	Football
1993	Maurice Red Wade	Football
1993	Dave Dorr	Media
1993	Stan Isle	Media
1993	Jenks Jenkins	Official
1993	Larry Zirbel	Official
1993	Buss Carr	Sports Medicine
1993	Dick Ault	Track & Field
1993	John Furla	Track & Field
1994	Buck O'Neil	Baseball
1994	Whitey Herzog	Baseball
1994	Frank White	Baseball
1994	George Brett	Baseball
1994	Jerry Lumpe	Baseball
1994	Bill Bradley	Basketball
1994	Charlie Spoonhour	Basketball
1994	Cliff Hagan	Basketball
1994	Wayne Winstead	Basketball
1994	Harold Ensley	Fishing
1994	Jackie Smith	Football
1994	Kellen Winslow	Football
1994	Len Dawson	Football
1994	Otis Taylor	Football
1994	Roger Wehrli	Football
1994	Duke Gibson	Golf
1994	Hale Irwin	Golf
1994	Herman Keiser	Golf
1994	Payne Stewart	Golf
1994	Bill Grigsby	Media
1994	Bob Costas	Media
1994	Fred Wappel	Sports Medicine
1994	Joe Dolan	Sports Medicine
1995	Bobby Bell	Football
1995	Marion Morgan	Sports Medicine
1995	Butch Buchholz	Tennis
1995	Christie Freeman	Waterskiing
1995	Steve Alford	Basketball
1996	Bing Devine	Baseball
1996	Bob Gibson	Baseball
1996	Carl Richard	Bowling
1996	Hank Stram	Football
1996	Jan Stenerud	Football
1996	Ken Lanning	Golf
1996	Jimmy Jones	Horse Trainer
1996	Pat McBride	Soccer
1997	Dan Quisenberry	Baseball
1997	Ozzie Smith	Baseball
1997	Carroll Cookson	Basketball
1997	Larry Jansen	Basketball
1997	Mike Todorovich	Basketball
1997	Fred Arbanas	Football
1997	Mike Shanahan	Hockey
1997	Johnny Morris	Outdoorsman
1997	Jack Rockwell	Sports Medicine
1997	Randy Biggerstaff	Sports Medicine
1997	Ginny Fuldner	Swimming
1998	Rusty Wallace	Auto Racing
1998	Preacher Roe	Baseball
1998	Hank Bauer	Baseball
1998	John Earl Chase	Basketball
1998	Sue Schuble	Basketball/volleyball
1998	Flora Mitchell	Bowling
1998	Ed Budde	Football
1998	Jerry Jones	Football
1998	Jim Hart	Football
1998	Paul Martel	Football
1998	Rickey McCormick	Water Skiing
1998	1998-99 SMS Bears	Basketball
1999	Mary Jo Wynn	Administrator
1999	Enos Slaughter	Baseball
1999	Fred Patek	Baseball
1999	Fred Pohlman Jr.	Basketball
1999	Hugh Dunn	Basketball
1999	Melody Howard	Basketball
1999	Leon Spinks	Boxing
1999	John Howard	Cycling
1999	Dan Dierdorf	Football
1999	Johnny Robinson	Football
1999	Len Dawson	Football
1999	Willie Lanier	Football
1999	Mike Shannon	Media
1999	Marion Wolf	Sports Medicine
1999	Eddie Williams	Wrestling
2000	Darrell Porter	Baseball
2000	Gaylord Perry	Baseball
2000	Orlando Cepeda	Baseball
2000	Tom Henke	Baseball
2000	Al Houser	Basketball
2000	Bob Ferry	Basketball
2000	Cheryl Burnett	Basketball
2000	Denny Burrows	Basketball
2000	Norm Stewart	Basketball
2000	Nelson Burton Jr.	Bowling
2000	Mo Moorman	Football
2000	Curt Merz	Football
2000	Larry Wilson	Football
2000	Paul Mullins	Football
2000	Payne Stewart	Golf
2000	Jack Buck	Media
2001	Larry Phillips	Auto Racing
2001	Don Gutteridge	Baseball
2001	Willie Wilson	Baseball
2001	1967 & 1968 Bradleyville Eagles Basketball	Basketball
2001	Steve Stipanovich	Basketball
2001	Joe Bill Dixon	Cross Country/track
2001	Ernie Daughtery	Fishing
2001	Dick Vermeil	Football
2001	Don Faurot	Football
2001	Marcus Allen	Football
2001	Jim Tom Blair	Golf
2001	Bob Broeg	Media
2001	Ned Reynolds	Media
2001	Al Conway	Official
2001	Larry Nemmers	Official
2001	1950 U.S. World Cup soccer team	Soccer
2001	Patrick Harr	Sports Medicine
2001	Lori Endicott-Vandersnick	Volleyball
2002	1968 William Jewell College Cardinals Baseball	Baseball
2002	Bob Forsch	Baseball
2002	Buck O'Neil	Baseball
2002	Dick Birmingham	Baseball
2002	Paul Splittorff	Baseball
2002	1978-79 Drury College Panthers Basketball	Basketball
2002	Bud Lathrop	Basketball
2002	Jackie Stiles	Basketball
2002	Johnny Copeland	Boxing
2002	Jerry Clinton	Contributor
2002	John Q. Hammons	Contributor
2002	Bob Fairchild	Football
2002	Deron Cherry	Football
2002	Bernie Federko	Hockey
2002	Bob Kehoe	Soccer
2002	Lou Thesz	Wrestling
2003	Al Hrabosky	Baseball
2003	Dennis Leonard	Baseball
2003	George Brett	Baseball
2003	George Kissell	Baseball
2003	Al Waller	Basketball
2003	Jack Bush	Basketball
2003	Bill Laurie	Contributor
2003	Charlie Campbell	Fishing
2003	Christian Okoye	Football
2003	Conrad Dobler	Football
2003	Gil Rector	Football
2003	Ozarks Coca-Cola/Dr Pepper Bottling Company	JQH Founders Award
2003	Jack Fette	Official
2003	Rita Hoff Scott	Racquetball
2003	2002 St. Joseph Casino Players Softball	Softball
2003	Marty Prather	Sports Fan
2004	Bill Rowe	Administrator
2004	1954 University of Missouri Tigers Baseball	Baseball
2004	Hal McRae	Baseball
2004	Rick Sutcliffe	Baseball
2004	Tim McCarver	Baseball
2004	1957-1958 St. Louis Hawks	Basketball
2004	Floyd Irons	Basketball
2004	Bob Shore	Football
2004	Derland Moore	Football
2004	Hank Stram	Football
2004	Jim Kearney	Football
2004	Lamar Hunt	Football
2004	Great Southern Bank	JQH Founders Award
2004	John Rooney	Media
2004	Dave Phillips	Official
2004	Bill Seebold	Powerboat Racing
2004	Gene Gieselmann	Sports Medicine
2004	Jodie Adams	Tennis/administrator
2004	Chris Carpenter	Baseball
2004	Billy Butler	Baseball
2005	Edsel Matthews	Administrator
2005	Jerry Hughes	Administrator
2005	Jeffrey Clinton	Auto Racing
2005	Masten Gregory	Auto Racing
2005	Bo Jackson	Baseball
2005	Red Schoendienst	Baseball
2005	Ted Simmons	Baseball
2005	1988, 1989 & 1990 Marshfield High School Lady Jays Basketball	Basketball
2005	Art Still	Football
2005	Gus Otto	Football
2005	Jim Hanifan	Football
2005	John Kadlec	Football
2005	Ted Chittwood	Football
2005	Meyer Communications	JQH Founders Award
2005	Denny Matthews	Media
2005	Carl Peterson	Sports Executive
2006	Dan Kinney	Administrator
2006	Jeff Montgomery	Baseball
2006	Lou Brock	Baseball
2006	Tony La Russa	Baseball
2006	1984 Central Missouri State University Mules & Jennies Basketball Teams	Basketball
2006	Lynn Nance	Basketball
2006	Kristin Folkl	Basketball/volleyball
2006	Bill Snyder	Football
2006	Bobby Bell	Football
2006	Chuck Shelton	Football
2006	Gene Bess	Basketball
2006	Gary Spani	Football
2006	Norris Patterson	Football
2006	McQueary Brothers Drug Company	JQH Founders Award
2006	Richard Osborn Sr.	Martial Arts
2006	Greg Marecek	Media
2006	Bob Chandler	Motorsports
2006	Rusty Wallace	Motorsports
2006	David Colt	Sports Medicine
2007	Bruce Sutter	Baseball
2007	Gene McArtor	Baseball
2007	Jim Eisenreich	Baseball
2007	Walt Jocketty	Baseball
2007	Lou Adamie	Baseball Scorekeeper
2007	Bob Pettit	Basketball
2007	Bill Ross	Basketball/golf
2007	1941-48 Missouri Valley College Football Teams	Football
2007	Curtis McClinton	Football
2007	Doug Potts	Football
2007	Russ Sloan	Football
2007	Pat Leahy	Football/soccer
2007	Hillyard, Inc	JQH Founders Award
2007	Mark Curp	Long Distance Runner
2007	Jay Randolph Sr.	Media
2007	Ron Zetcher	Official
2007	Erma Bergie Bergmann	Softball/baseball
2007	Brian Reynolds	Swimming
2008	John Wathan	Baseball
2008	Keith Hernandez	Baseball
2008	Lee Thomas	Baseball
2008	Whitey Herzog	Baseball
2008	Bobby L. Brown	Basketball
2008	Charlie Share	Basketball
2008	George Wilson	Basketball
2008	John Brown	Basketball
2008	Sandy Pomerantz	Basketball
2008	SEMO 1984 Cross Country Team	Cross Country
2008	Gary O'Neal	Football
2008	Jim Redd	Football
2008	Neil Smith	Football
2008	Rod Smith	Football
2008	Earl Denny	Football / Track
2008	Tommy Burnett	Handball / Football
2008	Hiland Dairy	JQH Founders Award
2008	Rick Hummel	Media
2008	SMSU 1974 Softball Team	Softball
2008	Trish Knight	Volleyball
2009	Will Shields	Football
2009	Carl Mays	Baseball
2009	Ken Reitz	Baseball
2009	Steve Busby	Baseball
2009	Todd Worrell	Baseball
2009	Grant Wistrom	Football
2009	John Mayberry	Baseball
2009	Al Trost	Soccer
2009	Bill Tobin	Football
2009	Vince Tobin	Football
2009	Larry Holley	Basketball
2009	Reba Sims	Basketball
2009	Steve Hancock	Football
2009	Thomas A. Lombardo	Football
2009	Saint Louis University 50 Years Of Soccer	Soccer
2009	1969 Kansas City Chiefs	Football
2009	1959 Parkview Tastemark American Legion Junior Baseball Team	Baseball
2009	1959 St. Agnes Basketball Team & Coach Robert Taylor	Basketball
2009	Price Cutter	JQH Founder Award
2010	White River Valley Electric	Business
2010	1979 Southwest Missouri State (now Missouri State) University Women's Field Hockey Teams	Field Hockey
2010	1985 Kansas City Royals	Baseball
2010	Mid State Oil Softball 1974–1979 Teams	Baseball
2010	Irl Robinson	Golf
2010	Ellen Gale Hopkins Green	Swimming
2010	Mark Musso	Special Olympics
2010	Leo Harrison III	Trap Shooter
2010	Peter Herschend	Cyclist
2010	Martin Hagan	Rifle
2010	Dewey Combs	Football
2010	Roy Green	Football
2010	John Bryant	Tennis
2010	Mel Tjeerdsma	Football
2010	Bruce Van Dyke	Football
2010	Tom Pagnozzi	Baseball
2010	Mark Gubicza	Baseball
2010	Marty Schottenheimer	Football
2010	Dick Howser	Baseball
2010	Danny LaRose	Football
2010	Dan Dierdorf	Football
2010	Lawrence Walls	Football
2011	Priest Holmes	Football
2011	Tom Herr	Baseball
2011	Kenny Schrader	Auto Racing
2011	Mike Matheny	Baseball
2011	Johnny Roland	Football
2011	Jack Emmitt	Fishing
2011	Jess Bolen	Baseball
2011	Vernon "Hap" Whitney	Wrestling
2011	Stephanie Phillips	Basketball
2011	Randy Morrow	Football
2011	Ray Cliffe	Football
2011	Monsignor Louis F. Meyer	Soccer
2011	Linda Dollar	Volleyball
2011	Dick Zitzmann	Media
2011	Dr. Mildred Barnes	Basketball
2011	Ed Crenshaw	Basketball
2011	Gary Filbert	Basketball
2011	Forest Arnold	Basketball
2011	Hilly Beck	Basketball
2011	Ed Blaine	Football
2011	Nan Carter	Softball
2011	H. L. Childress	Sporting Clays
2011	Bill Clark	Administrator
2011	Vic Eaton	Football
2011	Richard Flanagan	Administrator
2011	Julius Hochman	Baseball
2011	John Kadlec	Football
2011	Doug Minnis	Baseball
2011	Missouri State University 1987-Handball	
2011	Mound City High School	Football
2011	Ozzie Smith	Baseball
2011	Norris Stevenson	Football
2011	Herb Webster	Basketball
2011	Central Bank	JQH Founder Award
2012	Jim Edmonds	Baseball
2012	Emmitt Thomas	Football
2012	Jon Sundvold	Basketball
2012	Jamie Quirk	Baseball
2012	Mel Gray	Football
2012	Al Onofrio	Football
2012	Mickey Owen	Baseball
2012	Dr. Richard Lehman	Sports Medicine
2012	Rex Sinquefield	Chess
2012	Jim Pearson	Golf/Football
2012	Richard Hantak	Football
2012	Ellen Fuson Port	Golf
2012	Clyde Lear	Media
2012	Gene Ruble	Basketball
2012	Columbia College Women's Volleyball	Volleyball
2012	New Haven High School Basketball	Basketball
2012	St. John's Health System	JQH Founder's Award
2012	Dr. John D. Bailey	Sports Medicine
2012	Shane Cavanah	Football Coaching
2012	Gary "Skip" Grossnickle	Football
2012	Gerald "Shag" Grossnickle	Football/Hunting
2012	Darold Knowles	Baseball
2012	Ben Pitney	Basketball
2012	Bob Roberts	Basketball Coaching
2012	1969, 1970, 1971 Northeast Missouri State University football teams	Football
2012	Derrick Chievous	Basketball
2012	Joe Cunningham	Baseball
2012	Trent Green	Football
2012	Dick Groat	Baseball
2012	Mike Jones	Football
2012	Willie Smith	Basketball
2012	Dick Vermeil	Football
2012	Bill Virdon	Baseball
2013	Mike Sweeney	Baseball
2013	David Eckstein	Baseball
2013	Tony Richardson	Football
2013	Tom Rutledge	Track
2013	Scott Bailes	Baseball
2013	Kim Anderson	Basketball
2013	Harley Race	Pro Wrestling
2013	Conrad Hitchler	Football
2013	Ron Jacober	Media
2013	Joe Scott	Basketball
2013	Linda Lampkin	Volleyball
2013	Dale Russell	Basketball
2013	Richard Seagrave	Sports medicine
2013	Dave Palmeiro	Football
2013	Jim Chappell	JQH Founders Award
2014	Dr. Mark Adams	Sports medicine
2014	Empire Bank	JQH Founders Award
2014	Teri Clemens	Volleyball
2014	Dave Duncan	Baseball
2014	Bonus Frost	Softball
2014	Andy Hill	Football
2014	Hillcrest High School and American Legion Baseball	Baseball
2014	Bob Kendrick	Baseball/Administrator
2014	Gary Link	Media
2014	Dr. Pat Lipira	Softball/Volleyball
2014	Mike Macfarlane	Baseball
2014	Willie McGee	Baseball
2014	Becky Oakes	Administrator
2014	Parkway West High School Swimming Program	Swimming
2014	Robert Penn	Football
2014	Ed Podolak	Football
2014	Jason Pyrah	Cross Country/Track and Field
2014	Neil Rackers	Football
2014	Steve Rogers	Baseball
2014	Tom Smith	Basketball
2014	Luke Snyder	Bull riding
2014	Jack Steck	Swimming
2014	Warren Turner	Baseball
2014	Patty Viverito	Administrator
2014	Mechelle Voepel	Media
2014	Dr. Mary Jo Wynn	Administrator
2015	Ken Ash	Administrator
2015	Cheryl Burnett	Basketball
2015	Joe Castiglione	Administrator
2015	Al Eberhard	Basketball
2015	John Henage	Football/administrator
2015	Charlie James	Baseball
2015	1969 University of Missouri football team	Football
2015	1992 Missouri State Lady Bears Final Four team	Basketball
2015	2001 Missouri State Lady Bears Final Four team	Basketball
2015	Gayle Lampe	Equestrian
2015	Ben Loeb	Tennis
2015	Squeaky Marquart	Sports Fan
2015	Jack Miles	Administrator
2015	1952, 1953 NAIA Champions MSU Bears	Basketball
2015	1964–1966 Parkview's Jolly Green Giants	Basketball
2015	Patti Phillips	Administrator
2015	Karen Rapier	Basketball
2015	Cathy Reynolds	Golf
2015	Jerome Sally	Football
2015	Dr. Pat Smith	Sports medicine
2015	Gary Stanfield	Basketball
2015	Jon Sundvold	Basketball
2015	Suzy Thompson	Cheerleading
2015	Kate Walker	Powerlifting
2015	Larry Young	Race walking
2016	Randy Ball	Football
2016	Gene Bess	Basketball
2016	Blake DeWitt	Baseball
2016	Tim Grunhard	Football
2016	Terin Humphrey	Gymnastics
2016	Jason Isringhausen	Baseball
2016	L. J. Jenkins	Bull Riding
2016	Corby Jones	Football
2016	Natasha Kaiser-Brown	Athletics
2016	Wayne Kreklow	Volleyball
2016	Mark Littell	Baseball
2016	Eddie Moss	Football
2016	Gary Pinkel	Football
2016	Jerry Reuss	Baseball
2016	Miles Smith	Athletics
2016	Gregg Williams	Football
2017	Mark Bailey	Baseball
2017	Jesse Branch	Football
2017	Rick Clunn	Fishing
2017	Vince Coleman	Baseball
2017	Jim Crane	Baseball
2017	Bob Dernier	Baseball
2017	John Donaldson	Baseball
2017	Jeff Emig	Racing/Motocross
2017	Art Hains	Broadcasting
2017	Ron Hall	Football
2017	Bill Kenney	Football
2017	Bill Maas	Football
2017	Amos Otis	Baseball
2018	Rick Ankiel	Baseball
2018	Gary Barnett	Football
2018	St. Louis Browns	Baseball
2018	Isaac Bruce	Football
2018	Mark Buehrle	Baseball
2018	Christian Cantwell	Athletics
2018	Mike Garrett	Football
2018	Bernard Gilkey	Baseball
2018	Irv Goode	Football
2018	Dante Hall	Football
2018	Jackie Joyner-Kersee	Athletics
2018	Al Nipper	Baseball
2018	Jim Otis	Football
2018	Anthony Peeler	Basketball
2018	Howard Richards	Football
2023	Rhonda Blades Brown	Basketball
2023	Kenny Wallace	Auto racing
2024	John Anderson	Track & Field and Sportscasting

== See also ==
- University of Missouri Intercollegiate Athletics Hall of Fame
- California Sports Hall of Fame#History
- St. Louis Wrestling Hall of Fame
