= Stan London =

American sports physician (1925–2020)

Stanley L. London
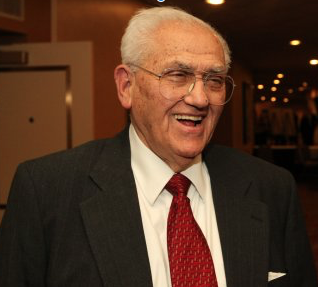
- Stan London
- Born: December 5, 1925
- Died: June 8, 2020 (aged 94)
- Education: Washington University in St. Louis
- Occupation: Doctor
- Basketball career

Career information
- High school: Springfield (Springfield, Illinois)
- College: Washington University (1944–1948)
- Position: Forward

Career history

Coaching
- 1948–1949: Washington University (assistant)
- Stats at Basketball Reference

Stanley L. London (December 5, 1925 – June 8, 2020) was an American doctor who worked with St. Louis Cardinals players beginning in 1956. The Springfield, Illinois, native became head physician for the team after I. C. Middleman died in 1968. He held this position for 29 seasons and became the team's senior medical adviser in October 1997. London was also team physician for the St. Louis Hawks for 11 seasons.

London received his medical degree from Washington University School of Medicine in 1949. He was a fellow in the American Board of Surgeons and the American College of Surgeons.

== Athletic career ==
London was a top amateur athlete, playing American handball, baseball and basketball. He played both college baseball and college basketball at Washington University, where he was named "Uncanny Stanley" for his performances. He was the first inductee into the Missouri Handball Hall of Fame. He was also a member of the Illinois Basketball Hall of Fame, the Missouri Sports Hall of Fame, the St. Louis Sports Hall of Fame, the Washington University Hall of Fame, and the Missouri Sports Medicine Hall of Fame.

== Coaching career ==
London served as an assistant coach for Washington's basketball team during the 1948–1949 season. In March 1949, he was named the head coach of Washington's baseball team for the remainder of the season.

== Personal life ==
His brother was Norman Sidney London, a locally famous St. Louis attorney, who died on March 1, 2014.
