= Gene Bess =

American basketball coach (1935–2026)

Biographical details
- Born: March 3, 1935; Oak Ridge, Missouri, U.S.
- Died: June 19, 2026 (aged 91)

Coaching career (HC unless noted)
- 1957–1959: Lesterville HS
- 1959–1964: Anniston HS
- 1964–1969: Oran HS
- 1970–1971: Three Rivers CC (assistant)
- 1971–2020: Three Rivers CC

Head coaching record
- Overall: 1,300–416 (college)

Gene Bess (March 3, 1935 – June 19, 2026) was an American basketball coach.

== Career ==
Bess, a native of Oak Ridge, Missouri, coached 12 years at Lesterville High School, Anniston High School, and Oran High School, recording 250 wins.

Bess went to Three Rivers Community College in Poplar Bluff, Missouri, in 1970, where he spent one season as an assistant coach before taking over head coaching reigns in 1971. His career win-loss record is 1,300-416 (.757 winning percentage), making him the all-time winningest college basketball coach at any level. He won two national junior college basketball titles, in 1979 and 1992, and was the first college coach to reach 1,000 and 1,200 wins. Bess coached NBA player Latrell Sprewell at Three Rivers. Bess announced his retirement from coaching in May 2020 after suffering from health problems in his final years on the bench.

Bess was inducted into the Poplar Bluff Sports Hall of Fame in 1983, the Missouri Basketball Coaches Hall of Fame in 1988, the NJCAA Hall of Fame in 1989 and the Missouri Sports Hall of Fame in 2006. In February 2023, Three Rivers Community College unveiled a Gene Bess statue in front of its homecourt, the Libla Family Sports Complex. He was elected to the Naismith Memorial Basketball Hall of Fame as part of the Class of 2023.

== Death ==
Bess died on June 19, 2026, at the age of 91.

== Sources ==
- Roberts, Nadine H.; C. A. Richardson (2006). Gene Bess: College Basketball's Winningest Coach. Morley, Missouri: Acclaim Press. ISBN 0-9773198-7-3.
