= Raytown Senior High School =

Raytown High School

Location
- 6019 Blue Ridge Boulevard; Raytown, Missouri 64133; 39°00′46″N 94°27′37″W

Information
- Type: Public
- Motto: Dream. Achieve. Succeed.
- Established: 1914
- School district: Raytown C-2 School District
- Principal: Andrew McCarthy
- Staff: 81.05 (FTE)
- Enrollment: 1,342 (2023–2024)
- Student to teacher ratio: 16.56
- Colors: Blue, White, Silver
- Mascot: Bluejay
- Information: (816) 268-7300
- Website: rhs.raytownschools.org

Raytown Senior High School is a high school located in Raytown, Missouri. The school was established in 1914. The enrollment of Raytown High School currently stands at 1503 students. The school, located in downtown Raytown, underwent two years of renovations from 1992–1994. The most recent renovations were completed just before the 2008–2009 term, and included the addition of 2 science classrooms. The school currently has Missouri A+ designation, and is MSIP Accredited.

== Notable alumni ==
- Bobbi Johnson Kauffman, 1963 graduate; Miss USA 1964
- Roger Allen III, 2004 graduate; football player for the Tampa Bay Buccaneers
- Bob Allison, 1952 graduate; 1959 American League Rookie of the Year with the Washington Senators
- Gene Clark, singer-songwriter and founding member of the folk rock band the Byrds
- Jeff Cornell, Major League Baseball player (San Francisco Giants)
- David F. Duncan, 1965 graduate; drug policy advisor to the Clinton White House
- Tyronn Lue, 1995 graduate; professional basketball player, Head coach with the Los Angeles Clippers
- Cortez Groves, 1996 graduate; professional basketball player for the Illawarra Hawks
- Dominique Morrison, 2008 graduate; college basketball player for Oral Roberts
- Aldon Smith, NFL player for Dallas Cowboys
