= Jim Chappell (businessman) =

- Born: James Birdsall Chappell; Keokuk, Iowa, U.S.
- Education: Drury University
- Occupations: Restaurateur, businessman
- Known for: Chappell's Restaurant & Sports Museum
- Board member of: Valley View Holding Company; First Bank of Missouri
- Spouse: Gina Chappell
- Children: 2
- Awards: Missouri Sports Hall of Fame (2013)

Jim Chappell is an American restaurateur and businessman.

== Early life and education ==
Chappell is from Keokuk, Iowa. In 1965, Chappell graduated from then-Drury College in Springfield, Missouri.

== Career ==
In 1978, Chappell ran for Missouri State Senate. From 1986 until 2018 he owned Chappell's Restaurant, as a sports and political bar.

In the fall of 2012, Jim Chappell co-authored "Conversations at Chappell's" with Matt Fulks.

The next year, Chappell was inducted into the Missouri Sports Hall of Fame.

== Board memberships ==
Chappell has been appointed to several boards and commissions. He served as chairman of the City Plan Commission; the commissioner of the Kansas City, Missouri Port Authority; and chairman of the Clay County Board of Election Commissioners.

Chappell was on the board of directors of the Valley View Holding Company from 1994 to 2017 and chairman of the board of the First Bank of Missouri from 1989 to 2017.

== Personal life ==
He lives in the Kansas City area with his wife, Gina. They have two daughters and five grandchildren.
