= Raytown, Missouri =

City in Jackson County, Missouri, United States

- City
- City of Raytown
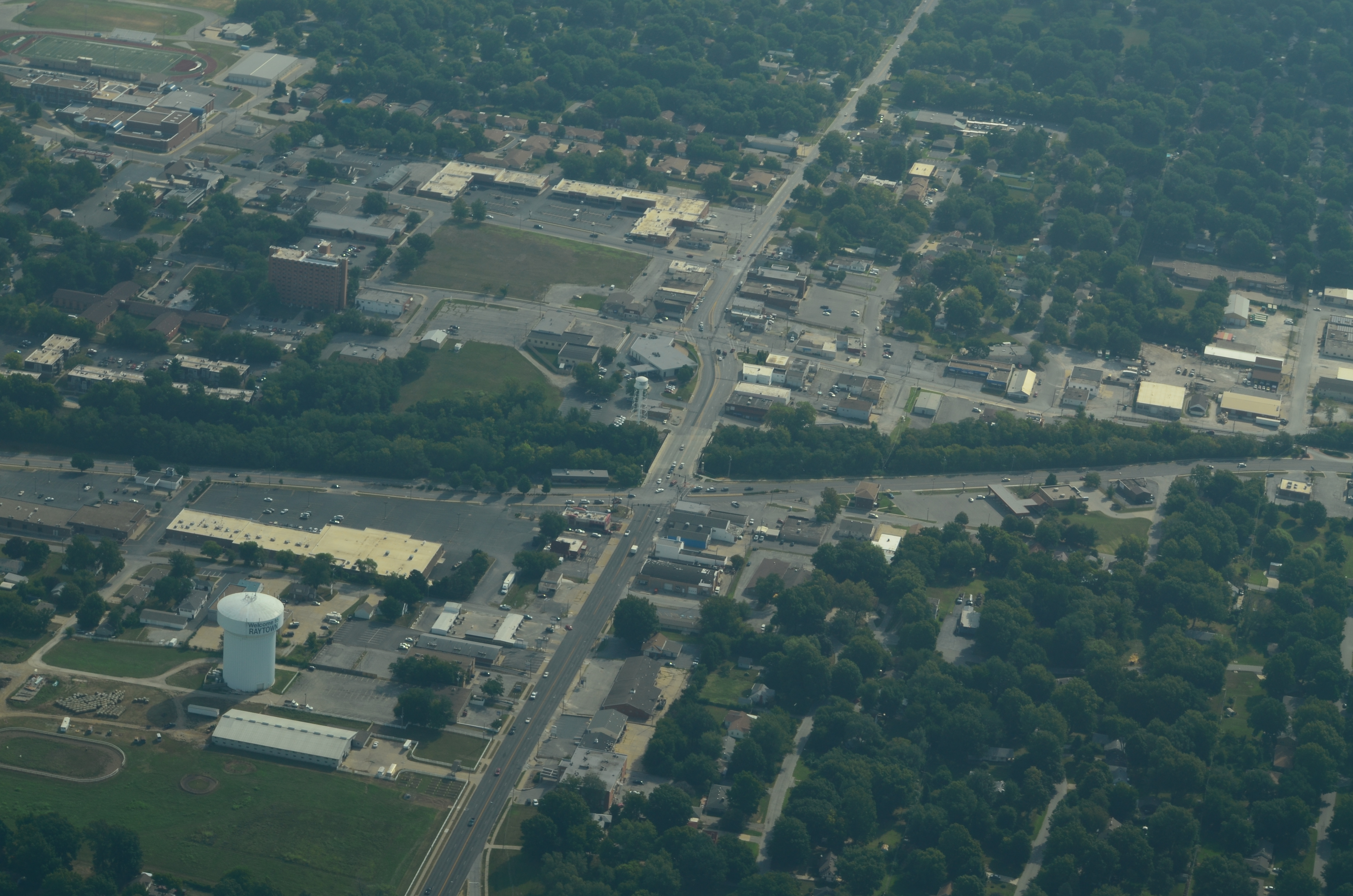
- Aerial view of Raytown

- Flag

- Location of Raytown in Jackson County and Missouri
- Coordinates: 38°59′42″N 94°27′56″W
- Country: United States
- State: Missouri
- County: Jackson

Government
  - Mayor: Michael McDonough

Area
  - Total: 9.97 sq mi (25.83 km^{2})
  - Land: 9.93 sq mi (25.72 km^{2})
  - Water: 0.042 sq mi (0.11 km^{2})
- Elevation: 1,014 ft (309 m)

Population (2020)
  - Total: 30,012
  - Density: 3,022.5/sq mi (1,166.99/km^{2})
- Time zone: UTC−6 (Central (CST))
  - Summer (DST): UTC−5 (CDT)
- ZIP codes: 64129, 64133, 64138
- Area codes: 816, 975
- FIPS code: 29-60788
- GNIS feature ID: 0735817
- Website: The City of Raytown web site

Raytown is a city in Jackson County, Missouri, United States, and is a suburb of Kansas City. The population was at 30,012 in 2020 census. The current mayor of Raytown is Michael McDonough. It is part of the Kansas City metropolitan area.

== History ==
The area where Raytown now lies was developed throughout the 19th century and early 20th century as pioneers moved westward along the Three Trails in search of available fertile lands and water. It was added to the state of Missouri at a cost of $800 by a treaty signed in 1826. Jackson County, named after President Andrew Jackson, was formed in 1827.

A large section of the county, Township 49, was accidentally not offered for sale when the other townships were, and so was called "The Lost Township". People moved into the township and squatted until the township was surveyed and the land sold in 1843.

The pioneers and travelers moving westward down the Three Trails discovered an area of high, wooded ridges, in the Raytown area, that reminded them of their former homes in the Blue Ridge Mountains. The land was named Blue Ridge, with the bordering bodies of waters called the Big Blue and the Little Blue rivers.

The Rice-Tremonti Home, which still stands in Raytown today, was built on the Santa Fe Trail in 1844 by Archibald Rice and his family.

William Ray established a blacksmith shop on the Santa Fe Trail in Jackson County in about 1848. The settlement around the blacksmith shop was known first as "Ray's Town" and later as "Raytown" in 1854. (Now Fox's Drugs) The Anvil on the flag was to commemorate William Ray and his blacksmith shop.

There is now a historical marker in Raytown at the corner of 63rd Street and Raytown Road showing the location of William Ray's shop.

In 1860, residents of Jackson County petitioned the county for a better road to connect southern Jackson County with Independence in northern Jackson County. The result was Raytown Road, which led north from High Grove Road, crossed the Little Blue River at the "rockford" (now inundated by Longview Lake) and joined the Santa Fe Trail at William Ray's blacksmith shop. Many portions of the original Raytown Road still are used today.

== Geography ==
According to the United States Census Bureau, the city has a total area of 9.97 square miles (25.82 km^{2}), of which 9.93 square miles (25.72 km^{2}) is land and 0.04 square miles (0.10 km^{2}) is water.

== Demographics ==
Historical population
Census	Pop.	Note	%±
1960	17,083		—
1970	33,632		96.9%
1980	31,831		−5.4%
1990	30,601		−3.9%
2000	30,388		−0.7%
2010	29,526		−2.8%
2020	30,012		1.6%
U.S. Decennial Census

=== Racial and ethnic composition ===
Raytown city, Missouri – Racial and ethnic composition Note: the US Census treats Hispanic/Latino as an ethnic category. This table excludes Latinos from the racial categories and assigns them to a separate category. Hispanics/Latinos may be of any race.
Race / Ethnicity (NH = Non-Hispanic)	Pop 2000	Pop 2010	Pop 2020	% 2000	% 2010	% 2020
White alone (NH)	25,233	19,274	15,443	83.04%	65.28%	51.46%
Black or African American alone (NH)	3,544	7,362	9,718	11.66%	24.93%	32.38%
Native American or Alaska Native alone (NH)	122	115	119	0.40%	0.39%	0.40%
Asian alone (NH)	229	297	326	0.75%	1.01%	1.09%
Native Hawaiian or Pacific Islander alone (NH)	46	52	61	0.15%	0.18%	0.20%
Other race alone (NH)	26	35	148	0.09%	0.12%	0.49%
Mixed race or Multiracial (NH)	476	878	1,869	1.57%	2.97%	6.23%
Hispanic or Latino (any race)	712	1,513	2,328	2.34%	5.12%	7.76%
Total	30,388	29,526	30,012	100.00%	100.00%	100.00%

=== 2020 census ===
As of the 2020 census, Raytown had a population of 30,012 and contained 12,597 households and 7,019 families; the population density was 3,022.4 per square mile (1,166.9/km^{2}).

The median age was 40.7 years. 21.3% of residents were under the age of 18 and 18.1% were 65 years of age or older. For every 100 females there were 88.4 males, and for every 100 females age 18 and over there were 85.6 males age 18 and over.

100.0% of residents lived in urban areas, while 0.0% lived in rural areas.

There were 12,597 households in Raytown, of which 27.0% had children under the age of 18 living in them. Of all households, 35.3% were married-couple households, 21.0% were households with a male householder and no spouse or partner present, and 35.9% were households with a female householder and no spouse or partner present. About 33.7% of all households were made up of individuals and 13.7% had someone living alone who was 65 years of age or older. The average household size was 2.3 and the average family size was 3.0.

There were 13,669 housing units, of which 7.8% were vacant. The homeowner vacancy rate was 2.1% and the rental vacancy rate was 9.8%.

Racial composition as of the 2020 census
Race	Number	Percent
White	16,007	53.3%
Black or African American	9,807	32.7%
American Indian and Alaska Native	155	0.5%
Asian	333	1.1%
Native Hawaiian and Other Pacific Islander	63	0.2%
Some other race	894	3.0%
Two or more races	2,753	9.2%

=== 2016–2020 American Community Survey ===
The 2016–2020 5-year American Community Survey estimates show that the median household income was $55,940 (with a margin of error of +/- $4,100) and the median family income was $71,461 (+/- $3,629). Males had a median income of $38,259 (+/- $4,989) versus $32,413 (+/- $1,439) for females. The median income for those above 16 years old was $34,618 (+/- $2,306). Approximately, 6.9% of families and 9.7% of the population were below the poverty line, including 18.0% of those under the age of 18 and 5.3% of those ages 65 or over.

=== 2010 census ===
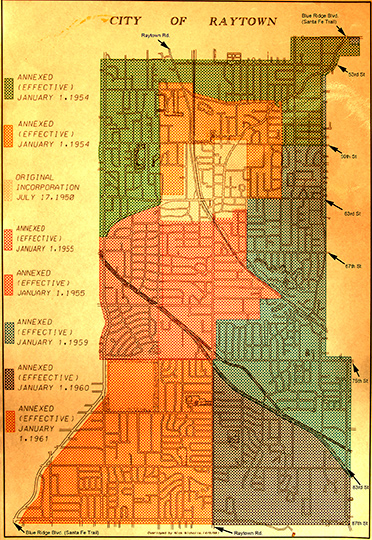
Raytown street map with annex dates

As of the census of 2010, there were 29,526 people, 12,104 households, and 7,701 families living in the city. The population density was 2,973.4 inhabitants per square mile (1,148.0/km^{2}). There were 13,276 housing units at an average density of 1,337.0 per square mile (516.2/km^{2}). The racial makeup of the city was 67.7% White, 25.1% African American, 0.5% Native American, 1.0% Asian, 0.2% Pacific Islander, 1.9% from other races, and 3.5% from two or more races. Hispanic or Latino of any race were 5.1% of the population.

There were 12,104 households, of which 30.3% had children under the age of 18 living with them, 41.4% were married couples living together, 16.9% had a female householder with no husband present, 5.3% had a male householder with no wife present, and 36.4% were non-families. 30.7% of all households were made up of individuals, and 12.3% had someone living alone who was 65 years of age or older. The average household size was 2.39 and the average family size was 2.97.

The median age in the city was 40.3 years. 23.1% of residents were under the age of 18; 8% were between the ages of 18 and 24; 24.9% were from 25 to 44; 27.8% were from 45 to 64; and 16.2% were 65 years of age or older. The gender makeup of the city was 47.3% male and 52.7% female.

=== 2000 census ===
As of the census of 2000, there were 30,388 people, 12,855 households, and 8,304 families living in the city. The population density was 3,065.9 inhabitants per square mile (1,183.8/km^{2}). There were 13,309 housing units at an average density of 1,342.8 per square mile (518.5/km^{2}). The racial makeup of the city was 84.2% White, 11.7% African American, 0.4% Native American, 0.8% Asian, 0.2% Pacific Islander, 0.9% from other races, and 1.9% from two or more races. Hispanic or Latino of any race were 2.3% of the population.

There were 12,855 households, out of which 27.1% had children under the age of 18 living with them, 48.6% were married couples living together, 12.6% had a female householder with no husband present, and 35.4% were non-families. 30.3% of all households were made up of individuals, and 13.3% had someone living alone who was 65 years of age or older. The average household size was 2.32 and the average family size was 2.88.

In the city, the population was spread out, with 22.6% under the age of 18, 7.8% from 18 to 24, 27.9% from 25 to 44, 22.5% from 45 to 64, and 19.3% who were 65 years of age or older. The median age was 40 years. For every 100 females, there were 88.7 males. For every 100 females age 18 and over, there were 83.6 males.

The median income for a household in the city was $41,949, and the median income for a family was $50,952. Males had a median income of $33,828 versus $26,745 for females. The per capita income for the city was $21,634. About 3.1% of families and 5.0% of the population were below the poverty line, including 6.0% of those under age 18 and 2.6% of those age 65 or over.

== Economy ==
=== Top employers ===
According to the town's 2014 Chamber of Commerce report, the top employers in the city are:

#	Employer	# of Employees
1	Raytown Quality Schools	1,300
2	Wal-Mart	400
3	Hy-Vee Food & Drug Store	350
4	USA 800	309
5	KCP&L	300
6	Stratford Development Corporation	235
7	KC Chiefs Football Club	192
8	Southeast Enterprises, Inc.	190
9	City of Raytown	153
10	Kansas City Zoo	151
11	H & H Color Lab	150
12	Cosentino's Food Stores	150
13	Blue Ridge Bank and Trust Co.	150
14	Two Rivers Behavioral Health System	149
15	Shamrock Cabinet & Fixtures Corp	100

== Education ==
The Raytown C-2 School District serves the vast majority of Raytown; But the very slim portion of the southern part of Raytown goes to the Hickman Mills C-1 School District.

The Raytown C-2 School District operates public schools, including Raytown High School and Raytown South High School.

Metropolitan Community College has the Raytown and Hickman Mills school districts in its taxation area.

Raytown has a public library, a branch of the Mid-Continent Public Library.

== In popular culture ==
The 1980s television series Mama's Family took place in the fictional location of Raytown, although the U.S. state where Raytown is located is never mentioned. Based on the accents, it was set in the South or Midwest.

== See also ==
- List of cities in Missouri
