= IU Indy Jaguars men's basketball statistical leaders =

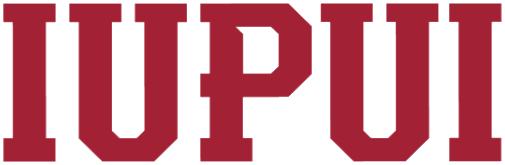

The IU Indy Jaguars men's basketball statistical leaders are individual statistical leaders of the IU Indy Jaguars men's basketball program in various categories, including points, rebounds, assists, steals, and blocks. Within those areas, the lists identify single-game, single-season, and career leaders. Since the 2024–25 college basketball season, the Jaguars have represented Indiana University Indianapolis in the NCAA Division I Horizon League. This followed the dissolution of Indiana University–Purdue University Indianapolis by the Indiana University and Purdue University systems at the end of the 2023–24 academic year and the establishment of separate IU- and Purdue-affiliated institutions. Shortly before the split became official, the athletic program's official website adopted a branding as IU Indy.

IU Indy began competing in intercollegiate basketball as IUPUI in 1972. The NCAA did not officially record assists as a stat until the 1983–84 season, and blocks and steals until the 1985–86 season, but IUPUI/IU Indy record books includes players in these stats before these seasons. These lists are updated through the end of the 2023–24 season.

== Scoring ==
Career
Rank	Player	Points	Seasons
1	Carlos Knox	2,556	1994–95 1995–96 1996–97 1997–98
2	Aldray Gibson	2,454	1983–84 1984–85 1985–86 1986–87
3	Alex Young	2,286	2008–09 2009–10 2010–11 2011–12
4	Jesse Bingham	1,928	1985–86 1986–87 1987–88 1988–89
5	George Hill	1,619	2004–05 2005–06 2006–07 2007–08
6	Jared Lux	1,558	1992–93 1993–94 1994–95 1995–96
7	Leroy Nobles	1,464	2007–08 2008–09 2009–10 2010–11
8	Kim King	1,447	1978–79 1979–80 1980–81 1981–82
9	Todd Schabel	1,395	1985–86 1986–87 1987–88 1988–89
10	Ron Angevine	1,373	1979–80 1980–81 1981–82 1982–83

Season
Rank	Player	Points	Season
1	Carlos Knox	927	1995–96
2	Aldray Gibson	863	1986–87
3	Carlos Knox	825	1994–95
4	Jesse Bingham	788	1988–89
5	Carlos Knox	781	1997–98
6	Jesse Bingham	728	1987–88
7	Robert Glenn	714	2009–10
8	George Hill	688	2007–08
9	Marcus Burk	682	2019–20
10	Odell Bradley	671	2003–04

Single game
Rank	Player	Points	Season	Opponent
1	Carlos Knox	51	1997–98	Ok-Panhandle St.
2	Carlos Knox	50	1995–96	Ind. Tech
3	Carlos Knox	46	1995–96	Central St.
	Carlos Knox	46	1994–95	Drury
5	Carlos Knox	45	1997–98	Drury
6	Alex Young	43	2011–12	W. Kentucky
	Rodney Thomas	43	1996–97	Wilberforce
	Carlos Knox	43	1995–96	Ind. Tech
9	Carlos Knox	42	1997–98	Ky. St.
	Carlos Knox	42	1995–96	Kentucky St.

== Rebounds ==
Career
Rank	Player	Rebounds	Seasons
1	Elyjah Goss	880	2017–18 2018–19 2019–20 2020–21
2	Don Carlisle	769	1997–98 1998–99 1999–00 2000–01
3	Brandon Cole	703	2002–03 2003–04 2004–05 2005–06
	Jesse Bingham	703	1985–86 1986–87 1987–88 1988–89
5	Charles Price	688	1997–98 1999–00 2000–01 2001–02
6	Alex Young	668	2008–09 2009–10 2010–11 2011–12
7	Tony Long	639	1987–88 1988–89 1989–90 1990–91
8	Billy Pettiford	632	2006–07 2007–08 2008–09 2009–10
9	Eric McKay	623	1981–82 1982–83 1983–84 1984–85
10	Evan Hall	602	2015–16 2016–17 2017–18 2018–19

Season
Rank	Player	Rebounds	Season
1	Elyjah Goss	369	2019–20
2	Dale Taylor	337	1975–76
3	Jesse Bingham	294	1988–89
4	Tony Long	289	1989–90
5	Eric McKay	286	1983–84
6	Anthony Winburn	254	1995–96
7	Odell Bradley	247	2003–04
8	Don Carlisle	246	2000–01
9	Sean Craig	245	2024–25
10	Josh Murray	243	2002–03
	Dale Taylor	243	1976–77

Single game
Rank	Player	Rebounds	Season	Opponent
1	Elyjah Goss	21	2019–20	Indiana South Bend
2	Michael Boles	20	1992–93	IUSB
	Austris Purvlicis	20	1974–75	IPFW
4	Lyonell Gains	19	2012–13	IU-NW
5	Elyjah Goss	18	2019–20	UIC
	Elyjah Goss	18	2019–20	Oakland
	Elyjah Goss	18	2019–20	Youngstown State
	Odell Bradley	18	2003–04	Ball State
	Rhett Dallas	18	1992–93	Ind. Tech
	Jesse Bingham	18	1987–88	Anderson
	Troy Fitts	18	1985–86	Marian

== Assists ==
Career
Rank	Player	Assists	Seasons
1	Matt Crenshaw	510	2000–01 2001–02 2002–03 2003–04
2	Scott Fath	490	1983–84 1984–85 1985–86 1986–87
3	Martin Reedus	399	1987–88 1988–89 1989–90
4	Greg Simmons	372	1988–89 1989–90 1990–91
5	Mike Landis	336	1983–84 1984–85 1985–86 1986–87
6	Jared Lux	333	1992–93 1993–94 1994–95 1995–96
7	Billy Pettiford	327	2006–07 2007–08 2008–09 2009–10
8	John Ashworth	323	2007–08 2008–09 2009–10 2010–11
9	George Hill	317	2004–05 2005–06 2006–07 2007–08
10	Eric McKay	306	1981–82 1982–83 1983–84 1984–85

Season
Rank	Player	Assists	Season
1	Finley Woodward	201	2025–26
2	Greg Simmons	194	1989–90
3	Scott Fath	183	1986–87
4	Matt Crenshaw	180	2003–04
5	John Ashworth	166	2009–10
6	Martin Reedus	160	1988–89
7	Martin Reedus	142	1989–90
8	Matt Crenshaw	140	2002–03
9	Matt Crenshaw	138	2001–02
10	George Hill	137	2007–08

Single game
Rank	Player	Assists	Season	Opponent
1	Finley Woodward	14	2025–26	Milwaukee
	Mike DePersia	14	2020–21	UIC
	Johnny Miller	14	2004–05	S. Utah
4	Kim King	13	1978–79	UT-Martin
5	John Ashworth	12	2009–10	Duquesne
	Brady Adkins	12	1995–96	Central St.
7	Billy Pettiford	11	2007–08	UMKC
	George Hill	11	2004–05	Chicago St.
	Matt Crenshaw	11	2003–04	IPFW
	Matt Crenshaw	11	2001–02	Ga. Tech
	Brady Adkins	11	1994–95	Drury
	Brady Adkins	11	1994–95	IPFW
	Scott Fath	11	1983–84	Thomas More
	Bob Woodford	11	1975–76	Oakland City

== Steals ==
Career
Rank	Player	Steals	Seasons
1	Carlos Knox	204	1994–95 1995–96 1996–97 1997–98
2	Aldray Gibson	175	1983–84 1984–85 1985–86 1986–87
3	Derek Williams	174	1996–97 1997–98 1998–99 1999–00
4	Alex Young	173	2008–09 2009–10 2010–11 2011–12
5	Billy Pettiford	167	2006–07 2007–08 2008–09 2009–10
6	Don Carlisle	165	1997–98 1998–99 1999–00 2000–01
	Jesse Bingham	165	1985–86 1986–87 1987–88 1988–89
8	Marcellus Barksdale	160	2011–12 2012–13 2013–14 2014–15 2015–16
9	Matt Crenshaw	157	2000–01 2001–02 2002–03 2003–04
10	Todd Schabel	156	1985–86 1986–87 1987–88 1988–89

Season
Rank	Player	Steals	Season
1	Billy Pettiford	77	2009–10
2	Mike Archer	73	1993–94
	Aldray Gibson	73	1986–87
4	Carlos Knox	71	1995–96
5	Brady Adkins	70	1994–95
6	Carlos Knox	69	1996–97
7	Todd Schabel	68	1988–89
8	Lamar Morton	64	1993–94
9	Carlos Knox	63	1997–98
10	Greg Simmons	62	1989–90
	Jesse Bingham	62	1988–89

Single game
Rank	Player	Steals	Season	Opponent
1	Derek Williams	11	1998–99	Virgin Islands
2	Mike Archer	9	1993–94	Drury
3	Matt Crenshaw	8	2002–03	Chicago St.
	Brady Adkins	8	1995–96	St. Francis [Ind.]

== Blocks ==
Career
Rank	Player	Blocks	Seasons
1	Charles Price	165	1997–98 1999–00 2000–01 2001–02
2	David Dickey	118	1994–95 1995–96 1996–97 1997–98
3	Robert Glenn	100	2008–09 2009–10
4	Evan Hall	93	2015–16 2016–17 2017–18 2018–19
5	Alex Young	89	2008–09 2009–10 2010–11 2011–12
6	Mitch Patton	88	2010–11 2011–12 2012–13 2013–14
7	Billy Pettiford	83	2006–07 2007–08 2008–09 2009–10
8	Jon Avery	82	2006–07 2007–08 2008–09 2009–10
	Elyjah Goss	82	2017–18 2018–19 2019–20 2020–21
10	Angelo Smith	71	2005–06 2006–07

Season
Rank	Player	Blocks	Season
1	Charles Price	58	2000–01
2	Robert Glenn	50	2009–10
	Robert Glenn	50	2008–09
4	Keith Nye	49	1975–76
5	Marcus Fisher	41	1988–89
6	Billy Pettiford	39	2009–10
	David Dickey	39	1996–97
	Anthony Winburn	39	1995–96
9	Angelo Smith	38	2006–07
	Charles Price	38	2001–02
	Charles Price	38	1999–00

Single game
Rank	Player	Blocks	Season	Opponent
1	Jonah Carrasco	7	2021–22	East-West University
	John Hester	7	1996–97	Ind. Tech
3	Elyjah Goss	6	2019–20	Milwaukee
	Charles Price	6	2000–01	Ind. St.
	Charles Price	6	2000–01	Wilberforce
