= 2008–09 UMKC Kangaroos men's basketball team =

American college basketball season

2008–09 UMKC Kangaroos men's basketball
- Conference: The Summit League
- Record: 7–24, 2 wins vacated (3–15 Summit, 2 wins vacated)
- Head coach: Matt Brown (2nd season)
- Assistant coaches: Ed Kohtala (2nd season); Martin Unger (2nd season); Wendell Moore (1st season)
- Home arena: Municipal Auditorium, Kemper Arena, Swinney Recreation Center

2008–09 Summit League men's basketball standings
	Conf.				Overall
Team	W		L	PCT	W		L	PCT
North Dakota State †	16	–	2	.889	26	–	7	.788
Oral Roberts	14	–	4	.778	16	–	15	.516
Oakland	13	–	5	.722	23	–	13	.639
IUPUI	9	–	9	.500	16	–	14	.533
Southern Utah	8	–	10	.444	11	–	20	.355
IPFW	8	–	10	.444	13	–	17	.433
South Dakota State	7	–	11	.389	13	–	20	.394
Centenary	6	–	12	.333	8	–	23	.258
Western Illinois	6	–	12	.333	9	–	20	.310
UMKC	3	–	15	.167	7	–	24	.226
† Summit League Tournament winner Rankings from AP Poll

The 2008–09 UMKC Kangaroos men's basketball team represented the University of Missouri–Kansas City during the 2008–09 NCAA Division I men's basketball season. The Kangaroos played most their home games off-campus, at Municipal Auditorium (with two at Kemper Arena), plus one on-campus at Swinney Recreation Center in Kansas City, Missouri, as a member of The Summit League.

== Previous season ==
The Kangaroos finished the 2007–08 season with a record of 9–21 overall, 4–12 in The Summit League to finish in eight place.

== Roster ==
2008–09 UMKC Kangaroos men's basketball team
Players
Coaches

Pos.	#	Name	Height	Weight	Year	Previous school	Hometown
F	3	Dane Brumagin	6 ft 4 in (1.93 m)	195 lb (88 kg)	Sr	Warrenton Christian HS	Montgomery City, MO
F	15	Jay Cousinard (redshirt)	6 ft 6 in (1.98 m)	190 lb (86 kg)	Jr	Evansville; Jack Yates Senior HS/ Westbury Christian	Houston, TX
F	25	Daniel Brady	6 ft 7 in (2.01 m)	220 lb (100 kg)	So	North Idaho; Lakeridge HS	Lake Oswego, OR
G	23	Reggie Hamilton	6 ft 0 in (1.83 m)	175 lb (79 kg)	So	Thornwood HS	Harvey, IL
F	1	James Humphrey	6 ft 7 in (2.01 m)	200 lb (91 kg)	So	Fork Union Military; Paul Harding HS	Fort Wayne, IN
F	5	Spencer Johnson	6 ft 6 in (1.98 m)	210 lb (95 kg)	So	Laurinburg Institute/ Champaign Central HS	Champaign, IL
G	14	Bakari Lewis	6 ft 1 in (1.85 m)	175 lb (79 kg)	So	Nicholls State; IMG/ Shaker Heights HS	Cleveland, OH
G	55	Fred Ford	5 ft 11 in (1.8 m)	175 lb (79 kg)	RS Fr	Ware Prep/ South Side HS	Fort Wayne, IN
F	20	Femi Akinpetide	6 ft 6 in (1.98 m)	220 lb (100 kg)	Fr	Montverde	Sydney, Australia
G	12	Dustin Dibble	6 ft 4 in (1.93 m)	190 lb (86 kg)	Fr	Petoskey HS	Petoskey, MI
G	2	Patrick Inyard	6 ft 2 in (1.88 m)	185 lb (84 kg)	Fr	Highland Park HS	Topeka, KS
G	22	Trey McKinney-Jones	6 ft 4 in (1.93 m)	195 lb (88 kg)	Fr	South Milwaukee HS	Bay View, WI
F	4	LaTreze Mushatt	6 ft 5 in (1.96 m)	210 lb (95 kg)	Fr	Arthur Hill HS	Saginaw, MI

Head coach

- Matt Brown (Shippensburg)

Assistant coach(es)

- Ed Kohtala (Maine)
- Martin Unger (Western Carolina)
- Wendell Moore (Georgia Southern)

Legend

- (C) Team captain
- (S) Suspended
- (I) Ineligible
- (W) Walk-on
- (5Y) Fifth-year Senior
- Injured
- Current redshirt

Roster
Last update: November 3, 2024

== Schedule & Results ==
Date time, TV	Rank^{#}	Opponent^{#}	Result	Record	High points	High rebounds	High assists	Site (attendance) city, state
Regular Season
November 14, 2008*; 8:05 PM, Metro Sports		North Dakota	L 56–61	0–1	22 – Hamilton	6 – Humphrey; Johnson	3 – Hamilton	Swinney Recreation Center (1,664); Kansas City, MO
November 16, 2008*; 7:00 PM, ESPNU		at No. 23 Kansas; O'Reilly Auto Parts CBE Classic; Lawrence Regional	L 56–71	0–2	14 – Brumagin	10 – Mushatt	3 – McKinney-Jones	Allen Fieldhouse (16,300); Lawrence, KS
November 19, 2008*; 7:00 PM, Metro Sports		at Wichita State	W 66–63	1–2	14 – Johnson	5 – Humphrey, Johnson	4 – Hamilton	Charles Koch Arena (10,282); Wichita, KS
November 22, 2008*; 6:00 PM		at Florida Atlantic	L 59–77	1–3	22 – Hamilton	6 – Hamilton, Johnson	5 – Hamilton	FAU Arena (873); Boca Raton, FL
November 24, 2008*; 4:00 PM, Comcast SportsNet		vs. Bradley; O'Reilly Auto Parts CBE Classic; Fort Myers Subregional [Round–Robin]	W 73–61	2–3	20 – Hamilton	8 – McKinney-Jones	6 – Hamilton	Alico Arena (1,205); Fort Myers, FL
November 25, 2008*; 4:00 PM		vs. Richmond; O'Reilly Auto Parts CBE Classic; Fort Myers Subregional [Round–Robin]	L 74–85	2–4	26 – Brumagin	4 – Brumagin, Johnson, Mushatt	6 – Hamilton	Alico Arena (742); Fort Myers, FL
November 26, 2008*; 6:00 PM		at Florida Gulf Coast; O'Reilly Auto Parts CBE Classic; Fort Myers Subregional [Round–Robin]	W 73–69	3–4	22 – Hamilton	8 – Mushatt	7 – Hamilton	Alico Arena (1,143); Fort Myers, FL
November 30, 2008*; 12:00 PM, Sun Sports		vs. No. 17 Florida	L 65–86	3–5	16 – Brumagin	8 – Mushatt	4 – Hamilton	Amway Arena (7,115); Orlando, FL
December 4, 2008; 7:05 PM, Metro Sports		Oakland	L 78–84	3–6 (0–1)	29 – Brumagin	13 – Johnson	9 – Hamilton	Municipal Auditorium (1,412); Kansas City, MO
December 6, 2008; 7:05 PM		IPFW	W 70–62	4–6 (1–1)	28 – Brumagin	10 – Johnson	3 – Hamilton	Municipal Auditorium (3,699); Kansas City, MO
December 13, 2008*; 3:00 PM, Metro Sports		at Loyola Chicago	L 47–52	4–7	16 – Brumagin	14 – Johnson	4 – Hamilton	Joseph J. Gentile Center (2,437); Chicago, IL
December 15, 2008*; 7:00 PM, BTN		at Northwestern	L 62–77	4–8	22 – Johnson	12 – Johnson	8 – Hamilton	Welsh–Ryan Arena (3,124); Evanston, IL
December 18, 2008*; 9:00 PM		at Eastern Washington	W 68–61	5–8	23 – Johnson	11 – Johnson	8 – Lewis	Special Events Pavilion (1,142); Cheney, WA
December 22, 2008*; 7:05 PM, Metro Sports		UTSA	L 72–76	5–9	26 – Brumagin	8 – Ford	4 – Hamilton, Ford	Municipal Auditorium (1,358); Kansas City, MO
December 28, 2008*; 2:05 PM, Metro Sports		SIU Edwardsville	L 71–77	5–10	34 – Brumagin	8 – Johnson	5 – Lewis	Municipal Auditorium (1,479); Kansas City, MO
December 31, 2008; 12:00 PM		at IUPUI	L 69–72	5–11 (1–2)	23 – Brumagin	10 – Johnson	4 – Brumagin	IUPUI Gymnasium (968); Indianapolis, IN
January 2, 2009; 7:00 PM		at Western Illinois	L 68–71	5–12 (1–3)	15 – Brumagin, Ford	11 – Mushatt	3 – Brumagin, Hamilton	Western Hall (1,103); Macomb, IL
January 10, 2009; 7:05 PM		Southern Utah	L 50–66	5–13 (1–4)	20 – Brumagin	12 – Johnson	3 – Lewis	Municipal Auditorium (1,433); Kansas City, MO
January 15, 2009; 7:05 PM, Metro Sports		South Dakota State	W 69–67	VACATED (League; Sanction)	19 – Brumagin	6 – Johnson, Mushatt	3 – Brumagin, Lewis	Municipal Auditorium (1,260); Kansas City, MO
January 17, 2009; 7:05 PM		North Dakota State	L 60–65 ^{OT}	5–14 (1–5)	15 – Mushatt	8 – Johnson, Mushatt	4 – Ford	Municipal Auditorium (1,739); Kansas City, MO
January 22, 2009; 7:05 PM, Metro Sports		at Oral Roberts	L 54–89	5–15 (1–6)	13 – Lewis	6 – McKinney-Jones	4 – Ford	Mabee Center (4,235); Tulsa, OK
January 24, 2009; 2:30 PM		at Centenary	L 75–83	5–16 (1–7)	16 – Humphrey	9 – McKinney-Jones	4 – Ford	Gold Dome (781); Shreveport, LA
January 29, 2009; 7:05 PM, Metro Sports		Western Illinois	L 51–56	5–17 (1–8)	12 – McKinney-Jones	7 – Johnson, Mushatt	3 – Ford	Kemper Arena (1,346); Kansas City, MO
January 31, 2009; 7:05 PM		IUPUI	L 56–60	5–18 (1–9)	23 – Lewis	7 – Johnson, Mushatt	4 – Lewis, Mushatt	Kemper Arena (3,145); Kansas City, MO
February 7, 2009; 8:00 PM		at Southern Utah	L 69–81	5–19 (1–10)	23 – Lewis	5 – Mushatt	2 – Lewis	Centrum Arena (2,133); Cedar City, UT
February 12, 2009; 7:00 PM		at North Dakota State	L 49–87	5–20 (1–11)	12 – Mushatt	5 – Brady, Humphrey, Mushatt	2 – Brady, Humphrey, Ford, McKnney-Jones	Bison Sports Arena (3,633); Fargo, ND
February 14, 2009; 7:30 PM		at South Dakota State	L 66–76	5–21 (1–12)	18 – Mushatt	7 – McKinney-Jones	2 – Johnson, McKinney-Jones	Frost Arena (4,254); Brookings, SD
February 19, 2009; 7:05 PM, Metro Sports		Centenary	W 61–59	VACATED (League; Sanction)	14 – Lewis	11 – McKinney-Jones	3 – Lewis, Ford	Municipal Auditorium (1,328); Kansas City, MO
February 21, 2009; 7:05 PM, Metro Sports		Oral Roberts	L 62–93	5–22 (1–13)	16 – Brumagin	7 – McKinney-Jones	4 – Ford	Municipal Auditorium (2,402); Kansas City, MO
February 26, 2009; 6:00 PM		at IPFW	L 71–76	5–23 (1–14)	17 – Lewis	8 – Humphrey	6 – Lewis	Allen County; War Memorial Coliseum (1,750); Fort Wayne, IN
February 28, 2009; 5:00 PM		at Oakland	L 88–100	5–24 (1–15)	24 – Johnson	8 – Johnson	4 – Lewis	Athletics Center O'rena (3,875); Auburn Hills, MI
*Non-conference game. ^{#}Rankings from AP Poll. (#) Tournament seedings in parentheses. All times are in Central Standard Time (CST).

Source
NOTE: The Summit League vacated (as opposed to forfeited) the victories of January 15 and February 19, resulting in neither a loss or win being reflected in the official league and overall record for those games.
