= 2002–03 UMKC Kangaroos men's basketball team =

American college basketball season

2002–03 UMKC Kangaroos men's basketball
- Conference: Mid–Continent Conference
- Record: 9–20 (7–7 Mid–Con)
- Head coach: Rich Zvosec (2nd season)
- Associate head coach: Ken Dempsey (2nd season)
- Assistant coach: Jason Ivey (3rd season)
- Home arena: Municipal Auditorium, Hale Arena

2002–03 Mid-Continent Conference men's basketball standings
	Conf.				Overall
Team	W		L	PCT	W		L	PCT
Valparaiso	12	–	2	.857	20	–	11	.645
IUPUI †	10	–	4	.714	20	–	14	.588
Oakland	10	–	4	.714	17	–	11	.607
Oral Roberts	9	–	5	.643	18	–	10	.643
UMKC	7	–	7	.500	9	–	20	.310
Southern Utah	5	–	9	.357	11	–	17	.393
Western Illinois	3	–	11	.214	7	–	21	.250
Chicago State	0	–	14	.000	3	–	27	.100
† 2003 Mid-Con Tournament winner Rankings from AP Poll

The 2002–03 UMKC Kangaroos men's basketball team represented the University of Missouri–Kansas City during the 2002–03 NCAA Division I men's basketball season. The Kangaroos played their home games off-campus, most at Municipal Auditorium (with five at Hale Arena) in Kansas City, Missouri, as a member of the Mid–Continent Conference.

== Previous season ==
The Kangaroos finished the 2001–02 season with a record of 18–11 overall, 7–7 in the Mid–Continent Conference to finish in fifth place.

== Roster ==
2002–03 UMKC Kangaroos men's basketball team
Players
Coaches

Pos.	#	Name	Height	Weight	Year	Previous school	Hometown
G	5	Randall Atchison	6 ft 5 in (1.96 m)	202 lb (92 kg)	Sr	Piper HS	Fort Lauderdale, FL
F	50	Tom Curtis	6 ft 9 in (2.06 m)	225 lb (102 kg)	Sr	Grand Rapids CC; Garden City HS	Garden City, MI
G	12	Marc Stricker	6 ft 4 in (1.93 m)	190 lb (86 kg)	Sr	Christian Brothers College HS	St. Louis, MO
F	20	Jeffrey Bramble	6 ft 8 in (2.03 m)	235 lb (107 kg)	Jr	Southeast CC; Basseterre HS	Saint Christopher, West Indies
G	11	Javon Clark	6 ft 1 in (1.85 m)	180 lb (82 kg)	Jr		Detroit, MI
C	45	Randall Logan	6 ft 10 in (2.08 m)	300 lb (136 kg)	Jr	Shaw; James Madison University HS	Milwaukee, WI
F	22	Michael Watson	6 ft 4 in (1.93 m)	185 lb (84 kg)	Jr	Central HS	Kansas City, MO
C	32	Carlton Aaron	6 ft 9 in (2.06 m)	322 lb (146 kg)	RS So	Temple; The Winchendon/ Atlantic Shores Christian	Bronx, NY
C	54	Dan Leadbetter	6 ft 10 in (2.08 m)	265 lb (120 kg)	So	Abingdon-Avon HS	Abingdon, IL
F	34	James Williams	6 ft 8 in (2.03 m)	195 lb (88 kg)	So	William E. Grady HS	Brooklyn, NY
F	15	Brandon Lipsey	6 ft 8 in (2.03 m)	200 lb (91 kg)	RS Fr	Sumner Arts And Science	Kansas City, KS
G	3	Charlie McDonald	6 ft 0 in (1.83 m)	165 lb (75 kg)	Fr	Lafayette HS	St. Joseph, MO

Head coach

- Rich Zvosec (Defiance)

Assistant coach(es)

- Ken Dempsey (Moravian)
- Jason Ivey (Temple)

Legend

- (C) Team captain
- (S) Suspended
- (I) Ineligible
- (W) Walk-on
- (5Y) Fifth-year Senior
- Injured
- Current redshirt

Roster
Last update: November 3, 2024

== Schedule & Results ==
Date time, TV	Rank^{#}	Opponent^{#}	Result	Record	High points	High rebounds	High assists	Site (attendance) city, state
Regular Season
November 22, 2002*; 7:00 PM		Robert Morris	L 77–83	0–1	37 – Watson	7 – Aaron, Williams	4 – Atchison, Clark	Municipal Auditorium (2,583); Kansas City, MO
November 26, 2002*; 6:30 PM		at Norfolk State	L 60–61	0–2	23 – Watson	12 – Aaron	2 – Watson	Joseph G. Echols; Memorial Hall (753); Norfolk, VA
December 3, 2002*; 8:00 PM		at Denver	L 66–83	0–3	33 – Watson	8 – Aaron	2 – Watson	Magness Arena (670); Denver, CO
December 7, 2002*; 1:00 PM		Colorado	L 59–62	0–4	36 – Watson	8 – Aaron	2 – Atchison, McDonald	Municipal Auditorium (3,843); Kansas City, MO
December 10, 2002*; 7:00 PM		at Loyola–Chicago	L 75–86	0–5	28 – Watson	12 – Aaron	9 – Watson	Joseph J. Gentile Center (2,287); Chicago, IL
December 14, 2002*; 7:00 PM		Southeast Missouri State	L 58–66	0–6	28 – Watson	10 – Aaron	5 – Watson	Municipal Auditorium (4,187); Kansas City, MO
December 18, 2002*; 7:00 PM		at Oklahoma State	L 61–85	0–7	28 – Watson	10 – Aaron, Lipsey	3 – Watson	Gallagher–Iba Arena (7,341); Stillwater, OK
December 22, 2002*; 7:00 PM		Youngstown State	W 71–59	1–7	22 – Watson	20 – Aaron	5 – Watson	Municipal Auditorium (3,183); Kansas City, MO
December 27, 2002*; 5:30 PM		vs. Idaho State; Gossner Foods Holiday Classic [Semifinal]	L 61–75	1–8	22 – Watson	12 – Aaron	4 – McDonald	Dee Glen Smith Spectrum (8,028); Logan, UT
December 28, 2002*; 5:30 PM		vs. Arkansas State; Gossner Foods Holiday Classic [Consolation Final]	L 56–71	1–9	21 – Watson	8 – Aaron	5 – Watson	Dee Glen Smith Spectrum (8,355); Logan, UT
December 31, 2002*; 1:00 PM		Monmouth	L 61–64	1–10	17 – Williams	11 – Lipsey	4 – Watson	Municipal Auditorium (2,342); Kansas City, MO
January 4, 2003*; 2:00 PM		vs. No. 18 Kansas; Feist Shootout	L 46–100	1–11	27 – Watson	5 – Lipsey	2 – Watson	Kemper Arena (13,433); Kansas City, MO
January 9, 2003; 7:00 PM		at Chicago State	W 61–48	2–11 (1–0)	17 – Aaron	8 – Curtis	4 – Atchison	Jacoby D. Dickens Physical; Education and Athletics Center (323); Chicago, IL
January 11, 2003; 8:35 PM		at Southern Utah	L 78–82	2–12 (1–1)	24 – Watson	6 – Aaron	10 – Stricker	Centrum Arena (2,933); Cedar City, UT
January 16, 2003; 7:00 PM		Oakland	L 65–86	2–13 (1–2)	25 – Watson	9 – Lipsey	8 – Stricker	Hale Arena (1,243); Kansas City, MO
January 18, 2003; 7:00 PM		Indiana/Purdue–Indianapolis	L 65–74	2–14 (1–3)	19 – Watson	6 – Aaron	6 – Stricker	Hale Arena (2,121); Kansas City, MO
January 22, 2003*; 7:05 PM		at Southwest Missouri State	L 65–78	2–15	26 – Watson	10 – Lipsey	5 – Watson	John Q. Hammons; Student Center (4,546); Springfield, MO
January 25, 2003; 7:00 PM		Oral Roberts	L 62–76	2–16 (1–4)	25 – Watson	9 – Lipsey	6 – Watson	Hale Arena (2,357); Kansas City, MO
January 30, 2003; 7:00 PM		at Western Illinois	W 78–71	3–16 (2–4)	26 – Watson	5 – Watson	7 – Watson	Western Hall (1,121); Macomb, IL
February 1, 2003; 7:05 PM		at Valparaiso	W 71–68 ^{OT}	4–16 (3–4)	24 – Watson	9 – Lipsey	5 – Stricker, Watson	Athletics–Recreation Center (4,932); Valparaiso, IN
February 6, 2003; 7:00 PM		Southern Utah	W 91–69	5–16 (4–4)	37 – Watson	10 – Aaron	7 – Watson	Hale Arena (1,727); Kansas City, MO
February 8, 2003; 7:00 PM		Chicago State	W 59–56	6–16 (5–4)	19 – Watson	9 – Aaron	4 – Stricker	Hale Arena (2,987); Kansas City, MO
February 13, 2003; 6:00 PM		at Indiana/Purdue–Indianapolis	L 61–73	6–17 (5–5)	25 – Watson	6 – Williams	3 – Lipsey	IUPUI Gymnasium (1,127); Indianapolis, IN
February 15, 2003; 11:00 AM		at Oakland	L 79–100	6–18 (5–6)	15 – Clark, Watson, Aaron, Williams	8 – Aaron	4 – Sticker	Athletics Center O'rena (1,205); Auburn Hills, MI
February 22, 2003; 7:05 PM		at Oral Roberts	W 91–86 ^{2OT}	7–18 (6–6)	54 – Watson	9 – Aaron	4 – Stricker	Mabee Center (6,438); Tulsa, OK
February 27, 2003; 7:00 PM		Valparaiso	L 63–75	7–19 (6–7)	15 – Stricker, Watson	10 – Aaron	5 – Strciker	Municipal Auditorium (4,143); Kansas City, MO
March 1, 2003; 7:00 PM		Western Illinois	W 83–79	8–19 (7–7)	27 – Watson	6 – Watson, Lipsey	9 – Stricker	Municipal Auditorium (3,581); Kansas City, MO
Conference Tournament
March 9, 2003*	(5)	vs. (4) Oral Roberts [Quarterfinal]	W 76–73	9–19	34 – Watson	9 – Aaron	6 – Stricker	Kemper Arena (3,547); Kansas City, MO
March 10, 2003*; 6:00 PM	(5)	vs. (1) Valparaiso [Semifinal]	L 50–71	9–20	21 – Watson	7 – Lipsey	4 – Stricker, Watson	Kemper Arena (5,341); Kansas City, MO
*Non-conference game. ^{#}Rankings from AP Poll. (#) Tournament seedings in parentheses. All times are in Central Standard Time (CST).
