= 2008–09 Oakland Golden Grizzlies men's basketball team =

American college basketball season

2008–09 Oakland Golden Grizzlies men's basketball

CIT, Quarterfinals, L, Bradley 75-76
- Conference: The Summit League
- Record: 23–13 (13–5 Summit)
- Head coach: Greg Kampe
- Assistant coaches: Jeff Tungate; Darren Sorenson; Saddi Washington
- Home arena: Athletics Center O'rena

2008–09 Summit League men's basketball standings
	Conf.				Overall
Team	W		L	PCT	W		L	PCT
North Dakota State †	16	–	2	.889	26	–	7	.788
Oral Roberts	14	–	4	.778	16	–	15	.516
Oakland	13	–	5	.722	23	–	13	.639
IUPUI	9	–	9	.500	16	–	14	.533
Southern Utah	8	–	10	.444	11	–	20	.355
IPFW	8	–	10	.444	13	–	17	.433
South Dakota State	7	–	11	.389	13	–	20	.394
Centenary	6	–	12	.333	8	–	23	.258
Western Illinois	6	–	12	.333	9	–	20	.310
UMKC	3	–	15	.167	7	–	24	.226
† Summit League Tournament winner Rankings from AP Poll

The 2008–09 Oakland Golden Grizzlies men's basketball team was a National Collegiate Athletic Association Division I college basketball team representing Oakland University.

Oakland was picked to finish third in The Summit League's preseason poll. Oral Roberts was voted to finish first and North Dakota State second. However, only eight votes separated the three teams. Senior forward Derick Nelson and junior guard Johnathon Jones were named to the Preseason All-League First Team. Senior guard Erik Kangas was named to the Second Team.

Prior to the first game of the year against Cleveland State, senior forward Derick Nelson suffered a foot injury and sat out most of the season. Nelson played in two games against Eastern Michigan and Michigan State, but did not record a point and took a medical redshirt. Oakland lost their first game against CSU and defeated Pacific-10 Conference opponent Oregon for the second year in a row.

== Roster ==
No.	Name	Pos.	Height	Weight	Year	Hometown (Previous school)
34	Keith Benson	C	6'11"	225	So.	Farmington Hills, MI (Country Day)
21	Ricky Bieszki	G	6'2"	190	Sr.	Shelby Township, MI (Notre Dame Preparatory)
22	Blake Cushingberry	G	6'4"	225	Fr.	Romeo, MI (Romeo)
4	Will Hudson	F	6'9"	225	So.	Madison, WI (Middleton)
23	Johnathon Jones	G	5'11"	165	Jr.	Okemos, MI (Okemos)
30	Erik Kangas	G	6'3"	205	Sr.	DeWitt, MI (DeWitt)
32	John Kast	G	6'2"	175	Jr.	Clarkston, MI (Clarkston)
31	Drew Maynard	G	6'7"	220	Fr.	Lake Orion, MI (Lake Orion)
20	Ilija Milutinovic	C	7'0"	255	Fr.	Niš, Serbia (Milestone Christian Academy (MO))
1	Derick Nelson *	F	6'5"	235	Sr.	Lansing, MI (Bridgton Academy)
12	Matt Samuels	G	6'0"	215	Fr.	Washington, D.C. (Patterson)
44	Jay Thames *	F	6'9"	220	Fr.	Port Huron, MI (Port Huron Northern)
45	Dan Waterstradt	C	6'10"	240	Sr.	Dearborn Heights, MI (Rutgers)
2	Larry Wright *	G	6'2"	172	Jr.	Saginaw, MI (St. John's)

* Redshirting 2008–2009 season

== Awards ==
- Keith Benson
  - Summit League Player of the Week
    - Week 12 – Averaged 15.5 points, 12.5 rebounds, 5.5 blocks, 2.5 assists and 1.5 steals per game and shot 82.4 percent (14–17) for the week.
- Johnathon Jones
  - Summit League Player of the Week (2)
    - Week 2 – Averaged 23.0 points, 5.0 rebounds, 3.7 assists and 1.7 steals against Oregon, Syracuse and Iowa.
    - Week 13 – Averaging 15.0 points and 12.5 assists per game against Oral Roberts and Centenary.
- Erik Kangas
  - Summit League Player of the Week (2)
    - Week 10 – Career-high 39-point game that included 8–13 shooting from three-point range in victory at IPFW.
    - Week 11 – Averaged 30.0 points and 7.5 three-pointers per game. Kangas shot 65% from three-point range. Kangas was the first player to earn back-to-back player of the week awards since the 2004–2005 season.

== Milestones ==
- Erik Kangas set the Oakland record for career three-pointers made
- Keith Benson set the Oakland record for single-game blocks with eight
- Keith Benson set the Oakland record for single-season blocks

== Schedule ==
Date time, TV	Rank^{#}	Opponent^{#}	Result	Record	Site (attendance) city, state
November 15, 2008*; 7:00pm		at Cleveland State	L 55-58	0–1	Wolstein Center (2,078); Cleveland, OH
November 17, 2008*; 10:00pm, CSN Northwest		at Oregon	W 82–79 ^{OT}	1–1	McArthur Court (7,924); Eugene, OR
November 21, 2008*; 7:00pm, Time Warner Sports		at Syracuse	L 66-86	1–2	Carrier Dome (18,932); Syracuse, NY
November 23, 2008*; 6:05pm, Big Ten Network		at Iowa; Las Vegas Invitational	L 57-66	1–3	Carver-Hawkeye Arena (8,079); Iowa City, IA
November 25, 2008*; 8:00pm, FSN Kansas City		at Kansas State; Las Vegas Invitational	L 64-83	1–4	Bramlage Coliseum (8,356); Manhattan, KS
November 28, 2008*; 6:30pm		vs. Delaware State; Las Vegas Invitational	W 75–70	2–4	Orleans Arena (2,067); Las Vegas, NV
November 29, 2008*; 5:00pm		vs. Southeast Missouri State; Las Vegas Invitational	W 81–63	3–4	Orleans Arena (N/A); Las Vegas, NV
December 2, 2008; 9:00pm		at Southern Utah	L 66-82	3–5 (0–1)	Centrum Arena (2,059); Cedar City, UT
December 4, 2008; 8:00pm, Metro Sports		at UMKC	W 84–78	4–5 (1–1)	Municipal Auditorium (1,412); Kansas City, MO
December 7, 2008*; 1:00pm		Toledo	W 67–58	5–5	Athletics Center O'rena (2,315); Rochester, MI
December 14, 2008*; 4:00pm		Rochester	W 88–54	6–5	Athletics Center O'rena (2,125); Rochester, MI
December 18, 2008*; 8:00pm, WACY		at Green Bay	W 79–76 ^{OT}	7–5	Resch Center (2,587); Green Bay, WI
December 20, 2008*; 4:00pm, FSN Detroit		vs. Michigan	L 76-89	7–6	The Palace of Auburn Hills (10,113); Auburn Hills, MI
December 22, 2008*; 7:00pm		at Eastern Michigan	W 66–53	8–6	Convocation Center (389); Ypsilanti, MI
December 27, 2008*; 5:00pm, Fox College Sports		vs. No. 11 Michigan State	L 66-82	8–7	The Palace of Auburn Hills (15,361); Auburn Hills, MI
December 31, 2008; 4:00pm		South Dakota State	W 86–81	9–7 (2–1)	Athletics Center O'rena (2,165); Rochester, MI
January 2, 2009; 7:00pm		North Dakota State	W 77–76	10–7 (3–1)	Athletics Center O'rena (2,665); Rochester, MI
January 8, 2009; 9:00pm		at Centenary	L 60-80	10–8 (3–2)	Gold Dome (775); Shreveport, LA
January 10, 2009; 8:05pm, Fox College Sports		at Oral Roberts	L 65-68 ^{OT}	10–9 (3–3)	Mabee Center (5,354); Tulsa, OK
January 17, 2009; 7:00pm		at IPFW	W 93–88	11–9 (4–3)	Allen County War Memorial Coliseum (2,650); Fort Wayne, IN
January 22, 2009; 7:00pm, FSN Detroit		IUPUI	W 75–57	12–9 (5–3)	Athletics Center O'rena (2,805); Rochester, MI
January 24, 2009; 6:00pm		Western Illinois	W 86–46	13–9 (6–3)	Athletics Center O'rena (3,125); Rochester, MI
January 29, 2009; 8:30pm		at North Dakota State	L 71-81	13–10 (6–4)	Bison Sports Arena (4,552); Fargo, ND
January 31, 2009; 8:30pm		at South Dakota State	L 68-74 ^{OT}	13–11 (6–5)	Frost Arena (5,740); Brookings, SD
February 5, 2009; 7:00pm		Oral Roberts	W 81–69	14–11 (7–5)	Athletics Center O'rena (2,355); Rochester, MI
February 7, 2009; 6:00pm		Centenary	W 78–65	15–11 (8–5)	Athletics Center O'rena (3,855); Rochester, MI
February 14, 2009; 6:00pm		IPFW	W 83–72	16–11 (9–5)	Athletics Center O'rena (2,905); Rochester, MI
February 19, 2009; 8:00pm, WIU TV		at Western Illinois	W 77–52	17–11 (10–5)	Western Hall (878); Macomb, IL
February 21, 2009; 7:00pm		at IUPUI	W 81–76	18–11 (11–5)	IUPUI Gymnasium (1,215); Indianapolis, IN
February 26, 2009; 7:00pm		Southern Utah	W 78–62	19–11 (12–5)	Athletics Center O'rena (2,365); Rochester, MI
February 28, 2009; 6:00pm		UMKC	W 100–88	20–11 (13–5)	Athletics Center O'rena (3,875); Rochester, MI
March 8, 2009; 9:30pm		vs. IPFW; Summit League conference tournament quarterfinals	W 75–62	21–11	Sioux Falls Arena (2,411); Sioux Falls, SD
March 9, 2009; 9:30pm		vs. South Dakota State; Summit League conference tournament semifinals	W 74–56	22–11	Sioux Falls Arena (5,986); Sioux Falls, SD
March 10, 2009; 8:00pm, ESPN2		vs. North Dakota State; Summit League conference tournament finals	L 64-66	22–12	Sioux Falls Arena (3,804); Sioux Falls, SD
March 17, 2009*; 7:00pm		Kent State; CollegeInsider.com Tournament first round	W 80–74	23–12	Athletics Center O'rena (2,155); Rochester, MI
March 23, 2009*; 8:00pm		at Bradley; CollegeInsider.com Tournament quarterfinals	L 75-76	23–13	Carver Arena (5,007); Peoria, IL
*Non-conference game. ^{#}Rankings from AP Poll. (#) Tournament seedings in parentheses. All times are in Eastern Time.
