= 2009 Summit League men's basketball tournament =

- Classification: Division I
- Season: 2008–09
- Teams: 8
- Site: Sioux Falls Arena; Sioux Falls, South Dakota
- Champions: North Dakota State (1st title)
- Winning coach: Saul Phillips (1st title)
- MVP: Ben Woodside (North Dakota St)
- Top scorer: Ben Woodside (North Dakota St) (61 points)
- Television: ESPN2

2008–09 Summit League men's basketball standings
	Conf.				Overall
Team	W		L	PCT	W		L	PCT
North Dakota State †	16	–	2	.889	26	–	7	.788
Oral Roberts	14	–	4	.778	16	–	15	.516
Oakland	13	–	5	.722	23	–	13	.639
IUPUI	9	–	9	.500	16	–	14	.533
Southern Utah	8	–	10	.444	11	–	20	.355
IPFW	8	–	10	.444	13	–	17	.433
South Dakota State	7	–	11	.389	13	–	20	.394
Centenary	6	–	12	.333	8	–	23	.258
Western Illinois	6	–	12	.333	9	–	20	.310
UMKC	3	–	15	.167	7	–	24	.226
† Summit League Tournament winner Rankings from AP Poll

The 2009 Summit League men's basketball tournament was the 2009 post-season tournament for Summit League, an NCAA Division I athletic conference. It took place March 7–10, 2009 at Sioux Falls Arena in Sioux Falls, South Dakota.

Top-seeded North Dakota State defeated #3 seed Oakland 66–64 to earn an automatic berth into the 2009 NCAA Men's Division I Basketball Tournament. The winning points came on a shot by Ben Woodside, who was also named the tournament MVP, with 3.3 seconds left. North Dakota State trailed for most of the final; the Bison were behind by as much as 14 points in the first half and 12 with less than 10 minutes left, but they went on an 18–4 run to end the game, capped by Woodside's shot. A long three-pointer by Oakland's Johnathon Jones at the buzzer bounced off the rim, preserving the Bison victory.

The Bison, who were in their first season of eligibility for Division I postseason play, became the first men's team in Division I or its predecessors in more than 35 years to qualify for the NCAA Tournament in its first year of eligibility. The previous team to accomplish this feat was Southwestern Louisiana, now Louisiana-Lafayette, in 1972. The Bison were the second Summit League team that day to accomplish this feat—South Dakota State, also in its first year of Division I postseason eligibility, won the Summit women's tournament final, held at the same site, to book a place in the NCAA women's tournament. In another coincidence, the Jackrabbits defeated Oakland in their final.

== Format ==
Unlike most Division I basketball conferences, the Summit League does not send all of its teams into its conference tournament. Out of the league's 10 teams, the top eight receive berths in the conference tournament. After the 18-game conference season, teams are seeded by conference record, with tiebreakers used if necessary in the following order:

1. Head-to-head competition
2. Winning percentage vs. ranked conference teams (starting with #1 and moving down until the tie is broken)
3. Ratings Percentage Index
4. Coin flip

== Bracket ==
Quarterfinals; March 7–8
1	North Dakota State	83
8	Centenary	77
4	IUPUI	48
5	Southern Utah	53
2	Oral Roberts	69 ^{OT}
7	South Dakota State	72
3	Oakland	75
6	IPFW	62

Semifinals; March 9
1	North Dakota State	79
5	Southern Utah	67
7	South Dakota State	56
3	Oakland	74

Final; March 10
1	North Dakota State	66
3	Oakland	64
