= 2007–08 Oral Roberts Golden Eagles men's basketball team =

American college basketball season

2007–08 Oral Roberts Golden Eagles men's basketball

Summit League tournament champions Summit League Regular Season champions

NCAA tournament, First Round
- Conference: Summit League
- Record: 24–9 (16–2 Summit)
- Head coach: Scott Sutton (9th season)
- Assistant coaches: Tom Hankins; Conley Phipps
- Home arena: Mabee Center

2007–08 Summit League men's basketball standings
	Conf.				Overall
Team	W		L	PCT	W		L	PCT
Oral Roberts †	16	–	2	.889	24	–	9	.727
IUPUI	15	–	3	.833	26	–	7	.788
Oakland	11	–	7	.611	17	–	14	.548
North Dakota State	10	–	8	.556	16	–	13	.552
Southern Utah	9	–	9	.500	11	–	19	.367
IPFW	9	–	9	.500	13	–	18	.419
Western Illinois	7	–	11	.389	12	–	18	.400
UMKC	6	–	12	.333	11	–	21	.344
Centenary	4	–	14	.222	10	–	21	.323
South Dakota State	3	–	15	.167	8	–	21	.276
† 2008 Summit League Tournament winner Rankings from AP Poll

The 2007–08 Oral Roberts Golden Eagles men's basketball team represented Oral Roberts University during the 2007–08 NCAA Division I men's basketball season. The Golden Eagles, led by 9th year head coach Scott Sutton, played their home games at the Mabee Center and were members of The Summit League. They finished the season 24–9, 16–2 in Summit League play to be crowned regular season champions. They won the Summit League tournament to receive an automatic bid to the NCAA tournament as No. 13 seed in the South region. The Golden Eagles lost to No. 4 seed Pittsburgh in the opening round.

== Roster ==
2007–08 Oral Roberts Golden Eagles men's basketball team
Players
Coaches

Pos.	#	Name	Height	Weight	Year	Previous school	Hometown
G	10	Robert Jarvis	5 ft 11 in (1.8 m)	185 lb (84 kg)	Jr		Humble, Texas
G	11	Adam Liberty	6 ft 2 in (1.88 m)	180 lb (82 kg)	Sr		Oklahoma City, Oklahoma
F	13	Moses Ehambe	6 ft 5 in (1.96 m)	215 lb (98 kg)	Sr	Mansfield Summit	Arlington, Texas
F	21	Marcus Lewis	6 ft 8 in (2.03 m)	265 lb (120 kg)	Jr		Long Beach, California
C	33	Shawn King	6 ft 10 in (2.08 m)	225 lb (102 kg)	Sr	Carl Albert State	Gasparillo, Trinidad and Tobago
F	44	Marchello Vealy	6 ft 7 in (2.01 m)	215 lb (98 kg)	Jr		Oklahoma City, Oklahoma

Head coach

- Scott Sutton (Oklahoma State)

Assistant coach(es)

Legend

- (C) Team captain
- (S) Suspended
- (I) Ineligible
- (W) Walk-on
- Injured
- Current redshirt

Roster

== Schedule and results ==
Date time, TV	Rank^{#}	Opponent^{#}	Result	Record	Site (attendance) city, state
Exhibition
Regular season
Nov 9, 2007*		Southwestern Oklahoma State	W 84–59	1–0	Mabee Center (4,414); Tulsa, Oklahoma
Nov 13, 2007*; ESPNU		at Texas A&M; NIT Season Tip-Off	L 53–67	1–1	Reed Arena (8,442); College Station, Texas
Nov 14, 2007*		vs. Texas A&M–Corpus Christi	L 81–86 ^{OT}	1–2	Reed Arena (NA); College Station, Texas
Nov 20, 2007*		Louisiana-Lafayette	W 62–53	2–2	Mabee Center (4,613); Tulsa, Oklahoma
Nov 24, 2007*		at Lamar	W 65–57	3–2	Montagne Center (2,679); Beaumont, Texas
Nov 27, 2007*		Tulsa	W 84–70	4–2	Mabee Center (7,436); Tulsa, Oklahoma
Dec 1, 2007*		at Arkansas	L 51–62	4–3	Bud Walton Arena (15,335); Fayetteville, Arkansas
Dec 6, 2007		North Dakota State	W 69–57	5–3 (1–0)	Mabee Center (4,159); Tulsa, Oklahoma
Dec 8, 2007		South Dakota State	W 80–51	6–3 (2–0)	Mabee Center (4,502); Tulsa, Oklahoma
Dec 18, 2007*		at No. 4 Texas	L 56–66	6–4	Frank Erwin Center (11,540); Austin, Texas
Dec 20, 2007*		vs. Oklahoma State	W 74–59	7–4	Ford Center (NA); Oklahoma City, Oklahoma
Dec 29, 2007*		at Utah State	L 55–76	7–5	Dee Glen Smith Spectrum (7,959); Logan, Utah
Jan 5, 2008		at Centenary	W 71–62 ^{OT}	8–5 (3–0)	Gold Dome (541); Shreveport, Louisiana
Jan 10, 2008		at IPFW	W 68–56	9–5 (4–0)	Allen County War Memorial Coliseum (1,221); Fort Wayne, Indiana
Jan 12, 2008		at Oakland	W 66–60	10–5 (5–0)	Athletics Center O'rena (2,505); Rochester, Michigan
Jan 17, 2008		IUPUI	W 64–63	11–5 (6–0)	Mabee Center (6,977); Tulsa, Oklahoma
Jan 19, 2008		Western Illinois	W 76–55	12–5 (7–0)	Mabee Center (6,610); Tulsa, Oklahoma
Jan 24, 2008		at UMKC	W 75–47	13–5 (8–0)	Municipal Auditorium (1,503); Kansas City, Missouri
Jan 26, 2008		at Southern Utah	W 80–75	14–5 (9–0)	Centrum (3,816); Cedar City, Utah
Feb 2, 2008		Centenary	W 73–62	15–5 (10–0)	Mabee Center (7,213); Tulsa, Oklahoma
Feb 7, 2008		Oakland	W 60–53	16–5 (11–0)	Mabee Center (5,255); Tulsa, Oklahoma
Feb 9, 2008		IPFW	W 88–56	17–5 (12–0)	Mabee Center (8,139); Tulsa, Oklahoma
Feb 14, 2008		at Western Illinois	W 76–71	18–5 (13–0)	Western Hall (587); Macomb, Illinois
Feb 16, 2008		at IUPUI	L 66–69	18–6 (13–1)	The Jungle (1,215); Indianapolis, Indiana
Feb 19, 2008		Southern Utah	W 71–62	19–6 (14–1)	Mabee Center (4,212); Tulsa, Oklahoma
Feb 21, 2008		UMKC	W 72–64	20–6 (15–1)	Mabee Center (4,108); Tulsa, Oklahoma
Feb 23, 2008*; ESPN2		Creighton; O'Reilly ESPNU BracketBusters	L 64–65	20–7	Mabee Center (8,152); Tulsa, Oklahoma
Feb 28, 2008		at South Dakota State	W 67–52	21–7 (16–1)	Frost Arena (1,708); Brookings, South Dakota
Mar 1, 2008		at North Dakota State	L 55–68	21–8 (16–2)	Bison Sports Arena (4,833); Fargo, North Dakota
Summit League tournament
Mar 8, 2008*		vs. Centenary; Quarterfinals	W 84–56	22–8	Union Multipurpose Activity Center (NA); Tulsa, Oklahoma
Mar 10, 2008*		vs. Purdue-Fort Wayne; Semifinals	W 58–42	23–8	Union Multipurpose Activity Center (NA); Tulsa, Oklahoma
Mar 11, 2008*		vs. IUPUI; Championship Game	W 71–64	24–8	Union Multipurpose Activity Center (4,217); Tulsa, Oklahoma
NCAA tournament
Mar 20, 2008*	(13 S)	vs. (4 S) No. 17 Pittsburgh; First Round	L 63–82	24–9	The Pepsi Center (19,010); Denver, Colorado
*Non-conference game. ^{#}Rankings from AP poll. (#) Tournament seedings in parentheses. S=South. All times are in Central Time.
