= 2008–09 IUPUI Jaguars men's basketball team =

American college basketball season

2008–09 IUPUI Jaguars men's basketball
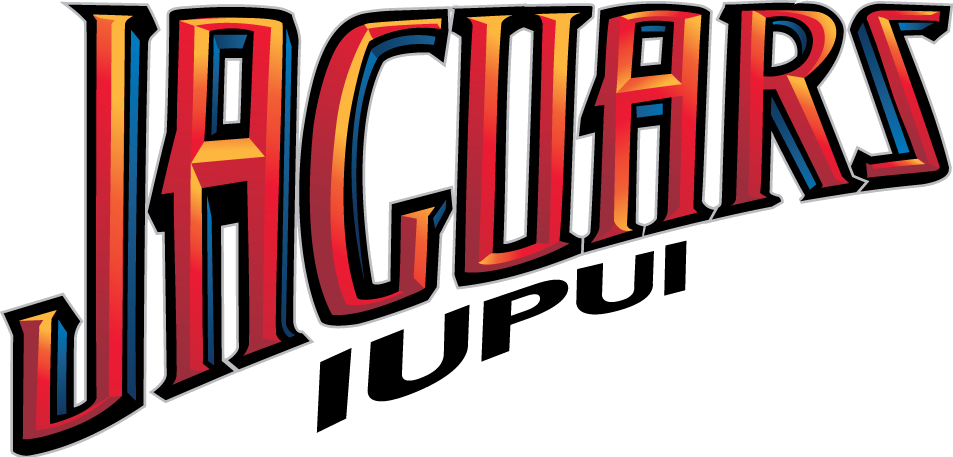
- Conference: The Summit League
- Record: 16–14 (9–9 Summit)
- Head coach: Ron Hunter
- Assistant coaches: Todd Howard; Matt Crenshaw; Austin Parkinson
- Home arena: The Jungle

2008–09 Summit League men's basketball standings
	Conf.				Overall
Team	W		L	PCT	W		L	PCT
North Dakota State †	16	–	2	.889	26	–	7	.788
Oral Roberts	14	–	4	.778	16	–	15	.516
Oakland	13	–	5	.722	23	–	13	.639
IUPUI	9	–	9	.500	16	–	14	.533
Southern Utah	8	–	10	.444	11	–	20	.355
IPFW	8	–	10	.444	13	–	17	.433
South Dakota State	7	–	11	.389	13	–	20	.394
Centenary	6	–	12	.333	8	–	23	.258
Western Illinois	6	–	12	.333	9	–	20	.310
UMKC	3	–	15	.167	7	–	24	.226
† Summit League Tournament winner Rankings from AP Poll

The 2008–09 IUPUI Jaguars men's basketball team is a National Collegiate Athletic Association Division I college basketball team representing Indiana University-Purdue University Indianapolis.

IUPUI was picked to finish fourth in The Summit League's preseason poll. Oral Roberts was voted to finish first and North Dakota State second. Senior guard Gary Patterson was named to the Preseason All-League Second Team.

== Roster ==
Name	Number	Position	Height	Weight	Year	Hometown
John Ashworth	42	G	6-3	195	Sophomore	Indianapolis, Indiana
Jon Avery	20	F	6-7	205	Junior	Mansfield, Ohio
Robert Glenn	23	F	6-7	195	Junior	Indianapolis, Indiana
Aaron Morris	31	F	6-6	215	Freshman	Richmond, Kentucky
Adrian Moss	11	G	5-9	155	Sophomore	Franklin, Indiana
Leroy Nobles	1	F	6-5	185	Sophomore	Louisville, Kentucky
Gary Patterson	24	G	5-10	175	Senior	East Chicago, Indiana
Billy Pettiford	54	F	6-7	220	Junior	Marion, Indiana
Christian Siakam	55	F	6-7	230	Freshman	Cincinnati, Ohio
Jason Smeathers	30	F	6-8	200	Freshman	Greenwood, Indiana
Larry Stone	22	G	5-9	170	Freshman	Indianapolis, Indiana
Anthony Williams	32	C	6-8	240	Sophomore	Winter Haven, Florida
Alex Young	5	F	6-5	195	Freshman	Indianapolis, Indiana

Coaches: Ron Hunter, Todd Howard, Matt Crenshaw, Austin Parkinson

== Schedule ==
Date time, TV	Rank^{#}	Opponent^{#}	Result	Record	Site city, state
11/11/08*; 4:00pm		vs. Northeastern; 2K Sports Classic benefiting Coaches vs. Cancer	L 60-73	0-1	Crisler Arena (6,328); Ann Arbor, MI
11/12/08*; 5:00pm		vs. Michigan Tech; 2K Sports Classic benefiting Coaches vs. Cancer	W 65-51	1-0	Crisler Arena (6,246); Ann Arbor, MI
11/18/08*; 6:30pm, BTN		at Indiana	L 57-60	1-2	Assembly Hall (13,174); Bloomington, IN
11/22/08*; 7:00pm		IU East	W 92-55	2-2	The Jungle (1,020); Indianapolis, IN
11/25/08*; 7:30pm		vs. Eastern Illinois	W 67-60	3-2	Conseco Fieldhouse (2,447); Indianapolis, IN
11/29/08*; 2:00pm		at Western Michigan	W 78-68	4-2	University Arena (2,574); Kalamazoo, MI
12/2/08*; 7:00 pm		IU South Bend	W 84-59	5-2	The Jungle (988); Indianapolis, IN
12/6/08; 7:00pm		Western Illinois	L 48-58	5-3 (0-1)	The Jungle (1,012); Indianapolis, IN
12/14/08*; 3:15pm		vs. Arizona State	L 58-59 ^{OT}	5-4 (0-1)	US Airways Center (6,207); Phoenix, AZ
12/20/08*; 7:00pm		at Seton Hall	W 67-65	6-4 (0-1)	Prudential Center (7,298); Newark, NJ
12/23/08*; 1:00pm		vs. Indiana State	W 62-41	7-4 (0-1)	Conseco Fieldhouse (3,327); Indianapolis, IN
12/27/08*; 4:00pm		at Massachusetts	L 57-64	7-5 (0-1)	Mullins Center (4,876); Amherst, MA
12/31/08; 1:00pm		UMKC	W 72–69	8–5 (1–1)	The Jungle (968); Indianapolis, IN
1/02/09; 7:00pm		Southern Utah	W 59–54	9–5 (2–1)	The Jungle (1,010); Indianapolis, IN
1/08/09; 8:00pm		at North Dakota State	L 52–55	9–6 (2–2)	Bison Sports Arena (2,524); Fargo, ND
1/10/09; 8:30pm		at South Dakota State	L 63–83	9–7 (2–3)	Frost Arena (3,503); Brookings, SD
1/15/09; 7:00pm		Oral Roberts	L 58–67	9–8 (2–4)	The Jungle (1,068); Indianapolis, IN
1/17/09; 7:00pm		Centenary	L 66–68	9–9 (2–5)	The Jungle (1,215); Indianapolis, IN
1/22/09; 7:00pm, FSN Detroit		Oakland	L 57–75	9–10 (2–6)	Athletics Center O'rena (2,805); Rochester, MI
1/24/09; 4:00pm		at IPFW	W 84–57	10–10 (3–6)	Allen County War Memorial Coliseum (1,175); Fort Wayne, IN
1/29/09; 9:00pm		Southern Utah	W 79–65	11–10 (4–6)	Centrum Arena (2,203); Cedar City, UT
1/31/09; 8:05pm		UMKC	W 60–56	12–10 (5–6)	Municipal Auditorium (3,145); Kansas City, MO
2/5/08; 7:00pm		South Dakota State	W 71–63	13–10 (6–6)	The Jungle (1,037); Indianapolis, IN
2/7/09; 7:00pm		North Dakota State	L 69–91	13–11 (6–7)	The Jungle (1,215); Indianapolis, IN
2/12/09; 8:00pm		at Centenary	W 79–67	14–11 (7–7)	Gold Dome (859); Shreveport, LA
2/14/09; 8:05pm		at Oral Roberts	L 60–71	14–12 (7–8)	Mabee Center (7,849); Tulsa, OK
2/19/09; 7:00pm		IPFW	W 57–55	15–12 (8–8)	The Jungle (1,130); Indianapolis, IN
2/21/09; 7:00pm		Oakland	L 76–81	15–13 (8–9)	IUPUI Gymnasium (1,215); Indianapolis, IN
2/28/09; 8:00pm		at Western Illinois	W 71–66	16–13 (9–9)	Western Hall (1,187); Macomb, IL
2/28/09; 8:00pm		at Southern Utah	L 48–53	16–14	Sioux Falls Arena (2,411); Sioux Falls, SD
*Non-conference game. ^{#}Rankings from AP Poll. (#) Tournament seedings in parentheses. All times are in Eastern Time.
