= Matt Brown (basketball) =

American basketball player and coach

Biographical details
- Born: December 15, 1969 (age 56)

Playing career
- 1988–1990: Northern Kentucky
- 1991–1993: Shippensburg

Coaching career (HC unless noted)
- 1993–1994: Shippensburg (asst.)
- 1994–1996: Marshall (admin. asst.)
- 1996–1997: Florida (admin. asst.)
- 1997–2002: Richmond (asst.)
- 2002–2007: West Virginia (asst.)
- 2007–2013: UMKC
- 2015–2016: Northland Christian School
- 2016–2017: Wentworth
- 2017–2024: State Fair CC

Matthew Scott Brown (born December 15, 1969) is an American college basketball coach and the current head men's basketball coach at the State Fair Community College. He was the former head coach at the University of Missouri-Kansas City from 2007 to 2013. Before becoming the head coach at UMKC, Brown was a member of John Beilein's staff for 10 years, five years at Richmond and five years at West Virginia. He was fired as head coach of UMKC on March 12, 2013, after posting a 64–122 record in six seasons.

From August 2015 to March 2016, Brown served as the Northland Christian School coach. He was the head coach of Wentworth Military Academy from 2016 to 2017 while also serving as an adjunct professor of lifetime fitness. Brown was hired as the head coach of State Fair Community College in April 2017.

== Head coaching record ==
Record table
Season	Team	Overall	Conference	Standing	Postseason
UMKC Kangaroos (Summit League) (2007–2013)
2007–08	UMKC	11–21	6–12	8th	
2008–09	UMKC	7–24	3–15	10th	
2009–10	UMKC	12–18	6–12	T–7th	
2010–11	UMKC	16–14	9–9	6th	
2011–12	UMKC	10–21	4–14	10th	
2012–13	UMKC	8–24	5–11	7th	
UMKC:		64–122 (.344)	33–73 (.311)		
Total:		64–122 (.344)			
National champion Postseason invitational champion Conference regular season champion Conference regular season and conference tournament champion Division regular season champion Division regular season and conference tournament champion Conference tournament champion
