= 2007–08 Oakland Golden Grizzlies men's basketball team =

American college basketball season

2007–08 Oakland Golden Grizzlies men's basketball
- Conference: The Summit League
- Record: 17–14 (11–7 The Summit League)
- Head coach: Greg Kampe
- Assistant coaches: Jeff Tungate; Darren Sorenson; Saddi Washington
- Home arena: Athletics Center O'rena

2007–08 Summit League men's basketball standings
	Conf.				Overall
Team	W		L	PCT	W		L	PCT
Oral Roberts †	16	–	2	.889	24	–	9	.727
IUPUI	15	–	3	.833	26	–	7	.788
Oakland	11	–	7	.611	17	–	14	.548
North Dakota State	10	–	8	.556	16	–	13	.552
Southern Utah	9	–	9	.500	11	–	19	.367
IPFW	9	–	9	.500	13	–	18	.419
Western Illinois	7	–	11	.389	12	–	18	.400
UMKC	6	–	12	.333	11	–	21	.344
Centenary	4	–	14	.222	10	–	21	.323
South Dakota State	3	–	15	.167	8	–	21	.276
† 2008 Summit League Tournament winner Rankings from AP Poll

The 2007–08 Oakland Golden Grizzlies men's basketball team represented Oakland University in the 2007–08 college basketball season. Oakland was coached by Greg Kampe and played their home games at the Athletics Center O'rena. The Golden Grizzlies finished the season 17–14 overall and 11–7 in The Summit League. Oakland advanced to the semi-finals of The Summit League tournament before falling to Indiana–Purdue Indianapolis 80–65.

== Season ==
During the season, Oakland defeated #21 Oregon of the Pacific-10 Conference at The Palace of Auburn Hills, Mid-American Conference teams Eastern Michigan and Bowling Green at home and nearly defeated Big Ten Conference member Michigan State on the road, falling 75–71.

At the conclusion of the season, Derick Nelson was named to the all-Summit League First Team while Johnathon Jones was named to the Second Team.

== Roster ==
No.	Name	Pos.	Height	Weight	Year	Hometown (Previous school)
1	Derick Nelson	F	6'5"	226	Jr.	Lansing, MI (Bridgton Academy)
2	Peter Bunn	G	6'1"	165	Fr.	Lansing, MI (Lansing Christian)
4	Will Hudson	F	6'9"	220	Fr.	Verona, WI (Middleton)
11	B-Jay Walker	G	5'8"	149	So.	Lathrup Village, MI (Shrine Catholic)
12	Brandon Cassise	G	6'3"	207	Sr.	Walled Lake, MI (St. Mary's Preparatory)
20	Shane Lawal	C	6'10"	225	Jr.	Southfield, MI (Lathrup)
21	Ricky Bieszki	G	6'2"	186	Jr.	Shelby Township, MI (Notre Dame Preparatory)
22	Ray Goodson	G	6'1"	195	Fr.	Detroit, MI (Pershing)
23	Johnathon Jones	G	5'11"	160	So.	Okemos, MI (Okemos)
30	Erik Kangas	G	6'3"	210	Jr.	DeWitt, MI (DeWitt)
32	John Kast	G	6'2"	190	Fr.-R	Clarkston, MI (Clarkston)
33	Tim Williams	G	6'2"	200	Fr.	Pontiac, MI (Pontiac Northern)
34	Keith Benson	C	6'11"	210	Fr.-R	Farmington Hills, MI (Country Day)
44	Patrick McCloskey	F	6'8"	229	Sr.	Marshall, MI (Marshall)
45	Dan Waterstradt	C	6'10"	240	Jr.	Dearborn Heights, MI (Rutgers)

== Schedule ==
Date time, TV	Rank^{#}	Opponent^{#}	Result	Record	Site (attendance) city, state
November 5, 2007*; 7:30pm		Windsor; Exhibition	W 115–94	0–0	Athletics Center O'rena (N/A); Rochester, MI
November 9, 2007*; 8:05pm		at Wisconsin–Green Bay	L 75-76	0–1	Resch Center (3,117); Green Bay, WI
November 11, 2007*; 1:00pm		Adrian	W 86–46	1–1	Athletics Center O'rena (1,135); Rochester, MI
November 17, 2007*; 6:00pm		Eastern Michigan	W 86–71	2–1	Athletics Center O'rena (1,825); Rochester, MI
November 20, 2007*; 7:00pm		Duquesne	L 77-92	2–2	Athletics Center O'rena (1,545); Rochester, MI
November 24, 2007*; 4:00pm, Big Ten Network		at No. 11 Michigan State	L 71-75	2–3	Breslin Student Events Center (14,759); East Lansing, MI
November 28, 2007*; 7:00pm, FSN Ohio		at No. 25 Xavier	L 68-93	2–4	Cintas Center (9,525); Cincinnati, OH
December 1, 2007*; 4:00pm, FSN Detroit		Bowling Green	W 90–80	3–4	Athletics Center O'rena (2,335); Rochester, MI
December 6, 2007; 7:00pm		Missouri–Kansas City	W 114–105 ^{OT}	4–4 (1–0)	Athletics Center O'rena (1,165); Rochester, MI
December 8, 2007; 6:00pm		Southern Utah	L 73-82	4–5 (1–1)	Athletics Center O'rena (1,705); Rochester, MI
December 12, 2007*; 7:00pm, Big Ten Network		at Michigan	L 87-103	4–6	Crisler Arena (8,435); Ann Arbor, MI
December 19, 2007*; 7:00pm		Rochester	W 67–53	5–6	Athletics Center O'rena (1,195); Rochester, MI
December 22, 2007*; 9:00pm, ESPNU		vs. No. 21 Oregon	W 68–62	6–6	The Palace of Auburn Hills (22,076); Auburn Hills, MI
December 29, 2007*; 7:00pm		at Toledo	L 69-71	6–7	Savage Hall (3,491); Toledo, OH
January 3, 2008; 8:00pm		at South Dakota State	W 73–72	7–7 (2–1)	Frost Arena (1,337); Brookings, SD
January 5, 2008; 8:00pm		at North Dakota State	W 73–71	8–7 (3–1)	Bison Sports Arena (3,593); Fargo, ND
January 10, 2008; 7:00pm		Centenary	W 74–61	9–7 (4–1)	Athletics Center O'rena (1,795); Rochester, MI
January 12, 2008; 12:00pm, FSN Detroit		Oral Roberts	L 60-66	9–8 (4–2)	Athletics Center O'rena (2,505); Rochester, MI
January 19, 2008; 4:00pm, WISE-TV		at Indiana–Purdue Fort Wayne	L 69-77	9–9 (4–3)	Allen County War Memorial Coliseum (2,240); Fort Wayne, IN
January 24, 2008; 7:00pm		at Indiana–Purdue Indianapolis	L 69-82	9–10 (4–4)	IUPUI Gymnasium (1,059); Indianapolis, IN
January 26, 2008; 8:00pm, WWIR-TV		at Western Illinois	W 85–71	10–10 (5–4)	Western Hall (962); Macomb, IL
January 31, 2008; 7:00pm, FSN Detroit		North Dakota State	W 77–74	11–10 (6–4)	Athletics Center O'rena (2,125); Rochester, MI
February 2, 2008; 6:00pm		South Dakota State	W 78–68	12–10 (7–4)	Athletics Center O'rena (2,285); Rochester, MI
February 7, 2008; 8:05pm		at Oral Roberts	L 53-60	12–11 (7–5)	Mabee Center (5,255); Tulsa, OK
February 9, 2008; 6:30pm		at Centenary	W 97–61	13–11 (8–5)	Gold Dome (508); Shreveport, LA
February 16, 2008; 6:00pm		Indiana–Purdue Fort Wayne	L 66-71	13–12 (8–6)	Athletics Center O'rena (3,125); Rochester, MI
February 21, 2008; 7:30pm, FSN Detroit		Indiana–Purdue Indianapolis	W 84–69	14–12 (9–6)	Athletics Center O'rena (2,555); Rochester, MI
February 23, 2008; 6:00pm		Western Illinois	W 91–82	15–12 (10–6)	Athletics Center O'rena (3,855); Rochester, MI
February 28, 2008; 9:00pm		at Southern Utah	L 59-68	15–13 (10–7)	Centrum Arena (2,022); Cedar City, UT
March 1, 2008; 8:05pm, Metro Sports		at Missouri–Kansas City	W 85–75	16–13 (11–7)	Municipal Auditorium (3,086); Kansas City, MO
March 9, 2008*; 8:30pm		vs. Western Illinois; The Summit League Tournament first round	W 80–66	17–13	Union Multipurpose Activity Center (1,367); Tulsa, OK
March 10, 2008*; 8:30pm, ESPN Full Court		vs. Indiana–Purdue Indianapolis; The Summit League Tournament semi-finals	L 65-80	17–14	Union Multipurpose Activity Center (3,307); Tulsa, OK
*Non-conference game. ^{#}Rankings from AP Poll. (#) Tournament seedings in parentheses. All times are in Eastern Time.
