= 2002–03 IUPUI Jaguars men's basketball team =

American college basketball season

2002–2003 IUPUI Jaguars men's basketball
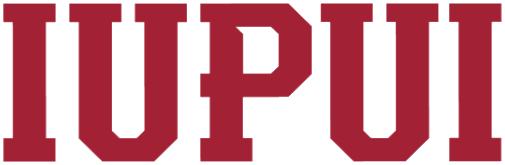

Mid-Con tournament champions

NCAA tournament
- Conference: Mid-Continent Conference
- Record: 20–14 (10–4 Mid-Con)
- Head coach: Ron Hunter (9th season)
- Assistant coach: Joseph Price (1st season)
- Home arena: Indiana Farmers Coliseum; IUPUI Gymnasium

2002–03 Mid-Continent Conference men's basketball standings
	Conf.				Overall
Team	W		L	PCT	W		L	PCT
Valparaiso	12	–	2	.857	20	–	11	.645
IUPUI †	10	–	4	.714	20	–	14	.588
Oakland	10	–	4	.714	17	–	11	.607
Oral Roberts	9	–	5	.643	18	–	10	.643
UMKC	7	–	7	.500	9	–	20	.310
Southern Utah	5	–	9	.357	11	–	17	.393
Western Illinois	3	–	11	.214	7	–	21	.250
Chicago State	0	–	14	.000	3	–	27	.100
† 2003 Mid-Con Tournament winner Rankings from AP Poll

The 2002–03 IUPUI Jaguars men's basketball team represented Indiana University–Purdue University Indianapolis during the 2002–03 NCAA Division I men's basketball season. The Jaguars, led by 9th-year head coach Ron Hunter, played their home games at Indiana Farmers Coliseum in Indianapolis, Indiana as members of the Mid-Continent Conference. They finished the season 20–14, 10–4 in conference play to finish in a tie for second place. The Jaguars then won the Mid-Con tournament to receive an automatic bid to the NCAA tournament – the first appearance in school history. Playing as the No. 16 seed in the Midwest region, they lost to No. 1 seed Kentucky in the opening round.

== Roster ==
2002–03 IUPUI Jaguars men's basketball team
Players
Coaches

Pos.	#	Name	Height	Weight	Year	Previous school	Hometown
F	4	D.A. Harvey	6 ft 6 in (1.98 m)	225 lb (102 kg)	Sr	Perry	Perry, Georgia
G	5	Anze Sagadin	6 ft 5 in (1.96 m)	195 lb (88 kg)	Fr	Gimnazija-Bizigrad	Ljublijana, Slovenia
G	11	Ryan Osborn	6 ft 0 in (1.83 m)	175 lb (79 kg)	Jr	Logansport	Logansport, Indiana
G	20	Marcus May	5 ft 11 in (1.8 m)	175 lb (79 kg)	Sr	North Central	Indianapolis, Indiana
G	21	Matt Crenshaw	6 ft 3 in (1.91 m)	200 lb (91 kg)	Jr	Western Albemarle	Charlottesville, Virginia
G	22	Blair Crawford	6 ft 3 in (1.91 m)	200 lb (91 kg)	So	Kokomo	Kokomo, Indiana
F	24	Josh Mullins	6 ft 5 in (1.96 m)	225 lb (102 kg)	Sr	Greenfield-Central	Greenfield, Indiana
F	25	Josh Murray	6 ft 7 in (2.01 m)	215 lb (98 kg)	Sr	North Central	Indianapolis, Indiana
G	30	Brandon Cole	6 ft 6 in (1.98 m)	210 lb (95 kg)	Fr	Ben Davis	Indianapolis, Indiana
G	32	Bryan Buchanan	6 ft 1 in (1.85 m)	180 lb (82 kg)	Sr	Lincoln	Lincoln, Nebraska
F	33	Chris Sanders	6 ft 5 in (1.96 m)	225 lb (102 kg)	Sr	North Knox	Bicknell, Indiana
F	40	Odell Bradley	6 ft 4 in (1.93 m)	240 lb (109 kg)	Jr	Whites Creek	Nashville, Tennessee
F	41	Antoine Lewis	6 ft 6 in (1.98 m)	240 lb (109 kg)	Sr	Hammond	Hammond, Indiana
F	42	Fred Long	6 ft 8 in (2.03 m)	240 lb (109 kg)	Jr	Lawrence North	Indianapolis, Indiana
F	54	Nick Rollins	6 ft 8 in (2.03 m)	225 lb (102 kg)	Fr	Dr. Phillips	Orlando, Florida
C	55	Herbert Lambert	6 ft 10 in (2.08 m)	235 lb (107 kg)	Sr	Providence St. Mel	Chicago, Illinois

Head coach

- Ron Hunter (IUPUI)

Assistant coach(es)

- Joseph Price (Notre Dame)

Legend

- (C) Team captain
- (S) Suspended
- (I) Ineligible
- (W) Walk-on
- Injured
- Current redshirt

Roster

== Schedule and results ==
Date time, TV	Rank^{#}	Opponent^{#}	Result	Record	Site (attendance) city, state
Regular season
Nov 17, 2002*; 1:30 p.m.		vs. Brown; Guardians Classic	W 66–65	1–0	Joyce Center (10,689); Notre Dame, Indiana
Nov 18, 2002*; 7:00 p.m.		at Notre Dame; Guardians Classic	L 45–89	1–1	Joyce Center (10,255); Notre Dame, Indiana
Nov 23, 2002*; 7:00 p.m.		Saint Joseph's (IN)	W 79–58	2–1	IUPUI Gymnasium (1,326); Indianapolis, Indiana
Nov 25, 2002*; 7:00 p.m.		vs. Creighton; Guardians Classic	L 52–99	2–2	Municipal Auditorium (1,879); Kansas City, Missouri
Nov 26, 2002*; 6:00 p.m.		vs. Furman; Guardians Classic	L 62–70	2–3	Municipal Auditorium (1,750); Kansas City, Missouri
Nov 27, 2002*; 7:00 p.m.		at Northwestern	W 56–53	3–3	Welsh-Ryan Arena (3,143); Evanston, Illinois
Dec 3, 2002*; 7:00 p.m.		at Ball State	L 69–85	3–4	Worthen Arena (4,688); Muncie, Indiana
Dec 6, 2002*; 5:30 p.m.		vs. San Diego; Boilermaker Invitational	L 74–81	3–5	Mackey Arena (10,088); West Lafayette, Indiana
Dec 7, 2002*; 5:30 p.m.		vs. Middle Tennessee; Boilermaker Invitational	L 60–64	3–6	Mackey Arena (10,109); West Lafayette, Indiana
Dec 18, 2002*; 7:00 p.m.		at Cleveland State	W 90–74	4–6	CSU Convocation Center (1,112); Cleveland, Ohio
Dec 21, 2002*; 7:00 p.m.		Bradley	W 75–74	5–6	IUPUI Gymnasium (1,423); Indianapolis, Indiana
Dec 28, 2002*; 7:00 p.m.		at Morehead State	W 98–89 ^{OT}	6–6	Ellis Johnson Arena (3,218); Morehead, Kentucky
Dec 30, 2002*; 7:00 p.m.		Western Michigan	L 51–75	6–7	IUPUI Gymnasium (1,529); Indianapolis, Indiana
Jan 4, 2003*; 2:00 p.m.		at Michigan	L 79–84	6–8	Crisler Arena (9,108); Ann Arbor, Michigan
Jan 7, 2003*; 7:05 p.m.		at IPFW	L 80–86 ^{OT}	6–9	Allen County War Memorial Coliseum (491); Fort Wayne, Indiana
Jan 11, 2003; 7:00 p.m.		at Oakland	W 96–82	7–9 (1–0)	IUPUI Gymnasium (1,429); Indianapolis, Indiana
Jan 16, 2003; 7:05 p.m.		at Oral Roberts	L 63–66	7–10 (1–1)	Mabee Center (4,287); Tulsa, Oklahoma
Jan 18, 2003; 8:00 p.m.		at UMKC	W 74–65	8–10 (2–1)	Hale Arena (2,121); Kansas City, Missouri
Jan 23, 2003; 7:00 p.m.		Valparaiso	L 62–72	8–11 (2–2)	IUPUI Gymnasium (1,800); Indianapolis, Indiana
Jan 25, 2003; 7:00 p.m.		Western Illinois	W 76–62	9–11 (3–2)	IUPUI Gymnasium (1,369); Indianapolis, Indiana
Jan 30, 2003; 7:05 p.m.		at Southern Utah	W 56–53	10–11 (4–2)	Centrum Arena (1,836); Cedar City, Utah
Feb 1, 2003; 4:00 p.m.		at Chicago State	W 89–69	11–11 (5–2)	Dickens Athletic Center (421); Chicago, Illinois
Feb 4, 2003*; 7:00 p.m.		Lipscomb	W 77–61	12–11	IUPUI Gymnasium (1,024); Indianapolis, Indiana
Feb 8, 2003; 6:00 p.m.		at Oakland	L 78–79	12–12 (5–3)	Athletics Center O'rena (1,875); Auburn Hills, Michigan
Feb 13, 2003; 7:00 p.m.		UMKC	W 73–61	13–12 (6–3)	IUPUI Gymnasium (1,127); Indianapolis, Indiana
Feb 15, 2003; 7:15 p.m.		Oral Roberts	W 76–65	14–12 (7–3)	IUPUI Gymnasium (1,094); Indianapolis, Indiana
Feb 20, 2003; 7:00 p.m.		at Western Illinois	W 75–59	15–12 (8–3)	Western Hall (942); Macomb, Illinois
Feb 22, 2003; 11:07 a.m.		at Valparaiso	L 71–77	15–13 (8–4)	Athletics–Recreation Center (4,912); Valparaiso, Indiana
Feb 27, 2003; 7:00 p.m.		Southern Utah	W 77–58	16–13 (9–4)	IUPUI Gymnasium (1,503); Indianapolis, Indiana
Mar 1, 2003; 7:00 p.m.		Chicago State	W 67–55	17–13 (10–4)	IUPUI Gymnasium (1,602); Indianapolis, Indiana
Mid-Con tournament
Mar 9, 2003*; 6:00 p.m.	(2)	vs. (7) Western Illinois; Quarterfinals	W 75–51	18–13	Kemper Arena (1,794); Kansas City, Missouri
Mar 10, 2003*; 8:30 p.m.	(2)	vs. (6) Southern Utah; Semifinals	W 72–67	19–13	Kemper Arena (5,341); Kansas City, Missouri
Mar 11, 2003*; 8:00 p.m.	(2)	vs. (1) Valparaiso; Championship game	W 66–64	20–13	Kemper Arena (2,713); Kansas City, Missouri
NCAA tournament
Mar 21, 2003*; 11:30 a.m., CBS	(16 MW)	vs. (1 MW) No. 1 Kentucky; First round	L 64–95	20–14	Gaylord Entertainment Center (17,484); Nashville, Tennessee
*Non-conference game. ^{#}Rankings from AP Poll. (#) Tournament seedings in parentheses. All times are in Eastern.
