= 2008 Summit League men's basketball tournament =

- Classification: Division I
- Season: 2007–08
- Teams: 8
- Site: Union Multipurpose Activity Center; Tulsa, Oklahoma
- Champions: Oral Roberts (3rd title)
- Winning coach: Scott Sutton (3rd title)
- MVP: Moses Ehambe (Oral Roberts)
- Top scorer: George Hill (IUPUI) (72 points)

2007–08 Summit League men's basketball standings
	Conf.				Overall
Team	W		L	PCT	W		L	PCT
Oral Roberts †	16	–	2	.889	24	–	9	.727
IUPUI	15	–	3	.833	26	–	7	.788
Oakland	11	–	7	.611	17	–	14	.548
North Dakota State	10	–	8	.556	16	–	13	.552
Southern Utah	9	–	9	.500	11	–	19	.367
IPFW	9	–	9	.500	13	–	18	.419
Western Illinois	7	–	11	.389	12	–	18	.400
UMKC	6	–	12	.333	11	–	21	.344
Centenary	4	–	14	.222	10	–	21	.323
South Dakota State	3	–	15	.167	8	–	21	.276
† 2008 Summit League Tournament winner Rankings from AP Poll

The 2008 Summit League men's basketball tournament was won by Oral Roberts. It took place March 8–11, 2008 at the John Q. Hammons Arena in Tulsa, Oklahoma.

== All-tournament team ==
- Jaraun Burrows, IPFW
- Moses Ehambe, Oral Roberts (Most Valuable Player)
- George Hill, IUPUI
- Robert Jarvis, Oral Roberts
- Derick Nelson, Oakland

== Format ==
The top eight eligible men's basketball teams in the Summit League receive a berth in the conference tournament. After the 18 game conference season, teams are seeded by conference record with the following tie-breakers:

- Head-to-head competition
- Winning percentage vs. ranked conference teams (starting with #1 and moving down until the tie is broken)
- Ratings Percentage Index
- Coin flip

=== 2008 seeds ===
Seed	Team	Conference				Overall		
Seed	Team	W	L	Pct.	GB	W	L	Pct.
1	x-Oral Roberts	16	2	.889	–	24	8	.750
2	IUPUI	15	3	.833	1	26	7	.788
3	Oakland	11	7	.611	5	17	14	.548
–	North Dakota State	10	8	.556	6	16	13	.552
4	Southern Utah	9	9	.500	7	11	19	.367
5	IPFW	9	9	.500	7	14	17	.452
6	Western Illinois	7	11	.389	9	12	18	.400
7	UMKC	6	12	.333	10	11	21	.343
8	Centenary	4	14	.222	12	10	21	.323
–	South Dakota State	3	15	.167	13	8	21	.276

x-Clinched regular season championship

NOTE: North Dakota State and South Dakota State are ineligible for the 2008 Tournament.

=== 4th Place Tiebreaker ===
IPFW and Southern Utah split their two games and had identical records against each conference team. Southern Utah received the 4th seed, because their RPI of 231 was better than IPFW's RPI of 235.

== Bracket ==
Quarterfinals; March 8–9
1	Oral Roberts	84
8	Centenary	56
4	Southern Utah	62
5	IPFW	66
2	IUPUI	69
7	UMKC	65
3	Oakland	80
6	Western Illinois	66

Semifinals; March 10
1	Oral Roberts	58
5	IPFW	42
2	IUPUI	80
3	Oakland	65

Final; March 11
1	Oral Roberts	71
2	IUPUI	64
