= 2003 Mid-Continent Conference men's basketball tournament =

- Classification: Division I
- Season: 2002–03
- Teams: 8
- Site: Kemper Arena; Kansas City, Missouri
- Champions: IUPUI (1st title)
- Winning coach: Ron Hunter (1st title)
- MVP: Josh Murray (IUPUI)
- Mid-Continent Conference men's basketball tournaments

2002–03 Mid-Continent Conference men's basketball standings
	Conf.				Overall
Team	W		L	PCT	W		L	PCT
Valparaiso	12	–	2	.857	20	–	11	.645
IUPUI †	10	–	4	.714	20	–	14	.588
Oakland	10	–	4	.714	17	–	11	.607
Oral Roberts	9	–	5	.643	18	–	10	.643
UMKC	7	–	7	.500	9	–	20	.310
Southern Utah	5	–	9	.357	11	–	17	.393
Western Illinois	3	–	11	.214	7	–	21	.250
Chicago State	0	–	14	.000	3	–	27	.100
† 2003 Mid-Con Tournament winner Rankings from AP Poll

The 2003 Mid-Continent Conference men's basketball tournament was held March 9–11, 2003, at Kemper Arena in Kansas City, Missouri.

IUPUI defeated Valparaiso in the title game, 66–64, to win their first Mid-Con/Summit League championship. The Jaguars earned an automatic bid to the 2003 NCAA tournament as the #16 seed in the Midwest region.

== Format ==
All eight conference members qualified for the tournament. First round seedings were based on regular season record.

== Bracket ==
Quarterfinals; March 9
1	Valparaiso	82
8	Chicago State	62
4	Oral Roberts	73
5	UMKC	76
2	IUPUI	75
7	Western Illinois	51
3	Oakland	55
6	Southern Utah	66

Semifinals; March 10
1	Valparaiso	71
5	UMKC	50
2	IUPUI	72
6	Southern Utah	67

Final; March 11
1	Valparaiso	64
2	IUPUI	66
