= Ron Hunter =

American basketball coach (born 1964)

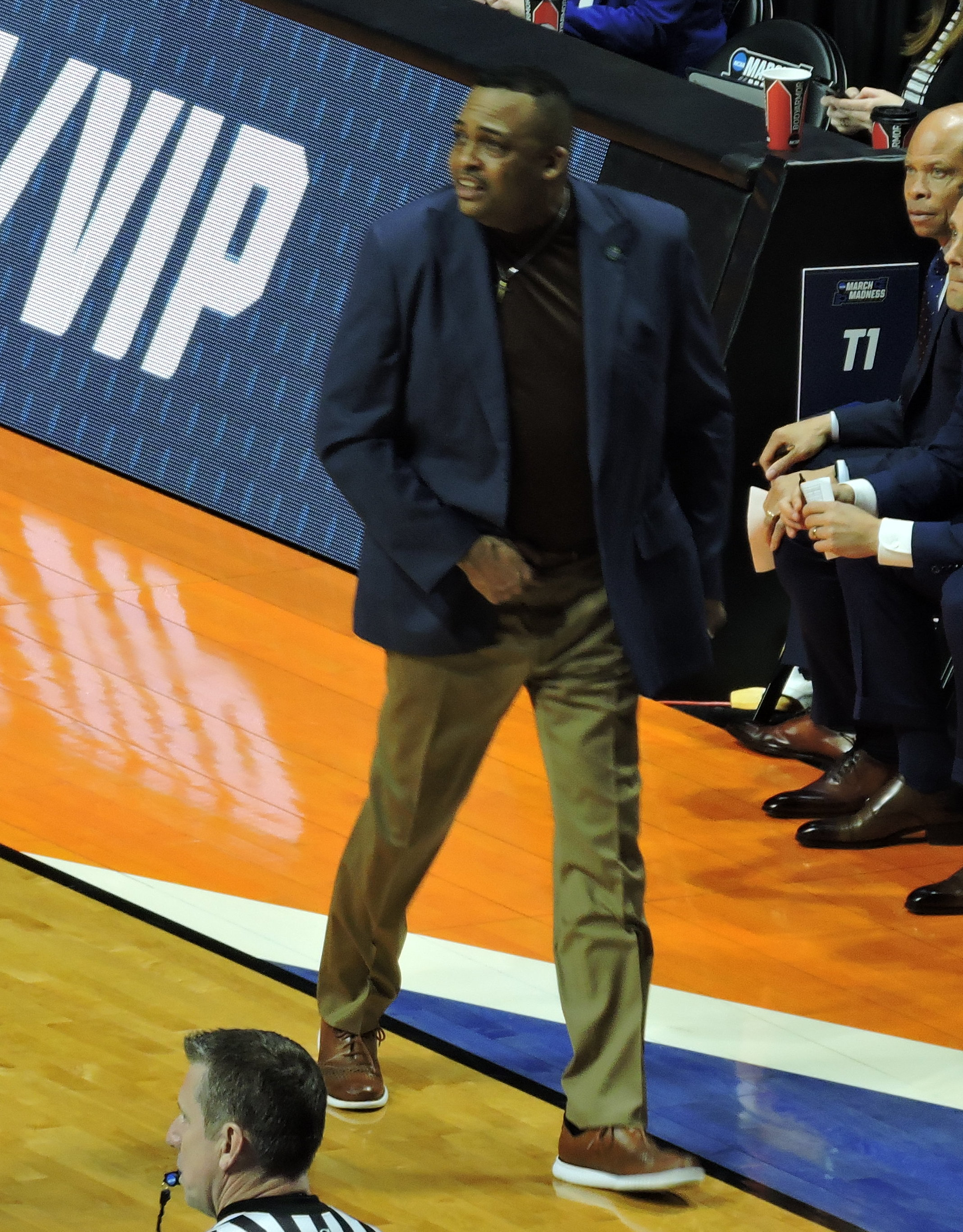

Current position
- Title: Head coach
- Team: Tulane
- Conference: The American
- Record: 108–105 (.507)

Biographical details
- Born: April 7, 1964 (age 62); Dayton, Ohio, U.S.

Playing career
- 1982–1986: Miami (OH)

Coaching career (HC unless noted)
- 1987–1993: Milwaukee (assistant)
- 1993–1994: Miami (OH) (assistant)
- 1994–2011: IUPUI
- 2011–2019: Georgia State
- 2019–present: Tulane

Head coaching record
- Overall: 553–419 (.569)
- Tournaments: 1–4 (NCAA Division I); 0–1 (NIT); 1–1 (CBI); 1–2 (CIT); 0–1 (CBC)

Accomplishments and honors

Championships
- Summit League tournament (2003); Summit League regular season (2006); 3 Sun Belt tournament (2015, 2018, 2019); 3 Sun Belt regular season (2014, 2015, 2019)

Awards
- 2× Summit League Coach of the Year (2003, 2006); Sun Belt Coach of the Year (2014)

Ronald Eugene Hunter (born April 7, 1964) is an American college basketball coach and the men's basketball head coach of the Tulane University Green Wave. His son, R. J. Hunter, was a first-round NBA draft pick for the Boston Celtics.

== High school ==
Hunter attended and played for Chaminade Julienne High School in Dayton, Ohio from 1978 to 1982.

== Coaching career ==
=== IUPUI ===
From 1994 to 2011, Hunter served as the head coach at IUPUI. Under his direction, the team advanced from an NAIA program to NCAA Division I. In its third season as a Division I program, Hunter led IUPUI to its first, and thus far only, NCAA tournament appearance in 2003. On January 24, 2008, Hunter coached a game against Oakland University while barefoot. He did this to benefit Samaritan's Feet, a foundation that works to provide hope and love to impoverished children around the world by washing their feet and giving them a new pair of shoes. His goal was to collect 40,000 shoes; however, before tip-off, over 110,000 pairs of shoes had been donated.

=== Georgia State ===
On March 21, 2011, it was announced Hunter would replace Rod Barnes as the Georgia State Panthers' men's basketball head coach. During his first season at GSU, Georgia State won 22 games, the fourth most in school history.

Hunter captured national attention for a moment that occurred in the 2015 NCAA tournament. After tearing his Achilles celebrating the Panthers' Sun Belt Conference tournament championship, he was forced to coach their subsequent NCAA appearance while sitting on a rolling stool due to his injury. In their first-round game against the three seed, Baylor, Hunter's son R. J. hit a deep, game-winning three with seconds left on the clock. When the shot went in, Hunter's stool slipped out from underneath him while exuberantly celebrating, sending him tumbling to the floor while continuing to display his jubilation. The moment spurred a torrent of media attention and resulted in multiple features, interviews, and a spot in 'One Shining Moment' at the conclusion of the tournament.

On November 20, 2017, in a win over Eastern Washington, Hunter earned his 400th career win.

Ron Hunter has played a key role in the ongoing transformation of the athletics culture at Georgia State, particularly with the basketball program and their continuing ascension from being one of the most unsuccessful programs in NCAA Division I history to being one of the premier Mid-Major programs in the nation. Some of Ron Hunter's most notable wins as head of coach of Georgia State are: VCU (2011), #16 Baylor (2015), Georgia (2018) and Alabama (2018). Hunter also notched a win against crosstown foe, Georgia Tech, in a 2017 charity exhibition known as the 'A-Town Showdown for Hurricane Relief'.

=== Tulane ===
On March 24, 2019, Hunter was named the head coach at Tulane, replacing Mike Dunleavy.

== Head coaching record ==
Record table
Season	Team	Overall	Conference	Standing	Postseason
IUPUI Jaguars (NAIA Independent) (1994–1998)
1994–95	IUPUI	16–13			
1995–96	IUPUI	22–7			
1996–97	IUPUI	16–11			
1997–98	IUPUI	17–9			
IUPUI Jaguars (Mid-Continent Conference/The Summit League) (1998–2011)
1998–99	IUPUI	11–16	6–8	6th	
1999–2000	IUPUI	7–21	4–12	8th	
2000–01	IUPUI	11–18	6–10	6th	
2001–02	IUPUI	15–15	6–8	6th	
2002–03	IUPUI	20–14	10–4	2nd	NCAA Division I Round of 64
2003–04	IUPUI	3–11*	2–6*	2nd	
2004–05	IUPUI	16–13	9–7	4th	
2005–06	IUPUI	19–10	13–3	T–1st	
2006–07	IUPUI	15–15	7–7	4th	
2007–08	IUPUI	26–7	15–3	2nd	
2008–09	IUPUI	16–14	9–9	4th	
2009–10	IUPUI	25–11	15–3	2nd	CBI Quarterfinals
2010–11	IUPUI	19–14	12–6	3rd	
IUPUI:		274–219 (.556)	114–86 (.570)		
Georgia State Panthers (Colonial Athletic Association) (2011–2013)
2011–12	Georgia State	22–12	11–7	5th	CIT Second round
2012–13	Georgia State	15–16	10–8	5th	
Georgia State Panthers (Sun Belt Conference) (2013–2019)
2013–14	Georgia State	25–9	17–1	1st	NIT first round
2014–15	Georgia State	25–10	15–5	1st	NCAA Division I Round of 32
2015–16	Georgia State	16–14	9–11	6th	
2016–17	Georgia State	20–13	12–6	2nd	CIT first round
2017–18	Georgia State	24–11	12–6	2nd	NCAA Division I Round of 64
2018–19	Georgia State	24–10	13–5	1st	NCAA Division I Round of 64
Georgia State:		171–95 (.643)	99–49 (.669)		
Tulane Green Wave (American Athletic Conference) (2019–present)
2019–20	Tulane	12–18	4–14	12th	
2020–21	Tulane	10–13	4–12	10th	
2021–22	Tulane	14–15	10–8	5th	
2022–23	Tulane	20–11	12–6	3rd	
2023–24	Tulane	14–17	5–13	T–10th	
2024–25	Tulane	19–15	12–6	4th	CBC First Round
2025–26	Tulane	18–15	8–10	T–8th	
2026–27	Tulane	1–1	0–0		
Tulane:		108–105 (.507)	55–69 (.444)		
Total:		553–419 (.569)			
National champion Postseason invitational champion Conference regular season champion Conference regular season and conference tournament champion Division regular season champion Division regular season and conference tournament champion Conference tournament champion

*18 wins (including 8 conference wins) vacated by NCAA

== Personal life ==
Hunter and his wife, Amy, have two children: Jasmine and Ronald (R. J.).
