= 2007–08 UMKC Kangaroos men's basketball team =

American college basketball season

2007–08 UMKC Kangaroos men's basketball
- Conference: The Summit League
- Record: 11–21, 2 wins vacated (6–12 Summit, 2 wins vacated)
- Head coach: Matt Brown (1st season)
- Assistant coaches: Kareem Richardson (1st season); Ed Kohtala (1st season); Martin Unger (1st season)
- Home arena: Municipal Auditorium, Kemper Arena

2007–08 Summit League men's basketball standings
	Conf.				Overall
Team	W		L	PCT	W		L	PCT
Oral Roberts †	16	–	2	.889	24	–	9	.727
IUPUI	15	–	3	.833	26	–	7	.788
Oakland	11	–	7	.611	17	–	14	.548
North Dakota State	10	–	8	.556	16	–	13	.552
Southern Utah	9	–	9	.500	11	–	19	.367
IPFW	9	–	9	.500	13	–	18	.419
Western Illinois	7	–	11	.389	12	–	18	.400
UMKC	6	–	12	.333	11	–	21	.344
Centenary	4	–	14	.222	10	–	21	.323
South Dakota State	3	–	15	.167	8	–	21	.276
† 2008 Summit League Tournament winner Rankings from AP Poll

The 2007–08 UMKC Kangaroos men's basketball team represented the University of Missouri–Kansas City during the 2007–08 NCAA Division I men's basketball season. The Kangaroos played their home games off-campus, most at Municipal Auditorium (with four at Kemper Arena) in Kansas City, Missouri, as a member of The Summit League (formerly named Mid–Continent Conference).

== Previous season ==
The Kangaroos finished the 2006–07 season with a record of 12–20 overall, 6–12 in the Mid–Continent Conference to finish in sixth place.

== Roster ==
2007–08 UMKC Kangaroos men's basketball team
Players
Coaches

Pos.	#	Name	Height	Weight	Year	Previous school	Hometown
G/F	22	Tim Blackwell	6 ft 4 in (1.93 m)	190 lb (86 kg)	Sr	Creighton; Cameron HS	Cameron, MO
F	4	Jeremiah Hartsock	6 ft 8 in (2.03 m)	215 lb (98 kg)	Sr	Bartlesville HS	Bartlesville, OK
F	15	Brent Stephens	6 ft 5 in (1.96 m)	210 lb (95 kg)	Sr	Monmouth; Jay HS	Jay, OK
F/C	33	Brian Gettinger	6 ft 8 in (2.03 m)	230 lb (104 kg)	RS Jr	Shawnee Mission South HS	Overland Park, KS
G	41	Akeem Hemingway	6 ft 0 in (1.83 m)	180 lb (82 kg)	RS Jr	Connors State; Fort Union Military/ Myrtle Beach HS	Myrtle Beach, SC
F	3	Dane Brumagin	6 ft 4 in (1.93 m)	195 lb (88 kg)	Jr	Warrenton Christian HS	Montgomery City, MO
F	32	Jakub Jurczak	6 ft 10 in (2.08 m)	215 lb (98 kg)	Jr	SMS Kozienice HS	Krosno, Poland
C	14	Alex Pledger	7 ft 1 in (2.16 m)	245 lb (111 kg)	Jr	Hamilton Boys' HS	Hamilton, New Zealand
F/C	35	Kenny Simms	6 ft 9 in (2.06 m)	250 lb (113 kg)	Jr	Florida International; Jackson Memorial HS	Jackson, NJ
G	2	Nathan Balch	6 ft 0 in (1.83 m)	170 lb (77 kg)	Fr	Olentangy HS	Westerville, OH
G	55	Fred Ford (redshirt)	5 ft 11 in (1.8 m)	175 lb (79 kg)	Fr	Ware Prep/ South Side HS	Fort Wayne, IN
G	23	Reggie Hamilton	6 ft 0 in (1.83 m)	175 lb (79 kg)	Fr	Thornwood HS	Harvey, IL
F	1	James Humphrey	6 ft 7 in (2.01 m)	195 lb (88 kg)	Fr	Fork Union Military; Paul Harding HS	Fort Wayne, IN
F	21	Spencer Johnson	6 ft 6 in (1.98 m)	200 lb (91 kg)	Fr	Laurinburg Institute/ Champaign Central HS	Champaign, IL

Head coach

- Matt Brown (Shippensburg)

Assistant coach(es)

- Kareem Richardson (Evansville)
- Ed Kohtala (Maine)
- Martin Unger (Western Carolina)

Legend

- (C) Team captain
- (S) Suspended
- (I) Ineligible
- (W) Walk-on
- (5Y) Fifth-year Senior
- Injured
- Current redshirt

Roster
Last update: November 3, 2024

== Schedule & Results ==
Date time, TV	Rank^{#}	Opponent^{#}	Result	Record	High points	High rebounds	High assists	Site (attendance) city, state
Exhibition Season
October 27, 2007*; 7:05 PM		Harris–Stowe State						Swinney Recreation Center; Kansas City, MO
Regular Season
November 11, 2007*; 7:00 PM		at No. 4 Kansas; Jayhawk Invitational [Multi–Team Event]	L 62–85	0–1	16 – Hartsock, Hamilton	8 – Hartsock	7 – Hamilton	Allen Fieldhouse (16,300); Lawrence, KS
November 13, 2007*; 7:05 PM		Washburn; Jayhawk Invitational [Multi–Team Event]	W 79–75	1–1	28 – Stephens	5 – Hartsock	4 – Hartsock	Municipal Auditorium (1,277); Kansas City, MO
November 17, 2007*; 3:07 PM		at Northern Arizona; Jayhawk Invitational [Multi–Team Event]	L 62–77	1–2	27 – Brumagin	5 – Gettinger, Brumagin	3 – Blackwell, Stephens	Joseph C. Rolle; Activity Center (932); Flagstaff, AZ
November 19, 2007*; 8:30 PM		at Arizona; Jayhawk Invitational [Multi–Team Event]	L 62–81	1–3	16 – Stephens	6 – Stephens	6 – Hamilton	McKale Memorial Center (13,349); Tempe, AZ
November 24, 2007*; 12:05 PM		Arkansas Tech	W 90–82	2–3	22 – Brumagin	8 – Brumagin	4 – Hamilton	Municipal Auditorium (1,106); Kansas City, MO
November 26, 2007*; 7:05 PM		Florida Atlantic	W 77–66	3–3	21 – Brumagin	6 – Hartsock, Stephens	8 – Hamilton	Municipal Auditorium (1,838); Kansas City, MO
November 29, 2007*; 7:00 PM		at UTSA	L 61–73	3–4	17 – Brumagin	7 – Stephens, Hamilton	5 – Blackwell	Convocation Center (805); San Antonio, TX
December 3, 2007*; 8:05 PM		Eastern Washington	L 54–65	3–5	19 – Hamilton	7 – Hartsock	3 – Stephens	Municipal Auditorium (1,157); Kansas City, MO
December 6, 2007; 6:00 PM		at Oakland	L 105–114 ^{OT}	3–6 (0–1)	40 – Brumagin	5 – Gettinger, Hamilton	5 – Blackwell	Athletics Center O'rena (1,165); Auburn Hills, MI
December 8, 2007; 3:00 PM, CATV		at IPFW	L 70–79	3–7 (0–2)	35 – Brumagin	5 – Brumagin	5 – Blackwell, Hartsock	Allen County; War Memorial Coliseum (1,961); Fort Wayne, IN
December 15, 2007*; 7:07 PM		Wichita State	W 59–56	4–7	13 – Brumagin, Hamilton	6 – Brumagin, Simms	4 – Hamilton	Municipal Auditorium (2,309); Kansas City, MO
December 19, 2007*; 7:05 PM		Northern Iowa	L 60–64 ^{OT}	4–8	21 – Blackwell	6 – Brumagin	3 – Hamilton	Municipal Auditorium (1,707); Kansas City, MO
December 22, 2007*; 12:05 PM		Loyola Chicago	W 77–66	5–8	24 – Blackwell	8 – Brumagin	3 – Stephens	Municipal Auditorium (1,318); Kansas City, MO
December 29, 2007*; 6:00 PM		at Central Arkansas	L 57–64	5–9	18 – Brumagin	9 – Brumagin	3 – Blackwell, Hamilton	Farris Center (443); Conway, AR
January 3, 2008; 7:05 PM		IUPUI	L 72–77	5–10 (0–3)	16 – Stephens	5 – Simms	6 – Hamilton	Municipal Auditorium (1,187); Kansas City, MO
January 5, 2008; 7:05 PM		Western Illinois	L 62–69	5–11 (0–4)	21 – Brumagin	7 – Gettinger	6 – Blackwell	Municipal Auditorium (2,441); Kansas City, MO
January 8, 2008*; 7:06 PM		at Missouri	L 76–96	5–12	20 – Stephens	8 – Brumagin	4 – Hamilton	Mizzou Arena (5,656); Columbia, MO
January 12, 2008; 7:05 PM		Southern Utah	W 63–60	6–12 (1–4)	21 – Brumagin	10 – Brumagin	4 – Blackwell, Humphrey	Municipal Auditorium (1,696); Kansas City, MO
January 17, 2008; 7:00 PM		at South Dakota State	W 64–58	7–12 (2–4)	20 – Brumagin	8 – Gettinger	4 – Stephens	Frost Arena (2,184); Brookings, SD
January 19, 2008; 7:05 PM		at North Dakota State	L 82–90	7–13 (2–5)	23 – Brumagin	6 – Brumagin, Simms	2 – Blackwell, Hartsock, Brumagin	Bison Sports Arena (3,341); Fargo, ND
January 24, 2008; 7:05 PM		Oral Roberts	L 47–75	7–14 (2–6)	12 – Balch	9 – Simms	2 – Brumagin, Balch, Johnson	Kemper Arena (1,503); Kansas City, MO
January 26, 2008; 7:05 PM		Centenary	W 76–73	8–14 (3–6)	29 – Brumagin	8 – Brumagin	5 – Blackwell	Kemper Arena (2,262); Kansas City, MO
January 31, 2008; 7:00 PM		at Western Illinois	L 62–77	8–15 (3–7)	17 – Blackwell	7 – Humphrey	4 – Hamilton	Western Hall (539); Macomb, IL
February 2, 2008; 6:00 PM		at IUPUI	L 70–90	8–16 (3–8)	17 – Hamilton	8 – Brumagin	7 – Hamilton	IUPUI Gymnasium (1,215); Indianapolis, IN
February 9, 2008; 8:30 PM		at Southern Utah	L 73–78	8–17 (3–9)	23 – Blackwell	7 – Simms	3 – Blackwell, Balch	Centrum Arena (2,158); Cedar City, UT
February 14, 2008; 7:05 PM		North Dakota State	L 44–73	8–18 (3–10)	10 – Hamilton	6 – Simms, Humphrey	2 – Hamilton	Kemper Arena (1,453); Kansas City, MO
February 16, 2008; 7:05 PM		South Dakota State	W 78–73	VACATED (League; Sanction)	23 – Blackwell	8 – Blackwell	3 – Blackwell	Kemper Arena (3,342); Kansas City, MO
February 21, 2008; 7:05 PM		at Oral Roberts	L 64–72	8–19 (3–11)	22 – Hamilton	6 – Hartsock	3 – Balch	Mabee Center (4,108); Tulsa, OK
February 23, 2008; 5:30 PM		at Centenary	W 75–65	9–19 (4–11)	20 – Hamilton	10 – Humphrey	3 – Blackwell, Hamilton, Humphrey	Gold Dome (1,681); Shreveport, LA
February 28, 2008; 7:05 PM		IPFW	W 75–57	VACATED (League; Sanction)	23 – Brumagin	7 – Brumagin, Hamilton	4 – Blackwell, Hamilton	Municipal Auditorium (2,546); Kansas City, MO
March 1, 2008; 7:05 PM		Oakland	L 75–85	9–20 (4–12)	23 – Hamilton	6 – Gettinger, Brumagin, Simms	5 – Blackwell	Municipal Auditorium (3,086); Kansas City, MO
League Tournament
March 8, 2008*; 8:30 PM	(7)	vs. (2) IUPUI [Quarterfinal]	L 65–69	9–21	19 – Blackwell	8 – Hamilton	7 – Hamilton	John Q. Hammons Arena (3,007); Tulsa, OK
*Non-conference game. ^{#}Rankings from AP Poll. (#) Tournament seedings in parentheses. All times are in Central Standard Time (CST).

Source
NOTE: The Summit League vacated (as opposed to forfeited) the victories of February 16 and February 28, resulting in neither a loss or win being reflected in the official league and overall record for those games.
