= Moses Ehambe =

American basketball player

Minnesota Timberwolves
- Title: Assistant coach / player development
- League: NBA

Personal information
- Born: May 22, 1986 (age 40) Arlington, Texas, U.S.
- Listed height: 6 ft 6 in (1.98 m)
- Listed weight: 215 lb (98 kg)

Career information
- High school: Mansfield Summit (Arlington, Texas)
- College: Oral Roberts (2004–2008)
- NBA draft: 2008: undrafted
- Playing career: 2008–2019
- Position: Shooting guard / small forward
- Number: 8
- Coaching career: 2024–2025

Career history

Playing
- 2008–2010: Tulsa 66ers
- 2010–2011: Club Ourense
- 2011: Austin Toros
- 2011–2012: Iowa Energy
- 2012–2013: Joventut Badalona
- 2013–2014: Iowa Energy
- 2014: Guaiqueríes de Margarita
- 2014–2015: Eisbären Bremerhaven
- 2015–2016: Kyoto Hannaryz
- 2016–2017: Rasta Vechta
- 2017–2018: Al-Shamal
- 2018–2019: ESSM Le Portel

Coaching
- 2020–2021: Oral Roberts (assistant)
- 2021–2022: Indiana Pacers (video/player development assistant)
- 2024–present: Minnesota Timberwolves (assistant)

Career highlights
- NBA D-League champion (2011); NBA D-League All-Star (2012); Jason Collier Sportsmanship Award (2012); Summit League tournament MVP (2008)
Medals
Men's basketball
Representing United States
Pan American Games
Bronze medal – third place	2011 Guadalajara	National team

Moses Randall Ehambe (born May 22, 1986) is an American former professional basketball player and coach, currently working as an assistant and player development coach for the Minnesota Timberwolves of the National Basketball Association (NBA). He played college basketball for Oral Roberts.

== College career ==
He played college basketball at Oral Roberts University.

== Professional career ==
In September 2011, he signed with the Iowa Energy for the 2011–2012 season.

In September 2012, he signed with FIATC Joventut of the Spanish ACB League for the 2012–13 season.

In November 2013, he was re-acquired by the Iowa Energy.

On April 29, 2014, he signed with Guaiqueríes de Margarita for the 2014 LPB season.

On August 1, 2014, he signed with Eisbären Bremerhaven of Germany for the 2014–15 season.

On December 18, 2015, he signed with Kyoto Hannaryz of the Japanese bj league.

On August 25, 2016, he signed with German club SC Rasta Vechta.

== Coaching career ==
On August 8, 2024, Ehambe was hired as an assistant coach / player development by the Minnesota Timberwolves. He left that job at the end of the 24-25 season.
