= Northland Christian School =

College-Prep Christian Private school located in Houston, Texas

Location
- 4363 Sylvanfield; Houston, Texas; United States
- Coordinates: 30.004956°N 95.470966°W

Information
- Type: Private Christian
- Religious affiliation: Christian
- Established: 1974
- Enrollment: 200 students (PK3-12)
- Colors: Black, Gold
- Mascot: Cougar
- Affiliations: List: Southern Association of Colleges and Schools; Texas Private School Accreditation Commission (TEPSAC); National Association of Christian Schools; National Association of Secondary School Principals; Texas Association of Non-Public Schools; Association for Supervision and Curriculum Development; Texas Association for College Admission Counseling; Texas Association of Private and Parochial Schools (TAPPS)
- Website: https://www.northlandchristian.org

Northland Christian School is a private, Christian, PK-12 school located in Northwest Houston, Texas, United States.

== History ==
Northland Christian School (NCS) was established in the spring of 1974. Seeking to create a school in their community that combined excellence in education with a commitment to teaching Biblical principles, a group of dedicated families from Bammel Church of Christ gathered $1,000 of seed money, sought teachers who shared their vision, and found a physical location for the school.

Instrumental in the founding of NCS were DeAnna and Jim Graves, in whose honor their elementary school building is named. DeAnna was Northland Christian's first Head of School, as well as one of its first dedicated teachers, among countless other roles. Jim Graves served as a board member for 20 years and supported Northland Christian in those crucial early years.

NCS officially opened in the fall of 1974 with a combined enrollment of 43 students.

== Campuses ==
As of the fall of 2019, the elementary and secondary schools are located on the same campus with grades PreK 3-12th grade. The students take classes in 7-8 different buildings depending on grade level.

=== Main campus ===
The Northland Christian School Campus is located on Sylvanfield Avenue, close to a major intersection of FM 1960 and Stuebner-Airline Road, and Bammel North Houston and Veterans Memorial (continued from Stuebner Airline).

== Standardized tests ==
Northland is exempt from TAKS (Texas Assessment of Knowledge and Skills) since it is a private school. Students in grades Kindergarten to 9th grade take the Stanford Achievement Test. Students in grades 3,5, and 7 take the OLSAT Achievement Test. In 7th grade, students identified as "gifted and talented" used to take the SAT Test for admission into Duke's TIP Program, before the Duke TIP Program shut down due to COVID-19. In 10 or 11th grade, students take the PSAT/NMSQT test. In 11th and/or 12th grade, students take the SAT and/or the ACT tests.

== Athletics ==
Northland Christian School offers athletics for both middle and high school students. All students are also required to participate in Physical Education or Athletics. There is an option for students participating in Olympic-level sports such as gymnastics, cheerleading, tumbling, soccer, taekwondo, karate, baseball, football, and swimming outside of school as off-campus PE to take study hall if they document at least 15 hours per week.

Northland Christian School provides the following sports: baseball, basketball, cheerleading, cross country, football, golf, soccer, softball, swimming, tennis, track, and volleyball.

Sixth grade students are allowed to try out for seventh grade teams. Eighth grade students are allowed to try out for high school sports if needed by the school to fill in the vacant spots, such as on the junior varsity baseball team. The sports services provided by Northland Christian School allow many students to participate in competitive leagues between other schools and do what they love to represent the Cougars.

== Extracurriculars ==
Northland Christian School provides a variety of fine arts courses of performing and visual arts. Courses such as art, drama, photography, orchestra, choir, and jazz ensemble are available.

The debate team has been sponsored and coached by members of the Lanier law firm and family, and has generally been seen by locals as the most successful extracurricular team Northland offers. The extracurricular options at Northland Christian School invite many to take part in their passions.
