= Carlos Knox =

American basketball player (born 1974)

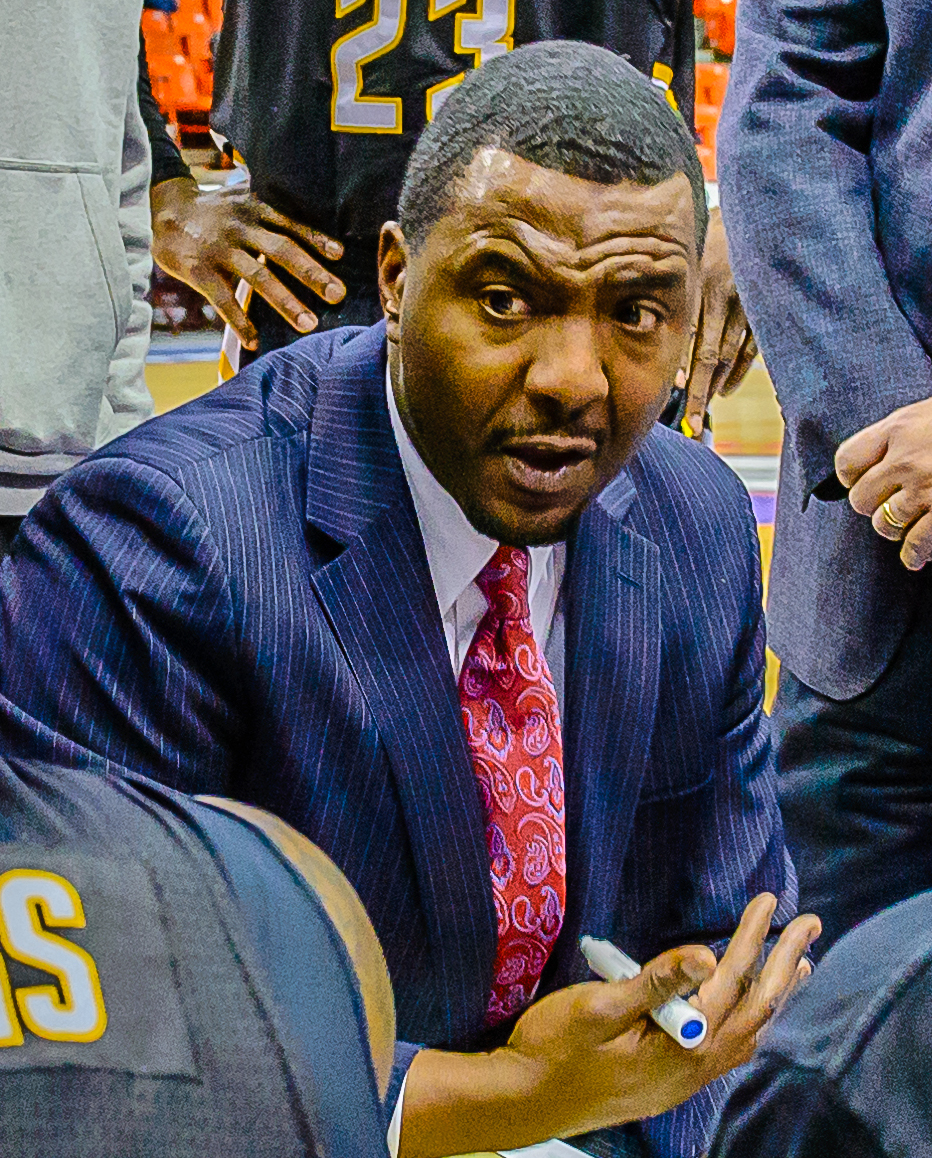
- Knox speaks during a time out in 2015

Personal information
- Born: October 7, 1974 (age 52)
- Listed height: 6 ft 2 in (1.88 m)
- Listed weight: 190 lb (86 kg)

Career information
- High school: Meadowdale (Dayton, Ohio)
- College: UT Martin (1993–1994); IUPUI (1994–1998)
- NBA draft: 1998: undrafted
- Coaching career: 2001–present

Career history

Coaching
- 2001–2002: IUPUI (assistant)
- 2004–2005: Dayton Jets
- 2005–2006: Indiana Alley Cats (assistant)
- 2006–2007: Indiana Alley Cats
- 2007–2008: Pittsburgh Xplosion
- 2008–2010: Al Hilal
- 2008–2009: Indiana Fever (assistant)
- 2013–2015: London Lightning
- 2022: Indiana Fever (interim head coach)

Career highlights
- 2× NCAA D-II scoring champion (1997, 1998); NCAA D-II Player of the Year (1998)

Carlos Knox (born October 7, 1974) is an American former basketball player . He is considered one of the best players to ever represent Indiana University – Purdue University Indianapolis, leading NCAA in scoring for two straight seasons. Knox was also named NCAA Player of the Year as a senior with the Jaguars. In 2004, he was inducted into the school's Hall of Fame and his jersey was hung in its basketball facility.

== Coaching record ==
Legend
Regular season	G	Games coached	W	Games won	L	Games lost	W–L %	Win–loss %
Playoffs	PG	Playoff games	PW	Playoff wins	PL	Playoff losses	PW–L %	Playoff win–loss %

Team	Year	G	W	L	W–L%	Finish	PG	PW	PL	PW–L%	Result
IND	2022	27	3	24	.111	6th in East	-	-	-	-	Missed Playoffs
Career		27	3	24	.111		0	0	0	–	
