= Hale Arena =

5,000-seat multi-purpose arena in Kansas City, Missouri

Coordinates: 39.090021°N 94.604591°W

Hale Arena is a 5,000-seat multi-purpose arena in Kansas City, Missouri. It was built in 1992 and was home to the former Kansas City Knights basketball team after they moved from Kemper Arena in 2003. It was named in honor of H. D. "Joe" Hale and his wife Joyce for their financial contribution. Hale Arena is home of the American Royal rodeo.

== Images ==
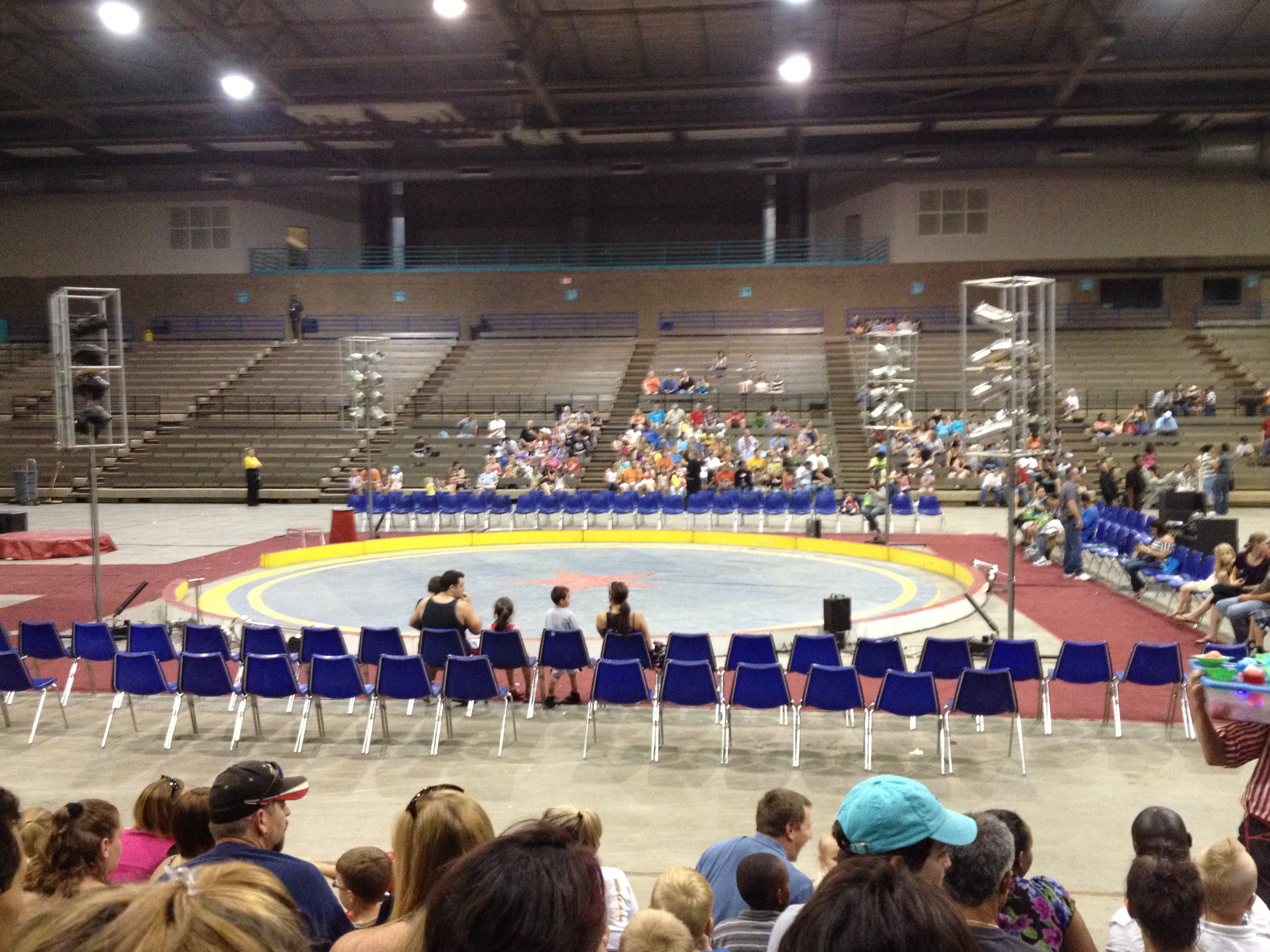
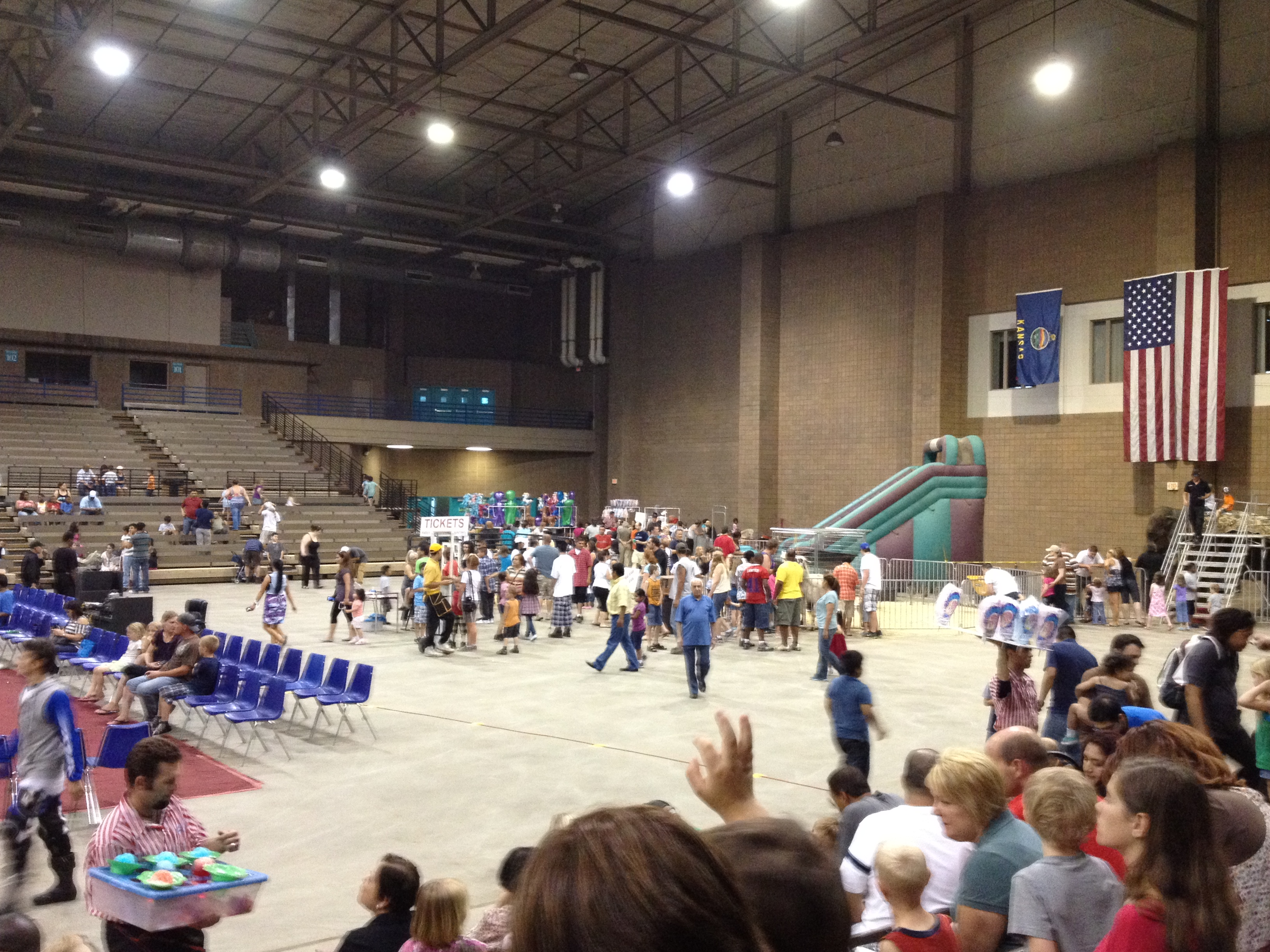
Interior of Hale Arena from East bleachers facing west.	Interior of Hale Arena from East bleachers facing northwest toward exit.
