= Alex Young (basketball) =

American basketball player (born 1989)

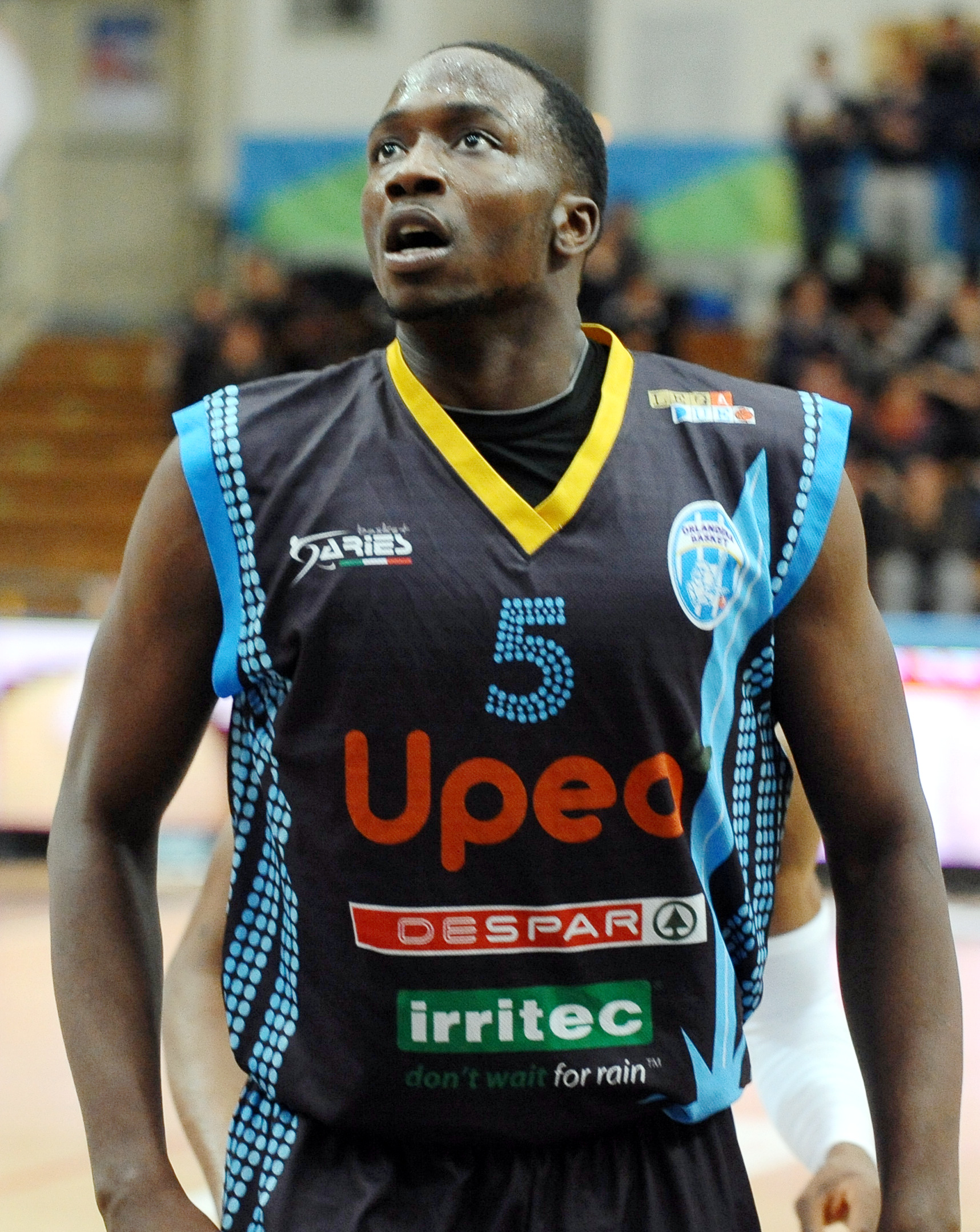
- Young with Capo d'Orlando in March 2013

Sharjah SC
- Position: Small forward / shooting guard
- League: UAE National Basketball League

Personal information
- Born: October 17, 1989 (age 37) Indianapolis, Indiana
- Listed height: 6 ft 6 in (1.98 m)
- Listed weight: 205 lb (93 kg)

Career information
- High school: Northwest (Indianapolis, Indiana)
- College: IUPUI (2008–2012)
- NBA draft: 2012: undrafted
- Playing career: 2012–present

Career history
- 2012–2013: Capo d'Orlando
- 2013–2014: Sigma Barcellona
- 2014–2015: Hapoel Gilboa Galil
- 2015–2017: Châlons-Reims
- 2017–2018: Ironi Nahariya
- 2018–2019: Enisey
- 2019: Beijing Bucks
- 2019–2020: Al Ahly
- 2021–present: Sharjah

Career highlights
- 2× Israeli League All-Star (2015, 2018); 3× First-team All-Summit League (2010–2012)

Alex Young (born October 17, 1989) is an American professional basketball player for Sharjah of the UAE National Basketball League. He played college basketball for the IUPUI Jaguars before playing professionally in Italy, Israel, France, Russia and China.

== Early life and college career ==
Young attended Northwest High School in Indianapolis, Indiana, where he was the 2008 Indianapolis City and Indianapolis Public Schools Player of the Year. Young averaged 18.6 points and 13.7 rebounds per game as a senior, ranking third in the state in rebounding, shooting 52.7 percent from the floor and 34.3 percent from three-point range in his final season.

Young played college basketball for IUPUI's Jaguars, where he led the Jaguars in scoring (20.4 ppg), rebounding (5.9 rpg), blocks (32), steals (50), threes made (59) and free throws made (156). Young was named three-time First team All-Summit League, two-time First team NABC All-District (12) and Summit League All-Tournament Team.

== Professional career ==
=== Capo d'Orlando (2012–2013) ===
After going undrafted in the 2012 NBA draft, Young joined the Sacramento Kings for the 2012 NBA Summer League.

On August 10, 2012, Young started his professional career with Capo d'Orlando of the Italian Serie A2, signing a one-year deal.

=== Sigma Barcellona (2013–2014) ===
On July 8, 2013, Young joined the Golden State Warriors for the 2013 NBA Summer League.

On July 22, 2013, Young signed with Sigma Barcellona for the 2013–2014 season. On January 5, 2014, Young recorded a season-high 35 points, shooting 12-of-18 from the field, along with five rebounds and two steals in an 82–95 loss to Veroli Basket.

=== Hapoel Gilboa Galil (2014–2015) ===
On August 1, 2014, Young signed with the Israeli team Hapoel Gilboa Galil for the 2014–15 season. On March 3, 2015, Young participated in the Israeli League All-Star game.

=== Châlons-Reims (2015–2017) ===
On July 28, 2015, Young signed a two-year deal with the French team Châlons-Reims. On December 17, 2016, Young recorded a season-high 33 points, shooting 8-of-10 from 3-point range, along with three rebounds and four steals in an 84–89 loss to Orléans Loiret Basket.

=== Ironi Nahariya (2017–2018) ===
On July 17, 2017, Young returned to Israel for a second stint, signing with Ironi Nahariya for the 2017–18 season. In October 2017, Young helped Nahariya to reach the 2017 Israeli League Cup Final, where they eventually lost to Maccabi Tel Aviv. On November 2, 2017, Young was named Israeli League Player of the Month for games played in October. On November 18, 2017, Young recorded a season-high 36 points, along with seven rebounds, three assists and three steals in an 88–92 loss to Maccabi Rishon LeZion. On May 17, 2018, Young scored 15 points, including a game-winning 3-pointer in a 77–76 win over Maccabi Ashdod that helped Nahariya to secure their place in the Israeli Premier League for another season.

=== Enisey (2018–2019) ===
On July 11, 2018, Young signed a one-year deal with the Russian team Enisey of the VTB United League.

=== Beijing Bucks (2019) ===
On May 24, 2019, Young signed with the Beijing Bucks for the 2019 NBL season. On July 17, 2019, Young recorded a double-double of 11 rebounds and a career-high 54 points, shooting 11-of-22 from three-point range, along with three assists in a 108–132 loss to the Guangxi Rhino.

=== Al Ahly (2019–2020) ===
On July 24, 2019, Young signed a one-year deal with Al Ahly of the Egyptian Super League.

=== Sharjah (2021–present) ===
On September 23, 2021, Young was announced by Sharjah of the UAE National Basketball League.

== Career statistics ==
Legend
GP	Games played	MPG	Minutes per game	FG%	Field goal percentage
3P%	3-point field goal percentage	FT%	Free throw percentage	RPG	Rebounds per game
APG	Assists per game	SPG	Steals per game	BPG	Blocks per game
PPG	Points per game	**Bold**	Career high		Led the league

=== Domestic Leagues ===
Year	Team	League	GP	MPG	FG%	3P%	FT%	RPG	APG	SPG	BPG	PPG
2012–13	(Italy) Orlandina	Serie A2	16	29.9	.447	.284	.680	5.5	1.1	1.8	.4	19.5
2013–14	(Italy) Barcellona	Serie A2	**34**	33.0	.473	.360	**.787**	6.4	.7	1.3	.5	19.5
2014–15	(Israel) Gilboa Galil	IPL	32	29.5	.403	.310	.766	5.4	2.0	1.1	.6	15.5
2015–16	(France) Châlons-Reims	Pro A	**34**	28.7	.434	.331	.782	4.4	1.3	1.3	.3	14.3
2016–17	(France) Châlons-Reims	Pro A	32	28.9	.433	**.370**	.727	3.5	1.4	1	.5	14.8
2017–18	(Israel) Nahariya	IPL	33	33.3	.444	.294	.769	5.3	2.2	**2.1**	**.7**	17.0
2018–19	(Russia) Enisey	VTB	18	26.2	.407	.338	.690	3.9	1.4	1.1	.1	12.1
2019	(China) Beijing Bucks	NBL	14	**38.5**	**.506**	.312	.741	**7.4**	**4.1**	1.7	.6	**32.6**

Source: RealGM & Eurobasket
