= 2008–09 North Dakota State Bison men's basketball team =

American college basketball season

2008–09 North Dakota State Bison men's basketball
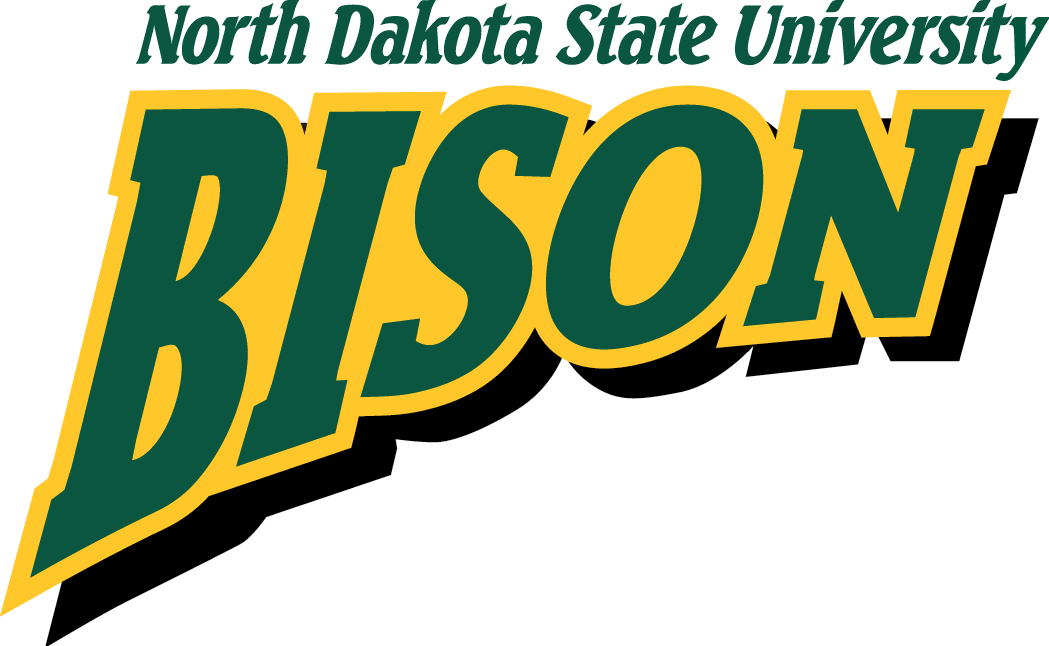

Summit League Regular Season and Tournament Champions

NCAA tournament first round vs Kansas, L 74–84
- Conference: The Summit League
- Record: 26–7 (16–2 Summit League)
- Head coach: Saul Phillips
- Assistant coaches: David Richman; Jason Kemp; Will Ryan
- Home arena: Bison Sports Arena

The 2008–09 North Dakota State Bison men's basketball team represented North Dakota State University. The head coach was Saul Phillips. The team played its home games in the Bison Sports Arena in Fargo, North Dakota, and was a member of the Summit League. They received an automatic berth to the NCAA tournament after winning The Summit League men's basketball tournament in their first year of eligibility, the first team to do so since Long Beach State in 1970.
