= North Dakota State Bison men's basketball statistical leaders =

The North Dakota State Bison men's basketball statistical leaders are individual statistical leaders of the North Dakota State Bison men's basketball program in various categories, including points, three-pointers, assists, blocks, rebounds, and steals. Within those areas, the lists identify single-game, single-season, and career leaders. The Bison represent North Dakota State University in the NCAA's Summit League.

North Dakota State began competing in intercollegiate basketball in 1897. However, the school's record book does not generally list records from before the 1950s, as records from before this period are often incomplete and inconsistent. Since scoring was much lower in this era, and teams played much fewer games during a typical season, it is likely that few or no players from this era would appear on these lists anyway.

An added complication in statistical recording is that North Dakota State did not begin playing in Division I until the 2004–05 season, having previously been in Division II. This is significant because the NCAA did not officially record assists, blocks, and steals in D-II until several years after it began doing so in D-I. The NCAA briefly recorded assists as a statistic in 1950–51 and 1951–52, before the NCAA first split into divisions in 1956. However, after 1952, assists were not officially recorded again in D-I until the 1983–84 season. Blocks and steals were first officially recorded in D-I in the 1985–86 season. By contrast, assists were not officially recorded in D-II until 1988–89, and blocks and steals were not officially recorded in that division until 1992–93. Nonetheless, North Dakota State's record books includes players in these statistics before these seasons. These lists are updated through the end of the 2020–21 season.

== Scoring ==
Career
Rk	Player	Points	Seasons
1	Ben Woodside	2315	2005–06 2006–07 2007–08 2008–09
2	Brett Winkelman	1962	2005–06 2006–07 2007–08 2008–09
3	Denver TenBroek	1813	1999–00 2000–01 2001–02 2002–03
4	Lawrence Alexander	1755	2011–12 2012–13 2013–14 2014–15
5	Paul Miller	1719	2014–15 2015–16 2016–17 2017–18
6	Joe Regnier	1717	1985–86 1986–87 1987–88 1988–89
7	Jeff Askew	1694	1979–80 1980–81 1981–82 1982–83
8	Rocky Kreuser	1675	2017–18 2018–19 2019–20 2020–21 2021–22
9	Steve Saladino	1652	1972–73 1973–74 1974–75 1975–76
10	Taylor Braun	1651	2010–11 2011–12 2012–13 2013–14

Season
Rk	Player	Points	Season
1	Ben Woodside	766	2008–09
2	Denver TenBroek	666	2002–03
3	Lawrence Alexander	624	2014–15
4	Brett Winkelman	613	2008–09
5	Vinnie Shahid	608	2019–20
6	Paul Miller	605	2017–18
7	Ben Woodside	599	2007–08
8	Lance Berwald	598	1983–84
9	Paul Shogren	586	1977–78
10	Mike Kuppich	576	1971–72

Single game
Rk	Player	Points	Season	Opponent
1	Ben Woodside	60	2008–09	Stephen F. Austin
2	Lance Berwald	53	1983–84	Minn. State Mankato
3	Ron Schlieman	50	1967–68	Houston
4	Marv Bachmeier	47	1959–60	Concordia-Moorhead
	Marv Bachmeier	47	1959–60	Morningside
6	Marv Bachmeier	46	1958–59	Northern Iowa
7	Denver TenBroek	43	2002–03	Augustana (S.D.)
	Marv Bachmeier	43	1959–60	Northern Iowa
9	Lance Berwald	42	1983–84	Augustana (S.D.)
	Ron McLeod	42	1961–62	Morningside

== Rebounds ==
Career
Rk	Player	Rebounds	Seasons
1	Brett Winkelman	874	2005–06 2006–07 2007–08 2008–09
2	Joe Regnier	872	1985–86 1986–87 1987–88 1988–89
3	Steve Saladino	853	1972–73 1973–74 1974–75 1975–76
4	John Wojtak	831	1968–69 1969–70 1970–71
	Rocky Kreuser	831	2017–18 2018–19 2019–20 2020–21 2021–22
6	Mike Kuppich	744	1969–70 1970–71 1971–72
7	Dan Wilberscheid	731	1984–85 1985–86 1986–87 1987–88
8	Tyson Ward	729	2016–17 2017–18 2018–19 2019–20
9	Marshall Bjorklund	682	2010–11 2011–12 2012–13 2013–14
10	Gerry Suman	677	1964–65 1965–66 1966–67

Season
Rk	Player	Rebounds	Season
1	John Wojtak	298	1970–71
2	Grant Nelson	278	2022–23
3	Mike Kuppich	271	1971–72
	John Wojtak	271	1968–69
5	Lance Berwald	266	1983–84
6	Steve Saladino	265	1973–74
	John McPhaul	265	1982–83
8	John Wojtak	262	1969–70
9	Steve Saladino	258	1975–76
10	Rocky Kreuser	257	2021–22

Single game
Rk	Player	Rebounds	Season	Opponent
1	Roger Erickson	24	1959–60	North Dakota
	Gene Gamache	24	1954–55	North Dakota
	Robert Lauf	24	1953–54	Northern Iowa
4	Jerry Kingrey	23	1957–58	North Dakota
	Jerry Kingrey	23	1957–58	North Dakota
6	Grant Nelson	22	2022–23	South Dakota State
	Cliff Bell	22	1976–77	South Dakota State
	Jerry Kingrey	22	1957–58	Northern Iowa
9	Bruce Shockman	21	1980–81	Northern Colorado
	John Wojtak	21	1970–71	Northern Iowa
	Lynden Langen	21	1962–63	Wyoming
	Mike Kuppich	21	1969–70	Minn. State Mankato

== Assists ==
Career
Rk	Player	Assists	Seasons
1	Jeff Askew	684	1979–80 1980–81 1981–82 1982–83
2	Ben Woodside	640	2005–06 2006–07 2007–08 2008–09
3	David Ryles	639	1983–84 1984–85 1985–86 1986–87
4	Mike Driscoll	513	1977–78 1978–79 1979–80 1980–81
5	Mark Emerson	417	1972–73 1973–74 1974–75 1975–76
6	Lawrence Alexander	408	2011–12 2012–13 2013–14 2014–15
7	Craig Aamot	363	1993–94 1994–95
8	Pat Driscoll	354	1968–69 1969–70 1970–71
9	Ben Nemmers	353	2000–01 2001–02 2002–03 2003–04
10	Bart Inniger	347	1988–89 1989–90 1990–91 1991–92

Season
Rk	Player	Assists	Season
1	David Ryles	230	1986–87
2	Craig Aamot	211	1993–94
3	Ben Woodside	204	2008–09
4	Jeff Askew	193	1981–82
5	Jeff Askew	183	1982–83
6	David Ryles	178	1985–86
7	Jeff Askew	172	1979–80
8	Andy Stefonowicz	167	2025–26
9	Bart Inniger	154	1990–91
10	Craig Aamot	152	1994–95

Single game
Rk	Player	Assists	Season	Opponent
1	David Ryles	16	1986–87	Northern Colorado
2	David Ryles	15	1986–87	Morningside
	Jeff Askew	15	1981–82	SW Minnesota State
4	Bart Inniger	14	1990–91	Viterbo
5	Ben Nemmers	13	2001–02	Minot State
	Craig Aamot	13	1994–95	Jamestown
7	Bart Inniger	12	1990–91	St. Cloud State
	Craig Aamot	12	1993–94	Augustana (S.D.)
	David Ryles	12	1985–86	Northern Colorado
	David Ryles	12	1986–87	Minn. State Mankato
	David Ryles	12	1986–87	Valley City State
	Mark McGehee	12	1996–97	Augustana (S.D.)
	Sam Griesel	12	2020–21	TCU

== Steals ==
Career
Rk	Player	Steals	Seasons
1	David Ryles	275	1983–84 1984–85 1985–86 1986–87
2	Jeff Askew	255	1979–80 1980–81 1981–82 1982–83
3	Paul Shogren	181	1975–76 1976–77 1977–78 1978–79
4	Mike Driscoll	177	1977–78 1978–79 1979–80 1980–81
5	Ben Woodside	176	2005–06 2006–07 2007–08 2008–09
6	Brady Lipp	167	1977–78 1978–79 1979–80 1980–81
7	Juno Pintar	164	1985–86 1986–87 1987–88 1988–89
8	Taylor Braun	153	2010–11 2011–12 2012–13 2013–14
9	Brett Winkelman	150	2005–06 2006–07 2007–08 2008–09
10	Bart Inniger	147	1988–89 1989–90 1990–91 1991–92

Season
Rk	Player	Steals	Season
1	David Ryles	86	1986–87
2	Ewell Clinton	75	1996–97
3	David Ryles	72	1983–84
	David Ryles	72	1985–86
5	Paul Shogren	71	1977–78
	Jeff Askew	71	1981–82
7	Jeff Askew	70	1982–83
8	Mark McGehee	64	1996–97
9	Trevian Carson	63	2025–26
10	Brady Lipp	61	1979–80
	Mark McGehee	61	1997–98

Single game
Rk	Player	Steals	Season	Opponent
1	David Ryles	8	1986–87	Minot State
2	Bart Inniger	7	1990–91	Mary
	David Ryles	7	1985–86	Northern Colorado
	Kelvin Wynn	7	1981–82	Augustana (S.D.)
	Mike Driscoll	7	1980–81	Minnesota-Morris
	Tom Foti	7	1988–89	South Dakota State

== Blocks ==
Career
Rk	Player	Blocks	Seasons
1	Jason Wenschlag	220	1989–90 1990–91 1991–92 1992–93
2	TrayVonn Wright	176	2010–11 2011–12 2012–13 2013–14
3	Rocky Kreuser	118	2017–18 2018–19 2019–20 2020–21 2021–22
4	Grant Nelson	113	2020–21 2021–22 2022–23
5	Chris Kading	112	2012–13 2013–14 2014–15 2015–16
6	Dexter Werner	98	2013–14 2014–15 2015–16 2016–17
7	Jordan Aaberg	90	2009–10 2011–12 2012–13 2013–14
8	Jeff Giersch	89	1980–81 1981–82
9	Kory Brown	84	2012–13 2013–14 2014–15 2015–16
10	Lance Berwald	81	1982–83 1983–84

Season
Rk	Player	Blocks	Season
1	Jason Wenschlag	89	1991–92
2	TrayVonn Wright	61	2012–13
3	Jason Wenschlag	58	1992–93
4	TrayVonn Wright	56	2013–14
5	Jason Wenschlag	55	1990–91
6	Jeff Giersch	51	1981–82
7	Grant Nelson	50	2022–23
8	Joe Regnier	49	1986–87
9	Chris Kading	47	2014–15
	Lance Berwald	47	1982–83
	Greg Monson	47	1979–80

Single game
Rk	Player	Blocks	Season	Opponent
1	Jason Wenschlag	7	1990–91	South Dakota State
2	Noah Feddersen	6	2025–26	Cal State Northridge
	Dexter Werner	6	2015–16	Montana State
	Dexter Werner	6	2014–15	Minnesota-Crookston
	Jordan Aaberg	6	2009–10	Green Bay
	Andy Kelchen	6	2004–05	Minnesota-Crookston
	Jason Wenschlag	6	1992–93	Troy
	Jason Wenschlag	6	1992–93	Northern Michigan
	Jason Wenschlag	6	1991–92	Northern Colorado
	Jason Wenschlag	6	1991–92	Lewis
	Lance Berwald	6	1982–83	Minn. State Moorhead
	Jeff Giersch	6	1980–81	Seattle Pacific
	Greg Monson	6	1979–80	South Dakota
