= Nate Wolters =

American basketball player (born 1991)

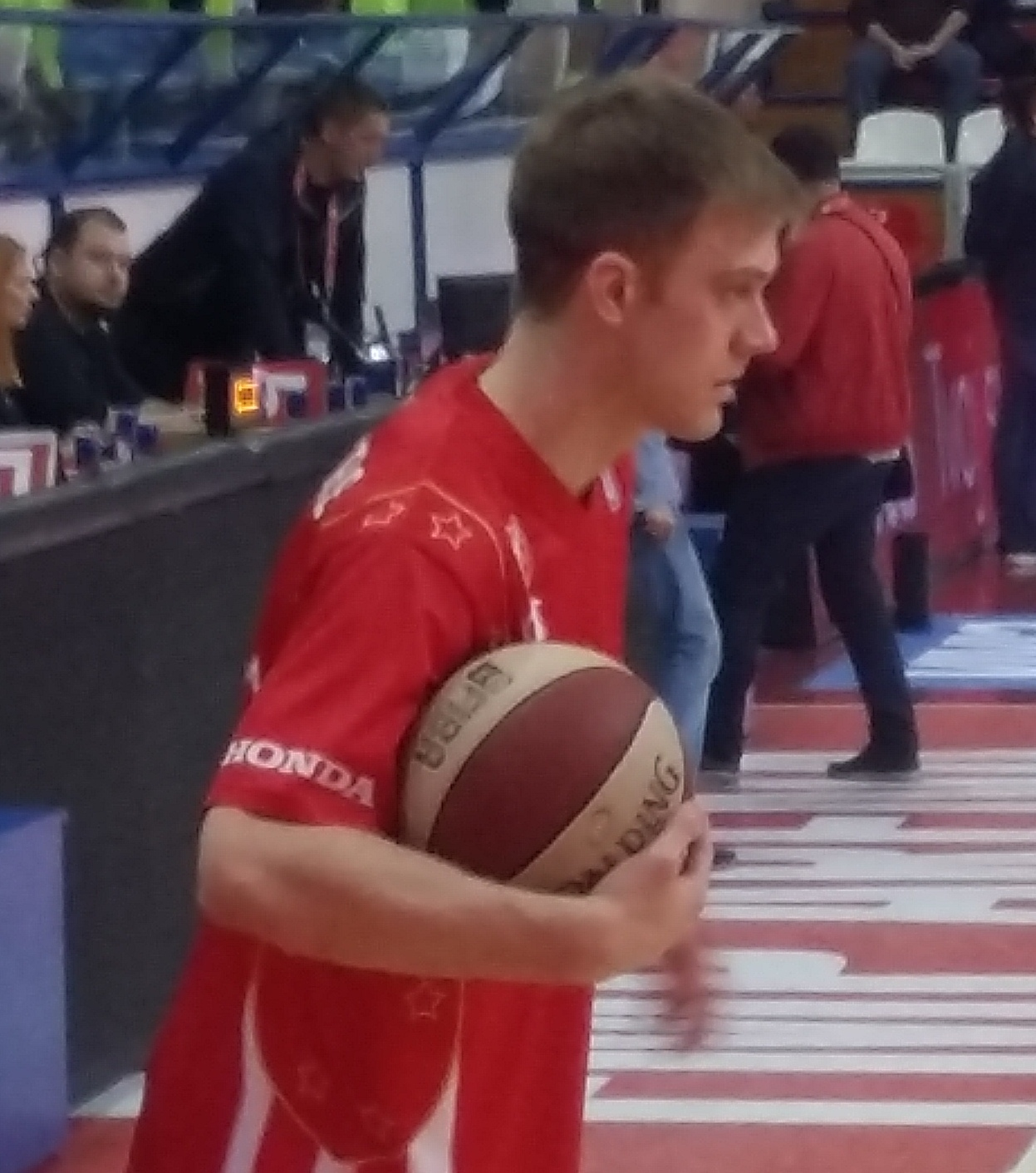
- Wolters with Crvena zvezda in 2017

Personal information
- Born: May 15, 1991 (age 35) St. Cloud, Minnesota, U.S.
- Listed height: 6 ft 4 in (1.93 m)
- Listed weight: 190 lb (86 kg)

Career information
- High school: St. Cloud Tech (St. Cloud, Minnesota)
- College: South Dakota State (2009–2013)
- NBA draft: 2013: 2nd round, 38th overall pick
- Drafted by: Washington Wizards
- Playing career: 2013–2023
- Position: Point guard
- Number: 3, 4, 6, 7, 14, 16

Career history
- 2013–2015: Milwaukee Bucks
- 2015: New Orleans Pelicans
- 2015: Grand Rapids Drive
- 2015–2016: Beşiktaş
- 2016–2017: Crvena zvezda
- 2017: Utah Jazz
- 2017: →Salt Lake City Stars
- 2018: Élan Chalon
- 2018–2019: Žalgiris Kaunas
- 2019–2020: Maccabi Tel Aviv
- 2020–2021: UNICS Kazan
- 2021–2022: Crvena zvezda
- 2022–2023: Panathinaikos

Career highlights
- Lithuanian League champion (2019); 2× ABA League champion (2017, 2022); Serbian League champion (2017); 2× Serbian Cup winner (2017, 2022); Serbian Cup MVP (2022); Greek League All-Star (2022); Third-team All-American – AP (2013); Honorable mention All-American – AP (2012); Summit League Player of the Year (2013); 3× First-team All-Summit League (2011–2013); 2× Summit League tournament MVP (2012, 2013)
- Stats at NBA.com
- Stats at Basketball Reference

Nate Wolters (born May 15, 1991) is an American former professional basketball player. He played college basketball for South Dakota State University and was an All-American for the Jackrabbits in 2013. He was selected by the Washington Wizards with the 38th overall pick in the 2013 NBA draft.

== College career ==
Wolters, a 6'4" point guard from Technical Senior High School in St. Cloud, Minnesota, chose South Dakota State over Colorado State and North Dakota State after averaging 24.3 points and 6.4 rebounds per game as a senior. As a freshman, Wolters played in all 30 games for the Jackrabbits, starting 11. For the season he averaged 10.1 points, 3.4 rebounds and 2.9 assists per game and was named to The Summit League all-newcomer team. In his sophomore season, Wolters moved into the starting lineup full-time and became one of the conference's top players. He averaged 19.5 points, 4.6 rebounds and 6.1 assists. He led the league in assists and helped the team to a 19–12 record—the program's first winning season as a member of NCAA Division I.

As a junior, Wolters led the team to more new territory. The team finished the 2011–12 season with a 27–7 record, finishing second in the Summit League regular season. The second-seeded Jackrabbits beat Western Illinois 52–50 in overtime to advance to their first Division I NCAA tournament. Wolters was named tournament Most Valuable Player. In the NCAA Tournament, #14 seed South Dakota State played third-seeded Baylor in a tightly contested game, ultimately losing 68–60. Individually, Wolters averaged 21.2 points, 5.9 assists (again leading the conference) and 5.1 rebounds per game. He was named first team all-conference and an honorable mention All-American by the Associated Press.

Entering his senior season, Wolters was named preseason Summit League player of the year. He also was named to the preseason watch lists for the Senior CLASS Award and the Naismith College Player of the Year award. He also made the midseason lists for the Wooden Award (final 25 candidates) and the Bob Cousy Award (final 20). On January 18, 2013, Wolters surpassed the 2,000 point mark for his college career in a win against Western Illinois. Wolters led the Jackrabbits to their second NCAA Men's Division I Basketball Tournament in 2013. A No. 13 seed, they played No. 4 seed Michigan, losing 71–56.

== Professional career ==
=== Milwaukee Bucks (2013–2015) ===
Wolters was selected with the 38th overall pick in 2013 NBA draft by the Washington Wizards. He was later traded to the Philadelphia 76ers on draft night. The next day, he was again traded, this time to the Milwaukee Bucks. In July 2013, he joined the Bucks for the 2013 NBA Summer League and went on to sign his rookie scale contract with the franchise on August 1. As the only healthy point guard the Bucks had on opening night of the 2013–14 season, Wolters ended up playing 30 minutes in his NBA debut, recording nine points, one rebound, four assists, one steal and one block in a 90–83 loss to the New York Knicks. With Luke Ridnour and Brandon Knight out injured, Wolters started seven of Milwaukee's first nine games and averaged 26.2 minutes per game in November. Wolters averaged 8.3 points and 2.7 assists in 17 games after the All-Star break and later started the last 24 games he played in during his rookie season, most of the time alongside Knight as former coach Larry Drew opted to start two point guards. His season ended, however, with 13 games left in the regular season when he suffered a fractured left hand fighting through a screen at Golden State on March 20.

His hand injury did not require surgery and didn't prevent Wolters from missing any time in the offseason as he re-joined the Bucks for the 2014 NBA Summer League. He went on to play sparingly to begin the 2014–15 season under new head coach Jason Kidd and was eventually waived by the Bucks on January 9, 2015, to create roster space to sign veteran big man Kenyon Martin.

=== New Orleans Pelicans (2015) ===
On January 14, 2015, Wolters signed a 10-day contract with the New Orleans Pelicans. Two days later, he made his debut for the Pelicans in a 96–81 loss to the Philadelphia 76ers, recording two rebounds and one assist in six minutes off the bench. On January 24, 2015, he signed a second 10-day contract with the Pelicans. Following the conclusion of his second 10-day contract on February 3, the Pelicans decided against signing him for the rest of the season.

=== Grand Rapids Drive (2015) ===
On March 6, 2015, Wolters was acquired by the Grand Rapids Drive of the NBA Development League. The next day, he made his D-League debut in a 105–96 loss to the Sioux Falls Skyforce, recording five points, two rebounds and four assists in 21 minutes off the bench. On March 29, 2015, Wolters recorded his first career triple-double after posting 24 points, 11 rebounds and 11 assists in a 108–107 win over the Maine Red Claws.

=== Beşiktaş (2015–2016) ===
In July 2015, Wolters joined the Los Angeles Clippers for the 2015 NBA Summer League. However, a fractured middle finger on his left hand ended his summer league stint early after appearing in just three games.

On July 24, 2015, Wolters signed with Turkish team Beşiktaş Sompo Japan for the 2015–16 season. On March 24, 2016, he parted ways with Beşiktaş. In 21 Turkish national league games, he averaged 11.6 points, 4.6 rebounds and 5.4 assists per game.

On September 15, 2016, Wolters signed with the Denver Nuggets, but was waived on October 22 after appearing in four preseason games.

=== Crvena zvezda (2016–2017) ===
On October 24, 2016, Wolters signed a one-year deal with Serbian team Crvena zvezda.

=== Utah Jazz (2017) ===
On September 13, 2017, Wolters signed a two-way contract with the Utah Jazz. Under the terms of the deal, he split time between the Jazz and their NBA G League affiliate, the Salt Lake City Stars. On December 22, 2017, he was waived by the Jazz after appearing in five games.

=== Élan Chalon (2018) ===
On January 17, 2018, Wolters signed with Élan Chalon in France.

=== Žalgiris Kaunas (2018–2019) ===
On July 8, 2018, Wolters joined Žalgiris Kaunas of the Lithuanian Basketball League, signing a one-year deal with an option for another one. Wolters helped Žalgiris reach the 2019 EuroLeague Playoffs, where they eventually were eliminated by Fenerbahçe. He also helped Žalgiris win their 9th consecutive LKL championship.

=== Maccabi Tel Aviv (2019–2020) ===
On June 23, 2019, Wolters signed a two-year deal with Maccabi Tel Aviv of the Israeli Premier League and the EuroLeague. He averaged 7.5 points and 2.6 assists per game in Euroleague.

=== BC UNICS (2020–2021) ===
On July 25, 2020, Wolters signed with Russian club UNICS Kazan of the VTB United League and the EuroCup. He averaged 8.3 points and 3.0 assists per game.

=== Return to Crvena zvezda (2021–2022) ===
On August 10, 2021, Wolters returned to Crvena zvezda for a second stint with the Serbian club. He won the ABA League and Serbian Cup in the 2021–22 season with them. He received the Radivoj Korać Cup MVP Award. In June 2022, Wolters went to the U.S. upon the club's approval on personal matters, excluding him for the Serbian League season.

=== Panathinaikos (2022–2023) ===
On July 15, 2022, Wolters signed a one-year contract with Panathinaikos of the Greek Basket League and the EuroLeague. In 23 EuroLeague games (17 starts), he averaged 7.9 points, 2.3 rebounds and 2.9 assists, playing around 21 minutes per contest. Additionally, in 14 domestic league matches, he averaged 6 points, 3 rebounds and 2.6 assists, playing around 17 minutes per contest. Wolters suffered multiple injuries throughout the season and was eventually excluded from the club's final roster for the Greek Basket League play-offs, thus ending his stint with the Greens prematurely. On July 2, 2023, Wolters was officially released from the Greek powerhouse.

On February 9, 2024, Wolters announced his retirement from professional basketball.

== Career statistics ==
Legend
GP	Games played	GS	Games started	MPG	Minutes per game
FG%	Field-goal percentage	3P%	3-point field-goal percentage	FT%	Free-throw percentage
RPG	Rebounds per game	APG	Assists per game	SPG	Steals per game
BPG	Blocks per game	PPG	Points per game	PIR	Performance index rating
**Bold**	Career high

=== NBA ===
==== Regular season ====
Year	Team	GP	GS	MPG	FG%	3P%	FT%	RPG	APG	SPG	BPG	PPG
2013–14	Milwaukee	**58**	**31**	**22.6**	**.437**	**.290**	**.656**	**2.6**	**3.2**	**.6**	**.3**	**7.2**
2014–15	Milwaukee	11	0	12.9	.387	.000	.250	1.5	.9	.5	.0	2.3
2014–15	New Orleans	10	0	10.6	.286	.000	.500	1.8	1.1	.3	.2	1.7
2017–18	Utah	5	0	3.8	.167	–	–	.4	.2	.0	.0	.4
Career		84	31	18.8	.423	.261	.635	2.2	2.5	.5	.2	5.5

=== EuroLeague ===
Year	Team	GP	GS	MPG	FG%	3P%	FT%	RPG	APG	SPG	BPG	PPG	PIR
2016–17	Crvena zvezda	27	1	15.1	.435	**.380**	**.781**	2.1	2.2	.7	.0	7.1	6.8
2018–19	Žalgiris	**28**	**19**	**22.9**	**.512**	.368	.694	**2.8**	**3.8**	**.8**	.0	**11.2**	**11.6**
Career		55	20	19.1	.481	.373	.735	2.5	3.0	.7	.0	9.2	9.3

=== College ===
Year	Team	GP	GS	MPG	FG%	3P%	FT%	RPG	APG	SPG	BPG	PPG
2009–10	South Dakota State	30	12	24.3	.388	.364	**.831**	3.4	2.8	1.1	**.2**	10.1
2010–11	South Dakota State	31	31	33.2	.447	**.404**	.796	4.6	**6.0**	1.3	**.2**	19.4
2011–12	South Dakota State	**34**	**34**	35.8	.448	.241	.783	5.1	5.9	**1.7**	.0	21.2
2012–13	South Dakota State	33	33	**38.1**	**.485**	.379	.813	**5.5**	5.8	**1.7**	.1	**22.2**
Career		128	110	33.0	.451	.342	.803	4.7	5.2	1.5	.1	18.4

Source: RealGM

== See also ==
- List of KK Crvena zvezda players with 100 games played
