= 2011–12 Oakland Golden Grizzlies men's basketball team =

American college basketball season

2011–12 Oakland Golden Grizzlies men's basketball

CIT, Semifinals
- Conference: The Summit League
- Record: 20–16 (11–7 Summit)
- Head coach: Greg Kampe (28th season)
- Assistant coaches: Jeff Tungate; Darren Sorenson; Saddi Washington
- Home arena: Athletics Center O'rena

2011–12 Summit League men's basketball standings
	Conf.				Overall
Team	W		L	PCT	W		L	PCT
Oral Roberts	17	–	1	.944	27	–	7	.794
South Dakota State †	15	–	3	.833	27	–	8	.771
Oakland	11	–	7	.611	20	–	16	.556
Western Illinois	9	–	9	.500	18	–	15	.545
North Dakota State	9	–	9	.500	17	–	14	.548
Southern Utah	8	–	10	.444	14	–	17	.452
IUPUI	7	–	11	.389	14	–	18	.438
South Dakota *	5	–	13	.278	10	–	18	.357
IPFW	5	–	13	.278	11	–	19	.367
UMKC	4	–	14	.222	10	–	21	.323
† 2012 Summit League tournament winner Rankings from AP Poll * Ineligible for conference tournament

The 2011–12 Oakland Golden Grizzlies men's basketball team represented Oakland University during the 2011–12 NCAA Division I men's basketball season. The Golden Grizzlies, led by 28th year head coach Greg Kampe, played their home games at the Athletics Center O'rena and are members of The Summit League. They finished the season 20–16, 11–7 in Summit League play to finish in third place. They lost in the quarterfinals of The Summit League Basketball tournament to Southern Utah. They were invited to the 2012 CollegeInsider.com Postseason Tournament where they defeated Bowling Green, Buffalo, and Rice en route to the semifinals before falling to Utah State.

== Roster ==
Number	Name	Position	Height	Weight	Year	Hometown
0	Duke Mondy	Guard	6–3	195	Junior	Grand Rapids, Michigan
2	Dante Williams	Forward	6–6	171	Freshman	Ann Arbor, Michigan
3	Travis Bader	Guard	6–5	179	Sophomore	Okemos, Michigan
4	Korab Imami	Center	6–10	200	Freshman	Peć, Kosovo
11	Jordan Howenstine	Guard	6–1	162	Junior	Lansing, Michigan
13	Laval Lucas-Perry	Guard	6–2	217	Senior	Flint, Michigan
15	Drew Valentine	Forward	6–5	219	Junior	Lansing, Michigan
22	Blake Cushingberry	Guard	6–3	261	Junior	Romeo, Michigan
23	Reggie Hamilton	Guard	5–11	176	Senior	Chicago, Illinois
24	Matt Poches	Guard	6–4	192	Freshman	Hartland, Michigan
33	Ryan Bass	Guard	5–10	167	Sophomore	Dayton, Ohio
40	Kyle Sikora	Center	7–0	243	Freshman	Key Largo, Florida
42	Corey Petros	Center/Forward	6–10	235	Freshman	Sterling Heights, Michigan
52	Joey Asbury	Forward	6–7	208	Sophomore	Warren, Michigan

== Schedule ==
Date time, TV	Rank^{#}	Opponent^{#}	Result	Record	Site (attendance) city, state
Exhibition
November 2, 2011*; 7:00 pm		Spring Arbor	W 94–55	—	Athletics Center O'rena (1,155); Rochester, MI
November 8, 2011*; 7:00 pm		Windsor	W 98–67	—	Rochester Adams High School (405); Rochester Hills, MI
Regular season
November 14, 2011*; 8:00 pm		at No. 16 Alabama	L 57–74	0–1	Coleman Coliseum (9,876); Tuscaloosa, AL
November 16, 2011*; 8:00 pm		at Arkansas; Southwest Classic	L 68–91	0–2	Bud Walton Arena (11,618); Fayetteville, AR
November 19, 2011*; 4:00 pm		at Grambling State; Southwest Classic	W 75–45	1–2	Fredrick C. Hobdy Assembly Center (371); Grambling, LA
November 22, 2011*; 8:15 pm		at Houston; Southwest Classic	W 76–74	2–2	Hofheinz Pavilion (3,287); Houston, TX
November 25, 2011*; 7:00 pm		Utah Valley; Southwest Classic	W 89–83	3–2	Athletics Center O'rena (2,035); Rochester, MI
November 28, 2011*; 9:00 pm, ESPNU		Tennessee	W 89–81	4–2	Athletics Center O'rena (3,755); Rochester, MI
December 1, 2011; 7:00 pm		South Dakota	W 101–83	5–2 (1–0)	Athletics Center O'rena (2,015); Rochester, MI
December 3, 2011; 6:00 pm		UMKC	W 86–73	6–2 (2–0)	Athletics Center O'rena (2,285); Rochester, MI
December 7, 2011*; 7:00 pm		Ohio	L 82–84	6–3	Athletics Center O'rena (2,175); Rochester, MI
December 10, 2011*; 4:00 pm, FS Detroit		vs. No. 20 Michigan	L 80–90	6–4	The Palace (17,118); Auburn Hills, MI
December 13, 2011*; 7:00 pm		Rochester	W 77–62	7–4	Athletics Center O'rena (2,015); Rochester, MI
December 17, 2011*; 8:00 pm		at Valparaiso	W 82–80	8–4	The ARC (2,884); Valparaiso, IN
December 20, 2011*; 8:00 pm, FS Detroit		at Arizona	L 73–85	8–5	McKale Center (13,735); Tucson, AZ
December 23, 2011*; 7:00 pm		Western Michigan	L 65–72	8–6	Athletics Center O'rena (3,415); Rochester, MI
December 28, 2011; 8:00 pm		at North Dakota State	L 69–96	8–7 (2–1)	Bison Sports Arena (3,544); Fargo, ND
December 30, 2011; 8:00 pm		at South Dakota State	L 64–76	8–8 (2–2)	Frost Arena (3,803); Brookings, SD
January 1, 2012; 7:00 pm		Oral Roberts	L 80–89	8–9 (2–3)	Athletics Center O'rena (2,185); Rochester, MI
January 5, 2012; 7:00 pm		Western Illinois	L 61–71	8–10 (2–4)	Athletics Center O'rena (2,115); Rochester, MI
January 7, 2012; 6:00 pm		IUPUI	W 93–81	9–10 (3–4)	Athletics Center O'rena (2,617); Rochester, MI
January 14, 2012; 7:00 pm		at IPFW	W 81–71	10–10 (4–4)	Allen County War Memorial Coliseum (2,701); Fort Wayne, IN
January 19, 2012; 7:00 pm		at Southern Utah	W 72–63	11–10 (5–4)	Centrum Arena (2,579); Cedar City, UT
January 21, 2012; 8:00 pm, FCS		at Oral Roberts	L 86–93	11–11 (5–5)	Mabee Center (9,005); Tulsa, OK
January 26, 2012; 7:00 pm, FS Detroit		South Dakota State	W 92–87	12–11 (6–5)	Athletics Center O'rena (2,935); Rochester, MI
January 28, 2012; 6:00 pm		North Dakota State; Homecoming	L 75–78	12–12 (6–6)	Athletics Center O'rena (3,935); Rochester, MI
February 1, 2012; 7:00 pm		at IUPUI	L 60–75	12–13 (6–7)	The Jungle (978); Indianapolis, IN
February 4, 2012; 8:00 pm		at Western Illinois	W 74–70 ^{2OT}	13–13 (7–7)	Western Hall (2,124); Macomb, IL
February 11, 2012; 12:00 pm, FS Detroit		IPFW	W 93–82	14–13 (8–7)	Athletics Center O'rena (2,925); Rochester, MI
February 15, 2012; 7:00 pm		Southern Utah	W 76–68 ^{OT}	15–13 (9–7)	Athletics Center O'rena (3,223); Rochester, MI
February 18, 2012*; 5:00 pm		at Illinois State; ESPN BracketBusters	L 75–79	15–14	Redbird Arena (4,601); Normal, IL
February 23, 2012; 8:00 pm		at UMKC	W 73–71	16–14 (10–7)	Swinney Recreation Center (1,112); Kansas City, MO
February 25, 2012; 8:30 pm, Midco Sports Network		at South Dakota	W 73–71	17–14 (11–7)	DakotaDome (2,738); Vermillion, SD
Summit League tournament
March 4, 2012; 9:30 pm, FS Detroit	(3)	vs. (6) Southern Utah; Quarterfinals	L 82–84	17–15	Sioux Falls Arena (2,835); Sioux Falls, SD
CollegeInsider.com tournament
March 14, 2012*; 7:00 pm		Bowling Green; First Round	W 86–69	18–15	Athletics Center O'rena (2,015); Rochester, MI
March 17, 2012*; 2:00 pm		Buffalo; Second Round	W 84–76	19–15	Athletics Center O'rena (1,685); Rochester, MI
March 20, 2012*; 7:00 pm		Rice; Quarterfinals	W 77–70	20–15	Athletics Center O'rena (1,775); Rochester, MI
March 25, 2012*; 6:00 pm		at Utah State; Semifinals	L 81–105	20–16	Smith Spectrum (2,092); Logan, UT
*Non-conference game. ^{#}Rankings from AP Poll. (#) Tournament seedings in parentheses. All times are in Eastern Time.
