= 2011–12 Oral Roberts Golden Eagles men's basketball team =

American college basketball season

2011–12 Oral Roberts Golden Eagles men's basketball

The Summit League Regular Season champions

NIT, First round
- Conference: The Summit League
- Record: 27–7 (17–1 The Summit)
- Head coach: Scott Sutton (13th season)
- Assistant coaches: Tom Hankins; Conley Phipps; Sean Sutton
- Home arena: Mabee Center

2011–12 Summit League men's basketball standings
	Conf.				Overall
Team	W		L	PCT	W		L	PCT
Oral Roberts	17	–	1	.944	27	–	7	.794
South Dakota State †	15	–	3	.833	27	–	8	.771
Oakland	11	–	7	.611	20	–	16	.556
Western Illinois	9	–	9	.500	18	–	15	.545
North Dakota State	9	–	9	.500	17	–	14	.548
Southern Utah	8	–	10	.444	14	–	17	.452
IUPUI	7	–	11	.389	14	–	18	.438
South Dakota *	5	–	13	.278	10	–	18	.357
IPFW	5	–	13	.278	11	–	19	.367
UMKC	4	–	14	.222	10	–	21	.323
† 2012 Summit League tournament winner Rankings from AP Poll * Ineligible for conference tournament

The 2011–12 Oral Roberts Golden Eagles men's basketball team represented Oral Roberts University during the 2011–12 NCAA Division I men's basketball season. The Golden Eagles, led by 13th year head coach Scott Sutton, played their home games at the Mabee Center and are members of The Summit League. This was their last season as a member of The Summit League before joining the Southland Conference in 2012–13 (they rejoined the Summit League in 2014–15). They finished the season 27–7, 17–1 in Summit League play to be crowned regular season champions. They lost in the semifinals of The Summit League Basketball tournament to Western Illinois. As regular season conference champions, they received an automatic bid into the 2012 National Invitation Tournament where they lost in the first round to Nevada.

== Roster ==
Number	Name	Position	Height	Weight	Year	Hometown
2	D.J. Jackson	Guard	5–11	175	Freshman	Kansas City, Missouri
3	Robert Aery	Guard	6–0	185	Senior	Tulsa, Oklahoma
4	Roderick Pearson, Jr.	Guard	6–2	195	Senior	Kansas City, Missouri
10	Tyrone Nance	Forward	6–5	211	Junior	Los Angeles, CA
11	Shawn Glover	Guard/Forward	6–7	195	Junior	Dallas, TX
12	Ken Holdman	Guard	6–0	180	Senior	Tulsa, Oklahoma
13	Warren Niles	Guard	6–5	195	Junior	Cincinnati, Ohio
14	Jake Lliteras	Guard	6–5	195	Freshman	Hillsborough, North Carolina
21	Kris Obaseki	Forward	6–9	180	Freshman	Houston, TX
22	Steven Roundtree	Forward	6–8	190	Sophomore	Jacksonville, Florida
23	P.J. Purnell	Guard	6–2	175	Freshman	Silver Spring, Maryland
25	Trey Cox	Guard	6–1	190	Freshman	Kansas City, Missouri
32	Damen Bell-Holter	Forward/Center	6–9	245	Junior	Hydaburg, Alaska
35	Mikey Manghum	Guard	6–2	185	Junior	Derby, England
45	Dominique Morrison	Forward	6–6	210	Senior	Kansas City, Missouri
54	Michael Craion	Forward	6–5	215	Senior	Kansas City, Missouri

== Schedule ==
Date time, TV	Rank^{#}	Opponent^{#}	Result	Record	Site (attendance) city, state
Exhibition
11/01/2011*; 7:00 pm		Rogers State	W 78–45	—	Mabee Center; Tulsa, OK
11/06/2011*; 3:00 pm		Northeastern State	W 65–59	—	Mabee Center; Tulsa, OK
Regular season
11/11/2011*; 8:00 pm, ESPN3		at West Virginia	L 71–78	0–1	WVU Coliseum (8,579); Morgantown, WV
11/15/2011*; 9:30 pm		vs. UTSA; NIT Season Tip-Off	L 77–78	0–2	Gallagher-Iba Arena (3,719); Stillwater, OK
11/16/2011*; 9:30 pm		vs. Arkansas–Pine Bluff; NIT Season Tip-Off	W 80–44	1–2	Gallagher-Iba Arena (3,836); Stillwater, OK
11/19/2011*; 7:00 pm		Austin Peay	W 71–59	2–2	Mabee Center (2,852); Tulsa, OK
11/21/2011*; 7:30 pm		SMU; NIT Season Tip-Off	W 62–56	3–2	Mabee Center (1,971); Tulsa, OK
11/22/2011*; 7:30 pm		FIU; NIT Season Tip-Off	W 73–65	4–2	Mabee Center (2,218); Tulsa, OK
11/30/2011*; 7:00 pm, FCS		Missouri State	W 68–63	5–2	Mabee Center (3,352); Tulsa, OK
12/03/2011; 7:00 pm		Southern Utah	W 61–55	6–2 (1–0)	Mabee Center (2,263); Tulsa, OK
12/08/2011*; 7:00 pm, ESPN3		at Oklahoma	L 59–73	6–3	Lloyd Noble Center (7,699); Norman, OK
12/12/2011*; 7:00 pm		at Arkansas–Little Rock	W 58–55	7–3	Jack Stephens Center (2,557); Little Rock, AR
12/15/2011*; 8:00 pm		at Gonzaga	L 61–67	7–4	McCarthey Athletic Center (6,000); Spokane, WA
12/18/2011*; 12:00 pm, FS Ohio		at No. 8 Xavier	W 64–42	8–4	Cintas Center (9,678); Cincinnati, OH
12/22/2011*; 7:00 pm, FCS		Texas Tech	W 72–56	9–4	Mabee Center (8,064); Tulsa, OK
12/28/2011; 7:00 pm		at UMKC	W 72–65	10–4 (2–0)	Swinney Recreation Center (1,504); Kansas City, MO
12/30/2011; 7:00 pm		at South Dakota	W 79–67	11–4 (3–0)	DakotaDome (1,689); Vermillion, SD
01/03/2012; 6:00 pm		at Oakland	W 89–80	12–4 (4–0)	Athletics Center O'rena (2,185); Rochester, MI
01/05/2012; 7:00 pm, FCS		North Dakota State	W 89–80	13–4 (5–0)	Mabee Center (2,524); Tulsa, OK
01/07/2012; 7:00 pm, FCS		South Dakota State	W 97–75	14–4 (6–0)	Mabee Center (3,725); Tulsa, OK
01/12/2012; 7:00 pm		at Western Illinois	W 71–70 ^{2OT}	15–4 (7–0)	Western Hall (1,029); Macomb, IL
01/14/2012; 6:00 pm		at IUPUI	W 81–71	16–4 (8–0)	IUPUI Gymnasium (1,215); Indianapolis, IN
01/19/2012; 7:00 pm, FCS		IPFW	W 65–54	17–4 (9–0)	Mabee Center (3,583); Tulsa, OK
01/21/2012; 7:00 pm, FCS		Oakland	W 93–86	18–4 (10–0)	Mabee Center (9,005); Tulsa, OK
01/26/2012; 7:00 pm, FCS		South Dakota	W 97–64	19–4 (11–0)	Mabee Center (3,170); Tulsa, OK
01/28/2012; 7:00 pm, FCS		UMKC	W 77–67	20–4 (12–0)	Mabee Center (6,850); Tulsa, OK
02/02/2012; 7:00 pm		at South Dakota State	L 60–75	20–5 (12–1)	Frost Arena (4,255); Brookings, SD
02/04/2012; 7:30 pm		at North Dakota State	W 85–76	21–5 (13–1)	Bison Sports Arena (4,464); Fargo, ND
02/09/2012; 7:00 pm, FCS		IUPUI	W 76–74 ^{OT}	22–5 (14–1)	Mabee Center (3,495); Tulsa, OK
02/11/2012; 7:00 pm, FCS		Western Illinois; Homecoming	W 61–51	23–5 (15–1)	Mabee Center (8,617); Tulsa, OK
02/15/2012; 6:00 pm		at IPFW	W 75–71	24–5 (16–1)	Allen County War Memorial Coliseum (1,679); Ft. Wayne, IN
02/18/2012*; 1:00 pm, ESPN2		Akron; ESPN BracketBusters	W 67–61	25–5	Mabee Center (7,745); Tulsa, OK
02/25/2012; 8:30 pm		at Southern Utah	W 73–71	26–5 (17–1)	Centrum Arena (2,738); Cedar City, UT
Summit League tournament
03/03/2012; 6:00 pm, FCS	(1)	vs. (8) IPFW; Quarterfinals	W 71–67	27–5	Sioux Falls Arena (6,614); Sioux Falls, SD
03/05/2012; 6:00 pm, FCS	(1)	vs. (4) Western Illinois; Semifinals	L 53–54	27–6	Sioux Falls Arena (6,448); Sioux Falls, SD
NIT
03/14/2012*; 8:15 pm, ESPN3	(4)	(5) Nevada; First round	L 59–68	27–7	Mabee Center (2,474); Tulsa, OK
*Non-conference game. ^{#}Rankings from AP Poll. (#) Tournament seedings in parentheses. All times are in Central Time.
