= 2012 Summit League men's basketball tournament =

American basketball tournament

- Classification: Division I
- Season: 2011–12
- Teams: 8
- Site: Sioux Falls Arena; Sioux Falls, South Dakota
- Champions: South Dakota State (1st title)
- Winning coach: Scott Nagy (1st title)
- MVP: Nate Wolters (South Dakota State)
- Television: ESPN2, FCS, Midco Sport Network

2011–12 Summit League men's basketball standings
	Conf.				Overall
Team	W		L	PCT	W		L	PCT
Oral Roberts	17	–	1	.944	27	–	7	.794
South Dakota State †	15	–	3	.833	27	–	8	.771
Oakland	11	–	7	.611	20	–	16	.556
Western Illinois	9	–	9	.500	18	–	15	.545
North Dakota State	9	–	9	.500	17	–	14	.548
Southern Utah	8	–	10	.444	14	–	17	.452
IUPUI	7	–	11	.389	14	–	18	.438
South Dakota *	5	–	13	.278	10	–	18	.357
IPFW	5	–	13	.278	11	–	19	.367
UMKC	4	–	14	.222	10	–	21	.323
† 2012 Summit League tournament winner Rankings from AP Poll * Ineligible for conference tournament

The 2012 Summit League men's basketball tournament was the 2012 post-season tournament for The Summit League, an NCAA Division I athletic conference. The tournament took place March 3–6, 2012, at the Sioux Falls Arena in Sioux Falls, South Dakota. South Dakota State won and received an automatic bid to the 2012 NCAA tournament.

This was the final Summit League tournament for Southern Utah, which joined the Big Sky Conference for the 2012–13 basketball season. Meanwhile, Oral Roberts joined the Southland Conference in 2012–13 but returned to the Summit in 2014–15.

== Format ==
Out of the league's 10 teams, the top eight in the standings qualified for the conference tournament. Teams were seeded by conference record, with the following tiebreakers used if necessary:

1. Head-to-head competition
2. Comparison of each tied team's record against the team occupying the highest position in the standings continuing down through the standings until a team gains an advantage.
3. When arriving at another group of tied teams while comparing records, use each team's record against the collective tied teams as a group (prior to that group's own tie-breaking procedure) rather than the performance against individual tied teams.
4. If a tie still cannot be broken after applying criteria (1), (2) and (3), it will be broken by comparing each tied team's RPI (based upon the RPIRankings.com Report issued on the morning following the last regular season league game).

The following criteria were applied to break ties between more than two teams:

1. Head-to-head
2. Each tied team's record shall be compared to the team or group (if two or more are tied) occupying the highest position in the standings continuing down through the standings until a team gains an advantage.

== Bracket ==
Quarterfinals; March 3–4; Midco Sport Network/FCS
1	Oral Roberts	71
8	IPFW	67
4	Western Illinois	58
5	North Dakota State	53
2	South Dakota State	77
7	IUPUI	56
3	Oakland	82
6	Southern Utah	84

Semifinals; March 5 Midco Sport Network/FCS
1	Oral Roberts	53
4	Western Illinois	54
2	South Dakota State	63
6	Southern Utah	47

Final; March 6 ESPN2
2	South Dakota State	52
4	Western Illinois	50 ^{OT}
