= 2009 NCAA Men's Basketball All-Americans =

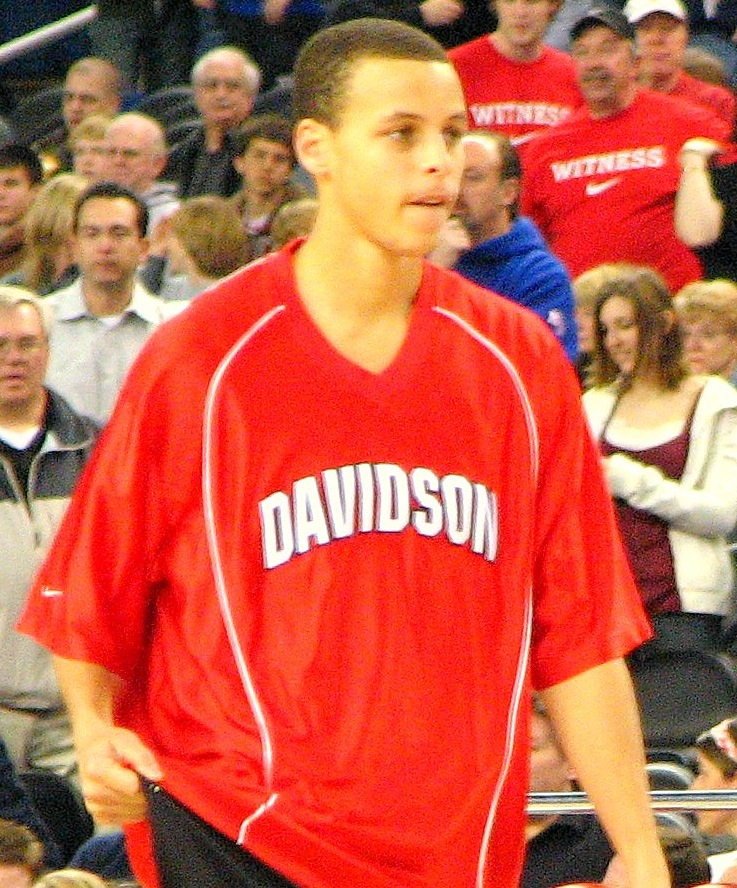
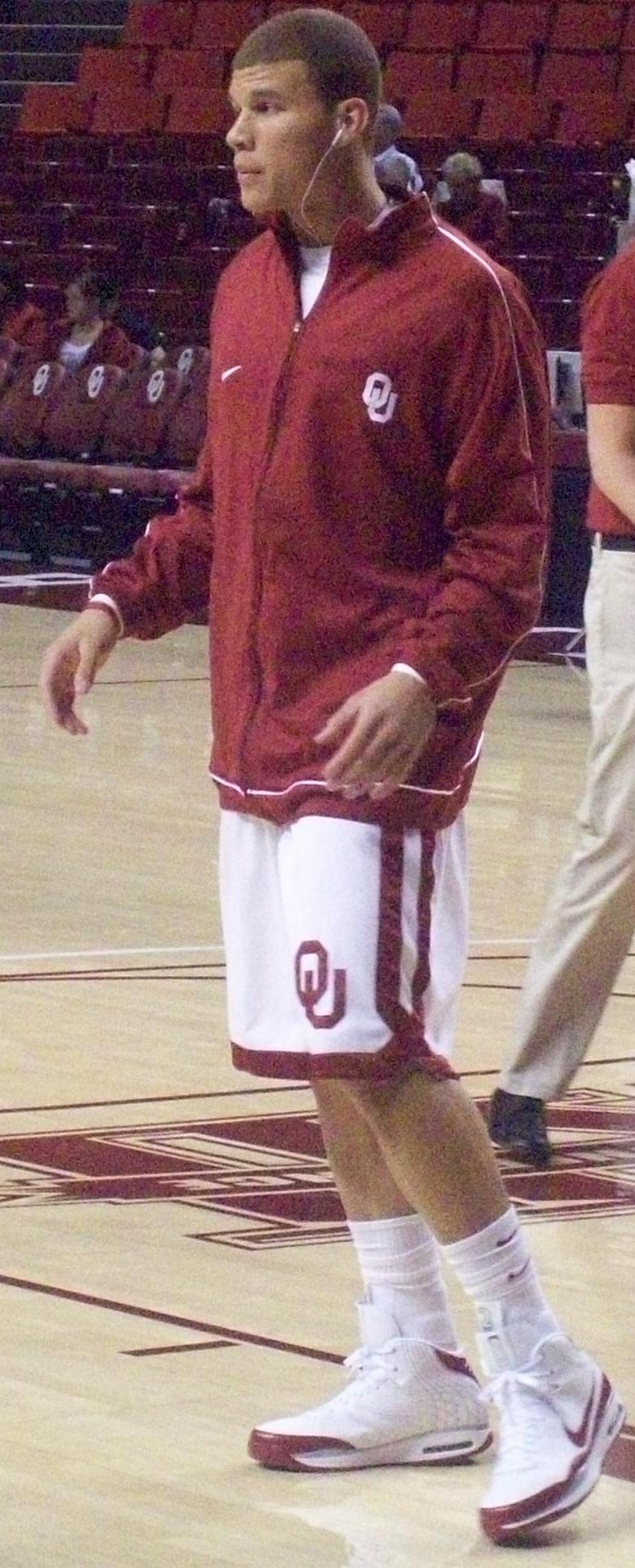
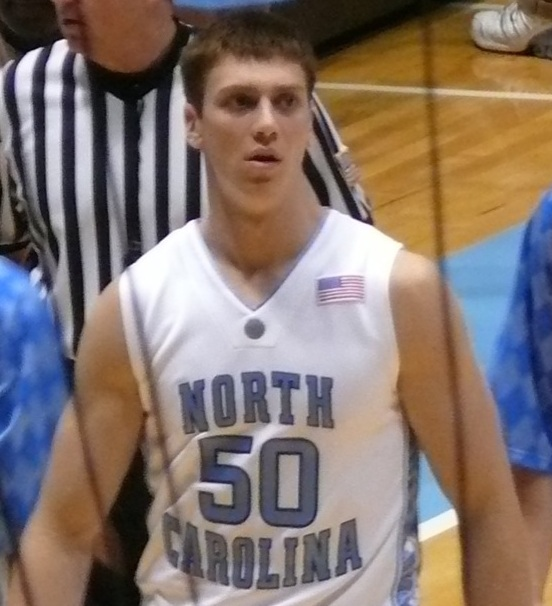
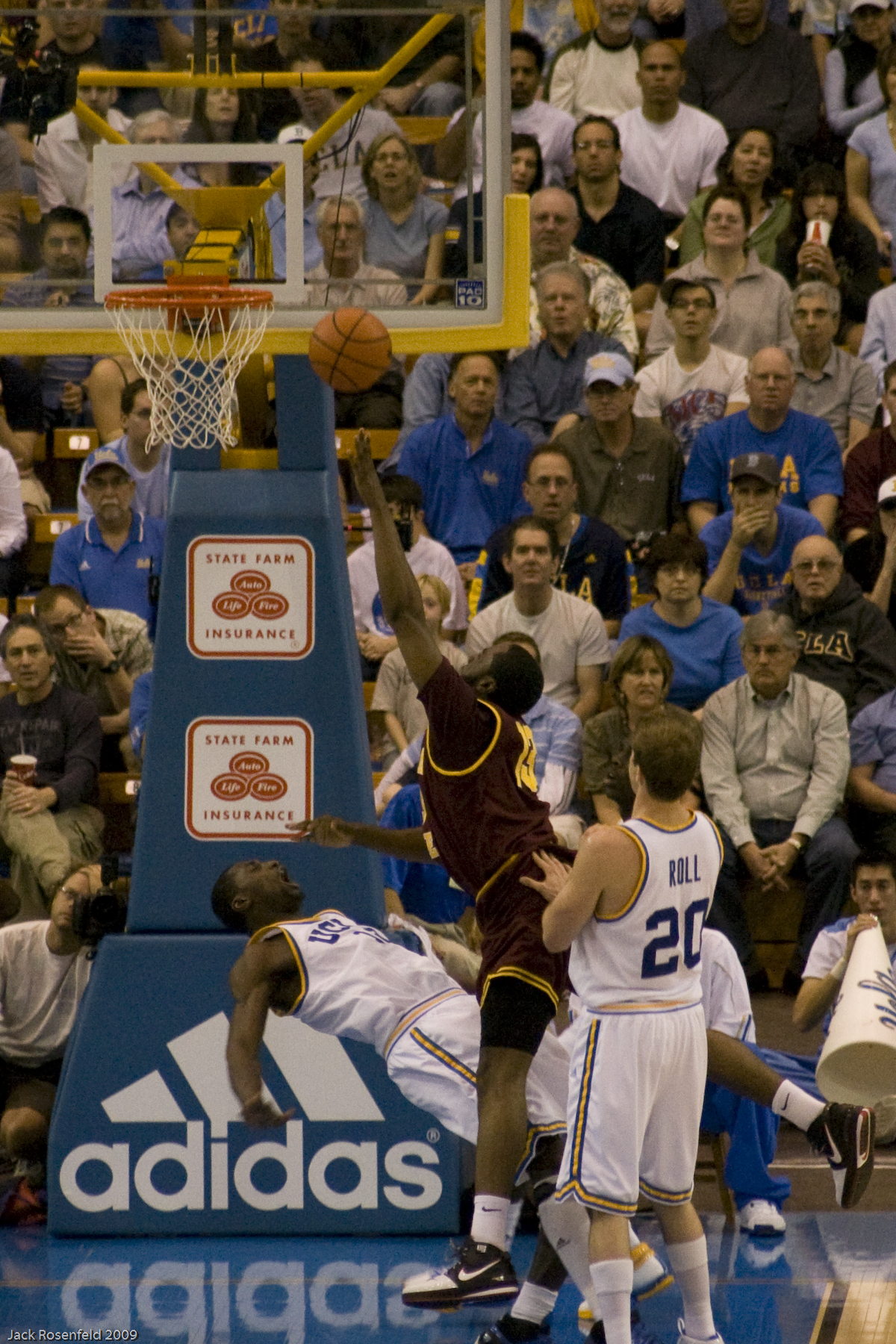
- Members of the 2009 Consensus All-America first team. Clockwise from upper left: Curry, Griffin, Harden, Hansbrough (not pictured: Blair).
- Awarded for: 2008–09 NCAA Division I men's basketball season

An All-American team is an honorary sports team composed of the best amateur players of a specific season for each team position—who in turn are given the honorific "All-America" and typically referred to as "All-American athletes", or simply "All-Americans". Although the honorees generally do not compete together as a unit, the term is used in U.S. team sports to refer to players who are selected by members of the national media. Caspar Whitney selected the first All-America team in the early days of American football in 1889. The 2009 NCAA Men's Basketball All-Americans are honorary lists that includes All-American selections from the Associated Press (AP), the United States Basketball Writers Association (USBWA), the Sporting News (TSN), and the National Association of Basketball Coaches (NABC) drawn from the 2008–09 NCAA Division I men's basketball season. All selectors choose at least a first and second 5-man team. The NABC, AP and TSN choose third teams, while AP also lists honorable mention selections.

The Consensus 2009 College Basketball All-American team is determined by aggregating the results of the four major All-American teams as determined by the National Collegiate Athletic Association (NCAA). Since United Press International was replaced by TSN in 1997, the four major selectors have been the aforementioned ones. AP has been a selector since 1948, NABC since 1957 and USBWA since 1960. To earn "consensus" status, a player must win honors based on a point system computed from the four different all-America teams. The point system consists of three points for first team, two points for second team and one point for third team. No honorable mention or fourth team or lower are used in the computation. The top five totals plus ties are first team and the next five plus ties are second team. According to this system, DeJuan Blair, Stephen Curry, Blake Griffin, Tyler Hansbrough and James Harden were first team selections and Sherron Collins, Luke Harangody, Ty Lawson, Jodie Meeks, Jeff Teague and Hasheem Thabeet were second team selections.

Although the aforementioned lists are used to determine consensus honors, there are numerous other All-American lists. The ten finalists for the John Wooden Award are described as Wooden All-Americans. The ten finalists for the Lowe's Senior CLASS Award are described as Senior All-Americans. Other All-American lists include those determined by Fox Sports, and Yahoo! Sports. The scholar-athletes selected by College Sports Information Directors of America (CoSIDA) are termed Academic All-Americans.

== 2009 Consensus All-America team ==
PG – Point guard
SG – Shooting guard
PF – Power forward
SF – Small forward
C – Center

The following players were consensus All-Americans.

Consensus First Team
Player	Position	Class	Team
DeJuan Blair	C	Sophomore	Pittsburgh
Stephen Curry	PG	Junior	Davidson
Blake Griffin	PF	Sophomore	Oklahoma
Tyler Hansbrough	C	Senior	North Carolina
James Harden	SG	Sophomore	Arizona State

Consensus Second Team
Player	Position	Class	Team
Sherron Collins	PG	Junior	Kansas
Luke Harangody	PF	Junior	Notre Dame
Ty Lawson	PG	Junior	North Carolina
Jodie Meeks	SG	Junior	Kentucky
Jeff Teague	PG	Sophomore	Wake Forest
Hasheem Thabeet	C	Junior	Connecticut

== Individual All-America teams ==
The table below details the selections for four major 2009 college basketball All-American teams. The number corresponding to the team designation (i.e., whether a player was a first team, second team, etc. selection) appears in the table. The following columns are included in the table:

Player – The name of the All-American
School – Collegiate affiliation
AP – Associated Press All-American Team
USBWA – United States Basketball Writers Association All-American Team
NABC – National Association of Basketball Coaches All-American Team
TSN – Sporting News All-American Team
CP – Points in the consensus scoring system

=== By player ===
Player	School	AP	USBWA	NABC	TSN	CP	Notes
Stephen Curry	Davidson	1	1	1	1	12	NCAA scoring leader
Blake Griffin	Oklahoma	1	1	1	1	12	National Player of the Year (AP, Athlon, FOX, NABC, Naismith, Rupp, TSN, SI, USBWA-Robertson, Wooden), NBA First overall draft, NCAA rebounding leader
Tyler Hansbrough	North Carolina	1	1	1	1	12	College Basketball Athlete of the Decade (Sporting News, Sports Illustrated), Lowe's Senior CLASS Award
James Harden	Arizona State	1	1	1	1	12	—
DeJuan Blair	Pittsburgh	1	1	2	1	11	—
Hasheem Thabeet	Connecticut	2	2	1	2	9	NABC Defensive Player of the Year
Jodie Meeks	Kentucky	2	2	2	2	8	—
Sherron Collins	Kansas	3	2	2	3	6	—
Luke Harangody	Notre Dame	2	2	3	3	6	—
Ty Lawson	North Carolina	2	—	2	2	6	Bob Cousy Award
Jeff Teague	Wake Forest	—	2	2	2	6	—
Jerel McNeal	Marquette	2	—	3	2	5	—
Toney Douglas	Florida State	3	—	—	3	2	—
Gerald Henderson Jr.	Duke	3	—	3	—	2	—
Terrence Williams	Louisville	3	—	3	—	2	—
Sam Young	Pittsburgh	3	—	—	3	2	—
Darren Collison	UCLA	—	—	3	—	1	Frances Pomeroy Naismith Award
Jordan Hill	Arizona	—	—	—	3	1	—

=== By team ===
All-America Team
All-America Team	First team		Second team		Third team	
All-America Team	Player	School	Player	School	Player	School
Associated Press	DeJuan Blair	Pittsburgh	Luke Harangody	Notre Dame	Sherron Collins	Kansas
Associated Press	Stephen Curry	Davidson	Ty Lawson	North Carolina	Toney Douglas	Florida State
Associated Press	Blake Griffin	Oklahoma	Jerel McNeal	Marquette	Gerald Henderson	Duke
Associated Press	Tyler Hansbrough	North Carolina	Jodie Meeks	Kentucky	Terrence Williams	Louisville
Associated Press	James Harden	Arizona State	Hasheem Thabeet	Connecticut	Sam Young	Pittsburgh
USBWA	DeJuan Blair	Pittsburgh	Sherron Collins	Kansas	No third team	
USBWA	Stephen Curry	Davidson	Luke Harangody	Notre Dame	No third team	
USBWA	Blake Griffin	Oklahoma	Jodie Meeks	Kentucky	No third team	
USBWA	Tyler Hansbrough	North Carolina	Jeff Teague	Wake Forest	No third team	
USBWA	James Harden	Arizona State	Hasheem Thabeet	Connecticut	No third team	
NABC	Stephen Curry	Davidson	DeJuan Blair	Pittsburgh	Darren Collison	UCLA
NABC	Blake Griffin	Oklahoma	Sherron Collins	Kansas	Luke Harangody	Notre Dame
NABC	Tyler Hansbrough	North Carolina	Ty Lawson	North Carolina	Gerald Henderson	Duke
NABC	James Harden	Arizona State	Jodie Meeks	Kentucky	Jerel McNeal	Marquette
NABC	Hasheem Thabeet	Connecticut	Jeff Teague	Wake Forest	Terrence Williams	Louisville
Sporting News	DeJuan Blair	Pittsburgh	Ty Lawson	North Carolina	Sherron Collins	Kansas
Sporting News	Stephen Curry	Davidson	Jodie Meeks	Kentucky	Toney Douglas	Florida State
Sporting News	Blake Griffin	Oklahoma	Jerel McNeal	Marquette	Luke Harangody	Notre Dame
Sporting News	Tyler Hansbrough	North Carolina	Jeff Teague	Wake Forest	Jordan Hill	Arizona
Sporting News	James Harden	Arizona State	Hasheem Thabeet	Connecticut	Sam Young	Pittsburgh

AP Honorable Mention:

- Jeff Adrien, Connecticut
- Josh Akognon, Cal State Fullerton
- Cole Aldrich, Kansas
- Alex Barnett, Dartmouth
- Marqus Blakely, Vermont
- Craig Brackins, Iowa State
- Michael Bramos, Miami (OH)
- Jon Brockman, Washington
- Brandon Brooks, Alabama State
- John Bryant, Santa Clara
- Chase Budinger, Arizona
- DeMarre Carroll, Missouri
- Jeremy Chappell, Robert Morris
- Dionte Christmas, Temple
- Earl Clark, Louisville
- Darren Collison, UCLA
- Dante Cunningham, Villanova
- Devan Downey, South Carolina
- Tyreke Evans, Memphis
- Levance Fields, Pittsburgh
- Jonny Flynn, Syracuse
- Kenny Hasbrouck, Siena
- Jordan Hill, Arizona
- Matt Howard, Butler
- Lester Hudson, Tennessee-Martin
- Matt Kingsley, Stephen F. Austin
- Kalin Lucas, Michigan State
- Eric Maynor, VCU
- Kellen McCoy, Weber State
- Tywain McKee, Coppin State
- Orlando Mendez-Valdez, Western Kentucky
- Derrick Mercer, American
- Luke Nevill, Utah
- Ahmad Nivins, Saint Joseph's
- Artsiom Parakhouski, Radford
- A. J. Price, Connecticut
- Alex Renfroe, Belmont
- Tyrese Rice, Boston College
- Kyle Singler, Duke
- Jermaine Taylor, Central Florida
- Jeff Teague, Wake Forest
- Marcus Thornton, LSU
- Evan Turner, Ohio State
- Jarvis Varnado, Mississippi State
- Gary Wilkinson, Utah State
- Booker Woodfox, Creighton
- Ben Woodside, North Dakota State

== Academic All-Americans ==
On February 25, 2009, CoSIDA and ESPN The Magazine announced the 2009 Academic All-American team with Brett Winkelman headlining the University Division as the men's college basketball Academic All-American of the Year.

2008–09 ESPN The Magazine Academic All-America Men's Basketball Team (University Division) as selected by CoSIDA:

First Team
Player	School	Class	GPA/Major
Brett Winkelman	North Dakota State	Senior	3.88/ Industrial engineering & Management
Jason Holsinger	Evansville	Senior	3.89/ Economics
Aaron Linn	Gardner-Webb	Senior	4.00/ Finance
Bryan Mullins	Southern Illinois	Senior	4.00/ Finance
Alex Ruoff	West Virginia	Senior	3.79/ History

Second Team
Player	School	Class	GPA/Major
Jimmy Baron	Rhode Island	Senior	3.42/ Communications
Matt Howard	Butler	Sophomore	3.72/ Finance
Yves Mekongo Mbala	La Salle	Junior	3.82/ International Science, Business & Technology
Michael Schachtner	Wisconsin-Green Bay	Senior	3.81/ Psychology
Ryan Schneider	Marist	Senior	3.72/ Communications/Sports Communication

Third Team
Player	School	Class	GPA/Major
Patrick Foley	Columbia	Junior	3.81/ Political science
David Kool	Western Michigan	Junior	3.38/ Physical education
Kevin Lisch	Saint Louis	Graduate	3.48/ Business administration (MBA)
Greg Paulus	Duke	Senior	3.35/ Political Science
Andy Wicke	Belmont	Senior	3.74/ Environmental studies

== Wooden All-Americans ==
The ten finalists (and ties) for the John R. Wooden Award are called Wooden All-Americans. The 11 honorees are as follows:

Player	School
DeJuan Blair	Pittsburgh
Stephen Curry	Davidson
Blake Griffin	Oklahoma
Tyler Hansbrough	North Carolina
Luke Harangody	Notre Dame
James Harden	Arizona State
Gerald Henderson, Jr.	Duke
Ty Lawson	North Carolina
Hasheem Thabeet	Connecticut
Terrence Williams	Louisville
Sam Young	Pittsburgh

== Senior All-Americans ==
The ten finalists for the Lowe's Senior CLASS Award are called Senior All-Americans. The 10 honorees are as follows:

Player	School
A.J. Abrams	Texas
Jimmy Baron	Rhode Island
Dionte Christmas	Temple
Tyler Hansbrough	North Carolina
Lester Hudson	Tennessee-Martin
Curtis Jerrells	Baylor
Jerel McNeal	Marquette
Andy Wicke	Belmont
Terrence Williams	Louisville
Sam Young	Pittsburgh
