= 2011–12 Western Illinois Leathernecks men's basketball team =

American college basketball season

2011–12 Western Illinois Leathernecks men's basketball

CBI, First round
- Conference: Summit League
- Record: 18–15 (9–9 Summit)
- Head coach: Jim Molinari (4th season)
- Assistant coaches: Billy Wright; Wade Hokenson; Kyle Vogt
- Home arena: Western Hall

2011–12 Summit League men's basketball standings
	Conf.				Overall
Team	W		L	PCT	W		L	PCT
Oral Roberts	17	–	1	.944	27	–	7	.794
South Dakota State †	15	–	3	.833	27	–	8	.771
Oakland	11	–	7	.611	20	–	16	.556
Western Illinois	9	–	9	.500	18	–	15	.545
North Dakota State	9	–	9	.500	17	–	14	.548
Southern Utah	8	–	10	.444	14	–	17	.452
IUPUI	7	–	11	.389	14	–	18	.438
South Dakota *	5	–	13	.278	10	–	18	.357
IPFW	5	–	13	.278	11	–	19	.367
UMKC	4	–	14	.222	10	–	21	.323
† 2012 Summit League tournament winner Rankings from AP Poll * Ineligible for conference tournament

The 2011–12 Western Illinois Leathernecks men's basketball team represented Western Illinois University in the 2011–12 NCAA Division I men's basketball season. The Leathernecks, led by head coach Jim Molinari, played their home games at Western Hall in Macomb, Illinois, as members of the Summit League. After finishing 4th in the Summit during the regular season, the Leathernecks made a run to the championship game of the Summit League tournament, where they were defeated by South Dakota State.

Western Illinois failed to qualify for the NCAA tournament, but received a bid to the 2012 College Basketball Invitational, the first postseason bid in program history since moving to Division I for the 1981–82 season. The Leathernecks were eliminated in the first round of the CBI by Oregon State, 80–59.

== Roster ==
2011–12 Western Illinois Leathernecks men's basketball team
Players
Coaches

Pos.	#	Name	Height	Weight	Year	Hometown
G	3	Tommie Tyler	6 ft 3 in (1.91 m)	190 lb (86 kg)	Sr	Houston, Texas
G	12	Jalen Packer	6 ft 2 in (1.88 m)	175 lb (79 kg)	Fr	Princeton, Indiana
G	14	Billy Molinari	6 ft 2 in (1.88 m)	190 lb (86 kg)	So	Peoria, Illinois
F	15	Obi Emegano	6 ft 3 in (1.91 m)	215 lb (98 kg)	Fr	Edmond, Oklahoma
G	22	Ceola Clark III	6 ft 3 in (1.91 m)	190 lb (86 kg)	Sr	Gurnee, Illinois
G	24	Remy Roberts–Burnett	6 ft 0 in (1.83 m)	180 lb (82 kg)	Fr	Joliet, Illinois
G	30	Antwan Watson	6 ft 1 in (1.85 m)	170 lb (77 kg)	Sr	Chicago, Illinois
F	32	Jack Houpt	6 ft 7 in (2.01 m)	210 lb (95 kg)	Jr	Chesterton, Indiana
C	33	David Gebru	6 ft 10 in (2.08 m)	235 lb (107 kg)	So	Seattle, Washington
F	34	Don McAvoy III	6 ft 6 in (1.98 m)	220 lb (100 kg)	Jr	Chicago, Illinois
F/C	43	Terell Parks	6 ft 7 in (2.01 m)	215 lb (98 kg)	Jr	Beloit, Wisconsin
F	45	Jeremy McDonald	6 ft 7 in (2.01 m)	215 lb (98 kg)	Fr	Santa Maria, California

Head coach

- Jim Molinari (Illinois Wesleyan)

Assistant coach(es)

- Billy Wright (Bradley)
- Wade Hokenson (Minnesota)
- Steve Welch (Lakeland)

Legend

- (C) Team captain
- (S) Suspended
- (I) Ineligible
- (W) Walk-on
- Injured
- Current redshirt

Roster
Last update: January 10, 2023

== Schedule and results ==
Date time, TV	Rank^{#}	Opponent^{#}	Result	Record	Site city, state
Regular season
November 12, 2011*; 1:00 pm		at Dayton	L 58–87	0–1	UD Arena (12,454); Dayton, OH
November 17, 2011*; 7:00 pm		at No. 17 Michigan	L 55–59	0–2	Crisler Center (8,026); Ann Arbor, MI
November 22, 2011*; 7:00 pm		Greenville	W 84–49	1–2	Western Hall (387); Macomb, IL
November 26, 2011*; 2:00 pm		at North Dakota	W 65–62	2–2	Betty Engelstad Sioux Center (1,566); Grand Forks, ND
December 1, 2011; 7:00 pm		North Dakota State	W 55–51	3–2 (1–0)	Western Hall (878); Macomb, IL
December 3, 2011; 7:00 pm		South Dakota State	L 66–67	3–3 (1–1)	Western Hall; Macomb, IL
December 10, 2011*; 7:00 pm		Eastern Illinois	W 64–48	4–3	Western Hall (1,624); Macomb, IL
December 19, 2011*; 7:30 pm		at UIC	L 56–57	4–4	UIC Pavilion (2,437); Chicago, IL
December 22, 2011*; 7:00 pm		North Dakota	W 68–46	5–4	Western Hall (426); Macomb, IL
December 27, 2011*; 7:30 pm		Eureka	W 73–52	6–4	Western Hall (794); Macomb, IL
December 30, 2011; 6:00 pm		at IUPUI	L 68–75	6–5 (1–2)	IUPUI Gymnasium (1,645); Indianapolis, IN
January 3, 2012; 7:00 pm		South Dakota	W 67–44	7–5 (2–2)	Western Hall (370); Macomb, IL
January 5, 2012; 6:00 pm		at Oakland	W 71–61	8–5 (3–2)	Athletics Center O'Rena (2,115); Rochester, MI
January 7, 2012; 1:30 pm		at IPFW	W 75–65	9–5 (4–2)	Allen County War Memorial Coliseum (1,682); Fort Wayne, IN
January 12, 2012; 7:00 pm		Oral Roberts	L 70–71 ^{2OT}	9–6 (4–3)	Western Hall (1,029); Macomb, IL
January 14, 2012; 7:00 pm		Southern Utah	L 55–65	9–7 (4–4)	Western Hall (1,224); Macomb, IL
January 19, 2012; 7:05 pm		at UMKC	L 50–72	9–8 (4–5)	Swinney Recreation Center (774); Kansas City, MO
January 21, 2012; 7:30 pm		at South Dakota	W 60–56	10–8 (5–5)	DakotaDome (2,069); Vermillion, SD
January 24, 2012*; 7:00 pm		at Nebraska–Omaha	W 81–70	11–8	Sapp Fieldhouse (831); Omaha, NE
January 28, 2012; 7:00 pm		IUPUI	W 57–55	12–8 (6–5)	Western Hall (1,897); Macomb, IL
February 2, 2012; 7:00 pm		IPFW	W 62–52	13–8 (7–5)	Western Hall (1,289); Macomb, IL
February 4, 2012; 7:00 pm		Oakland	L 70–74 ^{2OT}	13–9 (7–6)	Western Hall (2,124); Macomb, IL
February 9, 2012; 8:00 pm		at Southern Utah	L 44–60	13–10 (7–7)	Centrum Arena (2,843); Cedar City, UT
February 11, 2012; 7:05 pm		at Oral Roberts	L 51–61	13–11 (7–8)	Mabee Center (8,617); Tulsa, OK
February 15, 2012; 7:00 pm		UMKC	W 47–42	14–11 (8–8)	Western Hall; Macomb, IL
February 18, 2012; 7:05 pm		at Evansville; ESPN BracketBusters	L 45–68	14–12	Ford Center (5,147); Evansville, IN
February 23, 2012; 7:00 pm		at South Dakota State	L 57–74	14–13 (8–9)	Frost Arena (2,174); Brookings, SD
February 25, 2012; 7:30 pm		at North Dakota State	W 77–64	15–13 (9–9)	Bison Sports Arena (3,528); Fargo, ND
February 29, 2012*; 7:00 pm		Nebraska–Omaha	W 72–51	16–13	Western Hall (2,276); Macomb, IL
Summit League tournament
March 4, 2012; 6:05 pm	(4)	vs. (5) North Dakota State; Summit Quarterfinals	W 58–53	17–13	Sioux Falls Arena (2,835); Sioux Falls, SD
March 5, 2012; 6:05 pm	(4)	vs. (1) Oral Roberts; Summit Semifinals	W 54–53	18–13	Sioux Falls Arena (6,448); Sioux Falls, SD
March 6, 2012; 8:05 pm	(4)	vs. (2) South Dakota State; Summit Championship	L 50–52 ^{OT}	18–14	Sioux Falls Arena (6,529); Sioux Falls, SD
CBI
March 14, 2012; 9:00 pm		at Oregon State; CBI First Round	L 59–80	18–15	Gill Coliseum (1,931); Corvallis, OR
*Non-conference game. ^{#}Rankings from AP Poll. (#) Tournament seedings in parentheses. All times are in Central Time.
