= 2011–12 North Dakota State Bison men's basketball team =

American college basketball season

2011–12 North Dakota State Bison men's basketball

CBI, First round
- Conference: Summit League
- Record: 17–14 (9–9 Summit)
- Head coach: Saul Phillips (5th season)
- Assistant coaches: David Richman; Will Ryan; Jason Kemp
- Home arena: Bison Sports Arena

2011–12 Summit League men's basketball standings
	Conf.				Overall
Team	W		L	PCT	W		L	PCT
Oral Roberts	17	–	1	.944	27	–	7	.794
South Dakota State †	15	–	3	.833	27	–	8	.771
Oakland	11	–	7	.611	20	–	16	.556
Western Illinois	9	–	9	.500	18	–	15	.545
North Dakota State	9	–	9	.500	17	–	14	.548
Southern Utah	8	–	10	.444	14	–	17	.452
IUPUI	7	–	11	.389	14	–	18	.438
South Dakota *	5	–	13	.278	10	–	18	.357
IPFW	5	–	13	.278	11	–	19	.367
UMKC	4	–	14	.222	10	–	21	.323
† 2012 Summit League tournament winner Rankings from AP Poll * Ineligible for conference tournament

The 2011–12 North Dakota State Bison men's basketball team represented North Dakota State University in the 2011–12 NCAA Division I men's basketball season. The Bison, led by head coach Saul Phillips, played their home games at Bison Sports Arena in Fargo, North Dakota, as members of the Summit League. After finishing 5th in the Summit during the regular season, and was eliminated in the first round of the Summit League tournament by Western Illinois.

North Dakota State failed to qualify for the NCAA tournament, but received a bid to the 2012 College Basketball Invitational. The Bison were eliminated in the first round of the CBI by Wyoming, 78–75.

== Roster ==
2011–12 North Dakota State Bison men's basketball team
Players
Coaches

Pos.	#	Name	Height	Weight	Year	Hometown
G	0	Fred Newell	5 ft 8 in (1.73 m)	155 lb (70 kg)	So	Lakeville, Minnesota
G	3	Mike Felt	6 ft 3 in (1.91 m)	185 lb (84 kg)	So	Redwood Falls, Minnesota
G	4	Joel Lindberg	6 ft 2 in (1.88 m)	190 lb (86 kg)	Fr	Superior, Wisconsin
F	12	Drew Lundberg	6 ft 1 in (1.85 m)	195 lb (88 kg)	Sr	Owatonna, Minnesota
G	13	Nate Zastrow	6 ft 0 in (1.83 m)	175 lb (79 kg)	Jr	Manitowoc, Wisconsin
G	21	Dylan Hale	6 ft 1 in (1.85 m)	175 lb (79 kg)	RS So	Saint Paul, Minnesota
G	22	Lawrence Alexander	6 ft 3 in (1.91 m)	175 lb (79 kg)	Fr	Peoria, Illinois
G	24	Taylor Braun	6 ft 7 in (2.01 m)	205 lb (93 kg)	So	Newberg, Oregon
F	25	Eric Carlson	6 ft 6 in (1.98 m)	220 lb (100 kg)	Sr	Shakopee, Minnesota
F	32	TrayVonn Wright	6 ft 7 in (2.01 m)	180 lb (82 kg)	So	Waterloo, Iowa
F	34	Chris Kading	6 ft 8 in (2.03 m)	220 lb (100 kg)	Fr	De Pere, Wisconsin
F	42	Marshall Bjorklund	6 ft 8 in (2.03 m)	240 lb (109 kg)	So	Arlington, Minnesota
F	44	Jordan Aaberg	6 ft 9 in (2.06 m)	225 lb (102 kg)	RS So	Rothsay, Minnesota
F	50	Andy Nagel	6 ft 9 in (2.06 m)	245 lb (111 kg)	Jr	Fort Dodge, Iowa

Head coach

- Saul Phillips (UW–Platteville)

Assistant coach(es)

- David Richman (North Dakota State)
- Will Ryan (Milwaukee)
- Jason Kemp (UW–La Crosse)

Legend

- (C) Team captain
- (S) Suspended
- (I) Ineligible
- (W) Walk-on
- Injured
- Current redshirt

Roster
Last update: January 13, 2023

== Schedule and results ==
Date time, TV	Rank^{#}	Opponent^{#}	Result	Record	Site city, state
Exhibition
November 1, 2011*; 7:30 pm		Minnesota State–Moorhead	L 84–90 ^{2OT}	—	Bison Sports Arena; Fargo, ND
November 5, 2011*; 7:00 pm		Concordia–Moorhead	W 90–48	—	Bison Sports Arena; Fargo, ND
Regular season
November 11, 2011*; 8:00 pm		at San Francisco; USF Hilltop Challenge	W 73–65	1–0	War Memorial Gymnasium (11,175); San Francisco, CA
November 12, 2011*; 10:30 pm		vs. Louisiana–Lafayette; USF Hilltop Challenge	W 78–58	2–0	War Memorial Gymnasium (1,119); San Francisco, CA
November 13, 2011*; 3:00 pm		vs. Northern Arizona; USF Hilltop Challenge	W 70–58	3–0	War Memorial Gymnasium (225); San Francisco, CA
November 16, 2011*; 7:00 pm, FS North/FS Wisconsin		Green Bay	W 65–61	4–0	Bison Sports Arena (2,450); Fargo, ND
November 22, 2011*; 8:00 pm		Nebraska–Omaha	W 98–65	5–0	Bison Sports Arena (2,103); Fargo, ND
November 26, 2011*; 7:00 pm, Midco Sports Net		Fresno State	W 78–65	6–0	Bison Sports Arena (3,251); Fargo, ND
December 1, 2011; 7:00 pm		at Western Illinois	L 51–55	6–1 (0–1)	Western Hall (878); Macomb, IL
December 3, 2011; 6:00 pm		at IUPUI	W 84–79	7–1 (1–1)	IUPUI Gymnasium (1,027); Indianapolis, IN
December 10, 2011*; 3:00 pm, FoxSportsArizona.com		at Arizona State	L 57–60	7–2	Wells Fargo Arena (4,995); Tempe, AZ
December 17, 2011*; 7:00 pm		Mayville State	W 92–50	8–2	Bison Sports Arena (1,625); Fargo, ND
December 22, 2011*; 7:00 pm, BTN.com		at Minnesota	L 59–63	8–3	Williams Arena (11,681); Minneapolis, MN
December 28, 2011; 7:00 pm, Midco Sports Net		Oakland	W 96–69	9–3 (2–1)	Bison Sports Arena (3,544); Fargo, ND
December 30, 2011; 7:00 pm		IPFW	W 84–68	10–3 (3–1)	Bison Sports Arena (3,076); Fargo, ND
January 5, 2012; 7:00 pm, FCS Central		at Oral Roberts	L 80–89	10–4 (3–2)	Mabee Center (2,524); Tulsa, OK
January 7, 2012; 8:30 pm		at Southern Utah	W 72–69 ^{OT}	11–4 (4–2)	Centrum Arena (2,245); Cedar City, UT
January 12, 2012; 7:00 pm		UMKC	W 55–54	12–4 (5–2)	Bison Sports Arena (3,119); Fargo, ND
January 14, 2012; 7:30 pm, Midco Sports Net		South Dakota	W 82–59	13–4 (6–2)	Bison Sports Arena (4,070); Fargo, ND
January 17, 2012*; 7:00 pm, FCS Central/Midco Sports Net		at North Dakota	L 54–59	13–5	Ralph Engelstad Arena (7,169); Grand Forks, ND
January 21, 2012; 7:00 pm		South Dakota State	L 88–91	13–6 (6–3)	Bison Sports Arena (5,011); Fargo, ND
January 26, 2012; 6:00 pm		at IPFW	L 66–75	13–7 (6–4)	Allen County War Memorial Coliseum (1,149); Fort Wayne, IN
January 28, 2012; 5:00 pm		at Oakland	W 78–75	14–7 (7–4)	Athletics Center O'rena (3,935); Rochester, MI
February 2, 2012; 7:00 pm, Midco Sports Net		Southern Utah	W 85–64	15–7 (8–4)	Bison Sports Arena (2,347); Fargo, ND
February 4, 2012; 7:30 pm		Oral Roberts	L 76–85	15–8 (8–5)	Bison Sports Arena (4,464); Fargo, ND
February 9, 2012; 7:00 pm		at UMKC	L 61–72	15–9 (8–6)	Swinney Recreation Center (841); Kansas City, MO
February 11, 2012; 7:30 pm, Midco Sports Net		at South Dakota	W 82–71	16–9 (9–6)	DakotaDome (1,952); Vermillion, SD
February 15, 2012; 7:00 pm, Midco Sports Net		at South Dakota State	L 57–80	16–10 (9–7)	Frost Arena (3,303); Brookings, SD
February 18, 2012*; 7:00 pm		Western Michigan	W 86–73	17–10	Bison Sports Arena (3,083); Fargo, ND
February 23, 2012; 7:00 pm		IUPUI	L 68–74	17–11 (9–8)	Bison Sports Arena (2,513); Fargo, ND
February 25, 2012; 7:30 pm		Western Illinois	L 64–77	17–12 (9–9)	Bison Sports Arena (3,528); Fargo, ND
Summit League tournament
March 4, 2012; 6:00 pm, Midco Sports Net/FCS Central	(5)	vs. (4) Western Illinois; Summit Quarterfinals	L 53–58	17–13	Sioux Falls Arena (2,835); Sioux Falls, SD
CBI
March 14, 2012; 8:00 pm		at Wyoming; CBI First Round	L 75–78	17–14	Arena-Auditorium (2,732); Laramie, WY
*Non-conference game. ^{#}Rankings from AP Poll. (#) Tournament seedings in parentheses. All times are in Central Time.
