= 2011–12 South Dakota State Jackrabbits men's basketball team =

American college basketball season

2011–12 South Dakota State Jackrabbits men's basketball

Summit League tournament champions

NCAA Tournament, Round of 64
- Conference: Summit League
- Record: 27–8 (15–3 The Summit)
- Head coach: Scott Nagy (17th season)
- Assistant coaches: Rob Klinkefus; Austin Hansen; Brian Cooley
- Home arena: Frost Arena

2011–12 Summit League men's basketball standings
| | Conf. | | | | Overall |
| Team | W | | L | PCT | W | | L | PCT |
|---|---|---|---|---|---|---|---|---|
| Oral Roberts | 17 | – | 1 | .944 | 27 | – | 7 | .794 |
| South Dakota State † | 15 | – | 3 | .833 | 27 | – | 8 | .771 |
| Oakland | 11 | – | 7 | .611 | 20 | – | 16 | .556 |
| Western Illinois | 9 | – | 9 | .500 | 18 | – | 15 | .545 |
| North Dakota State | 9 | – | 9 | .500 | 17 | – | 14 | .548 |
| Southern Utah | 8 | – | 10 | .444 | 14 | – | 17 | .452 |
| IUPUI | 7 | – | 11 | .389 | 14 | – | 18 | .438 |
| South Dakota * | 5 | – | 13 | .278 | 10 | – | 18 | .357 |
| IPFW | 5 | – | 13 | .278 | 11 | – | 19 | .367 |
| UMKC | 4 | – | 14 | .222 | 10 | – | 21 | .323 |
† 2012 Summit League tournament winner Rankings from AP Poll * Ineligible for conference tournament

The 2011–12 South Dakota State Jackrabbits men's basketball team represented South Dakota State University during the 2011–12 NCAA Division I men's basketball season. The Jackrabbits, led by 17th year head coach Scott Nagy, played their home games at Frost Arena and are members of The Summit League. They finished the season 27–8, 15–3 in The Summit League to finish in second place. They were champions of The Summit League Basketball tournament to earn the conference's automatic bid into the 2012 NCAA tournament. This was the Jackrabbits first ever NCAA Division I Tournament appearance. They lost in the second round to Baylor.

== Roster ==
2011–12 South Dakota State Jackrabbits men's basketball team
Players
Coaches

| Pos. | # | Name | Height | Weight | Year | Hometown |
|---|---|---|---|---|---|---|
| G | 3 | Nate Wolters | 6 ft 3 in (1.91 m) | 193 lb (88 kg) | Jr | St. Cloud, Minnesota |
| G | 4 | Cory Jacobsen | 6 ft 1 in (1.85 m) | 190 lb (86 kg) | Fr | Viborg, South Dakota |
| G | 5 | Taévaunn Prince | 6 ft 3 in (1.91 m) | 215 lb (98 kg) | Fr | Toronto, Ontario, Canada |
| G | 10 | Alex Olson | 6 ft 1 in (1.85 m) | 191 lb (87 kg) | Fr | Brookfield, Wisconsin |
| G | 12 | Brayden Carlson | 6 ft 4 in (1.93 m) | 210 lb (95 kg) | So | Brookings, South Dakota |
| G | 22 | Zach Monaghan | 6 ft 2 in (1.88 m) | 170 lb (77 kg) | Fr | Palatine, Illinois |
| G | 23 | Joey Feilmeier | 6 ft 1 in (1.85 m) | 160 lb (73 kg) | Fr | Jefferson, South Dakota |
| G/F | 24 | Zach Horstman | 6 ft 6 in (1.98 m) | 195 lb (88 kg) | Fr | Winner, South Dakota |
| G | 25 | Chad White | 6 ft 6 in (1.98 m) | 213 lb (97 kg) | So | Madison, South Dakota |
| G | 30 | Samuel Francis | 6 ft 3 in (1.91 m) | 185 lb (84 kg) | Fr | Silistra, Bulgaria |
| F | 32 | Marcus Heemstra | 6 ft 9 in (2.06 m) | 215 lb (98 kg) | So | Rock Valley, Iowa |
| G | 33 | Griffan Callahan | 6 ft 4 in (1.93 m) | 200 lb (91 kg) | Sr | Seneca, Illinois |
| F | 34 | Tony Fiegen | 6 ft 7 in (2.01 m) | 220 lb (100 kg) | Jr | Madison, South Dakota |
| F | 42 | Jordan Dykstra | 6 ft 8 in (2.03 m) | 235 lb (107 kg) | So | Rock Valley, Iowa |
| F | 44 | Austin Hennings | 6 ft 6 in (1.98 m) | 230 lb (104 kg) | So | Council Bluffs, Iowa |

Head coach

- Scott Nagy (Delta State)

Assistant coach(es)

- Brian Cooley (Nebraska Wesleyan)
- Austin Hansen (South Dakota State)
- Jason Kemp (Buena Vista)

Legend

- (C) Team captain
- (S) Suspended
- (I) Ineligible
- (W) Walk-on
- Injured
- Current redshirt

Roster
Last update: January 13, 2023

== Schedule ==
| Date time, TV | Rank^{#} | Opponent^{#} | Result | Record | Site (attendance) city, state |
Exhibition
| November 3, 2011*; 8:30 pm | | Minnesota State–Moorhead | W 77–64 | — | Frost Arena (1,776); Brookings, SD |
Regular season
| November 12, 2011*; 1:00 pm | | Western Michigan | W 82–76 | 1–0 | Frost Arena (1,632); Brookings, SD |
| November 14, 2011*; 7:00 pm | | at Minnesota | L 55–71 | 1–1 | Williams Arena (10,460); Minneapolis, MN |
| November 16, 2011*; 6:00 pm | | at Georgia; CBE Classic | L 61–72 | 1–2 | Stegeman Coliseum (4,913); Athens, GA |
| November 21, 2011*; 3:30 pm | | vs. Niagara; CBE Classic | W 79–71 | 2–2 | University Center (1,537); Macon, GA |
| November 22, 2011*; 3:30 pm | | vs. Sam Houston State; CBE Classic | W 77–60 | 3–2 | University Center (1,422); Macon, GA |
| November 23, 2011*; 6:00 pm | | at Mercer; CBE Classic | W 74–61 | 4–2 | University Center (1,568); Macon, GA |
| November 26, 2011*; 1:00 pm | | at Nebraska | L 64–76 | 4–3 | Bob Devaney Sports Center (9,107); Lincoln, NE |
| December 1, 2011; 6:00 pm | | at IUPUI | W 97–93 ^{OT} | 5–3 (1–0) | IUPUI Gymnasium (1,085); Indianapolis, IN |
| December 3, 2011; 7:00 pm | | at Western Illinois | W 67–66 | 6–3 (2–0) | Western Hall (1,038); Macomb, IL |
| December 6, 2011*; 7:00 pm | | Southwest Minnesota State | W 92–69 | 7–3 | Frost Arena (1,918); Brookings, SD |
| December 10, 2011*; 7:30 pm | | North Dakota | W 92–54 | 8–3 | Frost Arena (4,104); Brookings, SD |
| December 12, 2011*; 7:00 pm | | Dakota State | W 93–60 | 9–3 | Frost Arena (1,444); Brookings, SD |
| December 15, 2011*; 7:00 pm | | at North Dakota | L 70–89 | 9–4 | Betty Engelstad Sioux Center (1,495); Grand Forks, ND |
| December 18, 2011*; 2:00 pm | | at Washington | W 92–73 | 10–4 | Alaska Airlines Arena (9,060); Seattle, WA |
| December 28, 2011; 7:00 pm | | IPFW | W 94–58 | 11–4 (3–0) | Frost Arena (2,335); Brookings, SD |
| December 30, 2011; 7:00 pm | | Oakland | W 76–64 | 12–4 (4–0) | Frost Arena (3,803); Brookings, SD |
| January 5, 2012; 8:00 pm | | at Southern Utah | W 75–68 | 13–4 (5–0) | Centrum Arena (1,981); Cedar City, UT |
| January 7, 2012; 7:00 pm | | at Oral Roberts | L 75–97 | 13–5 (5–1) | Mabee Center (3,725); Tulsa, OK |
| January 12, 2012; 7:00 pm | | South Dakota | W 86–56 | 14–5 (6–1) | Frost Arena (6,216); Brookings, SD |
| January 14, 2012; 7:30 pm | | UMKC | W 85–58 | 15–5 (7–1) | Frost Arena (2,607); Brookings, SD |
| January 21, 2012; 7:00 pm | | at North Dakota State | W 91–88 ^{OT} | 16–5 (8–1) | Bison Sports Arena (5,011); Fargo, ND |
| January 26, 2012; 6:00 pm | | at Oakland | L 87–92 | 16–6 (8–2) | Athletics Center O'rena (2,935); Rochester, MI |
| January 28, 2012; 6:00 pm | | at IPFW | W 74–43 | 17–6 (9–2) | Allen County War Memorial Coliseum (1,856); Fort Wayne, IN |
| February 2, 2012; 7:00 pm | | Oral Roberts | W 75–60 | 18–6 (10–2) | Frost Arena (4,255); Brookings, SD |
| February 4, 2012; 7:30 pm | | Southern Utah | W 66–56 | 19–6 (11–2) | Frost Arena (3,382); Brookings, SD |
| February 9, 2012; 7:00 pm | | at South Dakota | L 68–72 | 19–7 (11–3) | DakotaDome (5,189); Vermillion, SD |
| February 11, 2012; 7:00 pm | | at UMKC | W 75–62 | 20–7 (12–3) | Swinney Recreation Center (1,231); Kansas City, MO |
| February 15, 2012; 7:00 pm | | North Dakota State | W 80–57 | 21–7 (13–3) | Frost Arena (3,303); Brookings, SD |
| February 18, 2012*; 12:00 pm, ESPNU | | Buffalo; ESPN BracketBusters | W 86–65 | 22–7 | Frost Arena (5,378); Brookings, SD |
| February 23, 2012; 7:00 pm | | Western Illinois | W 74–57 | 23–7 (14–3) | Frost Arena (2,174); Brookings, SD |
| February 25, 2012; 7:30 pm | | IUPUI | W 75–64 | 24–7 (15–3) | Frost Arena (3,933); Brookings, SD |
Summit League tournament
| March 3, 2012; 8:30 pm, FCS | (2) | vs. (7) IUPUI; Quarterfinals | W 77–56 | 25–7 | Sioux Falls Arena (6,614); Sioux Falls, SD |
| March 5, 2012; 8:30 pm, FCS | (2) | vs. (6) Southern Utah; Semifinals | W 63–47 | 26–7 | Sioux Falls Arena (6,448); Sioux Falls, SD |
| March 6, 2012; 8:00 pm, ESPN2 | (2) | vs. (4) Western Illinois; Championship Game | W 52–50 ^{OT} | 27–7 | Sioux Falls Arena (6,526); Sioux Falls, SD |
NCAA tournament
| March 15, 2012*; 6:50 pm, truTV | (S 14) | vs. (S 3) No. 9 Baylor; Second Round | L 60–68 | 27–8 | The Pit (11,839); Albuquerque, NM |
*Non-conference game. ^{#}Rankings from AP Poll. (#) Tournament seedings in parentheses. All times are in Central Time.
