= 2011–12 UMKC Kangaroos men's basketball team =

American college basketball season

2011–12 UMKC Kangaroos men's basketball
- Conference: The Summit League
- Record: 10–21 (4–14 Summit)
- Head coach: Matt Brown (5th season)
- Assistant coaches: Martin Unger (5th season); Wendell Moore (4th season); Stephen Brough (3rd season)
- Home arena: Swinney Recreation Center, Municipal Auditorium

2011–12 Summit League men's basketball standings
	Conf.				Overall
Team	W		L	PCT	W		L	PCT
Oral Roberts	17	–	1	.944	27	–	7	.794
South Dakota State †	15	–	3	.833	27	–	8	.771
Oakland	11	–	7	.611	20	–	16	.556
Western Illinois	9	–	9	.500	18	–	15	.545
North Dakota State	9	–	9	.500	17	–	14	.548
Southern Utah	8	–	10	.444	14	–	17	.452
IUPUI	7	–	11	.389	14	–	18	.438
South Dakota *	5	–	13	.278	10	–	18	.357
IPFW	5	–	13	.278	11	–	19	.367
UMKC	4	–	14	.222	10	–	21	.323
† 2012 Summit League tournament winner Rankings from AP Poll * Ineligible for conference tournament

The 2011–12 UMKC Kangaroos men's basketball team represented the University of Missouri–Kansas City during the 2011–12 NCAA Division I men's basketball season. The Kangaroos played most of their home games on-campus at Swinney Recreation Center (with one game off-campus at Municipal Auditorium), in Kansas City, Missouri as a member of The Summit League.

== Previous season ==
The Kangaroos finished the 2010–11 season with a record of 12–18 overall, 6–12 in The Summit League to finish in eighth place.

== Roster ==
2011–12 UMKC Kangaroos men's basketball team
Players
Coaches

Pos.	#	Name	Height	Weight	Year	Previous school	Hometown
G	10	Reggie Chamberlain	6 ft 0 in (1.83 m)	170 lb (77 kg)	RS Sr	Wichita State/ Seward County CC; Raytown Senior HS	Kansas City, MO
G	12	Dustin Dibble	6 ft 4 in (1.93 m)	195 lb (88 kg)	Sr	Petoskey HS	Petoskey, MI
G	1	Michael Gholston, Jr.	6 ft 0 in (1.83 m)	175 lb (79 kg)	Sr	State Fair CC; Raytown South HS	Raytown, MO
F/C	4	Bernard Kamwa	6 ft 8 in (2.03 m)	245 lb (111 kg)	Sr	Sequoias; Genesis One Christian/ William Howard Taft Charter HS/ Ribét	Republic of Cameroon
G	20	Trevor Mason	5 ft 10 in (1.78 m)	170 lb (77 kg)	Sr	Bishop Miege HS	Overland Park, KS
G/F	3	Jordan Payton	6 ft 5 in (1.96 m)	190 lb (86 kg)	Jr	Mississippi Gulf Coast CC/ Norfolk State; Heat Basketball/ Hebron/ Charter of San Diego	San Diego, CA
C	33	Brad Reid	6 ft 11 in (2.11 m)	275 lb (125 kg)	Jr	Roane State CC; Westminster Senior	Tantanoola, South Australia
G/F	13	Thomas Staton	6 ft 6 in (1.98 m)	220 lb (100 kg)	Jr	Independence CC/ Gardner–Webb; Clarkston HS	Southfield, MI
F/C	21	Fred Chatmon	6 ft 9 in (2.06 m)	220 lb (100 kg)	RS So	Garfield Heights HS	Cleveland, OH
F/C	44	Kirk Korver	6 ft 7 in (2.01 m)	225 lb (102 kg)	RS So	Pella HS	Pella, IA
G	0	Nate Rogers	6 ft 1 in (1.85 m)	195 lb (88 kg)	RS So	DePaul; St. Joseph HS	Maywood, IL
F	23	Trinity Hall	6 ft 7 in (2.01 m)	205 lb (93 kg)	So	Wyandotte HS	Kansas City, KS
G/F	5	Trevor Franklin (redshirt)	6 ft 6 in (1.98 m)	175 lb (79 kg)	Fr	Northeast HS	Oakland Park, FL
G	11	Estan Tyler	6 ft 1 in (1.85 m)	175 lb (79 kg)	Fr	Johnson Senior HS	St. Paul, MN

Head coach

- Matt Brown (Shippensburg)

Assistant coach(es)

- Martin Unger (Western Carolina)
- Wendell Moore (Georgia Southern)
- Stephen Brough (Miami (Ohio))

Legend

- (C) Team captain
- (S) Suspended
- (I) Ineligible
- (W) Walk-on
- (5Y) Fifth-year Senior
- Injured
- Current redshirt

Roster
Last update: November 3, 2024

== Schedule and results ==
Date time, TV	Rank^{#}	Opponent^{#}	Result	Record	High points	High rebounds	High assists	Site (attendance) city, state
Exhibition Season
November 1, 2011*; 7:05 PM		Benedictine (Kansas)	L 67–74		17 – Korver	8 – Rogers	5 – Tyler	Swinney Recreation Center (673); Kansas City, MO
November 5, 2011*; 5:05 PM		Tabor	W 90–67		26 – Chamberlain	7 – Kamwa, Reid, Korver	5 – Staton	Swinney Recreation Center (363); Kansas City, MO
Regular Season
November 11, 2011*; 1:00 PM		Northwest Missouri State	L 62–66	0–1	19 – Chamberlain	7 – Dibble, Kamwa	2 – Chamberlain	Swinney Recreation Center (753); Kansas City, MO
November 13, 2011*; 4:00 PM		at Bradley; Chicago Invitational Challenge; Campus Round	L 58–68	0–2	14 – Hall	11 – Dibble	5 – Tyler	Carver Arena (7,032); Peoria, IL
November 16, 2011*; 7:05 PM, KSMO–TV		Nebraska–Omaha	W 77–74	1–2	28 – Chamberlain	9 – Hall	3 – Chamberlain, Tyler	Swinney Recreation Center (704); Kansas City, MO
November 19, 2011*; 8:00 PM		at Utah Valley	L 54–58	1–3	19 – Chamberlain	9 – Staton	2 – Chamberlain, Staton, Korver	Utah Community; Credit Union Center (6,437); Orem, UT
November 22, 2011*; 7:00 PM		at No. 11 Wisconsin; Chicago Invitational Challenge; Campus Round	L 31–77	1–4	7 – Chamberlain, Hall	4 – Staton, Korver, Hall, Tyler	1 – Chamberlain, Gholston, Jr., Tyler	Kohl Center (17,230); Madison, WI
November 25, 2011*; 2:30 PM		vs. Wofford; Chicago Invitational Challenge; Lower Bracket [Semifinal]	W 64–58 ^{OT}	2–4	22 – Chamberlain	6 – Tyler	4 – Chamberlain, Staton	Sears Centre Arena; Hoffman Estates, IL
November 26, 2011*; 2:00 PM		vs. Longwood; Chicago Invitational Challenge; Lower Bracket [Final]	W 93–53	3–4	24 – Chamberlain	9 – Staton	6 – Tyler	Sears Centre Arena; Hoffman Estates, IL
December 1, 2011; 6:30 PM		at IPFW	W 81–66	4–4 (1–0)	21 – Chamberlain	6 – Korver	5 – Rogers	Allen County; War Memorial Coliseum (1,621); Fort Wayne, IN
December 3, 2011; 5:00 PM		at Oakland	L 73–86	4–5 (1–1)	30 – Chamberlain	7 – Chatmon	4 – Tyler	Athletics Center O'rena (2,285); Auburn Hills, MI
December 7, 2011*; 7:05 PM, KSMO–TV		North Dakota	W 78–75	5–5	20 – Chamberlain	9 – Staton, Korver	6 – Chamberlain	Swinney Recreation Center (1,131); Kansas City, MO
December 10, 2011*; 7:00 PM		at Southeast Missouri State	W 74–69	6–5	23 – Chamberlain	7 – Korver	5 – Chamberlain	Show Me Center (1,850); Cape Girardeau, MO
December 16, 2011*; 7:05 PM, KSMO–TV		Canisius	W 72–67	7–5	27 – Hall	6 – Chatmon, Hall	5 – Tyler	Municipal Auditorium (4,432); Kansas City, MO
December 19, 2011*; 7:30 PM		at No. 20 Michigan State	L 54–89	7–6	16 – Hall	6 – Rogers	3 – Rogers, Tyler	Jack Breslin; Student Events Center (14,797); East Lansing, MI
December 22, 2011*; 8:00 PM		at New Mexico	L 62–87	7–7	12 – Chamberlain	5 – Chamberlain	3 – Tyler	University Arena (13,419); Albuquerque, NM
December 28, 2011; 7:05 PM, KSMO–TV		Oral Roberts	L 65–72	7–8 (1–2)	17 – Chamberlain	5 – Staton	5 – Tyler	Swinney Recreation Center (1,504); Kansas City, MO
December 30, 2011; 7:05 PM		Southern Utah	L 77–91	7–9 (1–3)	22 – Chamberlain	4 – Staton	4 – Chamberlain, Staton	Swinney Recreation Center (847); Kansas City, MO
January 3, 2012; 6:00 PM		at IUPUI	L 74–83	7–10 (1–4)	15 – Staton	9 – Staton	6 – Tyler	IUPUI Gymnasium (995); Indianapolis, IN
January 7, 2012; 7:05 PM, KSMO–TV		South Dakota	L 57–76	7–11 (1–5)	19 – Chamberlain	7 – Staton	3 – Chamberlain, Gholston, Jr., Staton, Tyler	Swinney Recreation Center (1,091); Kansas City, MO
January 12, 2012; 7:00 PM		at North Dakota State	L 54–55	7–12 (1–6)	16 – Chamberlain	8 – Staton	3 – Tyler	Bison Sports Arena (3,119); Fargo, ND
January 14, 2012; 7:30 PM		at South Dakota State	L 58–85	7–13 (1–7)	11 – Chamberlain, Staton	5 – Gholston, Jr., Staton	3 – Chamberlain	Frost Arena (2,607); Brookings, SD
January 19, 2012; 7:05 PM		Western Illinois	W 72–50	8–13 (2–7)	23 – Chamberlain	10 – Hall	4 – Chamberlain, Tyler	Swinney Recreation Center (774); Kansas City, MO
January 21, 2012; 7:05 PM, KSMO–TV		IUPUI	W 64–62	9–13 (3–7)	17 – Hall	4 – Hall	5 – Chamberlain	Swinney Recreation Center (1,504); Kansas City, MO
January 26, 2012; 8:00 PM		at Southern Utah	L 47–57	9–14 (3–8)	17 – Chamberlain	5 – Korver, Hall	4 – Rogers	Centrum Arena (2,327); Cedar City, UT
January 28, 2012; 7:05 PM		at Oral Roberts	L 67–77	9–15 (3–9)	17 – Hall	6 – Hall	2 – Chamberlain, Staton, Korver, Rogers	Mabee Center (6,850); Tulsa, OK
February 4, 2012; 7:30 PM		at South Dakota	L 63–79	9–16 (3–10)	19 – Chamberlain	7 – Chatmon	5 – Rogers, Tyler	DakotaDome (1,826); Vermillion, SD
February 9, 2012; 7:05 PM		North Dakota State	W 72–61	10–16 (4–10)	23 – Chamberlain	5 – Korver, Hall	5 – Tyler	Swinney Recreation Center (841); Kansas City, MO
February 11, 2012; 7:05 PM, KSMO–TV		South Dakota State	L 62–75	10–17 (4–11)	17 – Chamberlain	7 – Hall	7 – Tyler	Swinney Recreation Center (1,231); Kansas City, MO
February 15, 2012; 7:00 PM		at Western Illinois	L 42–47	10–18 (4–12)	14 – Chamberlain	5 – Hall	3 – Rogers	Western Hall (1,185); Macomb, IL
February 18, 2012*; 4:05 PM		Wright State; Sears BracketBuster	L 62–76	10–19	22 – Chamberlain	7 – Hall	4 – Chamberlain	Swinney Recreation Center (888); Kansas City, MO
February 23, 2012; 7:05 PM		Oakland	L 56–89	10–20 (4–13)	14 – Reid	5 – Chatmon	3 – Gholston, Jr., Staton	Swinney Recreation Center (1,112); Kansas City, MO
February 25, 2012; 7:05 PM, KSMO–TV		IPFW	L 73–76	10–21 (4–14)	26 – Chamberlain	7 – Chatmon	4 – Staton	Swinney Recreation Center (1,505); Kansas City, MO
*Non-conference game. ^{#}Rankings from AP Poll. (#) Tournament seedings in parentheses. All times are in Central Standard Time (CST).
