= Scott Nagy =

American basketball coach (born 1966)

Current position
- Title: Head coach
- Team: Southern Illinois
- Conference: MVC
- Record: 33–38 (.465)

Biographical details
- Born: June 7, 1966 (age 60); Abilene, Texas, U.S.

Playing career
- 1984–1988: Delta State

Coaching career (HC unless noted)
- 1988–1990: Illinois (assistant)
- 1990–1993: South Dakota State (assistant)
- 1993–1995: SIU Edwardsville (assistant)
- 1995–2016: South Dakota State
- 2016–2024: Wright State
- 2024–present: Southern Illinois

Head coaching record
- Overall: 610–370 (.622)
- Tournaments: 1–5 (NCAA Division I); 1–2 (NIT); 0–1 (CBI); 6–8 (NCAA Division II)

Accomplishments and honors

Championships
- 4× NCC regular season (1996–1998, 2002); 3× Summit League regular season (2013, 2015, 2016); 3× Summit League tournament (2012, 2013, 2016); 2× Horizon League tournament (2018, 2022); 3× Horizon League regular season (2019–2021)

Awards
- 3× Horizon League Coach of the Year (2018–2020)

Scott Michael Nagy (/ˈnæɡi/; born June 7, 1966) is an American college basketball coach and the current head coach for Southern Illinois Salukis men's basketball. He had previously served as head coach at South Dakota State for 21 seasons (1995–2016).

== Biography ==
Born in Abilene, Texas, Nagy attended St. Matthews grade school in Champaign, Illinois and Champaign Centennial High School, which he graduated from in 1984. His father is Dick Nagy, who was a University of Illinois assistant basketball coach under Lou Henson.

Nagy played basketball collegiately at Delta State University, where he currently holds school records for most career games played and most assists in a career (549), season (234) and game (15).

After graduation, Nagy became a graduate assistant at the University of Illinois for two seasons before taking a full-time assistant's job at South Dakota State, which he held for three years. After two seasons as an assistant at SIU Edwardsville, Nagy returned to South Dakota State to take over as head coach in May 1995.

Nagy led the Jackrabbits to 20-win seasons during eight of his first nine years at the helm of the program at the Division II level. After the 2004 season, South Dakota State began the transition to Division I.

The 2007–08 season was Nagy's first as a head coach in a Division I conference, as the Jackrabbits joined The Summit League on June 1, 2007. The Jackrabbits struggled early in The Summit League, finishing in 10th place their first year. However, under Nagy, SDSU steadily improved.

In 2011–12, South Dakota State won the Summit League tournament championship, qualifying them for their first ever berth in the NCAA tournament. The Jackrabbits also won the conference tournament in 2013 earning back-to-back trips to the NCAA tournament. In 2014, the Jackrabbits received an invitation to the College Basketball Invitational tournament. In 2015, Nagy led the Jackrabbits to a regular season championship and an NIT berth after failing to win the conference tournament. SDSU won their first postseason game in the NIT, defeating No. 1 seed Colorado State before falling to Vanderbilt. In 2016, the Jackrabbits returned to the NCAA tournament by winning the regular season and conference tournament. He finished his 21-year career at South Dakota State with a 410–240 record.

Following his success at South Dakota State, he was hired as head coach by Wright State on April 3, 2016. The Raiders had a 167–92 overall record without a losing season and won the Horizon League championship twice in 2018 and 2022 during his eight-year tenure. Clint Sargent was promoted to succeed Nagy on March 28, 2024.

Coinciding with Nagy's departure from Wright State was his appointment as head coach at Southern Illinois University Carbondale also on March 28. He replaced Bryan Mullins who was dismissed twenty days prior on March 8.

Nagy coaches at least one game every season shoeless to support the charity Samaritan's Feet, which distributes shoes to those without worldwide. He has done so every year since the 2007–08 season. He was named the 2012 Barefoot Coach of the Year, an award given to coaches who support the Samaritan's Feet organization and help raise awareness about its cause.

== Head coaching record ==
Record table
Season	Team	Overall	Conference	Standing	Postseason
South Dakota State Jackrabbits (North Central Conference) (1995–2004)
1995–96	South Dakota State	24–5	15–3	T–1st	NCAA Division II Sweet 16
1996–97	South Dakota State	25–5	14–4	1st	NCAA Division II Sweet 16
1997–98	South Dakota State	26–3	16–2	1st	NCAA Division II Sweet 16
1998–99	South Dakota State	17–10	9–9	4th	
1999–00	South Dakota State	21–9	12–6	2nd	NCAA Division II first round
2000–01	South Dakota State	22–7	13–5	2nd	NCAA Division II first round
2001–02	South Dakota State	24–6	15–3	1st	NCAA Division II Sweet 16
2002–03	South Dakota State	24–7	12–4	2nd	NCAA Division II second round
2003–04	South Dakota State	27–7	9–5	2nd	NCAA Division II second round
South Dakota State Jackrabbits (NCAA Division I independent) (2004–2007)
2004–05	South Dakota State	10–18			
2005–06	South Dakota State	9–20			
2006–07	South Dakota State	6–24			
South Dakota State Jackrabbits (Summit League) (2007–2016)
2007–08	South Dakota State	8–21	3–15	10th	
2008–09	South Dakota State	13–20	7–11	7th	
2009–10	South Dakota State	14–16	10–8	4th	
2010–11	South Dakota State	19–12	10–8	5th	
2011–12	South Dakota State	27–8	15–3	2nd	NCAA Division I Round of 64
2012–13	South Dakota State	25–10	13–3	T–1st	NCAA Division I Round of 64
2013–14	South Dakota State	19–13	10–4	2nd	CBI first round
2014–15	South Dakota State	24–11	12–4	T–1st	NIT second round
2015–16	South Dakota State	26–8	12–4	T–1st	NCAA Division I Round of 64
South Dakota State:		410–240 (.631)	207–101 (.672)		
Wright State Raiders (Horizon League) (2016–2024)
2016–17	Wright State	20–12	11–7	5th	
2017–18	Wright State	25–10	14–4	2nd	NCAA Division I Round of 64
2018–19	Wright State	21–14	13–5	T–1st	NIT first round
2019–20	Wright State	25–7	15–3	1st	No postseason held
2020–21	Wright State	18–6	16–4	T–1st	
2021–22	Wright State	22–14	15–7	4th	NCAA Division I Round of 64
2022–23	Wright State	18–15	10–10	T–6th	
2023–24	Wright State	18–14	13–7	T–3rd	
Wright State:		167–92 (.645)	107–47 (.695)		
Southern Illinois Salukis (Missouri Valley Conference) (2024–present)
2024–25	Southern Illinois	14–19	8–12	T–8th	
2025–26	Southern Illinois	16–16	10–10	8th	
2026–27	Southern Illinois	3-3			
Southern Illinois:		33–38 (.465)	18–22 (.450)		
Total:		610–370 (.622)			
National champion Postseason invitational champion Conference regular season champion Conference regular season and conference tournament champion Division regular season champion Division regular season and conference tournament champion Conference tournament champion

== See also ==
- List of college men's basketball coaches with 600 wins
