= Brett Winkelman =

American basketball player (born 1986)

Personal information
- Born: January 30, 1986 (age 40)
- Listed height: 6 ft 6 in (1.98 m)
- Listed weight: 220 lb (100 kg)

Career information
- High school: Morris Area (Morris, Minnesota)
- College: North Dakota State (2005–2009)
- NBA draft: 2009: undrafted
- Playing career: 2009–2011
- Position: Small forward

Career history
- 2009–2010: Pallacanestro Pavia
- 2010: Anwil Włocławek
- 2010–2011: Minas Tênis Clube

Career highlights
- Academic All-American of the Year (2009); 2x First team All-Summit League (2008, 2009)

Brett Winkelman (born January 30, 1986) is an American former professional basketball player who played in Italy, Poland, and Brazil.

From 2005 to 2009 Winkelman played for the North Dakota State Bison men's basketball team. He majored in industrial engineering. He earned all-independent honors in 2007 and in 2008 and 2009 he was selected to the First-team All-Summit League. In 2009 Winkelman helped lead the Bison to a Summit League tournament victory and an automatic bid to the 2009 NCAA tournament. Brett Winkelman holds the NDSU all-time rebound record and sits second to teammate Ben Woodside on the NDSU all-time scoring record list. In 2009 Winkelman was named Division I Men's Basketball Academic All-American of the Year.

In July 2009, he signed with Nuova Pallacanestro Pavia in Italy.

In February 2010 he moved to Poland (Anwil Włocławek).

== College statistics ==
College Statistics

Year	Team	GP	GS	MPG	FG%	3P%	FT%	RPG	APG	SPG	BPG	PPG
2005-06	North Dakota State	28	28	31.3	.507	.471	.788	6.9	2.1	1.2	0.4	12.2
2006–07	North Dakota State	28	28	32.0	.518	.424	.793	6.8	2.2	1.4	0.5	16.1
2007–08	North Dakota State	29	29	31.8	.516	.438	.818	8.3	2.1	1.0	0.4	19.2
2008–09	North Dakota State	33	33	33.0	.502	.396	.809	7.5	1.8	1.5	0.4	18.6

== Personal life ==
Winkelman is married and has two children. After his time in Brazil, he returned to Fargo and attended North Dakota State University again where he earned his MBA. He then worked for Fargo Assembly Company as a plant manager before becoming the company's president.

== See also ==
- 2009 NCAA Men's Basketball All-Americans

== Sources ==
- ESPN Stats
- Gobison.com
