= Ben Woodside =

American basketball player (born 1985)

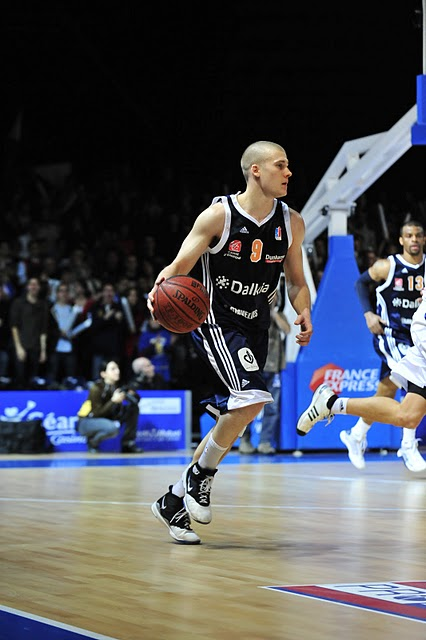

Personal information
- Listed height: 5 ft 11 in (1.80 m)
- Listed weight: 185 lb (84 kg)

Career information
- High school: Albert Lea (Albert Lea, Minnesota)
- College: North Dakota State (2005–2009)
- NBA draft: 2009: undrafted
- Playing career: 2009–2017
- Position: Point guard

Career history
- 2009–2011: BCM Gravelines
- 2011: Union Olimpija
- 2011–2012: BC Armia
- 2012–2013: TED Ankara Kolejliler
- 2013–2014: Vanoli Cremona
- 2014–2015: CB Sevilla
- 2015–2016: Türk Telekom
- 2016–2017: New Zealand Breakers

Career highlights
- Georgian League champion (2012); Georgian League All-Star (2012); Leaders Cup champion (2011); French League All-Star (2010); AP Honorable Mention All-American (2009); Summit League Player of the Year (2009); 2× First-team All-Summit League (2008, 2009); Summit League tournament MVP (2009)

Benjamin Michael Woodside (born July 1, 1985) is an American former professional basketball player who spent the majority of his eight-year career playing in Europe.

== College career ==
From 2005 to 2009, Woodside was a member of the North Dakota State Bison men's basketball team. As a senior in 2008–09, he was named Summit League Player of the Year. On December 12, 2008, he had a 60-point performance against Stephen F. Austin. Ten days later, Woodside became North Dakota State's career scoring leader in a 90–68 win over Northern Arizona. He went on to lead the Bison to win the Summit League tournament and qualify for the 2009 NCAA tournament in their first year of eligibility. In 2008–09, he averaged 23.2 points, 3.2 rebounds, 6.2 assists and 1.4 steals in 33 games.

=== College statistics ===
Legend
GP	Games played	GS	Games started	MPG	Minutes per game
FG%	Field goal percentage	3P%	3-point field goal percentage	FT%	Free throw percentage
RPG	Rebounds per game	APG	Assists per game	SPG	Steals per game
BPG	Blocks per game	PPG	Points per game	**Bold**	Career high

Year	Team	GP	GS	MPG	FG%	3P%	FT%	RPG	APG	SPG	BPG	PPG
2005–06	North Dakota State	28	28	34.4	.432	.409	.796	3.0	5.1	**1.5**	**.2**	17.5
2006–07	North Dakota State	28	28	34.1	**.477**	.392	.822	2.9	5.1	**1.5**	.1	16.4
2007–08	North Dakota State	29	29	**36.6**	.461	.397	.830	2.7	5.1	**1.5**	.1	20.7
2008–09	North Dakota State	**33**	**33**	34.5	.464	**.427**	**.840**	**3.2**	**6.2**	1.4	**.2**	**23.2**
**Career**		118	118	34.9	.459	.407	.824	3.0	5.4	1.5	.1	19.6

== Professional career ==
After going undrafted in the 2009 NBA draft, Woodside joined the Minnesota Timberwolves summer league team. On August 7, 2009, he signed with French club BCM Gravelines for the 2009–10 season. In December 2009, he played in the French League All-Star game.

In July 2010, Woodside joined the Golden State Warriors summer league team. On August 2, 2010, he re-signed with BCM Gravelines. On December 4, 2011, he left Olimpija due to unpaid wages and immediately signed with BC Armia of the Georgian Superliga for the rest of the season.

On July 26, 2012, Woodside signed with Turkish club TED Ankara Kolejliler for the 2012–13 season.

On August 18, 2013, Woodside signed with the Italian club Vanoli Cremona for the 2013–14 season.

On July 3, 2014, Woodside signed with TED Ankara Kolejliler, returning to the club for a second stint. However, he was released by the club the following month after he failed physicals. On November 23, 2014, he signed with CB Sevilla of Spain for the rest of the season.

On June 8, 2015, Woodside signed with Turkish club Türk Telekom for the 2015–16 season.

On June 30, 2016, Woodside signed with the New Zealand Breakers for the 2016–17 NBL season. On November 8, 2016, he was ruled out for six to eight weeks after he ruptured the plantar fascia in his right foot. On January 7, 2017, he was released by the Breakers.

In April 2017, Woodside announced his retirement from basketball.

== See also ==
- List of NCAA Division I men's basketball players with 60 or more points in a game
