= North Dakota State Bison men's basketball =

2026–27 North Dakota State Bison men's basketball team
- University: North Dakota State University
- Head coach: David Richman (13th season)
- Location: Fargo, North Dakota
- Arena: Scheels Center (capacity: 5,460)
- Conference: Summit League
- Nickname: Bison
- Colors: Green and yellow

NCAA Division I tournament round of 32
- 1981*, 2014

NCAA Division I tournament appearances
- 1971*, 1974*, 1981*, 1983*, 1994*, 1995*, 1996*, 1997*, 2009, 2014, 2015, 2019, 2026

Conference tournament champions
- 2009, 2014, 2015, 2019, 2020, 2026

Conference regular-season champions
- North Central Conference: 1932, 1933, 1940, 1941, 1942, 1952, 1954, 1971, 1981, 1995; Summit: 2009, 2014, 2015, 2020, 2026

Uniforms
Home	Away	Alternate
- * at Division II level

The North Dakota State Bison men's basketball team is a part of the athletic program at North Dakota State University in Fargo, North Dakota, U.S. They are members of the NCAA Division I and have been part of The Summit League since May 2007. Home games are played at the Scheels Center which is located on the NDSU campus in Fargo, ND. The team shares conference rivalies with the South Dakota State Jackrabbits and North Dakota Fighting Hawks. The Bison men's head coach is David Richman.

On March 10, 2009, the Bison made their biggest comeback in school history with a 66–64 win over Oakland University to win the Summit League tournament championship and became the first team since Southwestern Louisiana (now Louisiana-Lafayette) in 1972 to advance to the NCAA Men's Division I Basketball Championship in their first year of eligibility. North Dakota State has appeared five times in the NCAA Division I men's basketball tournament, most recently in 2026.

== Head coaches ==
#	Name	Years	Record	Conference Titles	NCAA Berths
1	Gil Dobie	1906–1908	17–5	0	0
2	Paul Magoffin	1908–1909	11–4	0	0
3	Arthur Rueber	1909–1913	42–6	0	0
4	Howard Wood	1913–1915	22–4	0	0
5	Paul J. Davis	1915–1918	37–10	0	0
6	Curly Movold	1918–1919	9–5	0	0
7	Stanley Borleske	1919–1922	42–14	0	0
8	George Dewey	1922–1925	56–15	0	0
9	Ion Cortright	1925–1926	22–3	0	0
10	Leonard Saalwaechter	1926–1933	71–68	2	0
11	Robert A. Lowe	1933–1946	141–102	3	0
12	C. P. Reed	1946–1949	32–41	0	0
13	Chuck Bentson	1949–1965	169–207	2	0
14	Doug Cowman	1965–1968	33–41	0	0
15	Bud Belk	1968–1972	50–55	1	1
16	Marv Skaar	1972–1978	93–69	0	1
17	Erv Inniger	1978–1992	244–150	1	2
18	Tom Billeter	1992–1997	97–50	1	4
19	Ray Giacoletti	1997–2000	48–33	0	0
20	Greg McDermott	2000–2001	15–11	0	0
21	Tim Miles	2001–2007	99–71	0	0
22	Saul Phillips	2007–2014	134–84	2	2
23	David Richman	2014–Present	238–150	5	4
Overall		1906–2026 (120 years)	1722–1198		

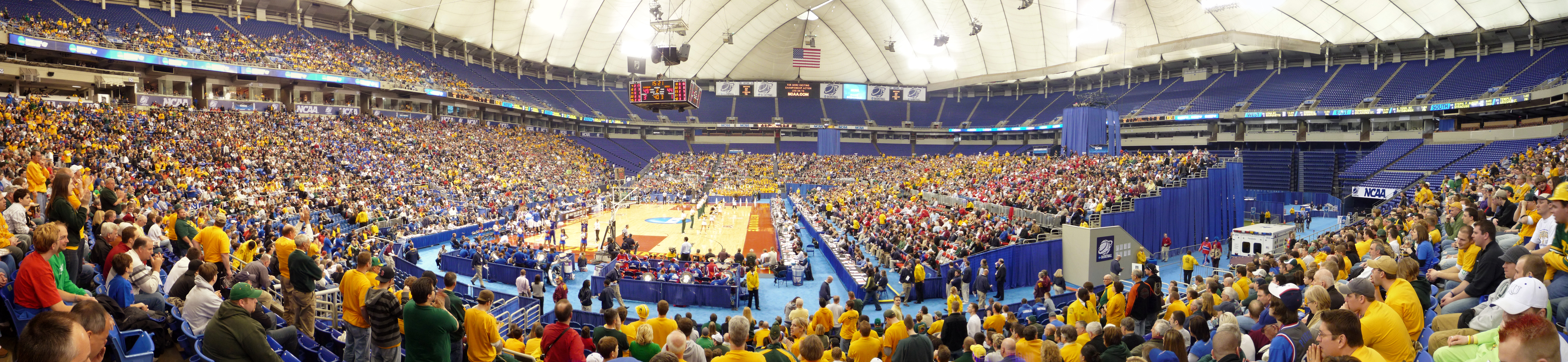
The 14th-seeded Bison played the defending national champion and 3rd-seeded Kansas Jayhawks in Round 1 of the 2009 NCAA Tournament, held in Minneapolis, Minnesota. The game had an estimated 10,000 NDSU fans in attendance in the Bison 84–74 loss.

== Postseason history ==
=== NCAA Division I Tournament results ===
The Bison have appeared in five NCAA Division I Tournaments. Their combined record is 2–5. They qualified for the 2020 NCAA tournament, however, the tournament was cancelled amid the COVID-19 pandemic.

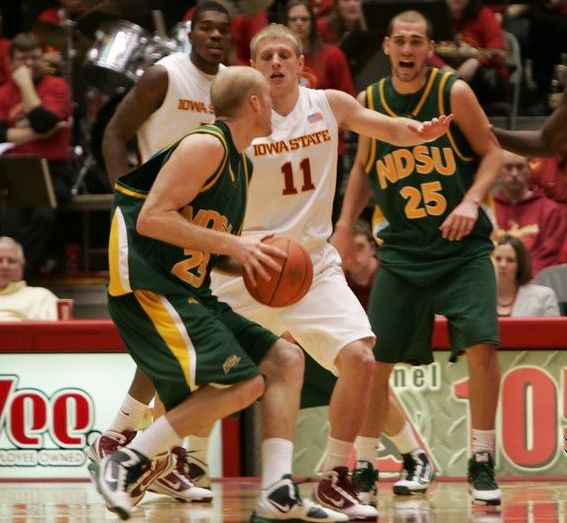
NDSU v Iowa State game in 2010

Year	Seed	Round	Opponent	Result
2009	#14	First Round	#3 Kansas	L 74–84
2014	#12	First Round; Second Round	#5 Oklahoma #4 San Diego State	W 80–75 ^{OT} L 44–63
2015	#15	First Round	#2 Gonzaga	L 76–86
2019	#16	First Four; First Round	#16 North Carolina Central #1 Duke	W 78–74; L 62–85
2026	#14	First Round	#3 Michigan State	L 67–92

From 2011–2015 the round of 64 was known as the second round, Round of 32 was Third round

=== NCAA Division II Tournament results ===
The Bison appeared in eight NCAA Division II Tournaments. Their combined record is 8–8.

Year	Round	Opponent	Result
1971	Regional semifinals Regional 3rd-place game	Northeast Missouri State; Saint Olaf	L 66–75; W 96–94
1974	Regional Quarterfinals	Saint Cloud State	L 62–77
1981	Regional semifinals Regional 3rd-place game	Green Bay; Central Missouri State	L 76–82; W 95–87
1983	Regional semifinals Regional Finals	Ferris State; Morningside	W 71–68; L 77–79
1994	Regional semifinals Regional Finals	Mesa State; South Dakota	W 75–65 ^{OT} L 58–61
1995	Regional Quarterfinals; Regional semifinals Regional 3rd-place game	Mesa State; Fort Hays State; Regis	W 85–76; L 63–73; W 84–72
1996	Regional Quarterfinals; Regional semifinals	Denver; South Dakota State	W 71–70; L 88–94
1997	Regional Quarterfinals; Regional semifinals	Northern State; Fort Hays State	W 90–89 ^{OT} L 78–82

=== CBI results ===
The Bison have appeared in two College Basketball Invitationals (CBI). Their combined record is 0–2.

Year	Round	Opponent	Result
2012	First round	Wyoming	L 75–76
2013	First round	Western Michigan	L 71–72 ^{OT}

== Summit League awards ==
=== Player of the Year ===
- Ben Woodside (2009)
- Taylor Braun (2014)
- Lawrence Alexander (2015)

=== First-Team All-Summit League ===
- Brett Winkelman (2008 & 2009)
- Ben Woodside (2008 & 2009)
- Taylor Braun (2012–14)
- Lawrence Alexander (2015)
- Paul Miller (2017)
- Vinnie Shahid (2020)
- Tyson Ward (2020)
- Rocky Kreuser (2021 & 2022)
- Sam Griesel (2022)
- Grant Nelson (2023)
- Jacksen Moni (2025)
- Trevian Carson (2026)

=== All-Defensive Team ===
- Tyree Eady (2022)
- Grant Nelson (2023)
- Trevian Carson (2026)

=== Newcomer of the Year ===
- Vinnie Shahid (2019)

=== Sixth Man of the Year ===
- Dexter Werner (2015 & 2017)
- Grant Nelson (2021)
- Tajavis Miller (2025)
- Noah Feddersen (2026)

== All-time statistical leaders ==
=== Single-game leaders ===
- Points: Ben Woodside (60, 2008)
- Assists: David Ryles (16, 1987)
- Rebounds: Gene Gamache (24, 1955), Robert Lauf (24, 1954), Roger Erickson (24, 1960)
- Steals: David Ryles (8, 1986)
- 3 point FG made: Jared Samuelson (9, 2018)
- Free Throws made: Ben Woodside (30, 2008)

=== Single-season leaders ===
- Points: Ben Woodside (766, 08–09)
- Assists: David Ryles (230, 86–87)
- Rebounds: John Wojtak (298, 70–71)
- Steals: David Ryles (86, 86–87)

=== Career leaders ===
- Points: Ben Woodside (2315, 05–09)
- Assists: Jeff Askew (684, 1979–83)
- Rebounds: Brett Winkelman (874, 05–09)
- Steals: David Ryles (275, 1983–87)

== Arenas ==
- Bentson Bunker Fieldhouse (Physical Education Building) 1931–1970
- Bison Sports Arena 1970–2016
- Scheels Center 2016-Present
