= South Dakota Coyotes men's basketball =

2026–27 South Dakota Coyotes men's basketball team
- University: University of South Dakota
- Head coach: Eric Peterson (5th season)
- Location: Vermillion, South Dakota
- Arena: Sanford Coyote Sports Center (capacity: 6,000)
- Conference: Summit League
- Nickname: Coyotes
- Colors: Red and white

NCAA Division I tournament champions
- 1958*
Other NCAA Division I tournament results
Final Four	1958*
Elite Eight	1957*, 1958*, 1993*, 1994*
Sweet Sixteen	1957*, 1958*, 1993*, 1994*, 2005*
Appearances	1957*, 1958*, 1972*, 1990*, 1993*, 1994*, 1999*, 2000*, 2004*, 2005*, 2006*, 2007*, 2008*

Conference tournament champions
- North Central: 2005, 2007 Great West: 2010

Conference regular-season champions
- North Central: 1930, 1931, 1939, 1957, 1958, 1972, 1993, 1994, 1999, 2000, 2001, 2007 Great West: 2010 Summit League: 2017

Uniforms
Home	Away
- * at Division II level

The South Dakota Coyotes men's basketball team represents the University of South Dakota in NCAA Division I basketball. They are currently members of the Summit League. They are led by head coach Eric Peterson and play their home games at the Sanford Coyote Sports Center. Prior to joining Division I beginning with the 2008–09 season, the Coyotes were members of NCAA Division II in the North Central Conference. They were Division II National Champions in 1958. South Dakota has never appeared in the NCAA Division I men's basketball tournament.

== Record year-by-year ==
Record table
Season	Team	Overall	Conference	Standing	Postseason
South Dakota (Division II) (North Central Conference) (19??–2008)
1988–89	South Dakota	17–15	9–9	5th	
1989–90	South Dakota	22–10	10–8	5th	NCAA Regional Third Place (D-II)
1990–91	South Dakota	20–10	9–9	T–5th	
1991–92	South Dakota	19–9	12–6	T–2nd	
1992–93	South Dakota	25–5	16–2	1st	NCAA Elite Eight (D-II)
1993–94	South Dakota	24–6	15–3	1st	NCAA Elite Eight (D-II)
1994–95	South Dakota	20–7	11–7	T–3rd	
1995–96	South Dakota	20–7	12–6	T–2nd	
1996–97	South Dakota	18–11	12–6	T–2nd	
1997–98	South Dakota	19–8	10–8	4th	
1998–99	South Dakota	23–6	14–4	1st	NCAA second round (D-II)
1999–00	South Dakota	22–6	13–5	1st	NCAA second round (D-II)
2000–01	South Dakota	22–6	14–4	1st	
2001–02	South Dakota	19–8	11–7	5th	
2002–03	South Dakota	19–9	8–8	T–5th	
2003–04	South Dakota	22–10	8–6	T–3rd	NCAA second round (D-II)
2004–05	South Dakota	27–6	8–4	2nd	NCAA Sweet Sixteen (D-II)
2005–06	South Dakota	20–10	7–5	3rd	NCAA first round (D-II)
2006–07	South Dakota	23–7	10–2	T–1st	NCAA first round (D-II)
2007–08	South Dakota	22–7	7–5	3rd	NCAA first round (D-II)
South Dakota (Division I) (Independent) (2008–2009)
2008–09	South Dakota	20–9			
South Dakota (Great West Conference) (2008–2011)
2009–10	South Dakota	22–10	11–1	1st	CIT first round
2010–11	South Dakota	18–15	7–5	4th	
South Dakota (The Summit League) (2011–present)
2011–12	South Dakota	10–18	5–13	T–8th	
2012–13	South Dakota	10–20	5–11	T–7th	
2013–14	South Dakota	12–18	6–8	5th	
2014–15	South Dakota	17–16	9–7	5th	
2015–16	South Dakota	14–18	5–11	8th	
2016–17	South Dakota	22–12	12–4	1st	NIT first round
2017–18	South Dakota	26–9	11–3	2nd	CBI first round
2018–19	South Dakota	13–17	7–9	T–5th	
Division I record:		164–153 (.517)	78–72 (.520)		
Total:		1,323–1,098 (.546) (through 2018–19)			
National champion Postseason invitational champion Conference regular season champion Conference regular season and conference tournament champion Division regular season champion Division regular season and conference tournament champion Conference tournament champion

== Postseason ==
=== NCAA Division II Tournament results ===
The Coyotes have appeared in 13 NCAA Division II Tournaments. Their combined record is 17–12. The Coyotes won the NCAA Division II National Championship in 1958.

Year	Round	Opponent	Result
1957	Regional semifinals Regional Finals; Elite Eight	Monmouth (IL); Jackson State†; Wheaton	W 62–52; W 2–0†; L 80–90
1958	Regional semifinals Regional Finals; Elite Eight; Final Four; National Championship Game	Wartburg; Knox; Southwest Missouri State; Wheaton; Saint Michael's	W 67–65; W 102–51; W 63–58; W 64–60; W 75–53
1972	Regional semifinals Regional 3rd Place	Missouri-Saint Louis; Saint Olaf	L 72–114; W 113–91
1990	Regional semifinals Regional 3rd Place	Metropolitan State; Alaska-Anchorage	L 73–82; W 101–92
1993	Regional semifinals Regional Finals; Elite Eight	Colorado Christian; North Dakota; New Hampshire College	W 78–60; W 66–64 ^{OT} L 96–100 ^{3OT}
1994	Regional semifinals Regional Finals; Elite Eight	North Dakota; North Dakota State; Southern Indiana	W 94–76; W 61–58; L 77–98
1999	Regional Quarterfinals; Regional semifinals	Mesa State; Metropolitan State	W 79–74; L 69–83
2000	Regional semifinals	Wayne State	L 73–76
2004	Regional Quarterfinals; Regional semifinals	Nebraska-Omaha; Nebraska-Kearney	W 82–71; L 80–96
2005	Regional Quarterfinals; Regional semifinals Regional Finals	Nebraska-Kearney; Winona State; Metropolitan State	W 94–84; W 73–68; L 84–89
2006	Regional Quarterfinals	Winona State	L 69–81
2007	Regional Quarterfinals	Nebraska-Kearney	L 91–95
2008	Regional Quarterfinals	Northern State	L 69–70

† - Jackson State, citing policy of the Mississippi Board of Trustees, was compelled to withdraw from the Tournament rather than competing in an interracial contest. This would be the only time such an occurrence would directly mar the tournament, and Jackson State themselves would return to the Tournament in 1964.

=== NAIA Tournament results ===
The Coyotes have appeared in one NAIA tournament. Their record is 0–1.

Year	Round	Opponent	Result
1950	First round	East Texas State	L 54–55

=== NIT results ===
The Coyotes have appeared in one National Invitation Tournament (NIT). Their record is 0–1.

Year	Round	Opponent	Result
2017	First round	Iowa	L 75–87

=== CIT results ===
The Coyotes have appeared in one CollegeInsider.com Postseason Tournament (CIT). Their record is 0–1.

Year	Round	Opponent	Result
2010	First round	Creighton	L 78–89

=== CBI results ===
The Coyotes have appeared in the College Basketball Invitational (CBI) one time. Their record is 0–1.

Year	Round	Opponent	Result
2018	First round	North Texas	L 77–90

== Draft history ==
- 1 total NBA draft pick.

Regular Draft

Year	Round	Pick	Overall	Player	Team
1973	5	4	73	Chuck Iverson	Seattle SuperSonics
