= Oral Roberts Golden Eagles men's basketball statistical leaders =

The Oral Roberts Golden Eagles men's basketball statistical leaders are individual statistical leaders of the Oral Roberts Golden Eagles men's basketball program in various categories, including points, three-pointers, assists, blocks, rebounds, and steals. Within those areas, the lists identify single-game, single-season, and career leaders. The Golden Eagles represent Oral Roberts University in the NCAA's Summit League.

Oral Roberts began competing in intercollegiate basketball in 1965. The NCAA did not officially record assists as a stat until the 1983–84 season, and blocks and steals until the 1985–86 season, but Oral Roberts's record books includes players in these stats before these seasons. These lists are updated through the end of the 2020–21 season.

== Scoring ==
Career
Rk	Player	Points	Seasons
1	Greg Sutton	3,070	1988–89 1989–90 1990–91
2	Richard Fuqua	3,004	1969–70 1970–71 1971–72 1972–73
3	Max Abmas	2,562	2019–20 2020–21 2021–22 2022–23
4	Caleb Green	2,503	2003–04 2004–05 2005–06 2006–07
5	Anthony Roberts	2,341	1973–74 1974–75 1975–76 1976–77
6	Dominique Morrison	2,080	2008–09 2009–10 2010–11 2011–12
7	Mark Acres	2,038	1981–82 1982–83 1983–84 1984–85
8	Ken Tutt	2,019	2003–04 2004–05 2005–06 2006–07
9	Warren Niles	1,984	2009–10 2010–11 2011–12 2012–13
10	Issac McBride	1,966	2021–22 2022–23 2023–24 2024–25

Season
Rk	Player	Points	Season
1	Greg Sutton	1,256	1989–90
2	Greg Sutton	1,200	1990–91
3	Richard Fuqua	1,006	1971–72
4	Anthony Roberts	951	1976–77
5	Richard Fuqua	826	1970–71
6	Max Abmas	743	2022–23
7	Shawn Glover	703	2013–14
8	Caleb Green	698	2006–07
9	Sam McCants	697	1973–74
10	Ray Thompson	688	1991–92

Single game
Rk	Player	Points	Season	Opponent
1	Greg Sutton	68	1990–91	Oklahoma City
2	Anthony Roberts	66	1976–77	North Carolina A&T
3	Anthony Roberts	65	1976–77	Oregon
4	Richard Fuqua	60	1970–71	University of the South
5	Richard Fuqua	57	1970–71	St. Benedict
6	Greg Sutton	54	1989–90	Arkansas Tech
7	Ray Thompson	52	1991–92	Prairie View A&M
8	Richard Fuqua	51	1970–71	Jackson St.
	Richard Fuqua	51	1971–72	Union (TN)
	Richard Fuqua	51	1971–72	Moorhead (MN) St.

== Rebounds ==
Career
Rk	Player	Rebounds	Seasons
1	Eddie Woods	1,365	1970–71 1971–72 1972–73 1973–74
2	Caleb Green	1,189	2003–04 2004–05 2005–06 2006–07
3	Mark Acres	1,051	1981–82 1982–83 1983–84 1984–85
4	Rocky Walls	946	1994–95 1995–96 1996–97 1997–98
5	Emmanuel Nzekwesi	889	2016–17 2017–18 2018–19 2019–20
6	Damen Bell-Holter	878	2009–10 2010–11 2011–12 2012–13
7	Antonio Martin	857	1977–78 1978–79 1979–80
8	Anthony Roberts	800	1973–74 1974–75 1975–76 1976–77
9	Jeff Acres	797	1980–81 1981–82 1982–83 1983–84 1984–85
10	Carl Hardaway	750	1966–67 1967–68 1968–69 1969–70

Season
Rk	Player	Rebounds	Season
1	Eddie Woods	407	1971–72
2	David Vaughn	385	1972–73
3	Eddie Woods	339	1970–71
4	Antonio Martin	334	1979–80
5	Damen Bell-Holter	328	2012–13
6	Eddie Woods	327	1973–74
7	Rocky Walls	325	1997–98
8	Mark Acres	324	1983–84
9	Caleb Green	315	2006–07
10	Caleb Green	306	2004–05

Single game
Rk	Player	Rebounds	Season	Opponent
1	David Vaughn	34	1972–73	Brandeis
2	Eddie Woods	30	1971–72	Lamar
3	Eddie Woods	28	1973–74	Lamar
4	Eddie Woods	24	1973–74	UT-Pan American
	Eddie Woods	24	1971–72	St. Francis (Pa.)
6	Caleb Green	22	2003–04	Southern Utah
7	Mark Acres	21	1983–84	Tulsa
	Antonio Martin	21	1977–78	West Texas St.
	Eddie Woods	21	1971–72	St. Johns
	Eddie Woods	21	1971–72	Boston
	Eddie Woods	21	1971–72	Connecticut
	Rocky Walls	21	1997–98	Southern Utah
	D'Mauria Jones	21	2020–21	Bacone

== Assists ==
Career
Rk	Player	Assists	Seasons
1	Luke Spencer-Gardner	534	2000–01 2001–02 2002–03 2004–05
2	Jonathan Bluitt	509	2002–03 2003–04 2004–05 2005–06
3	Arnold Dugger	501	1974–75 1975–76 1976–77
4	Greg Sutton	490	1988–89 1989–90 1990–91
5	Gary Johnson	481	1978–79 1979–80 1980–81 1981–82
6	Earl McClellan	413	1993–94 1994–95 1995–96 1996–97
7	Max Abmas	396	2019–20 2020–21 2021–22 2022–23
8	Willie Irons	393	1984–85 1985–86 1986–87 1987–88
9	Eric Perry	383	1996–97 1997–98 1998–99 1999–00
10	Tim Gill	377	1994–95 1995–96 1996–97 1997–98

Season
Rk	Player	Assists	Season
1	Sam McCants	208	1973–74
2	Arnold Dugger	194	1976–77
3	Haywoode Workman	188	1986–87
4	Jonathan Bluitt	178	2004–05
5	Arnold Dugger	166	1974–75
6	Jonathan Bluitt	165	2003–04
7	Luke Spencer-Gardner	164	2002–03
8	Gary Johnson	160	1981–82
9	Gary Johnson	158	1980–81
10	Luke Spencer-Gardner	156	2001–02

Single game
Rk	Player	Assists	Season	Opponent
1	Jonathan Bluitt	16	2004–05	Oakland
2	Haywoode Workman	15	1986–87	St. Louis
	Arnold Dugger	15	1976–77	Florida St.
4	Arnold Dugger	14	1976–77	North Texas
	Willie Irons	14	1985–86	BYU
6	Richard Fuqua	13	1972–73	UT-Pan American
	Ron Jones	13	1976–77	Illinois St.
	Robert Griffin	13	1978–79	Stetson
	Jonathan Bluitt	13	2003–04	UMKC

== Steals ==
Career
Rk	Player	Steals	Seasons
1	Haywoode Workman	250	1986–87 1987–88 1988–89
2	Earl McClellan	215	1993–94 1994–95 1995–96 1996–97
3	Greg Sutton	213	1988–89 1989–90 1990–91
4	Tim Gill	172	1994–95 1995–96 1996–97 1997–98
5	Rocky Walls	166	1994–95 1995–96 1996–97 1997–98
6	Caleb Green	164	2003–04 2004–05 2005–06 2006–07
7	Gary Johnson	163	1978–79 1979–80 1980–81 1981–82
8	Willie Irons	157	1984–85 1985–86 1986–87 1987–88
9	Mark Acres	150	1981–82 1982–83 1983–84 1984–85
	Akin Akin-Otiko	150	1983–84 1984–85 1985–86 1986–87
	Kareem Thompson	150	2020–21 2021–22 2022–23 2023–24

Season
Rk	Player	Steals	Season
1	Haywoode Workman	103	1987–88
2	Haywoode Workman	93	1988–89
3	Greg Sutton	88	1989–90
4	Greg Sutton	81	1990–91
5	Earl McClellan	77	1996–97
6	Akin Akin-Otiko	72	1986–87
7	Sebastian Neal	68	1991–92
8	Gary Johnson	63	1981–82
9	Earl McClellan	62	1995–96
10	Larry Owens	58	2004–05

Single game
Rk	Player	Steals	Season	Opponent
1	Haywoode Workman	9	1988–89	Oklahoma
	Haywoode Workman	9	1988–89	South Carolina
	R.J. Fuqua	9	2017–18	Avila
4	Obi Emegano	8	2014–15	Haskell
5	Willie Irons	7	1986–87	Coppin State
	Akin Akin-Otiko	7	1986–87	Texas
	Tim Gill	7	1995–96	John Brown
	Larry Owens	7	2005–06	Tulsa
9	Arnold Dugger	6	1974–75	Bowling Green
	Michael Craion	6	2011–12	West Virginia
	Gary Johnson	6	1979–80	Portland State

== Blocks ==
Career
Rk	Player	Blocks	Seasons
1	Kendrick Moore	197	2001–02 2002–03
2	Mark Acres	164	1981–82 1982–83 1983–84 1984–85
3	Albert Owens	159	2014–15 2015–16 2016–17 2017–18
4	Shawn King	149	2006–07 2007–08
5	Damen Bell-Holter	139	2009–10 2010–11 2011–12 2012–13
6	Alvin Scott	131	1973–74 1974–75 1975–76 1976–77
7	Rocky Walls	127	1994–95 1995–96 1996–97 1997–98
8	DeShang Weaver	123	2020–21 2021–22 2022–23 2023–24
9	Connor Vanover	110	2022–23
10	Antonio Martin	106	1977–78 1978–79 1979–80

Season
Rk	Player	Blocks	Season
1	Connor Vanover	110	2022–23
2	Kendrick Moore	103	2001–02
3	Kendrick Moore	94	2002–03
4	Alvin Scott	81	1976–77
5	Shawn King	81	2006–07
6	Shawn King	68	2007–08
7	Rocky Walls	58	1997–98
8	Mark Acres	54	1982–83
	Marvin Washington	54	1987–88
10	Shawn Glover	53	2013–14

Single game
Rk	Player	Blocks	Season	Opponent
1	Kendrick Moore	9	2002–03	Stephen F. Austin
	Kendrick Moore	9	2001–02	IUPUI
	Antonio Martin	9	1977–78	Oklahoma City
	Alvin Scott	9	1976–77	West Texas State
5	DeShang Weaver	8	2023–24	UT Arlington
	Connor Vanover	8	2022–23	Western Illinois
	Connor Vanover	8	2022–23	John Brown
	Shawn Glover	8	2013–14	New Orleans
	Kendrick Moore	8	2002–03	Wichita State
10	David Vaughn	7	1972–73	Trinity
	Shawn King	7	2007–08	Fort Wayne
	Albert Owens	7	2017–18	Oakland
	Connor Vanover	7	2022–23	Oklahoma Baptist
	Connor Vanover	7	2022–23	Omaha
	Connor Dow	7	2025–26	Oklahoma State
