= List of New Mexico State Aggies men's basketball head coaches =

The following is a list of New Mexico State Aggies men's basketball head coaches. There have been 28 head coaches of the Aggies in their 118-season history.

New Mexico State's current head coach is Jason Hooten. He was hired as the Aggies' head coach in March 2023, replacing Greg Heiar, who was fired on February 14, 2023 amidst a hazing scandal within the team.

No.	Tenure	Coach	Years	Record	Pct.
–	1904–1906	No coach	2	0–2–1	.167
1	1906–1908	John O. Miller	2	0–2	.000
2	1908–1909	V. Kays	1	7–2	.778
3	1909–1910	George Lain	1	3–5	.375
4	1910–1913	Art Badenoch	3	3–22	.120
5	1914–1917	Clarence W. Russell	3	19–12	.613
6	1917–1920	John G. Griffith	3	20–9	.690
7	1920–1922	Dutch Bergman	2	12–5	.706
8	1922–1926	R. R. Brown	4	48–31	.608
9	1926–1927	Arthur Burkholder	1	6–13	.316
10	1927–1929	Ted R. Coffman	2	9–20–1	.317
11	1929–1940; 1946–1947	Jerry Hines	12	157–102	.606
12	1940–1942	Julius H. Johnston	2	22–30	.423
13	1944–1946	Kermit Laabs	2	14–21	.400
14	1947–1949	John Gunn	2	21–26	.447
15	1949–1953	George McCarty	4	65–55	.542
16	1953–1965	Presley Askew	12	136–147	.481
17	1965–1966	Jim McGregor	1	4–22	.154
18	1966–1975; 1997–2005 (Note: New Mexico State vacated the entire 1997–98 season. Henson's on-court record is 307–164 (.652).) (Note: Henson retired in January 2005 due to declining health. Tony Stubblefield serves as interim head coach for the remainder of the 2004–05 season.)	Lou Henson	17	289–152	.655
19	1975–1979	Ken Hayes	4	69–46	.600
20	1979–1985	Weldon Drew	6	82–84	.494
21	1985–1997 (Note: New Mexico State vacated three NCAA tournament appearances from 1992 through 1994, and all 28 games of the 1997–98 season. McCarthy's on-court record is 248–123 (.668).)	Neil McCarthy	12	226–111	.671
22	2005*	Tony Stubblefield	1	2–12	.143
23	2005–2007	Reggie Theus	2	41–23	.641
24	2007–2016	Marvin Menzies	9	199–111	.642
25	2016–2017	Paul Weir	1	28–6	.824
26	2017–2022	Chris Jans	5	122–32	.792
27	2022–2023 (Note: New Mexico State suspended their 2022–23 season in February 2023 after allegations of hazing and sexual contact within the program. Days later, the university cancelled the remainder of the season and fired Heiar.)	Greg Heiar	1	9–15	.375
28	2023–present	Jason Hooten	0	0–0	–
Totals		28 coaches	118 seasons	1,613–1,125–2	.589
Records updated through end of 2022–23 season * - Denotes interim head coach. Source
