= List of Oral Roberts Golden Eagles men's basketball head coaches =

The following is a list of Oral Roberts Golden Eagles men's basketball head coaches. There have been 12 head coaches of the Golden Eagles in their 58-season history.

Oral Roberts' current head coach is Russell Springmann. He was hired as the Golden Eagles' head coach in March 2023, replacing Paul Mills, who left to become the head coach at Wichita State.

No.	Tenure	Coach	Years	Record	Pct.
1	1965–1969	Bill White	4	65–35	.650
2	1969–1974; 1987–1993	Ken Trickey	11	214–116	.648
3	1974–1977	Jerry Hale	3	61–21	.744
4	1977–1979	Lake Kelly	2	30–24	.556
5	1979–1982 (Note: Hayes was fired on December 18, 1982. Dick Acres served as interim head coach for the remainder of the 1982–83 season.)	Ken Hayes	4	50–43	.538
6	1982–1985 (Note: After finishing the 1982–83 season as interim head coach, Acres was named permanent head coach.)	Dick Acres	3	47–34	.580
7	1985–1987	Ted Owens	2	21–35	.375
8	1993–1997	Bill Self	4	55–54	.505
9	1997–1999	Barry Hinson	2	36–23	.610
10	1999–2017	Scott Sutton	18	328–247	.570
11	2017–2023	Paul Mills	6	106–84	.558
12	2023–present	Russell Springmann	0	0–0	–
Totals		12 coaches	58 seasons	1,013–725	.583
Records updated through end of 2022–23 season Source
