= Acres (surname) =

Acres is an English surname. Notable people with the surname include:

- Adam Acres (1878–1955), Canadian politician
- Ava Acres (born 2005), American actress
- Basil Acres (1926–2000), English footballer
- Birt Acres (1854–1918), American photographer and film pioneer
- Blake Acres (born 1995), Australian rules footballer
- Dick Acres (1934–2012), American college basketball coach
- Harry Acres (1897–1968), British film score composer
- Isabella Acres (born 2001), American actress
- Mark Acres (born 1962), American basketball player

Fictional characters:

- Bob Acres, a character in The Rivals

== See also ==
- Acre (surname)
