= 1983–84 Oral Roberts Titans basketball team =

American college basketball season

1983–84 Oral Roberts Titans men's basketball

Midwestern City tournament champions Midwestern City Regular Season champions

NCAA tournament, First round
- Conference: Midwestern City Conference
- Record: 21–10 (11–3 MCC)
- Head coach: Dick Acres (2nd season)
- Home arena: Mabee Center

1983–84 Midwestern City Conference men's basketball standings
	Conf.				Overall
Team	W		L	PCT	W		L	PCT
Oral Roberts †	11	–	3	.786	21	–	10	.677
Loyola-Chicago	10	–	4	.714	20	–	9	.690
Xavier	9	–	5	.643	22	–	11	.667
Butler	7	–	7	.500	13	–	15	.464
Evansville	7	–	7	.500	15	–	14	.517
Saint Louis	5	–	9	.357	12	–	16	.429
Detroit	4	–	10	.286	8	–	20	.286
Oklahoma City	3	–	11	.214	8	–	19	.296
† 1984 MCC tournament winner

The 1983–84 Oral Roberts Titans men's basketball team represented Oral Roberts University during the 1983–84 NCAA Division I men's basketball season. The Titans, led by second-year head coach Dick Acres, played their home games at the Mabee Center and were members of the Midwestern City Conference. They finished the season 21–10, 11–3 in MCC play to be crowned regular season champions. They won the Midwestern City tournament to receive an automatic bid to the NCAA tournament as No. 11 seed in the Midwest region. The Titans lost to No. 6 seed Memphis State in the opening round.

== Roster ==
1983–84 Oral Roberts Golden Eagles men's basketball team
Players
Coaches

Pos.	#	Name	Height	Weight	Year	Previous school	Hometown
G	10	Butch Berry	5 ft 10 in (1.78 m)	—	Jr		Wichita, Kansas
F	20	Kip Brown	6 ft 5 in (1.96 m)	—	Fr		Los Angeles, California
F	21	Jeff Acres	6 ft 9 in (2.06 m)	—	RS Jr	Palos Verdes HS	Inglewood, California
C	42	Mark Acres	6 ft 11 in (2.11 m)	220 lb (100 kg)	Jr	Palos Verdes HS	Inglewood, California

Head coach

- Dick Acres (UC Santa Barbara)

Assistant coach(es)

Legend

- (C) Team captain
- (S) Suspended
- (I) Ineligible
- (W) Walk-on
- Injured
- Current redshirt

Roster

== Schedule and results ==
Date time, TV	Rank^{#}	Opponent^{#}	Result	Record	Site (attendance) city, state
Exhibition
Regular season
Nov 29, 1983*		at Kansas State	L 74–82	0–1	Ahearn Field House; Manhattan, Kansas
Dec 1, 1983*		at Tulsa	L 81–87	0–2	Tulsa Convention Center; Tulsa, Oklahoma
Dec 5, 1983*		Oklahoma State	W 62–61	1–2	Mabee Center; Tulsa, Oklahoma
Dec 10, 1983*		Texas A&M	W 84–66	2–2	Mabee Center; Tulsa, Oklahoma
Dec 12, 1983*		Seattle Pacific	W 94–89	3–2	Mabee Center; Tulsa, Oklahoma
Dec 17, 1983*		at Texas	W 74–59	4–2	Frank Erwin Center; Austin, Texas
Dec 19, 1983*		at Kansas	L 64–65	4–3	Allen Fieldhouse; Lawrence, Kansas
Dec 27, 1983*		at San Diego State	L 75–85 ^{OT}	4–4	San Diego Sports Arena; San Diego, California
Dec 30, 1983*		at Bradley	L 52–70	4–5	Carver Arena; Peoria, Illinois
Jan 3, 1984*		Texas–Arlington	W 114–87	5–5	Mabee Center; Tulsa, Oklahoma
Jan 3, 1984*		Abilene Christian	W 105–80	6–5	Mabee Center; Tulsa, Oklahoma
Jan 7, 1984		at Saint Louis	W 79–73	7–5 (1–0)	Kiel Auditorium; St. Louis, Missouri
Jan 9, 1984		at Evansville	W 103–90	8–5 (2–0)	Roberts Stadium; Evansville, Indiana
Jan 12, 1984*		No. 20 Tulsa	L 78–84	8–6	Mabee Center; Tulsa, Oklahoma
Jan 16, 1984		at Oklahoma City	W 82–80	9–6 (3–0)	Frederickson Fieldhouse; Oklahoma City, Oklahoma
Jan 21, 1984		Xavier	L 87–89	9–7 (3–1)	Mabee Center; Tulsa, Oklahoma
Jan 23, 1984		Butler	W 82–68	10–7 (4–1)	Mabee Center; Tulsa, Oklahoma
Jan 28, 1984		at Detroit	W 80–76	11–7 (5–1)	Calihan Hall; Detroit, Michigan
Jan 30, 1984		at Loyola–Chicago	W 87–82	12–7 (6–1)	Alumni Gym; Chicago, Illinois
Feb 4, 1984		Saint Louis	W 72–61	13–7 (7–1)	Mabee Center; Tulsa, Oklahoma
Feb 6, 1984		Evansville	W 88–75	14–7 (8–1)	Mabee Center; Tulsa, Oklahoma
Feb 11, 1984		Oklahoma City	W 92–83	15–7 (9–1)	Mabee Center; Tulsa, Oklahoma
Feb 16, 1984*		Southwest Missouri State	W 68–63	16–7	Mabee Center; Tulsa, Oklahoma
Feb 18, 1984		at Xavier	L 76–78	16–8 (9–2)	Cincinnati Gardens; Cincinnati, Ohio
Feb 20, 1984		at Butler	W 105–100	17–8 (10–2)	Hinkle Fieldhouse; Indianapolis, Indiana
Feb 25, 1984		Detroit	W 104–75	18–8 (11–2)	Mabee Center; Tulsa, Oklahoma
Feb 27, 1984		Loyola–Chicago	L 76–82	18–9 (11–3)	Mabee Center; Tulsa, Oklahoma
MCC tournament
Mar 8, 1984*		vs. Oklahoma City; Quarterfinals	W 79–78	19–9	UIC Pavilion; Chicago, Illinois
Mar 9, 1984*		vs. Evansville; Semifinals	W 101–91	20–9	UIC Pavilion; Chicago, Illinois
Mar 10, 1984*		vs. Xavier; Championship game	W 68–66	21–9	UIC Pavilion; Chicago, Illinois
NCAA tournament
Mar 15, 1984*	(11 MW)	vs. (6 MW) No. 16 Memphis State; First round	L 83–92	21–10	Mid-South Coliseum; Memphis, Tennessee
*Non-conference game. ^{#}Rankings from AP poll. (#) Tournament seedings in parentheses. S=South. All times are in Central Time.
