= 1984 Midwestern City Conference men's basketball tournament =

- Classification: Division I
- Season: 1983–84
- Teams: 8
- Site: UIC Pavilion; Chicago, Illinois
- Champions: Oral Roberts (2nd title)
- Winning coach: Dick Acres (1st title)
- MVP: Sam Potter (Oral Roberts)
- Midwestern City Conference men's basketball tournaments

1983–84 Midwestern City Conference men's basketball standings
	Conf.				Overall
Team	W		L	PCT	W		L	PCT
Oral Roberts †	11	–	3	.786	21	–	10	.677
Loyola-Chicago	10	–	4	.714	20	–	9	.690
Xavier	9	–	5	.643	22	–	11	.667
Butler	7	–	7	.500	13	–	15	.464
Evansville	7	–	7	.500	15	–	14	.517
Saint Louis	5	–	9	.357	12	–	16	.429
Detroit	4	–	10	.286	8	–	20	.286
Oklahoma City	3	–	11	.214	8	–	19	.296
† 1984 MCC tournament winner

The 1984 Midwestern City Conference men's basketball tournament (now known as the Horizon League men's basketball tournament) was held March 8–10 at UIC Pavilion in Chicago, Illinois.

Oral Roberts defeated Xavier in the championship game, 68–66, to win their first MCC/Horizon League men's basketball tournament.

The Golden Eagles received an automatic bid to the 1984 NCAA tournament as the #11 seed in the Midwest region.

== Format ==
All eight conference members participated in the tournament and were seeded based on regular season conference records.

== Bracket ==
Quarterfinals; Friday, March 8
1	Oral Roberts	79
8	Oklahoma City	78
4	Evansville	70
5	Butler	65
3	Xavier	72
6	Saint Louis	60
7	Detroit	84
2	Loyola–Chicago	88

Semifinals; Saturday, March 9
1	Oral Roberts	101
4	Evansville	91
3	Xavier	80
2	Loyola–Chicago	69

Championship; Sunday, March 10
1	Oral Roberts	68
3	Xavier	66
