= Acre (surname) =

Acre is a surname. Notable people with the surname include:

- Billy White Acre, Canadian film score composer, singer-songwriter, guitarist and record producer
- Mark Acre (born 1968), American baseball player
- Raynold E. Acre (1889–1966), American aviator

== See also ==
- Acre (disambiguation)
- Acres (surname)
