= Weldon Drew =

American basketball coach

Biographical details
- Born: April 22, 1935
- Died: November 22, 2012 (aged 77); Stillwater, Oklahoma, U.S.
- Education: Fisk University (1957); Texas Southern University

Coaching career (HC unless noted)
- 1957–1975: Kashmere HS
- 1975–1979: New Mexico State (asst.)
- 1979–1985: New Mexico State
- 1985–1987: Oklahoma State (asst.)
- 1987–1999: Langston

Accomplishments and honors

Championships
- 2× Texas 4A state championship (1974, 1975); High School national championship (1975)

Awards
- MVC Coach of the Year (1983)

Weldon Drew (April 22, 1935 – November 22, 2012) was the head men's basketball coach at New Mexico State University from 1979 to 1985. He was named to the position in 1979 as the successor to Ken Hayes who left to become head coach at Oral Roberts University. Drew was previously an assistant coach for New Mexico State University from 1975 to 1979. Drew came to NMSU after coaching high school basketball for Houston's Kashmere High School (485–135 record in 18 seasons), where he left with a 78-game winning streak after winning two consecutive Texas 4A state championships and the high school national championship. Drew also won national coach of the year in 1975. The NMSU job was Drew's first head coaching position at the college level. Drew was the 20th person to hold the head coaching position in the Aggie basketball history. After a dismal 1984–85 season, Drew was fired. He then went to be an assistant coach at Oklahoma State for two seasons. In 1987 Drew became the head coach at traditionally-black Langston University in Oklahoma. Drew graduated from Fisk University in 1957 after a standout career playing basketball. Drew graduated from Wheatley High School in Houston, where he played basketball.

Drew is widely cited for one of his basketball-related quotes – "We have a great bunch of outside shooters. Unfortunately, all our games are played indoors."

Drew died after an automobile accident near Stillwater, Oklahoma on November 22, 2012.

== Head coaching record ==
Record table
Season	Team	Overall	Conference	Standing	Postseason
New Mexico State Aggies (Missouri Valley Conference) (1979–1983)
1979–80	New Mexico State	17–10	8–8	T–5th	
1980–81	New Mexico State	10–17	7–9	T–6th	
1981–82	New Mexico State	17–11	10–6	4th	
1982–83	New Mexico State	18–11	11–7	T–3rd	
New Mexico State Aggies (Pacific Coast Athletic Association) (1983–1985)
1983–84	New Mexico State	13–15	9–9	5th	
1984–85	New Mexico State	7–20	4–14	9th	
New Mexico State:		82–84 (.494)	49–53 (.480)		
Total:		82–84 (.494)			
