= Chattanooga School for the Arts & Sciences =

Chattanooga School for the Arts and Sciences

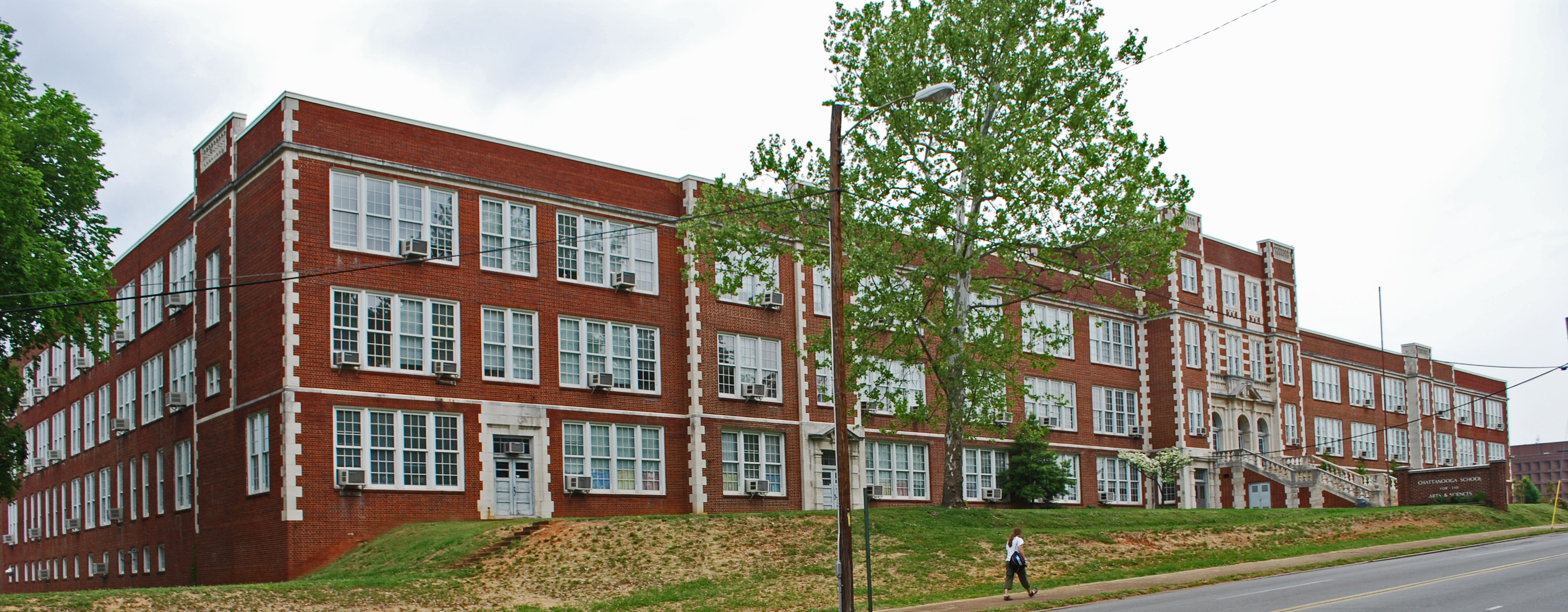
- The school in 2010

Location
- 865 East 3rd Street; Chattanooga, Tennessee; United States; 35.0502°N 85.2949°W

Information
- Type: Public Magnet School
- Established: 1986
- School district: Hamilton County Department of Education
- Principal: Christin Carlisle
- Grades: K–12
- Enrollment: 1,059
- Campus: Urban
- Mascot: The Patriots
- Website: https://csask12.hcde.org/
- Wyatt Hall
- U.S. National Register of Historic Places
- Area: 2.5 acres (1.0 ha)
- Built: 1920–1921
- Built by: George Beckham
- Architect: R. H. Hunt
- Architectural style: Georgian Revival
- MPS: Hunt, Reuben H., Buildings in Hamilton County TR
- NRHP reference No.: 86002897
- Added to NRHP: October 23, 1986

The Chattanooga School for the Arts & Sciences is a K–12 magnet school in Chattanooga, Tennessee. It was opened in 1986 in the former Wyatt Hall building which was used as a high school until 1983. The building was designed in Georgian Revival style by Reuben H. Hunt, a Chattanooga architect.

The building was constructed in 1920–1921 and added to the National Register of Historic Places in 1986 as Wyatt Hall. It was named for Professor Henry D. Wyatt, founder of the public school system in Chattanooga, a teacher and the first Superintendent of Schools.

Its liberal-arts curriculum is patterned on Mortimer Adler's Paideia philosophy. The physical building has been a school in several incarnations, and was once attended by Samuel L. Jackson (as Riverside High School).

It was also known as Chattanooga High School.
