= Oral Roberts–Tulsa basketball rivalry =

American college basketball rivalry

PSO Mayor's Cup: Tulsa-Oral Roberts basketball rivalry
- Tulsa Golden Hurricane Oral Roberts Golden Eagles
- Sport: College basketball
- First meeting: March 4, 1974; Tulsa 85, Oral Roberts 84
- Latest meeting: November 11, 2026; Tulsa 80, Oral Roberts 71
- Trophy: PSO Mayor's Cup

Statistics
- Total meetings: 61
- All-time series: Tulsa leads 39–22
- Largest victory: Oral Roberts, 106–62 (1976)
- Longest win streak: Tulsa, 13 (1980–1986)
- Current win streak: Tulsa, 3 (2024–present)

Locations of Tulsa and Oral Roberts

The Oral Roberts–Tulsa basketball rivalry is a college basketball rivalry game between cross-town rivals, the Tulsa Golden Hurricane and the Oral Roberts Golden Eagles. The two teams first played each other in 1974 and as of 2025 have played a total of 61 games. After the rivalry resumed in 2012, it was branded "PSO Mayor's Cup" with Public Service Company of Oklahoma (PSO) as its corporate sponsor.

== History ==
Tulsa University (TU) and Oral Roberts University (ORU) had their first meeting on March 4, 1974, which Tulsa won 85–84. The series has been hard fought since then, and TU holds the edge in the overall series 36–21. The rivalry has been marked by remarkable runs either way: Oral Roberts won 8 consecutive match-ups in the late 1970s; directly following that streak, TU won the next 13 in a row and 24 of 27 between December 8, 1980, and December 19, 2002. The rivalry has become more balanced this century, with TU leading a 9–8 edge over the past 17 meetings. The largest margin of victory was 45 points, by TU over ORU in 1994. Another turning point in the rivalry was TU's hiring of Bill Self away from ORU prior to the 1997–98 season.

The Tulsa and Oral Roberts Women's basketball teams have faced off in the series since 1976. The ORU Women's team has dominated, 30–7, including a 20-game streak from 1976 through 1999.

The cross-town basketball series has been called the "PSO Mayor’s Cup" since 2012, with Public Service Company of Oklahoma (PSO) serving as the title sponsor.

The 2014 PSO Mayor's Cup Men's game, held on November 15 at Oral Roberts' Mabee Center, was won by ORU by a score of 77–68, serving as the second straight win in the series by the Golden Eagles. The 2014 PSO Mayor's Cup Women's game, held on November 21, was also won by ORU by a score of 73–71.

Oral Roberts swept the PSO Mayor's Cup games again in 2015, this time at Tulsa's Reynolds Center, with the Golden Eagle women winning 59–53 on November 20, and the ORU men taking their third in a row in the series, 70–68 on December 5.

The series has seen three interruptions in its history: four seasons spanning 1987 to 1991 when Oral Roberts dropped to NAIA status; in 2010–11 when Tulsa would not agree to a date for the contracted game at ORU's Mabee Center, and 2020–21 when TU opted out of games at Arkansas and ORU due to COVID issues in the program.

== Game results ==
Tulsa victories	Oral Roberts victories

No.	Date	Location	Winner	Score
1	March 4, 1974	Tulsa Fairgrounds Pavilion	Tulsa	85–84
2	March 6, 1975	Mabee Center	Tulsa	91–83
3	December 10, 1975	Mabee Center	Oral Roberts	70–69
4	March 6, 1976	Tulsa Convention Center	Tulsa	87–78
5	December 2, 1976	Mabee Center	Oral Roberts	106–62
6	January 8, 1977	Tulsa Convention Center	Oral Roberts	80–62
7	December 15, 1977	Tulsa Convention Center	Oral Roberts	77–70
8	January 30, 1978	Mabee Center	Oral Roberts	56–54
9	December 14, 1978	Mabee Center	Oral Roberts	83–72
10	February 15, 1979	Tulsa Convention Center	Oral Roberts	91–86
11	December 20, 1979	Tulsa Convention Center	Oral Roberts	99–84
12	February 18, 1980	Mabee Center	Oral Roberts	88–86
13	December 8, 1980	Mabee Center	Tulsa	72–69
14	February 28, 1981	Tulsa Convention Center	Tulsa	81–70
15	December 12, 1981	Tulsa Convention Center	#14 Tulsa	80–63
16	February 25, 1982	Tulsa Convention Center	#8 Tulsa	91–70
17	December 18, 1982	Mabee Center	Tulsa	63–56
18	February 2, 1983	Mabee Center	Tulsa	101–71
19	December 1, 1983	Tulsa Convention Center	Tulsa	87–81
20	January 12, 1984	Mabee Center	#20 Tulsa	84–78
21	November 27, 1984	Mabee Center	Tulsa	86–82
22	January 14, 1985	Tulsa Convention Center	#20 Tulsa	71–61
23	December 19, 1985	Tulsa Convention Center	Tulsa	63–47
24	January 2, 1986	Mabee Center	Tulsa	81–65
25	December 2, 1986	Tulsa Convention Center	Tulsa	71–44
26	January 5, 1987	Mabee Center	Oral Roberts	59–55
27	February 17, 1992	Mabee Center	Tulsa	78–62
28	December 12, 1992	Tulsa Convention Center	Tulsa	104–81
29	January 25, 1993	Mabee Center	Tulsa	103–69
30	December 6, 1993	Mabee Center	Tulsa	94–74
31	December 10, 1994	Tulsa Convention Center	Tulsa	99–54

No.	Date	Location	Winner	Score
32	December 30, 1995	Mabee Center	Oral Roberts	90–78
33	January 11, 1997	Tulsa Convention Center	Tulsa	77–70
34	December 14, 1997	Mabee Center	Tulsa	58–53
35	December 13, 1998	Reynolds Center	Tulsa	73–68
36	December 11, 1999	Mabee Center	Oral Roberts	60–59
37	December 10, 2000	Reynolds Center	Tulsa	89–81^{OT}
38	December 1, 2001	Mabee Center	Tulsa	73–66^{OT}
39	December 19, 2002	Reynolds Center	#22 Tulsa	90–80
40	December 6, 2003	Mabee Center	Oral Roberts	87–81
41	December 5, 2004	Reynolds Center	Oral Roberts	70–47
42	December 3, 2005	Mabee Center	Oral Roberts	68–52
43	November 28, 2006	Reynolds Center	Tulsa	75–57
44	November 27, 2007	Mabee Center	Oral Roberts	84–70
45	November 15, 2008	Reynolds Center	Tulsa	50–43
46	January 20, 2010	Mabee Center	Tulsa	57–52
47	November 16, 2010	Reynolds Center	Tulsa	83–68
48	December 22, 2012	Mabee Center	Tulsa	72–68
49	November 10, 2013	Reynolds Center	Oral Roberts	74–68
50	November 15, 2014	Mabee Center	Oral Roberts	77–68
51	December 5, 2015	Reynolds Center	Oral Roberts	70–68
52	November 28, 2016	Mabee Center	Tulsa	79–65
53	November 13, 2017	Reynolds Center	Tulsa	90–71
54	December 22, 2018	Mabee Center	Tulsa	69–59
55	November 12, 2019	Reynolds Center	Tulsa	74–67
56	November 29, 2021	Mabee Center	Oral Roberts	87–80
57	December 3, 2022	Reynolds Center	Oral Roberts	77–66
58	December 2, 2023	Mabee Center	Oral Roberts	79–70
59	November 13, 2024	Reynolds Center	Tulsa	85–76
60	November 12, 2025	Mabee Center	Tulsa	88–87
61	November 11, 2026	Reynolds Center	Tulsa	80–71
Series: Tulsa leads 39–22
