= Kory Barnett =

American college basketball coach (born 1988)

Current position
- Title: Head coach
- Team: Oral Roberts
- Conference: Summit League
- Record: 10–23 (.303)

Biographical details
- Born: December 14, 1988 (age 37); Rochester, Indiana, U.S.

Playing career
- 2009–2012: Indiana

Coaching career (HC unless noted)
- 2012–2013: Indiana (graduate assistant)
- 2018–2019: UCLA (assistant)
- 2019–2024: Nevada (assistant)
- 2024–2025: West Virginia (assistant)
- 2025–present: Oral Roberts

Administrative career (AD unless noted)
- 2013–2017: UCLA (video coordinator)
- 2017–2018: UCLA (director of operations)

Head coaching record
- Overall: 10–23 (.303)

Kory Barnett is an American college basketball coach who is currently the head coach for the Oral Roberts Golden Eagles.

== Playing career ==
He committed to play college basketball for the Indiana Hoosiers, joining the team as a preferred walk-on. During his collegiate career, Barnett played in 49 games where he averaged 0.2 points, 0.2 rebounds, and 0.1 assists per game.

== Coaching career ==
Barnett got his first coaching job as a graduate assistant at his alma mater Indiana in 2012. In 2013, Barnett was hired by the UCLA Bruins where until 2019 in various roles as an assistant coach, director of operations, player development and scouting, and the video coordinator. Ahead of the 2019 season, Barnett was hired as an assistant coach for the Nevada Wolf Pack. In 2024, he joined the West Virginia Mountaineers as an assistant coach. On March 28, 2025, Barnett was hired as the next head coach for the Oral Roberts Golden Eagles.

== Head coaching record ==
Record table
Season	Team	Overall	Conference	Standing	Postseason
Oral Roberts (Summit League) (2025–present)
2025–26	Oral Roberts	10–23	4–12	8th	
2026–27	Oral Roberts	0–0	0–0		
Oral Roberts:		10–23 (.303)	4–12 (.250)		
Total:		10–23 (.303)			
National champion Postseason invitational champion Conference regular season champion Conference regular season and conference tournament champion Division regular season champion Division regular season and conference tournament champion Conference tournament champion
