= Damen Bell-Holter =

American basketball player (born 1990)

Personal information
- Born: April 13, 1990 (age 36) Hydaburg, Alaska, U.S.
- Listed height: 6 ft 9 in (2.06 m)
- Listed weight: 245 lb (111 kg)

Career information
- High school: Ketchikan (Ketchikan, Alaska)
- College: Oral Roberts (2009–2013)
- NBA draft: 2013: undrafted
- Playing career: 2013–2017
- Position: Power forward

Career history
- 2013–2014: Maine Red Claws
- 2014–2015: Pertevniyal S.K.
- 2015–2016: Lapuan Korikobrat
- 2016–2017: Fortitudo Agrigento

Career highlights
- First-team All-Southland (2013)

Damen Bell-Holter (born April 13, 1990) or Nangghaahlaangstangs from Hydaburg, Alaska is an American professional basketball player who played for Fortitudo Agrigento of the serie A2 and the Boston Celtics. An Alaska Native and Haida, he played college basketball at Oral Roberts University and now coaches youth across the Pacific Northwest. He is also of African-American descent. Bell-Holter often gives inspirational speeches and uses his personal and family experiences with depression, abuse, alcoholism and toxic masculinity to inspire others—particularly young men and indigenous youth.

== Professional ==
Bell-Holter went undrafted in the 2013 NBA draft. On August 7, 2013, he signed with Telekom Baskets Bonn of Germany for the 2013–14 season. However, he was later released by Bonn on August 28, 2013.

On September 30, 2013, he signed with the Boston Celtics. However, he was later waived by the Celtics on October 26, 2013, after playing in three pre-season games. On October 31, 2013, he was acquired by the Maine Red Claws as an affiliate player.

On July 29, 2014, he signed with BC Körmend of Hungary for the 2014–15 season. He later left before appearing in a game for them. On October 9, 2014, he signed with Pertevniyal İstanbul of the Turkish Basketball Second League.

On July 21, 2016, Bell-Holter signed with the Italian team Fortitudo Agrigento.
