= Riverside High School (Chattanooga, Tennessee) =

Building used by the Chattanooga School for the Arts and Sciences - Upper School

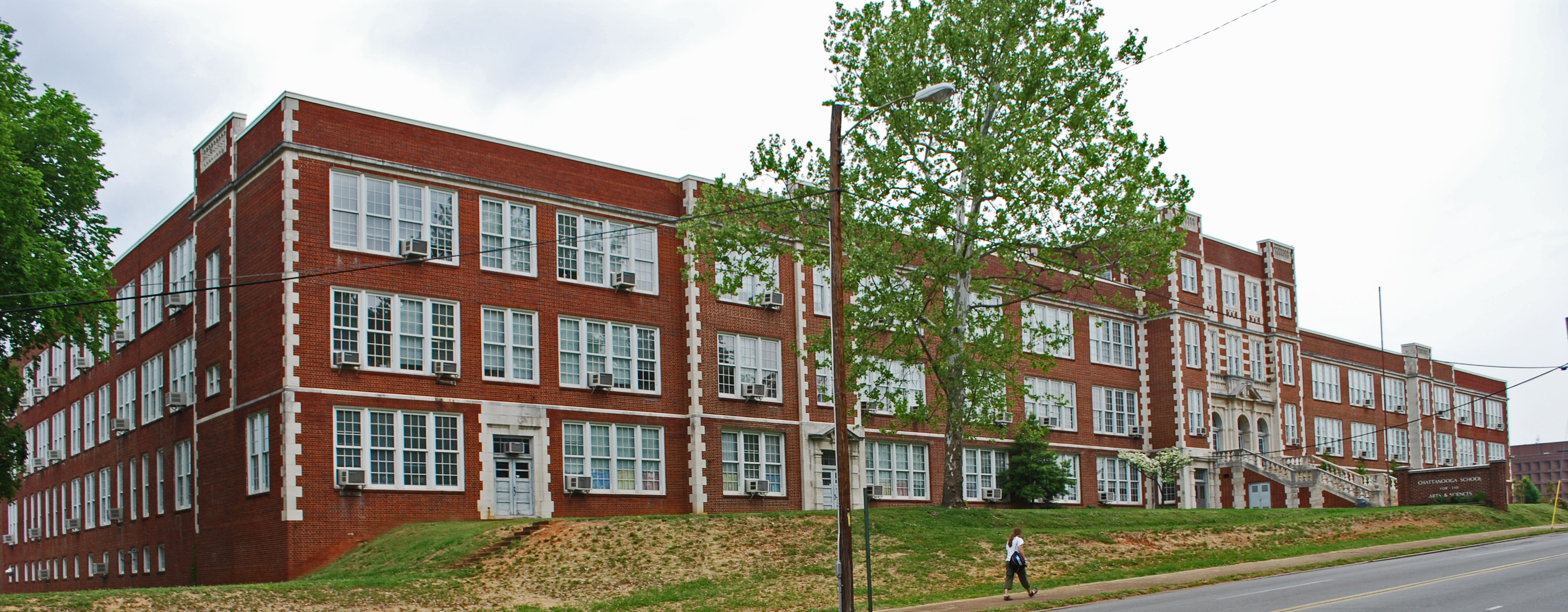
- The building of the former Riverside High School in 2010

Location
- 865 East 3rd Street; Chattanooga, Tennessee
- 35.0502°N 85.2949°W

Information
- Type: Public High School
- Established: 1963
- Closed: 1983
- Yearbook: The Trojanaire

Riverside High School was a public high school in Chattanooga, Tennessee, operating from 1963 - 1983. Its building currently houses the Chattanooga School for the Arts and Sciences.

== History ==
The graduating class of 1972 was shrunk by two thirds due to desegregation push by Chattanooga City Schools.

== Notable alumni ==
- Samuel L. Jackson, actor and director
- Mike Jones, football, NFL wide receiver from 1983-89.
- Richard Fuqua, basketball, All-American at Oral Roberts University in Tulsa, Oklahoma, and fourth-round pick of the Boston Celtics in the 1973 NBA draft.
- Anthony Roberts, basketball, 1977 first-round pick of Denver Nuggets of the NBA. He played college basketball at Oral Roberts University in Tulsa, Oklahoma.
