= Jerry Hale =

American basketball coach (1936–2014)

Biographical details
- Born: January 20, 1936; Texhoma, Oklahoma, U.S.
- Died: December 18, 2014 (aged 78)

Playing career
- 1956–1959: Oklahoma A&M
- 1959–1961: Peoria Caterpillars

Coaching career (HC unless noted)
- 1961–1966: Dumas HS
- 1966–1968: UTEP (assistant)
- 1968–1974: College of Southern Idaho
- 1974–1977: Oral Roberts

Jerry Hale (January 20, 1936 – December 18, 2014) was an American college basketball coach who served as head coach for the College of Southern Idaho and Oral Roberts University.

Hale played college basketball for Henry Iba at Oklahoma A&M University (now Oklahoma State University) where he was a three-year starter. After playing two seasons for the Peoria Caterpillars, Hale began his coaching career at Dumas High School in Texas. He moved to the college ranks as an assistant to Don Haskins at UTEP, before becoming head coach at the junior college College of Southern Idaho. After five seasons and a 161–22 record, Hale was named head coach at Oral Roberts. Hale coached three seasons at Oral Roberts, compiling a record of 61–21. He resigned following the 1976–77 season, despite his .744 winning percentage at the school.

Hale's son Steve played college basketball at North Carolina under Dean Smith.

Hale died on December 18, 2014, after a battle with Alzheimer's disease.

== Head coaching record ==
=== Senior college ===
Statistics overview
| Season | Team | Overall | Conference | Standing | Postseason |
|---|---|---|---|---|---|
Oral Roberts Titans (NCAA Division I Independent) (1974–1977)
| 1974–75 | Oral Roberts | 20–8 | | | |
| 1975–76 | Oral Roberts | 20–6 | | | |
| 1976–77 | Oral Roberts | 21–7 | | | |
| Oral Roberts: | | 61–21 (.744) | | | |
| Total: | | 61–21 (.744) | | | |
