= Raynold E. Acre =

Raynold Edward Acre
- Born: July 16, 1889; Auburn, New York
- Died: January 16, 1966 (aged 76); Los Angeles, California
- Employer: Air Associates Inc.
- Spouse: Anne M. Schatz (1894-1967) (m. 1910–1966)
- Children: Harry Raymond Acre (1911–1984)

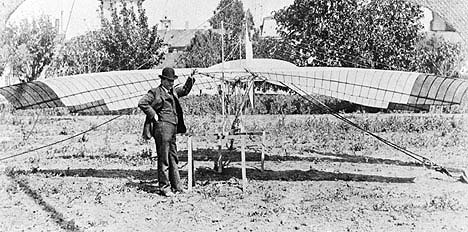
Lougheed and Acre modified a Montgomery tandem-wing aircraft similar to the Santa Clara glider shown here

Raynold Edward Acre (1889–1966) was a member of the Early Birds of Aviation, a small group of pilots that flew before World War I.

== Biography ==
He was born on July 16, 1889, in Auburn, New York, to David Acre and Anna Forgette.

Acre's first flight was in a Montgomery tandem-wing glider replica at Daytona Beach, Florida, in 1909.

He married Anne M. Schatz (1894-1967) in 1910 and they had a son, Harry Raymond Acre (1911–1984).

In 1910 Acre was living in a tent outside the Hawthorne Race Track in Chicago, Illinois. Acre and Edward Andrews (aviator) worked on a 1905 glider built by John Joseph Montgomery, fitted with a 12 hp Bates engine. Victor Loughead and his half brother Allan Haines Loughead were licensed distributors of Montgomery gliders with Chicago auto dealer James E. Plew as a client. They also purchased a 30 hp Curtiss pusher which Acre was able to fly after Allen.

In 1928 Acre was working with Air Associates Inc, an exclusive east coast distributor of Lockheed aircraft. Acre flew as a passenger in the 1928 National Air Tour demonstrating the new Lockheed Vega. Acre became vice president in 1941 following a rare wartime government seizure by Franklin D. Roosevelt during a C.I.O strike. Acre stayed in the position through World War II. He remained active as a general aviation pilot, owning and flying a Beechcraft Bonanza.

He died on January 16, 1966, in Los Angeles, California.
