= Alvin Scott =

American basketball player

Personal information
- Born: September 14, 1955 (age 71) Cleveland, Tennessee, U.S.
- Listed height: 6 ft 7 in (2.01 m)
- Listed weight: 185 lb (84 kg)

Career information
- High school: Bradley Central (Cleveland, Tennessee)
- College: Oral Roberts (1973–1977)
- NBA draft: 1977: 7th round, 136th overall pick
- Drafted by: Phoenix Suns
- Playing career: 1977–1988
- Position: Small forward / shooting guard
- Number: 14

Career history
- 1977–1985: Phoenix Suns
- 1987–1988: RCD Espanyol

Career NBA statistics
- Points: 3,088 (4.9 ppg)
- Rebounds: 1,992 (3.2 rpg)
- Assists: 847 (1.4 apg)
- Stats at NBA.com
- Stats at Basketball Reference

Alvin Leroy Scott (born September 14, 1955) is an American former basketball player for the Phoenix Suns (from 1977 to 1985). Born in Cleveland, Tennessee, he attended Oral Roberts University.

Scott was part of a family of basketball players. His brother Terry Scott also played basketball at Oral Roberts, as well as Middle Tennessee State University and the University of Oklahoma. His other brother Levi Scott was among the first African-American athletes in Bradley County, Tennessee, while his sister Gloria played basketball for the Tennessee Volunteers women's program.

== Career statistics ==
Legend
GP	Games played	GS	Games started	MPG	Minutes per game
FG%	Field goal percentage	3P%	3-point field goal percentage	FT%	Free throw percentage
RPG	Rebounds per game	APG	Assists per game	SPG	Steals per game
BPG	Blocks per game	PPG	Points per game	**Bold**	Career high

=== NBA ===
==== Regular season ====
Year	Team	GP	GS	MPG	FG%	3P%	FT%	RPG	APG	SPG	BPG	PPG
1977–78	Phoenix	81		19.0	.488		.691	**4.4**	1.1	.6	.5	6.1
1978–79	Phoenix	81		21.4	**.535**		.714	**4.4**	1.6	**1.0**	.8	**6.7**
1979–80	Phoenix	79		16.5	.422	.333	**.779**	2.9	1.2	.6	.7	4.4
1980–81	Phoenix	**82**		17.4	.497	.167	.764	3.3	1.4	.7	**.9**	5.4
1981–82	Phoenix	81	**38**	**21.5**	.497	.000	.730	3.6	**1.8**	.7	**.9**	6.0
1982–83	Phoenix	81	9	14.1	.479	.000	.736	2.8	1.2	.6	.4	4.1
1983–84	Phoenix	65	5	11.3	.444	**.500**	.778	1.5	.7	.3	.3	2.6
1984–85	Phoenix	77	18	16.1	.429	.200	.716	2.1	1.6	.5	.3	3.6
Career		627	70	17.3	.481	.200	.733	3.2	1.4	.6	.6	4.9

==== Playoffs ====
Year	Team	GP	GS	MPG	FG%	3P%	FT%	RPG	APG	SPG	BPG	PPG
1978	Phoenix	2		18.5	.500		.833	3.0	1.5	1.0	.0	**6.5**
1979	Phoenix	15		14.5	.385		.619	2.8	1.5	.4	1.1	3.5
1980	Phoenix	8		17.5	**.515**	.000	.500	2.8	1.3	.5	.6	4.8
1981	Phoenix	7		17.1	.467	–	.667	2.7	1.0	.6	.9	5.4
1982	Phoenix	7		18.1	.438	.000	.500	2.3	2.0	**1.1**	**1.9**	4.6
1983	Phoenix	3		20.7	.462	–	**1.000**	**4.0**	1.7	.7	1.7	4.7
1984	Phoenix	**16**		6.9	.385	**1.000**	.667	1.5	.4	.1	.1	1.6
1985	Phoenix	3	0	**21.3**	.250	.000	.833	2.7	**3.3**	.3	1.3	3.7
Career		61	0	14.4	.427	.125	.653	2.4	1.3	.5	.8	3.7
