= Presley Askew =

American basketball and baseball coach (1909–1994)

Biographical details
- Born: November 17, 1909; Le Flore, Oklahoma, U.S.
- Died: February 7, 1994 (aged 84); Las Cruces, New Mexico, U.S.
- Education: Eastern Oklahoma State College

Coaching career (HC unless noted)

Basketball
- 1930–1932: Fanshawe Public School (assistant)
- 1932-1937: Fanshawe Public School
- 1937–1942: Red Oak HS
- 1942–1948: Van Buren HS
- 1948–1949: Arkansas (assistant)
- 1949–1952: Arkansas
- 1952–1953: Connors State
- 1953–1965: New Mexico A&M / State

Baseball
- 1957–1965: New Mexico A&M / State

Administrative career (AD unless noted)
- 1953–1958: New Mexico A&M

Head coaching record
- Overall: 169–183 (college basketball); 68–126–3 (college baseball)
- Tournaments: Basketball; 0–2 (NCAA)

Accomplishments and honors

Championships
- Basketball; 1 Southwest Conference regular season (1950); 3 Border Conference regular season (1959–1961)

Presley Askew (November 17, 1909 – February 7, 1994) was an American basketball and baseball coach. Overall Askew won 169 games at New Mexico State and Arkansas and had an overall record of 509–312 in all high school and college coaching.

== Coaching career ==
Born in Red Oak, Oklahoma, Askew played basketball and graduated from Red Oak High School in 1926. He played for and graduated from Eastern Oklahoma State College, and eventually Oklahoma State University in 1930. He began coaching at Fanshawe Public School and became head varsity coach in 1932. In 1937 Askew moved to his hometown Red Oak High School to coach and was there until 1942 when he moved on to Van Buren High School in Arkansas. Askew's teams at Van Buren were very competitive and went to the state championship tournaments.

In 1947 Askew accepted an assistant coaching position at Arkansas and the following year was named the head coach. In his first season he tied for first in the Southwest Conference. The following two seasons were not as good and he was fired. Askew coached at Connors State College the next season before being hired as the head basketball and baseball coach at what was then New Mexico A&M in 1953.

Askew coached New Mexico State for twelve seasons that included three Border Conference championships and two NCAA tournament appearances. He resigned after the 1964–65 season.

== Legacy and death ==
Askew was awarded the NABC Merit and Honor awards in 1977. New Mexico State dedicated their baseball field as Presley Askew Field in 1981 in honor of their former coach.

He died on February 7, 1994, at the age of 84 in Las Cruces, New Mexico.

== Head coaching record ==
=== College basketball ===
Record table
| Season | Team | Overall | Conference | Standing | Postseason |
|---|---|---|---|---|---|
Arkansas Razorbacks (Southwest Conference) (1949–1952)
| 1949–50 | Arkansas | 12–12 | 8–4 | T–1st | |
| 1950–51 | Arkansas | 13–11 | 7–5 | 4th | |
| 1951–52 | Arkansas | 10–14 | 4–8 | T–6th | |
| Arkansas: | | 35–37 | 19–17 | | |
New Mexico A&M / State Aggies (Border Conference) (1953–1962)
| 1953–54 | New Mexico A&M | 6–12 | 3–9 | T–6th | |
| 1954–55 | New Mexico A&M | 6–13 | 1–11 | 7th | |
| 1955–56 | New Mexico A&M | 16–7 | 7–5 | T–2nd | |
| 1956–57 | New Mexico A&M | 6–18 | 3–7 | 6th | |
| 1957–58 | New Mexico A&M | 14–9 | 7–3 | 2nd | |
| 1958–59 | New Mexico A&M | 17–11 | 7–3 | T–1st | NCAA first round |
| 1959–60 | New Mexico A&M | 20–7 | 8–2 | 1st | NCAA first round |
| 1960–61 | New Mexico State | 19–5 | 9–1 | T–1st | |
| 1961–62 | New Mexico State | 10–14 | 3–5 | T–3rd | |
New Mexico State Aggies (NCAA University Division independent) (1963–1965)
| 1962–63 | New Mexico State | 4–17 | | | |
| 1963–64 | New Mexico State | 8–15 | | | |
| 1964–65 | New Mexico State | 8–18 | | | |
| New Mexico State: | | 134–146 | 48–46 | | |
| Total: | | 169–183 | | | |
National champion Postseason invitational champion Conference regular season champion Conference regular season and conference tournament champion Division regular season champion Division regular season and conference tournament champion Conference tournament champion
