= New Mexico State Aggies men's basketball =

College sports team

New Mexico State Aggies
2026–27 New Mexico State Aggies men's basketball team
- University: New Mexico State University
- Head coach: Jason Hooten (4th season)
- Location: Las Cruces, New Mexico
- Arena: Pan American Center (capacity: 12,482)
- Conference: Conference USA
- Nickname: Aggies
- Colors: Crimson and white

NCAA Division I tournament third place
- 1970
Other NCAA Division I tournament results
Final Four	1970
Elite Eight	1970
Sweet Sixteen	1952, 1968, 1969, 1970, 1992*
Appearances	1952, 1959, 1960, 1967, 1968, 1969, 1970, 1971, 1975, 1979, 1990, 1991, 1992*, 1993*, 1994*, 1999, 2007, 2010, 2012, 2013, 2014, 2015, 2017, 2018, 2019, 2022

Conference tournament champions
- Big West: 1992, 1994, 1999; WAC: 2007, 2010, 2012, 2013, 2014, 2015, 2017, 2018, 2019, 2022

Conference regular-season champions
- Border: 1937, 1938, 1939, 1940, 1952, 1959, 1960; Missouri Valley: 1977; Big West: 1990, 1993, 1994, 1997*, 1999; WAC: 2008, 2015, 2016, 2018, 2019, 2020, 2022

Conference division champions
- Big West East: 1997*, 1999; Sun Belt West: 2002

Uniforms
Home	Away
- * Appearances vacated by NCAA

The New Mexico State Aggies men's basketball team represents New Mexico State University in Las Cruces, New Mexico. Founded in 1904, the Aggies compete in Conference USA after spending 18 seasons in the Western Athletic Conference from 2005 through 2023. The Aggies, who last played in the NCAA Division I men's basketball tournament in 2022, are one of 34 college basketball teams with multiple NBA retired jerseys from former players (Sam Lacey and John Williamson) and a team that reached the NCAA Final Four in 1970. The team plays home games in the Pan American Center.

A Lou Henson-coached team gained national attention during the 1970 NCAA Division I men's basketball tournament by advancing to the Final Four. In 1992, a Neil McCarthy-coached team advanced to the Sweet Sixteen, though that appearance has since been vacated. Aggie Basketball has seen 26 NCAA tournament appearances, 5 NIT Tournament appearances, 21 regular season conference championships, and 13 conference tournament championships.

== History ==
NMSU basketball has seen much success throughout the years, reaching the NCAA Final Four in 1970, the Sweet Sixteen in 1992 among their 23 tournament appearances. Their two most successful coaches were Lou Henson and Neil McCarthy.

=== Jerry Hines era (1929–1940, '46) ===
Jerry Hines was an outstanding two-sport athlete, the head basketball and head football coach, and the athletic director. During the later 1930s, the Aggie football team was 31–10–6 and the basketball team was 102–36 under Hines. The Aggie basketball team went to several postseason tournaments during this time, including the 1938 NAIA Division I men's basketball tournament, and the 1939 National Invitation Tournament in New York City. The Hines era ended at the onset of World War II when he was called to duty in September 1940 as a member of a New Mexico National Guard unit assigned to the 45 Infantry Division. Hines did return for one more Aggie basketball season in 1946–47.

=== Lou Henson era (1966–1975) ===
Lou Henson played for the Aggies in the 1950s, coached at Las Cruces High School, and came from Hardin-Simmons University to become the head coach. His tenure was the most successful in Aggie history. His 1970 team reached the NCAA tournament Final Four, losing to a John Wooden-coached and eventual champion, UCLA.

Henson led the Aggies to the NCAA tournament in six of his nine years. He left in 1975 for a successful 21-year run at Illinois.

=== Neil McCarthy (1985–1997) ===
Neil McCarthy came to Las Cruces in 1985 following a successful 10-year run at Weber State. He had built Weber State into a regional power, and was equally successful at New Mexico State. For most of McCarthy's tenure, the Aggies were the second-best team in the Big West, behind UNLV. McCarthy led the Aggies to four straight regular season and tournament titles, including the 1992 Sweet Sixteen run.

==== Academic Scandal ====
The 1992 Sweet Sixteen run, along with two other NCAA runs in the early 1990s, was scrubbed from the books in 1996 when the NCAA found several players from that team received help on correspondence courses from a coach. Six Aggie players were found to have received help. Without those courses, the players would not have been eligible.

The McCarthy era came to a sudden and abrupt end just weeks before the 1997–98 season when new athletic director Jim Paul stripped him of coaching duties, citing the team's poor academic performance. Only nine of McCarthy's players had graduated in 12 years, including only one in the last four. McCarthy was originally supposed to serve as an assistant athletic director for the balance of his contract, but instead sued NMSU for wrongful termination—a move that would come back to haunt the school later.

In 2000, the Aggies were rocked again by a scandal from the McCarthy era. McCarthy had promised to hire a junior college coach as an assistant coach in return for bringing two of his top players to Las Cruces. That coach, Fletcher Cockrell, helped the two players with coursework and exams. The school placed the basketball program on two years' probation and withdrew from postseason consideration during the 2000–01 season. The NCAA imposed an additional four years' probation and forced the Aggies to vacate McCarthy's last season and the first season of Henson's second stint. The NCAA said that the penalties would have been even harsher if the school's former president, the former athletic director and McCarthy had still been at the school.

=== Lou Henson's 2nd run (1997–2004) ===
Henson was lured from retirement to coach the team on an interim basis for the 1997–98 season after McCarthy's ouster. He initially came back because he wanted to help the Aggies during their search for a new head coach. Henson wanted to donate his time, but state law forbade him from coaching the program for free. He ultimately settled for $1 per month. The following season Henson agreed to stay on as head coach on a permanent basis, leading the Aggies back to the NCAA tournament in 1999.

Henson continued to coach the Aggies until being sidelined by non-Hodgkin lymphoma prior to the 2004–05 season. Due to Henson's illness the Aggies were led that year by assistant coach Tony Stubblefield, who guided the squad to a dismal 6–24 record, by far the school's worst season in twenty years. Henson officially announced his retirement from coaching in January 2005, and Stubblefield remained interim head coach for the remainder of the season.

=== Reggie Theus (2005–2007) ===
On March 31, 2005, NMSU hired 13-year NBA veteran Reggie Theus, then an assistant at Louisville under Rick Pitino, as head men's basketball coach. In his first season, Theus turned the Aggies from a 6–24 squad in 2004–05 to a 16–14 team in the 2005–06 season as the Aggies moved from the Sun Belt Conference to the Western Athletic Conference. In Theus's second year the Aggies finished the regular season at 22–8, won the WAC tournament on their home floor, and earn an automatic bid to the 2007 NCAA tournament. Following the tournament Theus left NMSU to take over the head coaching position of the NBA's Sacramento Kings.

=== Marvin Menzies (2007–2016) ===
Marvin Menzies was named as Theus' successor, and like Theus before him, came to NMSU after having been an assistant to Pitino and had no previous Division I head coaching experience. In 2010 the Aggies again won the WAC Tournament and advanced to the NCAA tournament, falling 70–67 in the first round to eventual Final Four participant Michigan State. In 2012 the Aggies once again advanced to the NCAA tournament by winning the WAC Tournament for the third time in six seasons. They continued to appear in the NCAA tournament through 2015. After their 2016 NIT tournament appearance, Marvin Menzies was hired to take over the Nevada-Las Vegas (UNLV) basketball program.

=== Paul Weir (2016–2017) ===
Paul Weir served in the role of associate head coach from July 2011 until he was promoted to head coach on April 26, 2016. He helped the Aggies to five WAC Tournament Championships (2010, 2012–2015) and five NCAA tournament appearances. The Aggies have collected three WAC Championships during Weir's tenure. The Aggies have won back-to-back WAC regular season titles in 2015 and 2016 after collecting their first WAC regular season title in 2008. Overall, NM State has collected seven WAC titles during his nine years with the program. Weir left after one season to coach the New Mexico Lobos, a rival of the Aggies.

=== Chris Jans (2017–2022) ===
Former Bowling Green head coach Chris Jans was named the new head coach of the Aggies on April 17, 2017. He had been serving in an administrative role at Wichita State after being fired from BGSU in 2015 and was promoted to associate head coach of the Shockers just 4 days prior to being hired by NMSU. In his first season at NMSU, The Aggies won 28 games for the second year in a row, and won both the WAC regular season title and conference championship to advance to the NCAA tournament, where they lost to Clemson in the first round. In 2022 New Mexico State won a first round NCAA tournament game against University of Connecticut, before losing to Arkansas. Jans was hired by Mississippi State after the 2022 season.

=== Greg Heiar (2022–2023) ===
Greg Heiar was named the head coach of the Aggies on March 28, 2022. He was formerly the head coach at Northwest Florida State College, where he won the 2022 NJCAA Men's Division I Basketball Championship. On February 14, 2023, Greg Heiar was removed as the head coach of New Mexico State men's basketball team due to hazing allegations.

== Season-by-season results ==
Season	Overall record*	Conference tournament	Postseason results	Head coach
Border Conference
1932–33	7–11 (2–10)	–	–	Jerry Hines
1933–34	10–9 (2–6)	–	–	Jerry Hines
1934–35	12–6 (4–6)	–	–	Jerry Hines
1935–36	10–9 (8–8)	–	–	Jerry Hines
1936–37	22–5 (15–3, 1st)	–	–	Jerry Hines
1937–38	22–3 (18–0, 1st)	–	NAIA Quarterfinals	Jerry Hines
1938–39	20–4 (14–2, 1st)	–	NIT Quarterfinals	Jerry Hines
1939–40	16–7 (12–4)	–	–	Jerry Hines
1940–41	14–12 (8–8)	–	–	Julius Johnston
1941–42	8–18 (4–10)	–	–	Julius Johnston
1944–45	9–5 (0–0)	–	–	Kermit Laabs
1945–46	5–16 (1–9)	–	–	Kermit Laabs
1946–47	8–17 (3–15)	–	–	Jerry Hines
1947–48	12–11 (8–10)	–	–	John Gunn
1948–49	9–15 (4–12)	–	–	John Gunn
1949–50	17–13 (7–11)	–	NAIA first round	George McCarty
1950–51	19–14 (11–6)	–	NAIA Quarterfinals	George McCarty
1951–52	22–11 (14–4)	–	NCAA second round, NCAA Sweet 16	George McCarty
1952–53	7–17 (5–9)	–	–	George McCarty
1953–54	7–12 (3–9)	–	–	Presley Askew
1954–55	7–14 (1–11)	–	–	Presley Askew
1955–56	16–7 (7–5)	–	–	Presley Askew
1956–57	6–18 (3–7)	–	–	Presley Askew
1957–58	14–9 (8–3)	–	–	Presley Askew
1958–59	17–11 (7–3, T1)	–	NCAA 1st round	Presley Askew
1959–60	20–7 (9–2, 1st)	–	NCAA 1st round	Presley Askew
1960–61	19–5 (9–1, T1)	–	–	Presley Askew
1961–62	10–14 (3–5)	–	–	Presley Askew
Independent
1962–63	4–17	–	–	Presley Askew
1963–64	8–15	–	–	Presley Askew
1964–65	8–18	–	–	Presley Askew
1965–66	4–22	–	–	Jim McGregor
1966–67	15–11	–	NCAA 1st round	Lou Henson
1967–68	23–6	–	NCAA Sweet 16	Lou Henson
1968–69	24–5	–	NCAA Sweet 16	Lou Henson
1969–70	27–3	–	NCAA Final Four	Lou Henson
1970–71	19–8	–	NCAA 1st round	Lou Henson
1971–72	20–6	–	–	Lou Henson
Missouri Valley Conference
1972–73	12–14 (6–8, T5)	–	–	Lou Henson
1973–74	15–11 (7–6, T3)	–	–	Lou Henson
1974–75	20–7 (11–3, 2nd)	–	NCAA 1st round	Lou Henson
1975–76	15–12 (4–8, T4)	–	–	Ken Hayes
1976–77	17–10 (8–4, T1)	(0–1) Semifinals	–	Ken Hayes
1977–78	15–14 (9–7, 4th)	(2–1) Semifinals	–	Ken Hayes
1978–79	22–10 (11–5, 2nd)	(2–1) Finals	NCAA 1st round	Ken Hayes
1979–80	17–10 (8–8, T5)	(0–1) First Round	–	Weldon Drew
1980–81	10–17 (7–9, T6)	(0–1) First Round	–	Weldon Drew
1981–82	17–10 (8–8, T5)	(1–1) Semifinals	–	Weldon Drew
1982–83	18–11 (11–7, T3)	(1–1) Semifinals	–	Weldon Drew
Big West Conference
1983–84	13–15 (9–9, 5th)	(0–1) First Round	–	Weldon Drew
1984–85	7–20 (4–14, 9th)	–	–	Weldon Drew
1985–86	18–12 (10–8, 3rd)	(1–2) Finals	–	Neil McCarthy
1986–87	15–15 (9–9, T4)	(0–1) First Round	–	Neil McCarthy
1987–88	16–16 (8–10, T6)	(0–1) Second Round	–	Neil McCarthy
1988–89	21–11 (12–6, 3rd)	(2–1) Finals	NIT 1st round	Neil McCarthy
1989–90	26–5 (16–2, T1)	(1–1) Semifinals	NCAA 1st round	Neil McCarthy
1990–91	23–6 (15–3, 2nd)	(0–1) First Round	NCAA 1st round	Neil McCarthy
1991–92	25–8 (12–6, 3rd)	(3–0) Champion	NCAA Sweet 16	Neil McCarthy
1992–93	26–8 (15–3, 1st)	(2–1) Finals	NCAA 2nd round	Neil McCarthy
1993–94	23–8 (12–6, 1st)	(3–0) Champion	NCAA 1st round	Neil McCarthy
1994–95	25–10 (13–5, T2)	(1–1) Semifinals	NIT Quarterfinals	Neil McCarthy
1995–96	11–15 (8–10, 3rd)	–	–	Neil McCarthy
1996–97	19–9 (12–4, T1–East)	(1–1) Semifinals	–	Neil McCarthy
1997–98	18–12 (8–8, 5th–East)	–	–	Lou Henson
1998–99	23–10 (12–4, T1–East)	(3–0) Champion	NCAA 1st round	Lou Henson
1999–2000	22–10 (11–5, 2nd–East)	(2–1) Finals	NIT 1st round	Lou Henson
Sun Belt Conference
2000–01	14–14 (10–6, West)	–	–	Lou Henson
2001–02	20–12 (11–4, West)	–	–	Lou Henson
2002–03	20–9 (9–6, West)	–	–	Lou Henson
2003–04	13–14 (6–9, West)	–	–	Lou Henson
2004–05	6–24 (1–14, West)	–	–	Lou Henson
Western Athletic Conference
2005–06	16–14 (10–6, T4)	(1–1) Semifinals	–	Reggie Theus
2006–07	25–9 (11–5, 2nd)	(3–0) Champion	NCAA 1st round	Reggie Theus
2007–08	21–14 (12–4, T1)	(2–1) Finals	–	Marvin Menzies
2008–09	17–15 (9–7, T3)	(1–1) Semifinals	–	Marvin Menzies
2009–10	22–12 (11–5, T2)	(3–0) Champion	NCAA 1st round	Marvin Menzies
2010–11	16–17 (9–7, T3)	(1–1) Semi–Finals	–	Marvin Menzies
2011–12	26–9 (10–4, 2nd)	(3–0) Champion	NCAA 1st round	Marvin Menzies
2012–13	24–11 (14–4, 3rd)	(3–0) Champion	NCAA 1st round	Marvin Menzies
2013–14	26–10 (12–4, 2nd)	(3–0) Champion	NCAA 1st round	Marvin Menzies
2014–15	24–11 (13–1, 1st)	(2–0) Champion	NCAA 1st round	Marvin Menzies
2015–16	23–11 (13–1, 1st)	(1–1) Finals	NIT 1st round	Marvin Menzies
2016–17	28–6 (11–3, T2)	(3–0) Champion	NCAA 1st round	Paul Weir
2017–18	28–6 (12–2, 1st)	(3–0) Champion	NCAA 1st round	Chris Jans
2018–19	30–5 (15–1, 1st)	(3–0) Champion	NCAA 1st round	Chris Jans
2019–20	25–6 (16–0, 1st)	Tournament cancelled	Postseason not held	Chris Jans
2020–21	12–8 (7–6, 3rd)	(2–1) Finals	–	Chris Jans
2021–22	27–7 (14–4, T1) **	(2–0) Champion	NCAA 2nd round	Chris Jans
2022-23	9-15 (2–10)			Greg Heiar

* — Overall record includes tournament and postseason results; Regular–season conference record and place contained in parentheses.

** — Forfeit by Lamar University on Jan. 6, 2022, is not included in overall record, but is included in conference record.

== Coaches ==
The Aggies have had 27 coaches in their 110-year history. Six Aggie coaches have been named conference Coach-of-the-Year: Lou Henson in 1975, Ken Hayes in 1977, and Weldon Drew in 1983 in the Missouri Valley Conference; Neil McCarthy in 1989 and 1990 in the Big West Conference; Marvin Menzies in 2015, and Chris Jans in 2018, 2019 and 2020 in the Western Athletic Conference.

== Postseason Results ==
=== NCAA tournament ===
The Aggies have appeared in 26 NCAA tournaments. Their combined record is 11–27.

Year	Seed	Round	Opponent	Result
1952		Sweet Sixteen; Regional third place Game	Saint Louis; TCU	L 53–62; L 44–61
1959		First Round	Idaho State	L 61–62
1960		First Round	Oregon	L 60–68
1967		First Round	Houston	L 58–59
1968		First Round; Sweet Sixteen; Regional third place Game	Weber State; UCLA; New Mexico	W 68–57; L 49–58; W 62–58
1969		First Round; Sweet Sixteen; Regional third place Game	BYU; UCLA; Weber State	W 74–62; L 38–53; L 56–58
1970		First Round; Sweet Sixteen; Elite Eight; Final Four; National Third Place Game	Rice; Kansas State; Drake; UCLA; St. Bonaventure	W 101–77; W 70–66; W 87–78; L 77–93; W 79–73
1971		First Round	Houston	L 69–71
1975		First Round	North Carolina	L 69–93
1979	#10	First Round	#7 Weber State	L 78–81^{OT}
1990	#6	First Round	#11 Loyola Marymount	L 92–111
1991	#6	First Round	#11 Creighton	L 56–64
1992	#12	First Round; Second Round; Sweet Sixteen	#5 DePaul #13 Southwest Louisiana #1 UCLA	W 81–73; W 81–73; L 78–85
1993	#7	First Round; Second Round	#10 Nebraska #2 Cincinnati	W 93–79; L 55–92
1994	#11	First Round	#6 Oklahoma State	L 55–65
1999	#14	First Round	#3 Kentucky	L 60–82
2007	#13	First Round	#4 Texas	L 67–79
2010	#12	First Round	#5 Michigan State	L 67–70
2012	#13	First Round	#4 Indiana	L 66–79
2013	#13	First Round	#4 Saint Louis	L 44–64
2014	#13	First Round	#4 San Diego State	L 69–73^{OT}
2015	#15	First Round	#2 Kansas	L 56–75
2017	#14	First Round	#3 Baylor	L 73–91
2018	#12	First Round	#5 Clemson	L 68–79
2019	#12	First Round	#5 Auburn	L 77–78
2022	#12	First Round; Second Round	#5 UConn #4 Arkansas	W 70–63; L 48–53

From 2010 to 2015 the round of 64 was known as the second round

==== NCAA tournament seeding history ====
The NCAA began seeding the tournament with the 1979 edition.

Years →	'79	'90	'91	'92	'93	'94	'99	'07	'10	'12	'13	'14	'15	'17	'18	'19	'22
Seeds →	10	6	6	12	7	11	14	13	12	13	13	13	15	14	12	12	12

=== NAIA tournament ===
The Aggies have appeared in four NAIA Tournaments. Their combined record is 5–4.

Year	Location	Round	Result
1938	Kansas City, MO	First	W 53–37 over McPherson
		Second	W 56–40 over Idaho-Southern
		Quarterfinals	L 29–30 to Murray State University
1950	Kansas City, MO	First	L 85–75 to Tampa
1951	Kansas City, MO	First	W 68–54 over Glenville State
		Second	W 73–69 over Central (MO)
		Quarterfinals	L 80–56 to Hamline
1952	Kansas City, MO	First	W 86–70 over Mississippi Southern
		Second	L 52–69 to Southwest Texas State

=== National Invitational tournament ===
The Aggies have appeared in the National Invitation Tournament (NIT) five times. Their combined record is 2–5.

Year	Round	Opponent	Result
1939	Quarterfinals	Long Island	L 45–52
1989	First Round	Pepperdine	L 76–91
1995	First Round; Second Round; Quarterfinals	Colorado; UTEP; Virginia Tech	W 97–83; W 92–89; L 61–64
2000	First Round	Arizona State	L 77–83
2016	First Round	Saint Mary's	L 56–58

== Aggies of note ==
=== Ring of Honor ===
New Mexico State's men's basketball Ring of Honor stands as a tribute to individual players and coaches that are distinguished as Aggie legends. A player's number is retired upon reaching this milestone. A banner designating this honor is hung from the rafters in the Pan American Center.

Lou Henson – began his coaching career with the Aggies in 1966, eventually coaching the Aggies to 289 victories over 17 years. Henson finished with 779 victories including his wins at Illinois. Henson coached the Aggies to the Final Four and two Sweet Sixteens among the 10 NCAA tournament appearances. His career Aggie record is 289–152, which is the winningest in Aggie history.

Sam Lacey (#44) – played for the Aggies from 1967 to 1970, including a trip to the Final Four. Lacey is 11th in Aggie all-time scoring and holds most rebounding records. He was a 1st Team All-American in 1970 and played in the NBA for 13 seasons, well enough to get his #44 jersey retired by the Sacramento Kings.

Billy Joe Price (#31) – played from 1957 to 1961, including two trips to the NCAA tournament. Price is 15th on the all-time scoring list and among the career leaders in rebounding.

Jimmy Collins (#22) – played for the Aggies from 1967 to 1970 and helped them to the Final Four in 1970. Collins holds the Aggie season scoring record and rank 3rd all-time in career scoring. Collins played in the NBA for several seasons.

John Williamson (#24) – is the most prolific scorer in Aggie history, averaging over 27 points per game during the 1971–72 and 1972–73 seasons. Williamson played for the New York/New Jersey Nets and won two ABA championships. His #23 jersey is retired by the Nets.

Jerry Hines – was the Aggie basketball coach, as well as football coach, during the 1930s. The Aggies advanced to the NIT Tournament in 1938. His career record is 157–108, which is third winningest in Aggie history.

=== Honored players ===
These Aggies have been honored by either induction in the New Mexico State Athletics Hall of Fame, or recognized as an All-American, or recognized as conference player of the year.

Names	Years	Awards and Achievements
Teddy Allen	2021–2022	WAC Player of the Year, WAC 1st Team
A.F. 'Hooky' Apodaca	1934–37	Hall of Fame Inductee (1970); 3x Border 1st Team
Lauro Apodaca	1936–37	Hall of Fame Inductee (1970); Border 1st Team
Ian Baker	2013–17	WAC Player of the Year; 2x WAC 1st Team
William Benjamin	1988–92	Hall of Fame Inductee (2022)
Randy Brown	1989–91	Hall of Fame Inductee (1997); All-Century Team; 2x Big West 1st Team; Season Steal Leader
Eric Channing	1998–2002	Hall of Fame Inductee (2008); All-Century Team; 3x Academic All-American; Big West 1st Team; 2x Sun Belt 1st Team; Career Scoring Leader; Career 3-pt FG Leader; Career FT% Leader
Jimmy Collins	1967–70	Ring of Honor; Hall of Fame Inductee (1975); 3x 1st Team All-American; All NCAA Final Four Team; NCAA Midwest Region MVP; All-Century Team; Season Scoring Leader
Steve Colter	1980–84	Hall of Fame Inductee (1991); All-Century Team; Big West 1st Team
Charlie Criss	1967–70	Hall of Fame Inductee (1975); All-American; All-Century Team
Rob Evans	1966–68	Hall of Fame Inductee (1994)
Pecos Finley	1937–39	Hall of Fame Inductee (1970); Border 1st Team
Joe Jackson	1938–40	Hall of Fame Inductee (1970); 2x Border 1st Team
Albert 'Slab' Jones	1976–80	Hall of Fame Inductee (1982); All-Century Team; 2x MVC 1st Team
Jemerrio Jones	2016–18	WAC Player of the Year, WAC 1st Team
George Knighton	1959–62	Hall of Fame Inductee (1970); All-Century Team; 3x Border 1st Team
Sam Lacey	1967–70	Ring of Honor; Hall of Fame Inductee (1975); All-Century Team; All-American; NCAA All Midwest Region Team; Game, Season and Career Rebounding Leader;
Kiko Martinez	1937–39	Hall of Fame Inductee (1970); All-Century Team; 2x Border 1st Team
Jay Mechem	1932–33	Hall of Fame Inductee (1970)
James Moore	2000–04	Hall of Fame Inductee (2017); All-Century Team; All American; Sun Belt Player of the Year; 2x Sun Belt 1st Team; Sun Belt Freshman of the Year; Game and Career Block Leader
Daniel Mullings	2011–15	WAC Player of the Year; 2x WAC 1st Team
Billy Joe Price	1957–61	Ring of Honor; Hall of Fame Inductee (2017); 2x Border 1st Team
Johnny Roberson	1985–89	Hall of Fame Inductee (2015); Big West 1st Team
Richard Robinson	1973–77	Hall of Fame Inductee (1977); All-Century Team; 2x MVC 1st Team
Pascal Siakam	2014–16	All American; WAC Player of the Year; WAC 1st Team
Jim Tackett	1950–51	Hall of Fame Inductee (1999); 2x Border 1st Team
Gary Ward	1960–62	Hall of Fame Inductee (1991)
John Williamson	1971–73	Ring of Honor; Hall of Fame Inductee (1974); All-Century Team; All American; Game Scoring Leader
Morris Wood	1937–39	Hall of Fame Inductee (1970); 2x Border 1st Team

=== Honored coaches ===
These Aggie coaches have been honored by either induction in the New Mexico State Athletics Hall of Fame, or recognized as conference coach of the year.

Name	Years	Awards and Achievements
Presley Askew	1953–65	Hall of Fame Inductee (1970); NABC Merit and Honor Awards
Lou Henson	1966–75; 1997–05	Ring of Honor; Hall of Fame Inductee (1978); All-Century Team head coach; All Time Wins Leader; NABC Golden Anniversary Award; MVC Coach of the Year
Jerry Hines	1929–40; 1946–47	Ring of Honor; Hall of Fame Inductee (1970)
Chris Jans	2017–22	3x WAC Coach of the Year
Neil McCarthy	1985–97	2x Big West Coach of the Year
George McCarty	1949–53	Hall of Fame Inductee (2009)
Marvin Menzies	2007–16	WAC Coach of the Year

=== Honored contributors ===
These Aggie contributors have been honored by induction in the New Mexico State Athletics Hall of Fame

Name	Years	Awards and Achievements
Dr. Thomas Erhard	1960–95	PA Announcer; Hall of Fame Inductee (2006)
Jack Nixon	1976–81; 1986–Present	Voice of the Aggies, Radio Broadcaster; Hall of Fame Inductee (2014)

=== Awards ===
All-American
- Charlie Criss – 1969 (UPI First Team "Small Men")
- Sam Lacey – 1970 (Basketball News First Team)
- Jimmy Collins – 1970 (Helms First Team, USBWA First Team, Converse First Team)
- John Williamson – 1972 (Basketball News First Team)
- James Moore – 2003 (AP Honorable Mention)
- Daniel Mullings – 2014 (AP Honorable Mention)
- Pascal Siakam – 2016 (AP Honorable Mention)
- Ian Baker – 2017 (AP Honorable Mention)
- Jemerrio Jones – 2018 (AP Honorable Mention)

All-District
- Sam Lacey – 1970
- Jimmy Collins – 1970
- Albert 'Slab' Jones – 1979
- Jaime Pena – 1982
- Sam Crawford – 1993
- Rodney Walker – 1995
- James Moore – 2003
- Justin Hawkins – 2007, 2008
- Jahmar Young – 2009, 2010
- Troy Gillenwater – 2011
- Wendell McKines – 2012
- Daniel Mullings – 2014, 2015
- Pascal Siakam – 2015, 2016
- Ian Baker – 2017
- Jemerrio Jones – 2018
- Zach Lofton – 2018
- Trevelin Queen – 2020
- Teddy Allen – 2022

All-Stars
- Sam Lacey – 1970 (NABC Coaches All-Star)
- Jimmy Collins – 1970 (NABC Coaches All-Star)
- Roland Grant – 1974 (Liberty Bell Classic MVP)
- Richard Robinson – 1977 (NABC Coaches All-Star)
- Randy Brown – 1991 (NABC Coaches All-Star, Japan Classic)
- Sam Crawford – 1993 (NABC Coaches All-Star)
- Rodney Walker – 1995 (Final Four Slam Dunk Contest)

Academic All-American
- Eric Channing – 2000, 2001, 2002

Conference Coach of the Year
- Lou Henson – 1975 (MVC)
- Ken Hayes – 1977 (MVC)
- Weldon Drew – 1983 (MVC)
- Neil McCarthy – 1989, 1990 (Big West)
- Marvin Menzies – 2015 (WAC)
- Chris Jans – 2018, 2019, 2020 (WAC)

Conference Player of the Year
- James Moore – 2003 (Sun Belt)
- Daniel Mullings – 2014 (WAC)
- Pascal Siakam – 2016 (WAC)
- Ian Baker – 2017 (WAC)
- Jemerrio Jones – 2018 (WAC)
- Teddy Allen – 2022 (WAC)

All-Conference First Team (1935 to 1983)
- A.F. 'Hooky' Apodaca – 1935, 1936, 1937 (Border)
- Lauro Apodaca – 1937 (Border)
- Kiko Martinez – 1938, 1939 (Border)
- Pecos Finley – 1938 (Border)
- Joe Jackson – 1938, 1939 (Border)
- Morris Wood – 1938, 1939 (Border)
- Otis Shows – 1940 (Border)
- Marvin Hoover – 1940, 1941 (Border)
- David Sharp – 1948 (Border)
- Jim Tackett – 1951, 1952 (Border)
- Bob Priddy – 1952 (Border)
- Mike Svilar – 1952 (Border)
- Jim Loomis – 1956 (Border)
- Wayne Yates – 1958 (Border)
- Robert Jarrett – 1958 (Border)
- Billy Joe Price – 1959, 1961 (Border)
- George Knighton – 1960, 1961, 1962 (Border)
- Vincent Knight – 1960 (Border)
- Roland Grant – 1974 (MVC)
- Richard Robinson – 1975, 1977 (MVC)
- Jim Bostic – 1975 (MVC)
- Albert 'Slab' Jones – 1978, 1979, 1980 (MVC)
- Jaime Pena – 1982 (MVC)
- Ernest Patterson – 1983 (MVC)

All-Conference First Team (1984 to Present)
- Steve Colter – 1984 (Big West)
- Gilbert Wilburn – 1986 (Big West)
- Kenny Travis – 1987 (Big West)
- Johnny Roberson – 1989 (Big West)
- Keith Hill – 1990 (Big West)
- Randy Brown – 1990, 1991 (Big West)
- Reggie Jordan – 1991 (Big West)
- Sam Crawford – 1993 (Big West)
- James Dockery – 1994 (Big West)
- Rodney Walker – 1995 (Big West)
- Louis Richardson – 1997, 1998 (Big West)
- Charles Gosa – 1999 (Big West)
- Billy Keys – 2000 (Big West)
- Eric Channing – 2001 (Big West); 2001, 2002 (Sun Belt)
- James Moore – 2003, 2004 (Sun Belt)
- Justin Hawkins – 2007, 2008 (WAC)
- Jahmar Young – 2009, 2010 (WAC)
- Troy Gillenwater – 2011 (WAC)
- Wendell McKines – 2012 (WAC)
- Bandja Sy – 2013 (WAC)
- Daniel Mullings – 2014, 2015 (WAC)
- Pascal Siakam – 2015, 2016 (WAC)
- Ian Baker – 2017 (WAC)
- Jemerrio Jones – 2018 (WAC)
- Zach Lofton – 2018 (WAC)
- Terrell Brown – 2019 (WAC)
- Ivan Aurrecoechea – 2020 (WAC)
- Jabari Rice – 2020 (WAC)
- Teddy Allen – 2022 (WAC)

Conference Tournament MVP
- Sam Crawford – 1992 (Big West)
- James Dockery – 1994 (Big West)
- Billy Keys – 1999 (Big West)
- Justin Hawkins – 2007 (WAC)
- Jahmar Young – 2010 (WAC)
- Wendell McKines – 2012 (WAC)
- Sim Bhullar – 2013, 2014 (WAC)
- Tshilidzi Nephawe – 2015 (WAC)
- Ian Baker – 2017 (WAC)
- Jemerrio Jones – 2018 (WAC)
- Trevelin Queen – 2019 (WAC)
- Teddy Allen – 2022 (WAC)

Conference Freshman/Newcomer of the Year
- Albert 'Slab' Jones – 1977 (MVC)
- Robert Gunn – 1978 (MVC)
- Jaime Pena – 1981 (MVC)
- Charles Gosa – 1996 (Big West)
- James Moore – 2001 (Sun Belt)
- Sim Bhullar – 2013 (WAC)
- Pascal Siakam – 2015 (WAC)
- Teddy Allen – 2022 (WAC)

=== Aggies in the National Basketball Association ===
- Bill Allen – Anaheim, ABA, 1967–68
- Sim Bhullar – Sacramento, NBA, 2014–15
- Jim Bostic – Detroit, NBA, 1977–78
- Randy Brown – Sacramento, Chicago, Boston, Phoenix, NBA, 1991–2003
- Jimmy Collins – Chicago, NBA, 1970–72
- Steve Colter – Portland, Chicago, Philadelphia, Washington, Sacramento, Cleveland, NBA, 1984–91; 1994–95
- Charlie Criss – Atlanta, San Diego, Milwaukee, NBA, 1977–85
- Mike Dabich – Oakland, Dallas, ABA, 1967–68
- Jonathan Gibson – Dallas, Boston, NBA, 2016–18
- Jemerrio Jones – Los Angeles Lakers, NBA, 2019–2021
- Reggie Jordan – Los Angeles Lakers, Atlanta, Portland, Minnesota, Washington, NBA, 1993–94; 1995–2000
- Sam Lacey – Cincinnati, Kansas City, New Jersey, Cleveland, NBA, 1970–83
- Zach Lofton – Detroit, NBA, 2018–2019
- Bob Priddy – Baltimore, NBA, 1952–53
- Pascal Siakam – Toronto, Indiana, NBA, 2016–Present
- John Williamson – New York, ABA/NBA; Indiana, New Jersey, Washington, NBA, 1973–81

=== Famous Aggies ===
Players and coaches that had notable success before or after their time as an Aggie player or coach.

- Reggie Theus (2005–07, coach) – 14 year NBA career, coach of NBA Sacramento Kings, 2x NBA All-Star, #23 jersey retired by UNLV, assistant to Rick Pitino at Louisville (404 Wikilinks)
- Pascal Siakam (2014–16) – NBA Champion (2019), 4x NBA All-Star (2020, 2023, 2025, 2026), NBA Eastern Conference finals MVP (2025) All NBA 2nd Team (2020), All NBA 3rd Team (2022), NBA Most Improved Player (2019), 1st round NBA Draft pick (270 Wikilinks)
- Lou Henson (1953–55; 1966–75 & 1997–2005, coach) – 2x Final Four coach, coach at Illinois (1975–96), College Basketball Hall of Fame (241 Wikilinks)
- Randy Brown (1989–91) – 3x NBA Champion (1996–98), 12 year NBA career, 2nd round NBA Draft pick (169 Wikilinks)
- Sam Lacey (1967–70) – 14 year NBA career, #44 jersey retired by Royals/Kings organization, NBA All-Star (1975), 1st round NBA Draft pick (162 Wikilinks)
- Gary Ward (1959–62) – Oklahoma State baseball coach (1978–96) (159 Wikilinks)
- John Williamson (1971–73) – 2x ABA Champion (1974, 1976), #23 jersey retired by the Nets organization, 11 year ABA/NBA career (128 Wikilinks)
- Rob Evans (1966–68) – Ole Miss and Arizona State head coach (112 Wikilinks)
- Jimmy Collins (1967–70) – Illinois-Chicago coach, assistant to Lou Henson at Illinois (108 Wikilinks)
- Charlie Criss (1967–70) – 12 year NBA career (91 Wikilinks)

== Aggies in international leagues ==
- Jahmar Young (born 1986), basketball player in the Israeli National League

== All-Time Statistical leaders ==
=== 1000 Point Club ===
The 1000 Point Club consists of Aggies who have eclipsed 1000 points scored in their career. This is a notable accomplishment in college basketball. There are 35 Aggies that have reached this mark.

Rank	Player	Years played	Games	Points	Avg.
1	Eric Channing	1998–2002	124	1,862	15.0
2	Albert "Slab" Jones	1976–80	114	1,758	15.4
3	Jimmy Collins	1967–70	89	1,734	19.5
4	Daniel Mullings	2011–15	133	1,677	12.6
5	George Knighton	1959–62	75	1,660	22.1
6	James Moore	1999–03	110	1,651	15.0
7	Jonathan Gibson	2006–10	131	1,541	11.8
8	Richard Robinson	1973–77	100	1,540	15.4
9	Wendell McKines	2007–12	126	1,521	12.1
10	Jahmar Young	2007–10	87	1,479	17.0
11	Sam Lacey	1967–70	89	1,448	16.3
12	Ernest Patterson	1979–83	110	1,419	12.9
13	Ian Baker	2013–17	120	1,411	11.8
14	Steve Colter	1980–84	107	1,333	12.5
15	Charles Gosa	1995–99	117	1,233	10.5
16	Johnny Roberson	1985–89	121	1,223	10.1
17	Hernst Laroche	2008–12	135	1,209	9.0
18	Keith Hill	1986–90	115	1,201	10.4
19	John Williamson	1971–73	43	1,168	27.2
20	Billy Joe Price	1958–61	77	1,159	15.1
21	Greg Webb	1976–80	113	1,127	10.0
22	Justin Hawkins	2007–09	67	1,126	16.8
23	Pascal Siakam	2014–16	68	1,124	16.6
24	Jabari Rice	2018–22	111	1,106	10.0
25	Tshilidzi Nephawe	2010–15	136	1,087	8.0
26	Johnny McCants	2017–22	147	1,085	7.4
27	Hamidu Rahman	2008–12	124	1,081	8.7
28	Kenny Travis	1985–87	60	1,070	17.8
29	Gilbert Wilburn	1984–86	51	1,068	20.9
30	Troy Gillenwater	2008–11	70	1,065	15.2
31	Brandon Mason	1999–2003	115	1,051	9.1
32	Eli Chuha	2015–19	118	1,047	8.9
33	Jeff Smith	1968–71	87	1,045	12.0
34	Truman Ward	1970–73	76	1,037	13.6
35	Louis Richardson†	1996–98	57	1,025	18.0
36	Dexter Hawkins	1973–77	101	1,022	10.1
37	Bill Allen	1972–76	92	1,018	11.1
38	Billy Keys	1998–2000	65	1,004	15.4

† = official records stricken ‡ = active player

=== Other Statistics ===
Three Point FGs Made
Name	Years	3 Pt FGM	3 Pt FGA	3 Pt FG%
Eric Channing	1998–2002	283	627	.451
Jonathan Gibson	2006–2010	259	650	.398
Jeff McCool	1985–89	206	467	.441
Ian Baker	2013–17	200	542	.369
Denmark Reid	1996–1998	188	458	.410
Gordo Castillo	2007–2011	161	396	.407
Jahmar Young	2007–2010	156	421	.371
Braxton Huggins	2014–2017	133	351	.379
Elijah Ingram	2005–2007	127	317	.401
Brad Bestor	1998–2000	124	332	.374

Rebounds
Name	Years	Reb	Avg.
Sam Lacey	1967–1970	1,265	14.2
Wendell McKines	2007–2012	1,135	9.0
Albert 'Slab' Jones	1976–1980	951	8.3
George Knighton	1959–1962	866	11.5
Billy Joe Price	1958–1961	824	10.7
Charles Gosa	1995–1999	788	6.7
Tshilidzi Nephawe	2011–2015	775	8.0
Hamidu Rahman	2008–2012	737	5.9
Truman Ward	1970–1973	720	9.5
Jeff Smith	1968–1971	718	8.3

Assists
Name	Years	Assists
Sam Crawford	1991–1993	592
Hernst Laroche	2008–2012	552
Keith Hill	1987–1990	379
Ian Baker	2013–2017	378
Ernest Patterson	1980–1983	371
Steve Colter	1981–1984	347
Daniel Mullings	2012–2015	342
William Benjamin	1988–1992	333
Billy Keys	1998–2000	310
Brandon Mason	1999–2003	302

Blocked Shots
Name	Years	Blocks
James Moore	2000–2003	200
Sim Bhullar	2013–2015	196
Hamidu Rahman	2008–2012	137
Pascal Siakam	2014–2016	137
Tshilidzi Nephawe	2011–2015	135
Albert 'Slab' Jones	1976–1980	124
Charles Gosa	1995–1999	116
Johnny Roberson	1985–1989	98
Sam Lacey	1967–1970	92
Troy Gillenwater	2008–2011	82
Martin Iti	2006–2008	82

Steals
Name	Years	Steals
Daniel Mullings	2012–2015	249
Hernst Laroche	2008–2012	216
William Benjamin	1988–1992	209
James Moore	2000–2003	174
Randy Brown	1988–1992	162
Jonathan Gibson	2006–2010	132
Charles Gosa	1995–1999	126
Brandon Mason	1999–2003	123
Thomas Wyatt	1993–1995	119
Ernest Patterson	1980–1983	114
Eric Channing	1998–2002	114

Games Played
Name	Years	Games Played
Tshilidzi Nephawe	2011–2015	136
Hernst Laroche	2008–2012	135
Jonathan Gibson	2006–2010	131
Daniel Mullings	2012–2015	128
Wendell McKines	2007–2012	126
Eric Channing	1998–2002	124
Hamidu Rahman	2008–2012	124
William Benjamin	1988–1992	123
Aaron Brodt	1995–2000	122
Johnny Roberson	1986–1989	121
