= Greg Heiar =

American basketball coach (born 1975)

Current position
- Title: Head coach
- Team: Trinity Valley Community College

Biographical details
- Born: September 14, 1975 (age 51); Dubuque, Iowa, U.S.

Playing career
- 1996–1998: Kirkwood CC
- 1998–2000: Mount St. Clare

Coaching career (HC unless noted)
- 2000–2001: Mount St. Clare (assistant)
- 2001–2003: Loras College (assistant)
- 2003–2004: Chipola JC (assistant)
- 2004–2009: Chipola JC
- 2009–2011: Southern Miss (assistant)
- 2011–2017: Wichita State (assistant)
- 2017–2020: LSU (assistant)
- 2020–2021: ETSU (assistant)
- 2021–2022: NW Florida State
- 2022–2023: New Mexico State
- 2023–2024: Mineral Area College
- 2024–present: Trinity Valley Community College

Head coaching record
- Overall: 267–41 (.867)

Accomplishments and honors

Championships
- 5x Panhandle Conference Champions (2005–2009); 5x Panhandle Conference Coach of the Year; NJCAA Division National Champion (2022, 2025)

Greg Heiar (born August 14, 1975) is an American basketball coach who is the head coach of the Trinity Valley Community College men’s basketball team.

== Playing career ==
Heiar played college basketball for two seasons at Kirkwood Community College under Chris Jans, whom he succeeded as head coach at New Mexico State 25 years later. Heiar completed his playing career at Mount St. Clare, where he was a two-year captain, all-conference selection and team MVP.

== Coaching career ==
After graduation, Heiar assisted his alma mater for one season before joining the coaching staff at Loras College. He reunited with Jans at NJCAA institution Chipola College as an assistant coach for a season, before being elevated to the head coaching position. During the 2003-2004 season as an assistant coach, Heiar helped led Chipola College to a 32-5 overall record, including 11-1 in the Panhandle Conference. The team captured the college's first FCSAA/NJCAA Region VIII Championship for the first time in two decades, before finishing 6th in the NJCAA National Tournament in Hutchinson, Kansas. As a head coach at Chipola from 2004 to 2009, Heiar compiled a 164–15 record. During his time at Chipola, Heiar was named Panhandle Conference Coach of the Year five times (2005, 2006, 2007, 2008, 2009), NJCAA Region 8 Coach of the Year 4 times (2005, 2007, 2008, 2009) and led his time to NJCAA Final Four Appearances in 2005, 2007, and 2009; including runner-up finish in the NJCAA national championship game in 2007 to Grant McCasland's Midland College.

Following a third-place finish in the 2009 NJCAA Tournament, Heiar joined Larry Eustachy's staff at Southern Miss. In 2011, he joined the coaching staff of Gregg Marshall at Wichita State. At WSU, he was a part of seven NCAA tournament squads, including the Shockers' 2013 Final Four appearance. After Wichita, Heiar served as an assistant coach to Will Wade at LSU from 2017 to 2020. Heiar departed from LSU and served a one-year assistant coaching stint at East Tennessee State under coach Jason Shay. In 2021, Heiar returned to the junior college ranks, taking over at Northwest Florida State College, where his team won the NJCAA Division national tournament with a 31–5 record.

On March 27, 2022, Heiar was named the 27th head coach in New Mexico State men's basketball history, succeeding Jans, who had accepted the head coaching position at Mississippi State.

On November 19, 2022, Coach Heiar and his coaching staff were involved in the police response when one of his athletes, Mike Peake, was attacked in a premeditated plan by four University of New Mexico (UNM) students, resulting in the death of one of the UNM freshman students. The featured rivalry basketball game was canceled and the team returned to Las Cruces.

On February 10, 2023, Heiar and his staff were placed on administrative leave and the men’s basketball program was suspended until further notice after New Mexico State University announced an internal investigation for unspecified violations. It was later revealed that one of Heiar's players claimed to have been hazed by his teammates. As a result of the investigation, the men’s basketball program was suspended for the remainder of the season. On February 14, 2023, Heiar was fired as head coach. Heiar subsequently sued New Mexico State for wrongful termination, which was settled in 2025 under undisclosed terms.

For the 2023–24 season, Heiar was head coach at Mineral Area College, leading the team to a 29–3 season. On April 9, 2024, he announced that he would leave the institution for Trinity Valley Community College.

== Head coaching record ==
=== NCAA D1 ===
Record table
| Season | Team | Overall | Conference | Standing | Postseason |
|---|---|---|---|---|---|
New Mexico State Aggies (Western Athletic Conference) (2022–2023)
| 2022–23 | New Mexico State | 9–15 | 2–16 | | Season cancelled midseason |
| New Mexico State: | | 9–15 (.375) | 2–16 (.111) | | |
| Total: | | 9–15 (.375) | | | |
National champion Postseason invitational champion Conference regular season champion Conference regular season and conference tournament champion Division regular season champion Division regular season and conference tournament champion Conference tournament champion

=== NJCAA ===
Record table
| Season | Team | Overall | Conference | Standing | Postseason |
|---|---|---|---|---|---|
Chipola College (Panhandle Conference) (2004–2009)
| 2004–05 | Chipola JC | 33–4 | 10–2 | 1st | NJCAA Final Four (4th Place Finish) |
| 2005–06 | Chipola JC | 29–4 | 10–2 | 1st | FCSAA Champion Runner-Up |
| 2006–07 | Chipola JC | 33–3 | 10–2 | 1st | NJCAA National Champion Runner-Up |
| 2007–08 | Chipola JC | 35–2 | 11–1 | 1st | NJCAA Elite Eight (5th Place Finish) |
| 2008–09 | Chipola JC | 35–2 | 12–0 | 1st | NJCAA Final Four (3rd Place Finish) |
| Chipola JC: | | 165–15 (.917) | 53–7 (.883) | | |
NW Florida State (Panhandle Conference) (2021–2022)
| 2021–22 | NW Florida State | 31–5 | 9–3 | 1st | NJCAA D1 National Champions |
| NW Florida State: | | 31–5 (.861) | 9–3 (.750) | | |
Mineral Area College (Missouri Community College Athletic Conference) (2023–2024)
| 2023–24 | Mineral Area College | 29–3 | 12–2 | | |
| Mineral Area College: | | 29–3 (.906) | 12–2 (.857) | | |
Trinity Valley (Southwest Junior College Conference) (2024–Present)
| 2024–25 | Trinity Valley | 34–3 | 20–2 | | NJCAA D1 National Champions |
| 2025–26 | Trinity Valley | 30–6 | 18–4 | | NJCAA D1 Semifinalist |
| Trinity Valley: | | 64–9 (.877) | 38–6 (.864) | | |
| Total: | | 289–32 (.900) | | | |
National champion Postseason invitational champion Conference regular season champion Conference regular season and conference tournament champion Division regular season champion Division regular season and conference tournament champion Conference tournament champion
