= Rich Fuqua =

American basketball player (born 1950)

Personal information
- Born: November 11, 1950 (age 76) Chattanooga, Tennessee, U.S.
- Listed height: 6 ft 4 in (1.93 m)
- Listed weight: 180 lb (82 kg)

Career information
- High school: Riverside (Chattanooga, Tennessee)
- College: Oral Roberts (1969–1973)
- NBA draft: 1973: 4th round, 69th overall pick
- Drafted by: Boston Celtics
- Position: Shooting guard
- Number: 24

Career highlights
- Consensus second-team All-American (1972); Third-team All-American – AP (1973); No. 24 retired by Oral Roberts Golden Eagles
- Stats at Basketball Reference

Richard Fuqua (born November 11, 1950) is an American former college basketball stand-out who is best known for being an All-American in 1972 while playing for Oral Roberts. He is a native of Chattanooga, Tennessee and attended Riverside High School prior to college.

Between 1969 and 1973, Fuqua scored 3,004 points in a 111-game career. He averaged 31.8 points per game (ppg) as a sophomore, 35.9 ppg as a junior and 27.1 ppg for his career. In 1971–72, Fuqua's junior season, he finished second in the nation in scoring. Since Oral Roberts University did not gain NCAA Division I status until 1971 and because the school was an Independent (not affiliated with an athletic conference), Fuqua's career points and average totals do not go down in the men's basketball record books as Division I accomplishments. In February 1971, he scored 60 points in a game against the University of the South.

After his college career ended, Fuqua got drafted by the National Basketball Association (NBA)'s Boston Celtics in the 4th round (69th pick overall) of the 1973 NBA draft, but never played a game in the NBA.
