= Dick Acres =

American basketball player and coach

Biographical details
- Born: May 17, 1934; Santa Barbara, California, U.S.
- Died: June 14, 2012 (aged 78)

Playing career
- 1954–1956: UC Santa Barbara

Coaching career (HC unless noted)
- 1970–1982: Carson HS
- 1982: Oral Roberts (assistant)
- 1982–1985: Oral Roberts

Head coaching record
- Overall: 81–47 (.633)

Accomplishments and honors

Championships
- MCC regular season (1984); MCC tournament (1984)

Awards
- MCC co-Coach of the Year (1984)

Richard K. Acres (May 17, 1934 – June 14, 2012) was an American college basketball coach. He served as head men's coach of Oral Roberts University (ORU) for three seasons.

Acres played college basketball at UC Santa Barbara and semi-professionally for Kirby Shoes. He received a degree in education from UC Santa Barbara and later a master's degree from California State University, Los Angeles. After his playing career, he went into teaching, initially at Mark Twain High School.

Acres coached at Carson High School in California from 1970 to 1982, winning the state 4A title in his last season there. He then took an assistant coaching role at Oral Roberts for the 1982–83 season under Ken Hayes. With the move, Acres was able to coach two of his sons, who were already at ORU – Mark (who would later go on to play in the National Basketball Association) and Jeff – as well as Sam Potter, who had played for Acres at Carson High. In December of that season, after a disappointing 3–5 start, Hayes was fired and Acres was installed as interim head coach. After leading the team to an 11–9 record in his time as interim coach, Acres was given the full-time head coaching job during that offseason.

The following season, Acres led the Golden Eagles to a 21–10 record, Midwestern City Conference regular season and tournament championships, and was named conference co-coach of the year with Joe Sexson of Butler. In the 1984–85 season, Acres led the Golden Eagles to a 13–15 record and resigned at the end of the season.

Besides his coaching career, Acres served as a referee for basketball, football, and baseball at the high school level. He was also a financial services professional. Acres died on June 14, 2012.

== Head coaching record ==
Record table
Season	Team	Overall	Conference	Standing	Postseason
Oral Roberts Titans (Midwestern City Conference) (1982–1985)
1982–83	Oral Roberts	11–9	10–4	T–2nd	
1983–84	Oral Roberts	21–10	11–3	1st	NCAA First Round
1984–85	Oral Roberts	15–15	8–6	T–3rd	
Oral Roberts:		50–39 (.562)	29–13 (.690)		
Total:		50–39 (.562)			
National champion Postseason invitational champion Conference regular season champion Conference regular season and conference tournament champion Division regular season champion Division regular season and conference tournament champion Conference tournament champion
