= Mark Acres =

American basketball player (born 1962)

Personal information
- Born: November 15, 1962 (age 63) Inglewood, California, U.S.
- Listed height: 6 ft 11 in (2.11 m)
- Listed weight: 220 lb (100 kg)

Career information
- High school: Palos Verdes (Palos Verdes Estates, California)
- College: Oral Roberts (1981–1985)
- NBA draft: 1985: 2nd round, 40th overall pick
- Drafted by: Dallas Mavericks
- Playing career: 1985–1998
- Position: Power forward / center
- Number: 42

Career history
- 1985: Divarese Varese
- 1986–1987: Mariembourg
- 1987–1989: Boston Celtics
- 1989–1992: Orlando Magic
- 1992: Houston Rockets
- 1993: Washington Bullets
- 1997–1998: Benfica

Career highlights
- MCC co-Player of the Year (1983); 3× First-team All-MCC (1983–1985); Second-team All-MCC (1982); MCC Rookie of the Year (1982); No. 42 retired by Oral Roberts Golden Eagles; McDonald's All-American (1981); Second-team Parade All-American (1981)
- Stats at NBA.com
- Stats at Basketball Reference

Mark Richard Acres (born November 15, 1962) is an American former professional basketball player who spent most of his career in the National Basketball Association (NBA). He was a 6'11", 220 lb (100 kg) power forward/center.

Acres attended Palos Verdes High School in Palos Verdes Estates, California, and was selected as a Parade All-American and played in the 1981 McDonald's All-American Game. Acres played college basketball for the Oral Roberts Golden Eagles under his father Dick, and alongside his brother Jeff. He was selected as the Midwestern City Conference Player of the Year as a sophomore in 1983.

Acres was selected in the second round of the 1985 NBA draft by the Dallas Mavericks. The Mavericks trialled Acres during summer camp but convinced him to play professionally in Europe for development. He was signed by the Boston Celtics as a free agent after two seasons in Europe. Acres was selected by the Orlando Magic in the 1989 NBA expansion draft.

Acres was inducted into the Oral Roberts University Athletics Hall of Fame in 2003.

== NBA career statistics ==
Legend
GP	Games played	GS	Games started	MPG	Minutes per game
FG%	Field goal percentage	3P%	3-point field goal percentage	FT%	Free throw percentage
RPG	Rebounds per game	APG	Assists per game	SPG	Steals per game
BPG	Blocks per game	PPG	Points per game	**Bold**	Career high

=== Regular season ===
Year	Team	GP	GS	MPG	FG%	3P%	FT%	RPG	APG	SPG	BPG	PPG
1987–88	Boston	79	5	14.6	.532	.000	.640	3.4	.5	.4	.3	3.6
1988–89	Boston	62	0	10.2	.482	**1.000**	.542	2.4	.3	.3	.1	2.2
1989–90	Orlando	**80**	**50**	**21.1**	.484	.750	.692	**5.4**	**.8**	**.5**	.3	**4.5**
1990–91	Orlando	68	0	19.3	.509	.333	.653	5.3	.4	.4	**.4**	4.2
1991–92	Orlando	68	6	13.6	.517	.333	**.761**	3.7	.3	.4	.2	3.1
1992–93	Houston	6	0	3.8	.222	.500	.500	1.0	.0	.0	.0	1.0
1992–93	Washington	12	7	20.5	**.600**	.000	.714	5.1	.4	.3	.5	4.8
Career		375	68	16.0	.506	.538	.665	4.1	.5	.4	.3	3.6

=== Playoffs ===
Year	Team	GP	GS	MPG	FG%	3P%	FT%	RPG	APG	SPG	BPG	PPG
1987–88	Boston	**17**	–	**9.3**	**.538**	.000	**.500**	**2.1**	**.1**	**.1**	**.1**	**2.2**
1988–89	Boston	2	–	1.0	.000	.000	.000	.5	.0	.0	.0	.0
Career		19	–	8.4	.519	.000	.500	1.9	.1	.1	.1	1.9

== Personal life ==
Acres is a Christian and was encouraged to attend Oral Roberts University by his parents for its "Christian atmosphere."

== See also ==
- List of NCAA Division I men's basketball players with 2000 points and 1000 rebounds
