= Ken Hayes =

American men's basketball coach

Biographical details
- Born: 1931 (age 94–95); Braggs, Oklahoma, U.S.
- Education: Northeastern State (1956)

Coaching career (HC unless noted)
- 1956–1958: Bradley HS
- 1958–1959: Stilwell HS
- 1959–1964: Bacone JC
- 1965–1968: Tulsa (asst.)
- 1968–1975: Tulsa
- 1975–1979: New Mexico State
- 1979–1982: Oral Roberts
- 1983–1997: Northeastern State

Accomplishments and honors

Records
- 460–329 (.583)

Ken Hayes (born 1931) was the head men's basketball coach at Tulsa (1968–75), New Mexico State (1975–79), Oral Roberts (1979–82) and Northeastern State (1983–97). Hayes was inducted into the Tulsa University Athletics Hall of Fame (2008), the Northeastern State Athletics Hall of Fame (1999), and the Bacone College Athletics Hall of Fame (2013).

== Head coaching record ==
Record table
Season	Team	Overall	Conference	Standing	Postseason
Tulsa Golden Hurricane (Missouri Valley Conference) (1968–1975)
1968–69	Tulsa	19–8	11–5	3rd	NIT First Round
1969–70	Tulsa	15–11	8–8	5th	
1970–71	Tulsa	17–9	8–6	T–4th	
1971–72	Tulsa	15–11	5–9	6th	
1972–73	Tulsa	18–8	10–4	T–3rd	
1973–74	Tulsa	18–8	7–6	T–3rd	
1974–75	Tulsa	15–14	5–9	6th	
Tulsa:		117–69 (.629)	54–47 (.535)		
New Mexico State Aggies (Missouri Valley Conference) (1975–1979)
1975–76	New Mexico State	15–12	4–8	T–4th	
1976–77	New Mexico State	17–10	8–4	T–1st	
1977–78	New Mexico State	15–14	9–7	4th	
1978–79	New Mexico State	22–10	11–5	2nd	NCAA First Round
New Mexico State:		69–46 (.600)	32–24 (.571)		
Oral Roberts Titans (Midwestern City Conference) (1979–1982)
1979–80	Oral Roberts	18–10	4–1	2nd	
1980–81	Oral Roberts	11–16	6–5	T–4th	
1981–82	Oral Roberts	18–12	8–4	T–2nd	NIT First Round
1982–83	Oral Roberts	3–5	0–0		
Oral Roberts:		50–43 (.538)	28–14 (.667)		
Northeastern State Redmen (Oklahoma Intercollegiate Conference) (1983–1997)
1983–84	Northeastern State	17–10			
1984–85	Northeastern State	26–3			
1985–86	Northeastern State	15–13			
1986–87	Northeastern State	20–8			
1987–88	Northeastern State	16–11			
1988–89	Northeastern State	12–15			
1989–90	Northeastern State	4–23			
1990–91	Northeastern State	20–9			
1991–92	Northeastern State	19–10			
1992–93	Northeastern State	16–12			
1993–94	Northeastern State	19–10			
1994–95	Northeastern State	8–22			
1995–96	Northeastern State	19–10			
1996–97	Northeastern State	13–15			
Northeastern State:		224–171 (.567)			
Total:		460–329 (.583)			
National champion Postseason invitational champion Conference regular season champion Conference regular season and conference tournament champion Division regular season champion Division regular season and conference tournament champion Conference tournament champion
