= Oral Roberts Golden Eagles men's basketball =

Men's university basketball team in Tulsa, Oklahoma

2026–27 Oral Roberts Golden Eagles men's basketball team
- University: Oral Roberts University
- Head coach: Kory Barnett (2nd season)
- Location: Tulsa, Oklahoma
- Arena: Mabee Center (capacity: 10,575)
- Conference: Summit League
- Nickname: Golden Eagles
- Colors: Navy blue, Vegas gold, and white

NCAA Division I tournament Elite Eight
- 1974
Other NCAA Division I tournament results
Sweet Sixteen	1974, 2021
Appearances	1974, 1984, 2006, 2007, 2008, 2021, 2023

Conference tournament champions
- MCC: 1980, 1984; Summit: 2006, 2007, 2008, 2021, 2023

Conference regular-season champions
- MCC: 1984; Summit: 2005, 2006, 2007, 2008, 2012, 2023

Uniforms
Home	Away	Alternate

The Oral Roberts Golden Eagles men's basketball team is the basketball team representing Oral Roberts University in Tulsa, Oklahoma. The team is a member of Summit League.

Oral Roberts has made appearances in seven NCAA Tournaments, the most recent appearance in 2023. The team has also appeared in eight National Invitation Tournaments, one College Basketball Invitational, and two CollegeInsider.com Postseason Tournaments. The Golden Eagles have won seven regular season conference championships and six tournament championships. The team has been members of the Southland Conference and the Midwestern Collegiate Conference.

In the opening round of the 2021 tournament, the Golden Eagles recorded just the ninth 15 vs. 2 upset in tournament history, defeating Ohio State 75–72 in overtime, in the process winning their first tournament game since 1974. Two days later, they became just the second 15 seed (after the 2013 Florida Gulf Coast Eagles) to advance to the Sweet Sixteen, after defeating #7 Florida 81–78.

On April 10, 2017, the school fired all-time winningest coach Scott Sutton after 18 years. He finished with an overall record of 328–247. The school named Paul Mills as the new head coach on April 28.

Prior to the 1993–94 season, ORU was known as the Titans. The Golden Eagles and Tulsa Golden Hurricane exchange a traveling trophy, the Mayor's Cup, in the two teams' crosstown rivalry.

== Postseason play ==
=== NCAA tournament results ===
The Golden Eagles have appeared in seven NCAA tournaments. Their combined record is 4–7.

Year	Seed	Round	Opponent	Result
1974		First Round; Sweet Sixteen; Elite Eight	Syracuse; Louisville; Kansas	W 86–82^{OT} W 96–93; L 90–93^{OT}
1984	11	First Round	(6) Memphis State	L 83–92
2006	16	First Round	(1) Memphis	L 78–94
2007	14	First Round	(3) Washington State	L 54–70
2008	13	First Round	(4) Pittsburgh	L 63–82
2021	15	First Round; Second Round; Sweet Sixteen	(2) Ohio State (7) Florida (3) Arkansas	W 75–72^{OT} W 81–78; L 70–72
2023	12	First Round	(5) Duke	L 51–74

==== 1974 NCAA Tournament ====
ORU, in just its eighth season of varsity competition, made the big show and almost stole the show, coming within three points of advancing to the Final Four. The Titans finished the regular season 21–5 before receiving the NCAA bid and then proceeded to knock off Syracuse 86–82 in overtime in the sub-Regional in Denton, Texas in the first round and Louisville 96–93 at the Mabee Center to move on to the Elite Eight. ORU's dream season came to an end on its home floor, however, as Kansas overcame a nine-point deficit in the game's final minutes to send it to overtime, where the Jayhawks won 93–90. ORU, at 23–6, won 20-plus games for the fifth straight season, closing out Ken Trickey's five-year coaching stay with an incredible 118–23 record. ORU averaged 94.6 points, the fifth straight season over the 90-point mark under Trickey, whose running style helped revolutionize offensive basketball from then on. Junior guard Sam McCants paced the Titans with a 24.0 scoring average, while senior forward Eddie Woods completed a standout four-year career by leading the team with a 12.1 rebounding average. The Titans finished 18th in the final Associated Press ranking, the second time in three years placing in the Top Twenty.

==== 1984 NCAA Tournament ====
Visions of the final-eight Titans of ten years earlier danced in the heads of the 1983–84 Titans as ORU advanced to the NCAA Tournament after winning the Midwestern Collegiate Conference postseason party with a 68–66 decision over Xavier. The Titans had won the regular season conference title with an 11–3 record and then took all three games in the MCC tourney to gain the right to play Memphis State in Memphis, Tenn., in first-round NCAA play. ORU, behind junior center Mark Acres' 28 points, gave Memphis State all it could handle but eventually bowed in defeat 92–83 to the homestanding Tigers. Acres, the MCC Player of the Year, was on his way to his third straight All-American season in which he would finish with team leading averages of 20.8 points and 10.5 rebounds. He was not alone during ORU's march to the NCAA Tournament, receiving support from junior teammates Sam Potter (18.1 ppg) and Jeff Acres (15.0), his older brother who bounced back from a redshirt season to play a key role in the Titans' resurgence. ORU, which opened the season with a 4–5 start, turned things around the rest of the way, posting a 17–4 record on its way to the MCC crown.

==== 2006 NCAA Tournament ====
One year after coming so close to reaching their first NCAA Tournament in over 20 years, the Golden Eagles finally advanced to the Big Dance. Plagued by injuries to key players throughout the season, the Golden Eagles rallied down the regular-season's home stretch, tying IUPUI for the Mid-Continent Conference regular season title on the final day. ORU again earned the No. 1 seed for the Mid-Con Tournament and this time, there was no miracle, last-second shot in the title game. ORU romped by Chicago State, 85–72, in the title game in Tulsa, earning the school's first NCAA Tournament berth in 22 years. Junior guard Ken Tutt, who earlier missed 10 conference games with a broken foot, earned Tournament MVP honors. Despite being a 16 seed for the NCAA Tournament, the Golden Eagles were much-ballyhooed in the days leading up to their meeting with No. 1 seed Memphis, with some so-called "experts" labeling the Golden Eagles as the best No. 16 seed ever. ORU gave the Tigers a good tussle, but eventually came up short in Dallas. Junior forward Caleb Green once again enjoyed a tremendous season, claiming his second straight Mid-Con Player of the Year honor, and once again earning honorable mention All-America honors from the AP. The Golden Eagles enjoyed significant nationwide exposure, playing on national television three different times, including a 68–48 win over Southern Cal on ESPN2 while at the Great Alaska Shootout. The Golden Eagles kept the Mayor's Cup at the Mabee Center for the third straight season with a 62–48 defeat of Tulsa.

==== 2007 NCAA Tournament ====
With seniors Green and Tutt leading the way, the Golden Eagles made history by becoming the first ORU team to reach consecutive NCAA Tournaments. Green, who became the Mid-Continent Conference's all-time leader in points and rebounds, earned conference player of the year for the third time and captured Mid-Con Tournament MVP honors. But it was Tutt's clutch shooting which carried the Golden Eagles to the tournament title. Tutt banked in a running jumper with 31 seconds remaining to give ORU a come-from behind victory over Oakland and a second straight NCAA Tournament berth. The basket not only gave ORU a title, but also put Tutt at 2,000 career points, making him and Green just the seventh duo in NCAA history to reach 2,000 together. But it was not just post-season success which the Golden Eagles enjoyed. On November 15, ORU enjoyed the biggest regular-season victory in school history with a shocking 78–71 win at No. 3 Kansas. Marchello Vealy, who later won Mid-Con Sixth Man of the Year honors, scored a career-high 22 points off the bench, hitting seven consecutive three-pointers during the game.

==== 2008 NCAA Tournament ====
With the loss of 2,000-point scorers Caleb Green and Ken Tutt, it seemed unlikely for the Golden Eagles to repeat as Summit League champions for the fourth consecutive year. However, a foursome of unheralded seniors and a high-scoring newcomer helped propel ORU to the unlikeliest of championship seasons. Seniors Moses Ehambe, Shawn King, Adam Liberty and Yemi Ogunoye guided ORU to a 24–9 overall record and a 16–2 conference record, which included a record 13–0 start. The best defense in school history propelled the Golden Eagles to regular season wins over Tulsa and Oklahoma State. Head coach Scott Sutton was named Summit League Coach of the Year. Junior guard Robert Jarvis sparked ORU's offense off the bench, leading the nation's reserves in scoring at 16.1 points per game on his way to Summit League Sixth Man of the Year. Ogunoye, a defensive stalwart for five seasons, earned Summit League Defensive Player of the Year, and Ehambe, on the strength of a record eight three-pointers in the opening round and 25 points in the championship game, earned Summit League tournament MVP honors.

==== 2021 NCAA Tournament ====
Seeded fourth in the Summit League tournament, the Golden Eagles topped North Dakota before nabbing upset wins over top-seeded South Dakota State and North Dakota State in the respective semifinal and championship rounds. A crucial block and steal by Francis Lācis with two seconds remaining in the latter game allowed the Golden Eagles to escape with a 75–72 victory and reach their first NCAA men's basketball tournament in 13 years. Placed in a No. 15 seed in the South region, ORU went on to pull off a shocking upset of the No. 2 seed and Big Ten runner-up Ohio State Buckeyes in a 75–72 overtime triumph. Kevin Obanor and Max Abmas combined for 59 points in the victory. The Golden Eagles beat the Florida Gators 81–78 to advance to the Sweet Sixteen, becoming just the second No. 15 seed to advance to the regional semifinal round (and first since Florida Gulf Coast in 2013). But against the Arkansas Razorbacks, they fell by a 72–70 final which caused their run to end.

=== NAIA results ===
Oral Roberts competed in one NAIA tournament. They finished with a record of 2–1.

Year	Seed	Round	Opponent	Result
1990	3	First round Second round Elite Eight	The King's (NY); Columbia (MO) (11) Georgetown (KY)	W 93–79; W 106–86; L 78–80

=== NIT results ===
The Golden Eagles have appeared in eight National Invitation Tournaments (NIT). Their combined record is 2–8.

Year	Round	Opponent	Result
1972	First round Quarterfinals	Memphis State; St. John's	W 94–74; L 78–94
1973	First round	North Carolina	L 65–82
1975	First round Quarterfinals	Memphis State; Oregon	W 97–95; L 59–68
1977	First round	Oregon	L 89–90
1982	First round	Oklahoma	L 73–81
1997	First round	Notre Dame	L 58–74
2005	First round	Maryland	L 72–85
2012	First round	Nevada	L 59–68

==== 1972 NIT ====
ORU's first postseason team ever, the 1971–72 edition of the 'run-and-gun' Titans featured: guard Richard Fuqua, who would finish second in the nation among small-college players in scoring with a 35.9 average; forward Eddie Woods, who averaged 14.5 rebounds per game, still an ORU single-season high; forward Sam McCamey, ORU's first draftee when he was selected in the eighth round of the 1972 draft by Boston; and guard Eldon Lawyer, Fuqua's running mate. The team won four straight games to open the season before losing at Murray State 94–87 on Dec. 18. ORU then reeled off a school record 22 wins in a row, the last being a 94–74 drubbing of Memphis State at Madison Square Garden in the opening round of the NIT. ORU's season and win streak came to an end three nights later when the Titans lost to St. John's 94–78. The 1971–72 team, which topped the century mark in scoring 20 times in 28 games, led the nation offensively with a 105.1 points per game average and in rebounding at 60.2 boards per game. ORU finished 16th in the final Associated Press ranking.

==== 1973 NIT ====
Making a second consecutive appearance in the NIT, the 1972–73 ORU Titans posted a final record of 21–6, marking the fourth straight 20–win season for the university. Headlining the 1972–73 edition was senior guard Richard Fuqua, who led the team for the fourth straight year in scoring with a 23.5 average. Sophomore center David Vaughn steered the team with Fuqua. He posted averages of 19.2 points and 14.3 rebounds to earn All-American honors along with Fuqua. Both players were drafted following the season, with Fuqua going to Boston and Vaughn to Virginia in the ABA. For the second consecutive year, ORU led the nation in scoring, averaging 97.3 points per outing, while scoring 100 or more points in a contest 11 times. The Titans also ranked first nationally in field-goal attempts per game (98.5) and in rebound margin (+15.3). The 1972–73 team average of 65.9 rebounds per game still stands as a school record. The 1972–73 season did mark the end of ORU's school-record 52-game home winning streak when Marshall defeated the Titans 106–103 on Feb. 10 in the Homecoming game. The streak had dated back to Feb. 17, 1969, when the Titans played in the old Dome on campus. ORU's appearance in the NIT came to an abrupt 82–65 end at the hands of North Carolina at the Garden.

==== 1975 NIT ====
The Titans did not skip a beat under new head coach Jerry Hale, posting a 20–8 record and advancing to postseason play for the fourth straight year. The team's appearance in the NIT at Madison Square Garden marked the third time in four seasons in the postseason classic for the Titans, who nipped Memphis State 97–95 in the first round before losing a hard-fought battle to Oregon 68–59 four nights later. Sophomore forward Anthony Roberts blossomed into an offensive force and gave an extended glimpse of things to come by averaging 22.4 points per game to lead the team. Roberts had averaged just 5.2 points per outing in limited action the year before. He was followed closely by fellow sophomore Arnold Dugger, who averaged 17.1 points in his first season with the Titans after coming to ORU with Hale from the junior college level. Roberts and Dugger would each earn All-American honors at the end of the season, with Roberts being named to the Independent First Team squad. The team's 20–8 record marked the sixth consecutive 20-plus win campaign and included wins over Texas A&M, Jacksonville and Southern Illinois.

==== 1977 NIT ====
ORU returned to the NIT for the fourth time in six years on the strength of a 21–6 regular season record. Unfortunately, the team's appearance in the NIT was short-lived as Oregon spoiled a record-setting performance by senior forward Anthony 'Woosie' Roberts in a thrilling 90–89 win over the Titans at the Mabee Center. Roberts, who completed the season as the nation's second-leading scorer with a 34.0 average, blistered the Ducks for 65 points in the NIT loss, setting a single-game tournament high that still stands today. Woosie, who also averaged 9.2 rebounds while shooting 54.4 percent, earned consensus All-American honors for his senior-season heroics. Joining Roberts to form ORU's Titan-ic trio were senior guard Arnold Dugger and senior forward Alvin Scott. Dugger concluded the season with 501 career assists and still holds the record while accomplishing the feat in just three seasons. Scott swatted away a team-leading 81 shots and led the team in rebounding with a 9.5 average. His season block total is an ORU record. Roberts, Dugger and Scott were all drafted in 1977, with Roberts going in the first round to Denver. Scott, picked by Phoenix in the seventh round, enjoyed a long career with the Suns.

==== 1982 NIT ====
Five years to the day of the 1977 Titans' 90–89 loss to Oregon, ORU was back in the NIT, hosting state rival Oklahoma at the Mabee Center. The Sooners put a damper on the anniversary festivities with an 81–73 victory, spoiling the Titans' fifth appearance overall in the NIT. ORU, coming off an 11–16 season in 1980–81, relied on the contributions of both young and old throughout the campaign. Freshman center Mark Acres became just the third first-year player to lead the team in scoring, joining Dana Lewis in 1967–68 and Richard Fuqua in 1969–70, by averaging 14.6 points per game. Acres also paced the Titans in rebounding with an 8.1 average. Senior guard Gary 'Cat' Johnson finished second behind Acres with a 14.2 scoring mark and sophomore forward Lester Gill placed third with 12.2 ppg. Acres earned AP honorable mention All-American accolades for his efforts. The Titans, in their third season under head coach Ken Hayes, opened the season 7–3 and used that momentum to overcome injuries and a tough conference slate to qualify for the NIT berth.

==== 1997 NIT ====
Oral Roberts advanced to Division I postseason play for the first time since 1983–84 and the first time as the Golden Eagles. With the leadership of four seniors and the impressive play of junior sensation shooting guard Tim Gill, Head Coach Bill Self led his team to a postseason berth for the first time under his direction in the fourth and last season of his tenure as head coach. ORU's final regular season record was 21–6, and this was the Golden Eagles' final year as an independent. Victories over such teams as No. 16 Arkansas, nationally ranked Tulsa and established Oklahoma State were not enough to give ORU an at-large bid to the NCAA Tournament, but the National Invitation Tournament did extend a bid. The Eagles gladly accepted and headed up to South Bend, Indiana, to face Notre Dame and Big East player of the year Pat Garrity on March 12, 1997. ORU went into the game with wins in 12 of its last 13 games, but whatever the reason, the Golden Eagles did not show up to play against the Fighting Irish. Notre Dame only led by six at the half (35–29), but extended its lead to as many as 18 points in the second period (74–56 at 0:15) and ended up winning by 16, 74–58. Gill still led all scorers in the contest with 21 points.

==== 2005 NIT ====
A much-anticipated season culminated with a post-season tournament berth, though it was not the tournament the Golden Eagles had hoped for. Following a 23-win regular season, a Mid-Continent Conference regular season title and a pair of wins in the Mid-Con Tournament, the Golden Eagles were stunned in the Mid-Con finals by Oakland, losing 61–60 at John Q. Hammons Arena in Tulsa. The Golden Eagles accepted a bid to the NIT—their first post-season berth in eight years—and lost 85–72 at Maryland in a nationally televised first-round game. Caleb Green enjoyed a monster sophomore season, earning Mid-Con Player of the Year honors and also capturing Associated Press All-America (HM) honors, the first ORU All-American in over 20 years. Head coach Scott Sutton was honored as the NABC District 12 co-Coach of the Year, sharing the honor with his father, Oklahoma State's Eddie Sutton. ORU picked up several impressive wins, most notably a defeat of Georgetown in the Hawaii Rainbow Classic, and an ESPN Bracket Buster win at Southwest Missouri State. The Golden Eagles handed Tulsa a record-setting 70–47 defeat in the annual Mayor's Cup game.

==== 2012 NIT ====
The Golden Eagles went 17–1 in The Summit League to be regular season champions but failed to win the Summit League Basketball tournament. As regular season conference champions, they received an automatic bid into the NIT. They lost to WAC regular season champion Nevada in the first round to finish the season 27–7.

=== CBI results ===
The Golden Eagles have appeared in the College Basketball Invitational (CBI) one time. Their record is 1–1.

Year	Round	Opponent	Result
2015	First round Quarterfinals	UC Santa Barbara; Loyola–Chicago	W 62–59; L 78–86

=== CIT results ===
The Golden Eagles have appeared in two CollegeInsider.com Postseason Tournaments (CIT). Their combined record is 2–2.

Year	Round	Opponent	Result
2011	First round	SMU	L 57–64^{OT}
2013	First round Second round Quarterfinals	Texas–Arlington; UC Irvine; Weber State	W 87–76; W 76–62; L 74–83

== Notable players ==
=== Retired numbers ===
The Golden Eagles have retired three numbers in program history.

Oral Roberts Golden Eagles retired numbers
No.	Player	Pos.	Career	Ref.
15	Anthony Roberts	SF / SG	1973–1977	
24	Rich Fuqua	SG	1969–1973	
42	Mark Acres	PF / C	1981–1985	

=== NBA/ABA players ===
- Mark Acres (Boston Celtics, Orlando Magic, Houston Rockets, Washington Bullets)
- Calvin Garrett (Houston Rockets, Los Angeles Lakers)
- DaQuan Jeffries (Sacramento Kings)
- Larry Owens (San Antonio Spurs, Washington Wizards, New Jersey Nets)
- Anthony Roberts (Denver Nuggets, Washington Bullets)
- Alvin Scott (Phoenix Suns)
- Greg Sutton (San Antonio Spurs, Charlotte Hornets, Philadelphia 76ers)
- David Vaughn (Virginia Squires)
- Haywoode Workman (Atlanta Hawks, Washington Bullets, Indiana Pacers, Milwaukee Bucks, Toronto Raptors)

=== International league players ===
- Deondre Burns, the Israeli Basketball Premier League
- Dominique Morrison, the Superliga Profesional de Baloncesto

== Head coaches ==
- Kory Barnett (2025-
- Russell Springmann (2023–2025)
- Paul Mills (2017–2023)
- Scott Sutton (1999–2017)
- Barry Hinson (1997–1999)
- Bill Self (1993–1997)
- Ken Trickey (1987–1993)
- Ted Owens (1985–1987)
- Dick Acres (1982–1985)
- Ken Hayes (1979–1982)
- Lake Kelly (1977–1979)
- Jerry Hale (1974–1977)
- Ken Trickey (1969–1974)
- Bill White (1965–1969)

== Mabee Center ==
The Mabee Center has been home to the Golden Eagles since 1972. The arena bears the name of John and Lottie Mabee, who established the Tulsa-based Mabee Foundation in 1948. The benevolences of this foundation are evident throughout the Southwest where many edifices bear the name. Mabee Center was built as an elliptical cable-suspension structure with basketball in mind. The arena has 10,575 permanent theater seats - with no obstacles to clear viewing. Recently, four luxury suites were added on the south side or directly behind the team benches. The arena has drawn nine different national tournaments since the building opened. The Golden Eagles themselves played in the first NCAA tournament held here in 1974. Four other NCAA regionals (1975, 1978, 1982 and 1985) have been based at the Mabee Center. The National Invitation Tournament picked ORU as host four times (1977, 1980, 1982 and 1983). Mabee Center also annually hosts the Oklahoma state high school playoffs and the Oklahoma Coaches Association All-Star games. It was also the former site of the NAIA National Basketball Championship. Mabee Center regularly plays host to various conventions, conferences, seminars, and special events such as the annual Miss Oklahoma pageant. In the past, Mabee Center has hosted performers including Elvis Presley, Garth Brooks, Willie Nelson, Reba McEntire and Blue Man Group.
