= Oakland Golden Grizzlies men's basketball statistical leaders =

The Oakland Golden Grizzlies men's basketball statistical leaders are individual statistical leaders of the Oakland Golden Grizzlies men's basketball program in various categories, including points, assists, blocks, rebounds, and steals. Within those areas, the lists identify single-game, single-season, and career leaders. The Golden Grizzlies represent Oakland University in the National Collegiate Athletic Association's (NCAA) Horizon League.

Oakland began competing in intercollegiate basketball in 1967. The NCAA did not officially record assists as a stat until the 1983–84 season, and blocks and steals until the 1985–86 season, but Oakland's record books include players in these stats before these seasons.

These lists are through the 2024–25 season.

Current players are listed in bold.

== Scoring ==
Career
Rk	Player	Points	Seasons
1	Carvin Melson	2,408	1969–70 1970–71 1971–72 1972–73
2	Travis Bader	2,351	2010–11 2011–12 2012–13 2013–14
3	Mike Helms	2,314	2000–01 2001–02 2002–03 2003–04
4	Eric Taylor	2,210	1988–89 1989–90 1990–91 1991–92
5	Keith Benson	1,903	2007–08 2008–09 2009–10 2010–11
6	Tom Eller	1,852	1990–91 1991–92 1992–93 1993–94
7	Chris Howze	1,814	1982–83 1983–84 1984–85 1985–86
8	Trey Townsend	1,813	2020–21 2021–22 2022–23 2023–24
9	Jalen Hayes	1,807	2013–14 2014–15 2015–16 2016–17 2017–18
10	Scott Bittinger	1,806	1984–85 1985–86 1986–87 1987–88

Season
Rk	Player	Points	Season
1	Reggie Hamilton	942	2011–12
2	Kay Felder	853^{[c]}	2015–16
3	Kendrick Nunn	777	2017–18
4	Mike Helms	752	2002–03
5	Scott Bittinger	740	1987–88
6	Travis Bader	730	2012–13
7	Carvin Melson	708	1971–72
8	Mike Helms	695	2003–04
9	Carvin Melson	693	1972–73
10	Eric Taylor	683	1990–91

Single game
Rk	Player	Points	Season	Opponent
1	Chris Howze	52	1985–86	UM-Dearborn
2	Carvin Melson	48	1971–72	Grand Valley State
3	Travis Bader	47	2012–13	IUPUI
4	Mike Helms	45	2001–02	Western Michigan

== Rebounds ==
Career
Rk	Player	Rebounds	Seasons
1	Carvin Melson	1,204	1969–70 1970–71 1971–72 1972–73
2	Keith Benson	1,103	2007–08 2008–09 2009–10 2010–11
3	Corey Petros	1,073	2011–12 2012–13 2013–14 2014–15
4	Jalen Hayes	966	2013–14 2014–15 2015–16 2016–17 2017–18
5	Kevin Williams	924	1972–73 1973–74 1974–75 1975–76
6	Trey Townsend	889	2020–21 2021–22 2022–23 2023–24
7	Ronald Brown	866	1969–70 1970–71 1971–72 1972–73
8	Derick Nelson	849	2005–06 2006–07 2007–08 2009–10
9	Tom Eller	827	1990–91 1991–92 1992–93 1993–94
10	Mike Mohn	779	1980–81 1981–82 1982–83 1983–84

Season
Rk	Player	Rebounds	Season
1	Keith Benson	367	2009–10
2	Keith Benson	354	2010–11
3	Kevin Williams	340	1975–76
4	Carvin Melson	326	1971–72
5	Jamal Cain	307	2021–22
	Matt McClellan	307	1996–97
7	Tom Allan	297	1968–69
8	Carvin Melson	296	1970–71
9	Carvin Melson	294	1972–73
10	Tom Allan	291	1967–68
	Trey Townsend	291	2023–24

Single game
Rk	Player	Rebounds	Season	Opponent
1	Tom Allan	27	1967–68	Grand Valley State
2	Mike McCan	26	1997–98	Aquinas
	Perry James	26	1976–77	Ferris State
	Kevin Williams	26	1975–76	Hillsdale
5	Kevin Williams	25	1975–76	Northwood
	Carvin Melson	25	1971–72	Bethany
	Tom Allan	25	1967–68	Detroit Tech
	Tom Allan	25	1967–68	Spring Arbor
	Tom Allan	25	1968–69	Albion

== Assists ==
Career
Rk	Player	Assists	Seasons
1	Brian Gregory	905	1987–88 1988–89 1989–90
2	Johnathon Jones	819	2006–07 2007–08 2008–09 2009–10
3	Kay Felder	788	2013–14 2014–15 2015–16
4	Jalen Moore	643	2020–21 2021–22 2022–23
5	Mychal Covington	514	1998–99 1999–00 2000–01 2001–02
6	Kevin Kovach	507	1993–94 1994–95 1995–96 1996–97
7	Ty McGregor	386	1990–91 1991–92 1992–93 1993–94
8	Rob Skinner	374	1982–83 1983–84 1984–85 1985–86
9	Reggie Hamilton	372^{[a]}	2010–11 2011–12
10	Eric Taylor	321	1988–89 1989–90 1990–91 1991–92

Season
Rk	Player	Assists	Season
1	Brian Gregory	374	1987–88
2	Kay Felder	324^{[f]}	2015–16
3	Brian Gregory	300	1988–89
4	Johnathon Jones	290	2008–09
5	Kay Felder^{[e]}	252	2014–15
	Jalen Moore	252	2020–21
7	Brian Gregory	231	1989–90
8	Jalen Moore	228	2021–22
9	Johnathon Jones	224	2009–10
10	Brody Robinson	215	2025–26

Single game
Rk	Player	Assists	Season	Opponent
1	Brian Gregory	25	1987–88	Northern Michigan
2	Brian Gregory	23	1987–88	Northern Michigan
	Brian Gregory	23	1987–88	Aquinas
4	Brian Gregory	20	1988–89	Saginaw Valley State

== Steals ==
Career
Rk	Player	Steals	Seasons
1	Eric Taylor	233	1988–89 1989–90 1990–91 1991–92
2	Rawle Marshall	198^{[b]}	2002–03 2003–04 2004–05
	Johnathon Jones	198	2006–07 2007–08 2008–09 2009–10
4	Duke Mondy	190	2012–13 2013–14
5	Jalen Moore	176	2020–21 2021–22 2022–23
6	Trey Townsend	166	2020–21 2021–22 2022–23 2023–24
7	Kay Felder	164	2013–14 2014–15 2015–16
8	Mike Helms	163	2000–01 2001–02 2002–03 2003–04
9	Brian Gregory	161	1987–88 1988–89 1989–90
10	Brad Buddenborg	158	1998–99 1999–00 2000–01 2001–02

Season
Rk	Player	Steals	Season
1	Duke Mondy	100	2012–13
2	Duke Mondy	90	2013–14
3	Rawle Marshall	80	2002–03
4	Eric Taylor	73	1991–92
5	Reggie Hamilton	72	2011–12
	Antoine Williams	72	1981–82
7	Jalen Moore	66	2022–23
8	Kay Felder	65	2015–16
	Johnathon Jones	65	2009–10
	Eric Taylor	65	1988–89

Single game
Rk	Player	Steals	Season	Opponent
1	Rawle Marshall	10	2002–03	Texas A&M
2	Eric Taylor	9	1989–90	Huntington
	Eric Taylor	9	1977–78	Tri-State
4	Kay Felder	8	2015–16	Chicago State
	Drew Valentine	8	2012–13	UMKC
6	Jalen Moore	7	2020–21	Bradley
	Duke Mondy	7	2013–14	Indiana
	Duke Mondy	7	2012–13	Michigan State
	Kevin Kovach	7	1995–96	Rochester College
	Eric Taylor	7	1991–92	Hillsdale
	Eric Taylor	7	1991–92	St. Mary's (MI)
	Eric Taylor	7	1981–82	Grand Valley State
	Eric Taylor	7	1981–82	Shaw
	Eric Taylor	7	1980–81	Northern Michigan
	Eric Taylor	7	1976–77	Milwaukee

== Blocks ==
Career
Rk	Player	Blocks	Seasons
1	Keith Benson	371	2007–08 2008–09 2009–10 2010–11
2	Isaiah Brock	158	2016–17 2017–18
3	Brad Brechting	115	2015–16 2016–17 2018–19 2019–20
4	Xavier Hill-Mais	111	2015–16 2016–17 2018–19 2019–20
5	Rawle Marshall	101	2002–03 2003–04 2004–05
6	Trey Townsend	100	2020–21 2021–22 2022–23 2023–24
7	Will Hudson	88	2007–08 2008–09 2009–10 2010–11
8	Lee Fitzpatrick	79	1988–89 1989–90 1990–91 1991–92
9	Tuburu Naivalurua	78	2023–24 2024–25 2025–26
10	Chris Howze	61	1982–83 1983–84 1984–85 1985–86

Season
Rk	Player	Blocks	Season
1	Keith Benson	127	2010–11
2	Keith Benson	117	2009–10
3	Keith Benson	87	2008–09
4	Isaiah Brock	86	2017–18
5	Isaiah Brock	67	2016–17
6	Allen Mukeba	46	2024–25
7	Xavier Hill-Mais	45	2019–20
8	Dennis Kann	41	1992–93
	Rawle Marshall	41	2002–03
10	Keith Benson	40	2007–08
	Rawle Marshall	40	2004–05
	Lee Fitzpatrick	40	1991–92

Single game
Rk	Player	Blocks	Season	Opponent
1	Keith Benson	8	2009–10	Eastern Michigan
	Keith Benson	8	2008–09	South Dakota State
3	Isaiah Brock	7	2016–17	Robert Morris
	Keith Benson	7	2010–11	Centenary (1/29/11)
	Keith Benson	7	2010–11	Centenary
	Keith Benson	7	2009–10	Central Arkansas
	Shane Lawal	7	2007–08	Duquesne
8	Allen Mukeba	6	2024–25	Green Bay
	Isaiah Brock	6	2017–18	IUPUI
	Isaiah Brock	6	2017–18	Northern Kentucky
	Isaiah Brock	6	2017–18	Green Bay
	Isaiah Brock	6	2017–18	Milwaukee
	Keith Benson	6	2009–10	IUPUI
	Keith Benson	6	2009–10	IPFW
	Keith Benson	6	2008–09	IPFW
	Keith Benson	6	2008–09	IPFW
	Dan Buza	6	1993–94	Madonna
	Don Rawlings	6	1979–80	Shaw
	Keith Benson	6	2010–11	Wright State
	Keith Benson	6	2010–11	Austin Peay
	Keith Benson	6	2010–11	IPFW

== Field goal percentage ==
Career (3 made per game and 2 years)
Rk	Player	Field goal pct	Seasons
1	Dan Champagne	62.4% (698–1118)	1997–98 1998–99 1999–00 2000-01 2001–02
2	Jason Burkholder	59.4% (508–855)	1992–93 1993–94 1994–95 1995–96
3	Dan Buza	59.3% (304–513)	1993–94 1994–95 1995–96 1996–97
4	Matt McClellan	57.9% (294–508)	1995–96 1996–97
5	Corey Petros	57.6% (664–1152)	2011–12 2012–13 2013–14 2014–15

Season (3 made per game)
Rk	Player	Field goal pct	Season
1	Dan Champagne	66.6% (191–287)	1997–98
2	Dan Buza	66.3% (116–175)	1995–96
3	Jason Burkholder	66.2% (176–266)	1994–95
4	Dan Champagne	65.0% (139–214)	2000–01
5	Will Hudson	64.5% (160–248)	2010–11

Game (10 made)
Rk	Player	Field goal pct	Season	Opponent
1	Xavier Hill-Mais	100% (12–12)	2018–19	Defiance
2	Jason Burkholder	100% (11–11)	1993–94	Mercyhurst
3	Brad Brechting	93.3% (14–15)^{[h]}	2018–19	Cleveland State
4	Tim Kramer	92.9% (13–14)	1977–78	IUPUI
5	Dan Champagne	91.7% (11–12)	2001–02	Chicago State
	Phil Johnson	91.7% (11–12)	1991–92	Michigan Tech
	Mike Mohn	91.7% (11–12)	1983–84	Saginaw Valley State

== Free throw percentage ==
Career (2 made per game and 2 years)
Rk	Player	Free throw pct	Seasons
1	Travis Bader	87.9% (441–502)	2010–11 2011–12 2012–13 2013–14
2	Larry Wright	86.9% (152–175)	2009–10 2010–11
3	Reggie Hamilton	86.4% (382–442)	2010–11 2011–12
4	Tom Marrowelli	85.9% (165–192)	1994–95 1995–96
5	Jason Rozycki	84.2% (410–487)	1998–99 1999–00 2000–01 2001–02
6	John Henderson	83.4% (383–459)	1986–87 1987–88 1988–89
7	Rashad Williams	82.8% (96-116)	2019–20 2020–21
8	Kay Felder	82.2% (514–625)	2013–14 2014–15 2015–16
9	Johnathon Jones	81.7% (394–482)	2006–07 2007–08 2008–09 2009–10
10	Brian Gregory	81.6% (360–441)	1987–88 1988–89 1989–90

Season (2 made per game)
Rk	Player	Free throw pct	Season
1	Travis Bader	94.3% (164–174)	2013–14
2	Larry Wright	92.6% (87–94)	2009–10
3	Brad Buddenborg	89.2% (107–120)	1999–00
4	Travis Bader	88.6% (179–202)	2012–13
5	Erik Kangas	88.3% (83–94)	2008–09
6	Reggie Hamilton	87.6% (262–299)	2011–12
7	Mike Clancy	87.5% (49–56)	1969–70
8	Tom Marowelli	87.2% (82–94)	1994–95
9	Jason Rozycki	86.8% (138–159)	2000–01
10	Jason Rozycki	86.3% (88–102)	1998–99

Single game
Rk	Player	Free throw pct	Season	Opponent
1	Travis Bader	100% (18–18)	2013–14	Youngstown State
2	Tom Eller	100% (17–17)	1991–92	Edinboro
3	Isaac Garrett	100% (16–16)	2025–26	Robert Morris
4	Jaevin Cumberland	100% (15–15)	2018–19	Oral Roberts
	Reggie Hamilton	100% (15–15)	2011–12	Tennessee
6	Reggie Hamilton	100% (14–14)	2011–12	Rice
	Jamal Cain	100% (14–14)	2021–22	Green Bay
	Jalen Moore	100% (14–14)	2022–23	Northern Kentucky
9	Kay Felder	100% (13–13)	2015–16	Toledo
	Reggie Hamilton	100% (13–13)	2011–12	Southern Utah
	Scott Bittinger	100% (13–13)	1987–88	Siena Heights

== Three point field goal percentage ==
Career (1.5 made per game and 2 years)
Rk	Player	3-pt field goal pct	Seasons
1	Max Hooper^{[d]}	42.6% (177–416)	2014–15 2015–16
2	Kris Matuszewski	41.6% (102–245)	1995–96 1996–97
3	Mike Riley	40.6% (89–219)	1996–97 1997–98
4	Travis Bader	40.5% (504–1246)	2010–11 2011–12 2012–13 2013–14
5	Eric Kangas	40.4% (348–861)	2005–06 2006–07 2007–08 2008–09
6	Eric Taylor	40.2% (208–517)	1988–89 1989–90 1990–91 1991–92
7	Matt Stuck	40.0% (237–592)	1992–93 1993–94 1994–95 1995–96
8	Kevin Kovach	39.34% (249–633)	1993–94 1994–95 1995–96 1996–97
9	Tom Marowelli	39.31% (125–318)	1994–95 1995–96
10	Brad Buddenborg	39.1% (286–731)	1998–99 1999–00 2000–01 2001–02

Season (1.5 made per game)
Rk	Player	3-pt field goal pct	Season
1	Kris Matuszewski	50.5% (46–91)	1995–96
2	Braden Norris	48.6% (67–138)	2018–19
3	John Henderson	47.5% (48–101)	1988–89
4	Max Hooper	45.5% (117–257)^{[g]}	2015–16
5	Eric Taylor	44.4% (55–124)	1989–90
6	Travis Bader	44.3% (94–212)	2010–11
7	Mike Riley	43.6% (51–117)	1996–97
8	Matt Stuck	43.3% (90–208)	1993–94
9	Brad Buddenborg	43.2% (73–169)	2000–01
10	Erik Kangas	43.1% (109–253)	2006–07

Single game (5 made)
Rk	Player	Free throw pct	Season	Opponent
1	Zion Young	100% (9–9)	2020–21	Detroit Mercy
2	Myke Thom	100% (7–7)	1998–99	Toledo
3	Kay Felder	100% (6–6)	2015–16	Abilene Christian
	Tony Howard	100% (6–6)	1988–89	Lake Erie
5	Braden Norris	100% (5–5)	2018–19	Northern Illinois
	Larry Wright	100% (5–5)	2009–10	Western Illinois
	Ty McGregor	100% (5–5)	1991–92	Wayne State
	Scott Bittinger	100% (5–5)	1986–87	Lake Superior State
9	Reggie Hamilton	87.5% (7–8)	2010–11	IUPUI
	Jason Rozycki	87.5% (7–8)	1999–00	Oral Roberts
	Tom Marowelli	87.5% (7–8)	1994–95	Northern Michigan

== Three point field goals ==
Career
Rk	Player	3-pt field goals	Seasons
1	Travis Bader	504	2010–14
2	Erik Kangas	348	2005-09
3	Jason Rozycki	292	1998-02
4	Brad Buddenborg	286	1998-02
5	Blake Lampman	279	2019-24
6	Kevin Kovach	249	1993-97
7	Matt Stuck	237	1992-96
8	Mike Helms	212	2000-04
9	Eric Taylor	208	1988-92
10	Reggie Hamilton	200	2010-12

Season
Rk	Player	3-pt field goals	Season
1	Travis Bader	147	2013–14
2	Travis Bader	139	2012–13
3	Jack Gohlke	137	2023-24
4	Erik Kangas	135	2008-09
5	Kendrick Nunn	134	2017-18
6	Travis Bader	124	2011-12
7	Reggie Hamilton	118	2011-12
8	Jaevin Cumberland	109	2018-19
	Erik Kangas	109	2006-07
10	Max Hooper	105	2015-16

Single game
Rk	Player	3-pt field goals	Season	Opponent
1	Travis Bader	11	2012–13	IUPUI
2	Rashad Williams	10	2020–21	Oklahoma State
	Travis Bader	10	2013–14	Cleveland State
	Travis Bader	10	2013–14	Eastern Michigan
	Travis Bader	10	2011–12	South Dakota State
	Jack Gohlke	10	2023–24	IUPUI
	Jack Gohlke	10	2023–24	Kentucky
	Brody Robinson	10	2025–26	Northern Kentucky
9	Zion Young	9	2020–21	Detroit Mercy
	Max Hooper	9	2015–16	Green Bay
	Travis Bader	9	2012–13	South Dakota State
	Reggie Hamilton	9	22011–12	Western Illinois
	Calvin Wooten	9	2005–06	Albany
	Jason Rozycki	9	1999–00	Western Illinois
	Kevin Kovach	9	1996–97	Hillsdale

== Games played ==
Career
Rk	Player	Games played	Seasons
1	Blake Lampman	143	2019–20 2020–21 2021–22 2022–23 2023–24
2	Travis Bader	137	2010–11 2011–12 2012–13 2013–14
	Will Hudson	137	2007–08 2008–09 2009–10 2010–11
4	Drew Valentine	136	2009–10 2010–11 2011–12 2012–13
5	Keith Benson	135	2007–08 2008–09 2009–10 2010–11
	Johnathon Jones	135	2006–07 2007–08 2008–09 2009–10
	Corey Petros	135	2011–12 2012–13 2013–14 2014–15
8	Jalen Hayes	132	2013–14 2014–15 2015–16 2016–17 2017–18
	Xavier Hill-Mais	132	2015–16 2016–17 2017–18 2018–19 2019–20
10	Derick Nelson	130	2005–06 2006–07 2007–08 2009–10
	Brad Brechting	130	2015–16 2016–17 2017–18 2018–19 2019–20

Season
Rk	Player	Games	Season
1	Keith Benson	36	2008–09
	Blake Cushingberry	36	2008–09
	Johnathon Jones	36	2008–09
	Will Hudson	36	2008–09
	Drew Maynard	36	2008–09
	Dan Waterstradt	36	2008–09
	Travis Bader	36	2011–12
	Reggie Hamilton	36	2011–12
	Laval Lucas-Perry	36	2011–12
	Corey Petros	36	2011–12
	Drew Valentine	36	2011–12
	DQ Cole	36	2023–24
	Jack Gohlke	36	2023–24
	Trey Townsend	36	2023–24

== Footnotes ==
^{a} The official Oakland record book lists Reggie Hamilton in third place with 548 career assists from 2010–2012. That includes the assists he accumulated while at UMKC from 2007–2009, which is inconsistent with how the rest of the record book handles transfer player statistics.
^{b} The official Oakland record book lists Marshall's total at 199, but the addition of his individual season's statistics makes the total 198 (80 in 2002–03, 59 in 2003–04, 59 in 2004–05).
^{c} The official Oakland record book lists Felder's 2015–16 point total as 773 while multiple independent sources list the number as 853.
^{d} The official Oakland record book does not list Max Hooper, even though he meets all the requirements to be included on the list.
^{e} The official Oakland record book does not list Felder's 2014–15 season.
^{f} The official Oakland record book lists Felder's 2015–16 assist total as 296.
^{g} The official Oakland record book lists Hooper's 2015–16 three point field goal percentage as 44.9% (105–234).
^{h} The official Oakland record book lists Brechting's single game field goals as 13–14, but has the correct percentage.
