= 2010–11 Summit League men's basketball season =

2009–10 The Summit League men's basketball season
- League: NCAA Division I
- Sport: Basketball
- Teams: 10
- Regular season champion: Oakland
- Season MVP: Keith Benson (Oakland)
- Finals champions: Oakland

Basketball seasons
- ← 09–10 11–12 →

2010–11 Summit League men's basketball standings
	Conf.				Overall
Team	W		L	PCT	W		L	PCT
Oakland †	17	–	1	.944	25	–	10	.714
Oral Roberts	13	–	5	.722	19	–	16	.543
IUPUI	12	–	6	.667	19	–	14	.576
IPFW	11	–	7	.611	18	–	12	.600
South Dakota State	10	–	8	.556	19	–	12	.613
UMKC	9	–	9	.500	16	–	14	.533
North Dakota State	8	–	10	.444	14	–	15	.483
Southern Utah	7	–	11	.389	11	–	19	.367
Western Illinois	2	–	16	.111	7	–	23	.233
Centenary *	1	–	17	.056	1	–	29	.033
† Conference tournament winner As of March 18, 2011; Rankings from AP Poll * Ineligible for conference tournament

The 2010–11 The Summit League men's basketball season is the 29th college basketball season in the conference's existence. The conference features ten teams that are competing for The Summit League regular season and tournament titles.

== Awards and honors ==
=== The Summit League All-Conference teams ===
Award	Recipients
First Team	Keith Benson (Oakland); Reggie Hamilton (Oakland); Leroy Nobles (IUPUI); Dominique Morrison (Oral Roberts); Nate Wolters (South Dakota State); Alex Young (IUPUI)
Second Team	Ben Botts (IPFW); Jay Couisnard (UMKC); Will Hudson (Oakland); Clint Sargent (South Dakota State); Michael Tveidt (North Dakota State)
Honorable Mention	Damen Bell-Holter (Oral Roberts); Frank Gaines (IPFW); Spencer Johnson (UMKC); Matt Lander (Western Illinois); Warren Niles (Oral Roberts)
All-Newcomer Team	Travis Bader (Oakland); Reggie Chamberlain (UMKC); Jordan Dykstra (South Dakota State); Steven Roundtree (Oral Roberts); Stephen Thomas (IUPUI)
Player of the Year	Keith Benson (Oakland)
Newcomer of the Year	Steven Roundtree (Oral Roberts)
Sixth Man of the Year	Larry Wright (Oakland)
Defensive Player of the Year	Keith Benson (Oakland)
Coach of the Year	Greg Kampe (Oakland)
