= Jalen Moore (basketball, born 1999) =

American basketball player

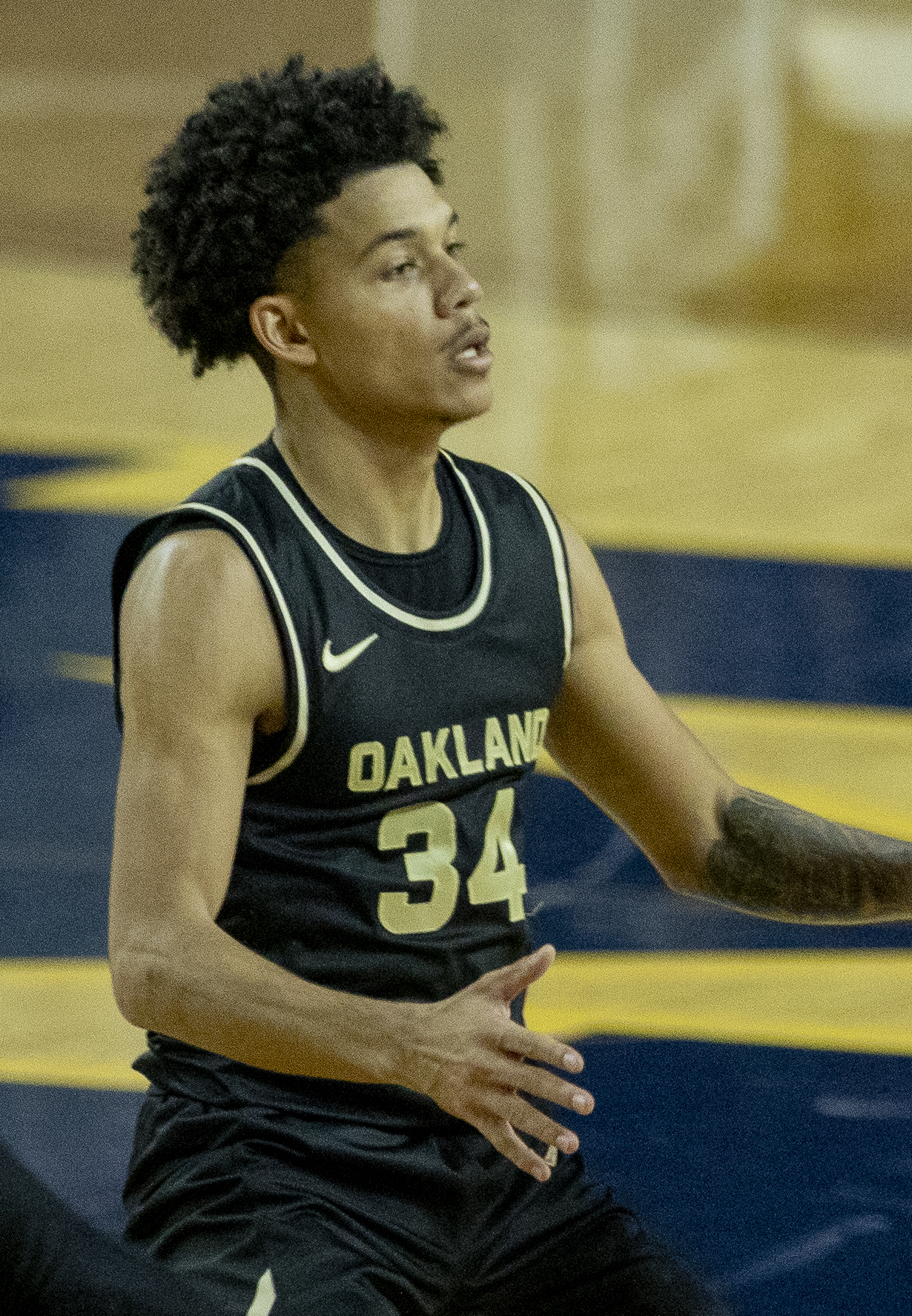
- Moore with Oakland in 2020

Free agent
- Position: Point guard

Personal information
- Born: August 7, 1999 (age 27)
- Listed height: 5 ft 11 in (1.80 m)
- Listed weight: 170 lb (77 kg)

Career information
- High school: Cloverdale (Cloverdale, Indiana)
- College: Olney Central (2018–2020); Oakland (2020–2023)
- NBA draft: 2023: undrafted
- Playing career: 2023–present

Career history
- 2023: Haukar
- 2023: Hamar
- 2024–2025: Prishtina
- 2025–2026: BC Körmend

Career highlights
- NCAA assists leader (2021); 2× First-team All-Horizon League (2021, 2023); Second-team All-Horizon League (2022); Third-team NJCAA DI All-American (2020); All-GRAC Team (2020)

Jalen Moore (born August 7, 1999) is an American professional basketball player who is a free agent. He played college basketball for Olney Central College and Oakland University.

== High school career ==
Moore attended Cloverdale High School in Cloverdale, Indiana. As a senior, he averaged 36.8 points per game and scored 1,033 points, the third-most in a single season in state history. His 2,440 career points ranked 11th in state history.

== College career ==
Moore began playing college basketball at Olney Central College. He averaged 19.3 points and 7.8 assists per game as a freshman. In his sophomore season, he averaged 22.6 points, 6.2 assists and five rebounds per game. He was a Third Team National Junior College Athletic Association Division I All-American and an All-Great Rivers Athletic Conference selection.

For his junior season, Moore moved to the NCAA Division I, transferring to Oakland. He was drawn there in part due the success Kay Felder, another undersized point guard, had with the program. On January 8, 2021, Moore scored 33 points in an 84–81 loss to Green Bay in overtime. On January 16, he posted 31 points and 12 assists in an 81–74 win over Youngstown State. Six days later, Moore recorded 18 points, 14 assists and 11 rebounds in an 86–81 victory over Detroit Mercy, the first triple-double by an Oakland player since Felder in 2016. He averaged 17.9 points, a Division I-leading 8.4 assists and 4.1 rebounds per game. Moore was named to the First Team All-Horizon League. He was named to the Second Team All-Horizon League as a senior.

== Professional career ==
In July 2023, Moore signed with Haukar of the Úrvalsdeild karla. On 14 November, he was released by the club. In six games, he averaged a league leading 27.3 points along with 9.1 rebounds and 8.2 assists. Two days later, he signed with Úrvalsdeild club Hamar. He appeared in 4 league games for Hamar, averaging 28.0 points, 7.8 rebounds and 5.5 assists before leaving the team at the christmas break. In 2025, Moore joined BC Körmend of the Hungarian league. He averaged 19.7 points, 3.7 rebounds, 6.4 assists and 1.7 steals per game. Moore left the team on April 29, 2026.

== Career statistics ==
Legend
GP	Games played	GS	Games started	MPG	Minutes per game
FG%	Field goal percentage	3P%	3-point field goal percentage	FT%	Free throw percentage
RPG	Rebounds per game	APG	Assists per game	SPG	Steals per game
BPG	Blocks per game	PPG	Points per game	**Bold**	Career high

*	Led NCAA Division I

=== College ===
==== NCAA Division I ====
Year	Team	GP	GS	MPG	FG%	3P%	FT%	RPG	APG	SPG	BPG	PPG
2020–21	Oakland	30	29	37.8	.383	.349	.776	4.1	8.4*	1.7	.1	17.9

== Personal life ==
Moore's father, William, played college basketball for Daytona State College and Murray State before embarking on a professional career.
