= 2011 Summit League men's basketball tournament =

- Classification: Division I
- Season: 2010–11
- Teams: 8
- Site: Sioux Falls Arena; Sioux Falls, South Dakota
- Champions: Oakland (3rd title)
- Winning coach: Greg Kampe (3rd title)
- MVP: Keith Benson (Oakland)
- Top scorer: Reggie Hamilton (Oakland) (69 points)
- Television: ESPN2, Midco Sports Net

2010–11 Summit League men's basketball standings
	Conf.				Overall
Team	W		L	PCT	W		L	PCT
Oakland †	17	–	1	.944	25	–	10	.714
Oral Roberts	13	–	5	.722	19	–	16	.543
IUPUI	12	–	6	.667	19	–	14	.576
IPFW	11	–	7	.611	18	–	12	.600
South Dakota State	10	–	8	.556	19	–	12	.613
UMKC	9	–	9	.500	16	–	14	.533
North Dakota State	8	–	10	.444	14	–	15	.483
Southern Utah	7	–	11	.389	11	–	19	.367
Western Illinois	2	–	16	.111	7	–	23	.233
Centenary *	1	–	17	.056	1	–	29	.033
† Conference tournament winner As of March 18, 2011; Rankings from AP Poll * Ineligible for conference tournament

The 2011 Summit League men's basketball tournament was the 2011 post-season tournament for Summit League, an NCAA Division I athletic conference. It was won by regular season champion Oakland University. It took place March 5–8, 2011 at the Sioux Falls Arena in Sioux Falls, South Dakota.

== Format ==
Out of the league's 10 teams, the top eight received berths in the conference tournament. After the 18-game conference season, teams were seeded by conference record, with tiebreakers used if necessary in the following order:

1. Head-to-head competition
2. Winning percentage vs. ranked conference teams (starting with #1 and moving down until the tie is broken)
3. Ratings Percentage Index
4. Coin flip

== Bracket ==
All Times Central

Quarterfinals; March 5–6
1	Oakland	82
8	Southern Utah	66
4	IPFW	75
5	South Dakota State	85
2	Oral Roberts	72
7	North Dakota State	65
3	IUPUI	79
6	UMKC	55

Semifinals; March 7
1	Oakland	110
5	South Dakota State	90
2	Oral Roberts	83
3	IUPUI	77

Final; March 8
1	Oakland	90
2	Oral Roberts	76
