= 2010–11 Oral Roberts Golden Eagles men's basketball team =

American college basketball season

2010–11 Oral Roberts Golden Eagles men's basketball

CIT, First Round
- Conference: Summit League
- Record: 19–16 (13–5 Summit)
- Head coach: Scott Sutton (12th season)
- Assistant coaches: Chris Crutchfield (4th season); Tom Hankins (14th season); Conley Phipps (12th season)
- Home arena: Mabee Center

2010–11 Summit League men's basketball standings
	Conf.				Overall
Team	W		L	PCT	W		L	PCT
Oakland †	17	–	1	.944	25	–	10	.714
Oral Roberts	13	–	5	.722	19	–	16	.543
IUPUI	12	–	6	.667	19	–	14	.576
IPFW	11	–	7	.611	18	–	12	.600
South Dakota State	10	–	8	.556	19	–	12	.613
UMKC	9	–	9	.500	16	–	14	.533
North Dakota State	8	–	10	.444	14	–	15	.483
Southern Utah	7	–	11	.389	11	–	19	.367
Western Illinois	2	–	16	.111	7	–	23	.233
Centenary *	1	–	17	.056	1	–	29	.033
† Conference tournament winner As of March 18, 2011; Rankings from AP Poll * Ineligible for conference tournament

The 2010–11 Oral Roberts Golden Eagles men's basketball team represented Oral Roberts University in the 2010–11 NCAA Division I men's basketball season. The Golden Eagles, led by head coach Scott Sutton, played their home games at the Mabee Center in Tulsa, Oklahoma, as members of The Summit League. The Golden Eagles finished 2nd in the Summit League during the regular season, and won two games in the Summit League tournament before losing in the championship game to regular-season Oakland.

Oral Roberts failed to qualify for the NCAA tournament, but were invited to the 2011 CIT. The Golden Eagles were eliminated in the first round of the CIT, losing to SMU, 64–57.

== Roster ==
2010–11 Oral Roberts Golden Eagles men's basketball team
Players
Coaches

Pos.	#	Name	Height	Weight	Year	Hometown
G	3	Robert Aery	6 ft 0 in (1.83 m)	185 lb (84 kg)	Fr	Tulsa, Oklahoma
G	4	Roderick Pearson	6 ft 2 in (1.88 m)	195 lb (88 kg)	Sr	Kansas City, Missouri
F/C	5	Tim Morton	6 ft 9 in (2.06 m)	240 lb (109 kg)	So	Greenbelt, Maryland
G	12	Ken Holdman	6 ft 0 in (1.83 m)	180 lb (82 kg)	Jr	Tulsa, Oklahoma
G	13	Warren Niles	6 ft 4 in (1.93 m)	175 lb (79 kg)	So	Cincinnati, Ohio
G/F	14	Jake Lliteras	6 ft 5 in (1.96 m)	195 lb (88 kg)	Fr	Hillsborough, North Carolina
G	20	Alex Desir	6 ft 1 in (1.85 m)	175 lb (79 kg)	Sr	Lake Worth, Florida
F	22	Steven Roundtree	6 ft 8 in (2.03 m)	190 lb (86 kg)	Fr	Jacksonville, Florida
G/F	25	Kyron Stokes	6 ft 5 in (1.96 m)	215 lb (98 kg)	Jr	Mansfield, Texas
F	30	Chris Angsomwine	6 ft 9 in (2.06 m)	215 lb (98 kg)	Jr	Accra, Ghana
F/C	32	Damen Bell-Holter	6 ft 9 in (2.06 m)	245 lb (111 kg)	So	Hydaburg, Alaska
F	34	Dione Young	6 ft 5 in (1.96 m)	215 lb (98 kg)	Sr	Kenosha, Wisconsin
G	35	Mikey Manghum	6 ft 2 in (1.88 m)	185 lb (84 kg)	So	Derby, England
F/C	42	Javier Nasarre	6 ft 10 in (2.08 m)	225 lb (102 kg)	Sr	Barbastro, Spain
G	44	Hunter McClintock	6 ft 2 in (1.88 m)	175 lb (79 kg)	RS Fr	Durham, North Carolina
F	45	Dominique Morrison	6 ft 6 in (1.98 m)	210 lb (95 kg)	Jr	Kansas City, Missouri
F	54	Michael Craion	6 ft 5 in (1.96 m)	215 lb (98 kg)	Sr	Kansas City, Missouri

Head coach

- Scott Sutton (Oklahoma State)

Assistant coach(es)

- Chris Crutchfield (Omaha)
- Tom Hankins (Northeastern State)
- Conley Phipps (Northeastern State)

Legend

- (C) Team captain
- (S) Suspended
- (I) Ineligible
- (W) Walk-on
- Injured
- Current redshirt

Roster
Last update: January 22, 2023

== Schedule and results ==
Date time, TV	Rank^{#}	Opponent^{#}	Result	Record	Site (attendance) city, state
Exhibition
November 2, 2010*; 7:05 pm		Drury	W 79–76	—	Mabee Center; Tulsa, OK
November 6, 2010*; 7:05 pm		Rogers State	W 77–63	—	Mabee Center; Tulsa, OK
Regular season
November 12, 2010*; 8:35 pm		at Missouri State	L 61–78	0–1	JQH Arena (7,010); Springfield, MO
November 16, 2010*; 11:00 am, ESPN2		at Tulsa; Rivalry	L 68–83	0–2	Reynolds Center (7,057); Tulsa, OK
November 20, 2010*; 7:05 pm, FCS		Indiana State	L 69–74	0–3	Mabee Center (2,893); Tulsa, OK
November 24, 2010*; 7:05 pm, FCS		Arkansas–Little Rock	W 86–60	1–3	Mabee Center (3,402); Tulsa, OK
November 27, 2010*; 8:00 pm		at Utah	W 78–70	2–3	Jon M. Huntsman Center (7,387); Salt Lake City, UT
November 30, 2010*; 7:00 pm		at Texas Tech	L 82–86	2–4	United Spirit Arena (8,196); Lubbock, TX
December 2, 2010; 8:00 pm		at Western Illinois	W 71–58	3–4 (1–0)	Western Hall (1,398); Macomb, IL
December 4, 2010; 6:00 pm		at IUPUI	W 63–61	4–4 (2–0)	IUPUI Gymnasium (1,215); Indianapolis, IN
December 11, 2010*; 2:00 pm		at Oklahoma	L 60–73	4–5	Lloyd Noble Center (8,511); Norman, OK
December 16, 2010*; 7:30 pm		at No. 13 Missouri	L 62–81	4–6	Mabee Center (8,130); Tulsa, OK
December 21, 2010*; 4:15 pm		vs. Miami (FL); Las Vegas Holiday Hoops Classic	L 56–69	4–7	South Point Arena; Enterprise, NV
December 22, 2010*; 6:30 pm		vs. Arkansas–Little Rock; Las Vegas Holiday Hoops Classic	L 49–52	4–8	South Point Arena; Enterprise, NV
December 23, 2010*; 4:15 pm		vs. Rice; Las Vegas Holiday Hoops Classic	W 80–78	5–8	South Point Arena; Enterprise, NV
December 28, 2010; 7:05 pm, FCS		IPFW	L 73–76	5–9 (2–1)	Mabee Center (2,628); Tulsa, OK
December 30, 2010; 7:05 pm, FCS		Oakland	L 77–85	5–10 (2–2)	Mabee Center (3,035); Tulsa, OK
January 3, 2011*; 6:00 pm		at Akron	L 80–84	5–11	James A. Rhodes Arena (1,920); Akron, OH
January 6, 2011; 7:00 pm		at North Dakota State	L 74–80	5–12 (2–3)	Bison Sports Arena (2,774); Fargo, ND
January 8, 2011; 7:30 pm		at South Dakota State	W 90–82	6–12 (3–3)	Frost Arena (2,637); Brookings, SD
January 13, 2011; 7:05 pm, FCS		Southern Utah	W 87–71	7–12 (4–3)	Mabee Center (2,799); Tulsa, OK
January 15, 2011; 7:05 pm, KGEB		UMKC	W 69–63	8–12 (5–3)	Mabee Center (3,203); Tulsa, OK
January 22, 2011; 7:05 pm, FCS		Centenary	W 78–65	9–12 (6–3)	Mabee Center (3,466); Tulsa, OK
January 27, 2011; 6:00 pm		at Oakland	L 85–88	9–13 (6–4)	Athletics Center O'rena (2,615); Rochester, MI
January 29, 2011; 6:00 pm		at IPFW	L 77–80	9–14 (6–5)	Allen County War Memorial Coliseum (1,653); Fort Wayne, IN
February 3, 2011; 7:05 pm, FCS		South Dakota State	W 77–73	10–14 (7–5)	Mabee Center (3,419); Tulsa, OK
February 5, 2011; 7:05 pm, FCS		North Dakota State	W 81–73	11–14 (8–5)	Mabee Center (4,125); Tulsa, OK
February 10, 2011; 7:05 pm		at UMKC	W 102–81	12–14 (9–5)	Swinney Recreation Center (1,664); Kansas City, MO
February 12, 2011; 7:30 pm		at Southern Utah	W 71–69	13–14 (10–5)	America First Event Center (2,447); Cedar City, UT
February 15, 2011; 7:00 pm		at Centenary	W 81–61	14–14 (11–5)	Gold Dome (391); Shreveport, LA
February 19, 2011*; 8:05 pm		Pacific	W 79–63	15–14	Mabee Center (4,237); Tulsa, OK
February 24, 2011; 7:05 pm, FCS		IUPUI	W 92–74	16–14 (12–5)	Mabee Center (3,495); Tulsa, OK
February 26, 2011; 7:05 pm		Western Illinois	W 69–57	17–14 (13–5)	Mabee Center (3,714); Tulsa, OK
Summit League tournament
March 5, 2011; 8:30 pm	(2)	vs. (7) North Dakota State; Summit League Quarterfinals	W 72–65	18–14	Sioux Falls Arena (3,714); Sioux Falls, SD
March 7, 2011; 8:30 pm	(2)	vs. (3) IUPUI; Summit League Semifinals	W 83–77	19–14	Sioux Falls Arena; Sioux Falls, SD
March 8, 2011; 8:00 pm, ESPN2	(2)	vs. (1) Oakland; Summit League Championship	L 76–90	19–15	Sioux Falls Arena (2,105); Sioux Falls, SD
CollegeInsider.com tournament
March 16, 2011; 7:00 pm		at SMU; CIT First Round	L 57–64 ^{OT}	19–16	Moody Coliseum (1,090); Dallas, TX
*Non-conference game. ^{#}Rankings from AP Poll. (#) Tournament seedings in parentheses. All times are in Central Time.
