= Metro Series =

American college basketball rivalry

- Detroit Mercy Titans Oakland Golden Grizzlies
- Sport: College basketball
- First meeting: December 15, 1973; Detroit Mercy 101, Oakland 75
- Latest meeting: February 16, 2025; Oakland 93, Detroit Mercy 83
- Trophy: Michigan Sports Hall of Fame Cup

Statistics
- Total meetings: 37
- All-time series: Oakland leads 22-15
- Largest victory: Detroit Mercy, 113–45 (1976)
- Longest win streak: Detroit Mercy, 10 (1973–2000); Oakland, 10 (2017–21)
- Current win streak: Oakland, 4 (2023–present)

Locations of Detroit Mercy and Oakland

The Metro Series is an annual college basketball rivalry game between the Detroit Mercy Titans and the Oakland Golden Grizzlies. Both schools are located in the U.S. state of Michigan in the Metro Detroit area, with Detroit Mercy being in the city of Detroit proper while Oakland is located in the Detroit suburb of Rochester. They are the only two Division I institutions in the Detroit area. Both compete as members of the Horizon League.

== History ==
The first Division I meeting was in the 1997-1998 season, which was Oakland's first season competing in Division I after it had competed at the Division II level for all seasons prior. In their first matchup, Detroit Mercy defeated the transitioning team, 110-61. The two teams faced off a few more times going into the 2000s, but with Detroit Mercy in the Midwestern Collegiate Conference (now the Horizon League) and Oakland joining the Mid-Continent Conference (now the Summit League), the series quickly fizzled out.

However, this changed in 2013, when Oakland announced it would be joining Detroit Mercy in the Horizon League for the 2013-2014 athletic season and beyond. This created a natural rivalry for the Titans, and with annual matchups between the two Detroit area schools now guaranteed for the foreseeable future, the Metro Series, as it began to be known, started to take off. Oakland won the first in-conference match-up between the schools on January 11, 2014, defeating the Titans 77-69.

2015 saw the addition of a trophy sponsored by the Michigan Sports Hall of Fame. Known as the Michigan Sports Hall of Fame Cup, it is awarded to the winner of the season basketball series between the two schools. Should the schools split the series, the cup is awarded to the team with the better Rating Percentage Index (RPI) at the time of the game. The inaugural trophy was won by Oakland in 2015; they split the series 1-1 with the Titans, but the Golden Grizzlies had the higher RPI at the end of the series, and thus were awarded the trophy.

Oakland has dominated the series of late, with Detroit Mercy having only won three games against them since the Golden Grizzlies first joined the Horizon League and winning ten straight matchups from 2017 to 2021.

== Men's results ==
Detroit Mercy victories	Oakland victories

No.	Date	Location	Winner	Score
1	December 15, 1973	Detroit	Detroit Mercy	101–75
2	January 22, 1975	Detroit	Detroit Mercy	105–48
3	December 10, 1975	Detroit	Detroit Mercy	113–83
4	December 6, 1976	Detroit	Detroit Mercy	113–45
5	January 9, 1978	Detroit	Detroit Mercy	99–58
6	November 23, 1985	Detroit	Detroit Mercy	77–62
7	February 20, 1988	Detroit	Detroit Mercy	84–80
8	December 9, 1992	Detroit	Detroit Mercy	77–50
9	February 18, 1998	Detroit	Detroit Mercy	110–61
10	December 5, 2000	Detroit	Detroit Mercy	77–56
11	December 6, 2001	Rochester	Oakland	93–67
12	December 3, 2003	Detroit	Detroit Mercy	76–60
13	January 11, 2014	Detroit	Oakland	77–69
14	February 12, 2014	Rochester	Oakland	83–82^{OT}
15	January 10, 2015	Detroit	Detroit Mercy	84–75
16	February 15, 2015	Rochester	Oakland	83–78
17	January 16, 2016	Detroit	Oakland	86–82
18	February 26, 2016	Rochester	Oakland	108–97
19	January 13, 2017	Rochester	Detroit Mercy	91–88

No.	Date	Location	Winner	Score
20	February 10, 2017	Detroit	Oakland	89–80
21	January 20, 2018	Detroit	Oakland	92–86
22	February 9, 2018	Rochester	Oakland	87–78
23	January 19, 2019	Detroit	Oakland	79–73
24	February 23, 2019	Rochester	Oakland	95–75
25	December 28, 2019	Rochester	Oakland	78–69
26	January 31, 2020	Detroit	Oakland	77–64
27	December 26, 2020	Detroit	Oakland	77–75^{OT}
28	December 27, 2020	Detroit	Oakland	83–80
29	January 22, 2021	Rochester	Oakland	86–81
30	January 23, 2021	Rochester	Detroit Mercy	82–72
31	February 13, 2022	Rochester	Oakland	75–59
32	January 23, 2023	Detroit	Oakland	76–67
33	February 17, 2023	Rochester	Detroit Mercy	96–74
34	November 29, 2023	Detroit	Oakland	65–50
35	March 2, 2024	Rochester	Oakland	75–70
36	January 18, 2025	Detroit	Oakland	65–59
37	February 16, 2025	Rochester	Oakland	93–83^{OT}
Series: Oakland leads 22–15
