= 2010–11 UMKC Kangaroos men's basketball team =

American college basketball season

2010–11 UMKC Kangaroos men's basketball
- Conference: The Summit League
- Record: 16–14 (9–9 Summit)
- Head coach: Matt Brown (4th season)
- Assistant coaches: Martin Unger (4th season); Wendell Moore (3rd season); Stephen Brough (2nd season)
- Home arena: Swinney Recreation Center, Municipal Auditorium

2010–11 Summit League men's basketball standings
	Conf.				Overall
Team	W		L	PCT	W		L	PCT
Oakland †	17	–	1	.944	25	–	10	.714
Oral Roberts	13	–	5	.722	19	–	16	.543
IUPUI	12	–	6	.667	19	–	14	.576
IPFW	11	–	7	.611	18	–	12	.600
South Dakota State	10	–	8	.556	19	–	12	.613
UMKC	9	–	9	.500	16	–	14	.533
North Dakota State	8	–	10	.444	14	–	15	.483
Southern Utah	7	–	11	.389	11	–	19	.367
Western Illinois	2	–	16	.111	7	–	23	.233
Centenary *	1	–	17	.056	1	–	29	.033
† Conference tournament winner As of March 18, 2011; Rankings from AP Poll * Ineligible for conference tournament

The 2010–11 UMKC Kangaroos men's basketball team represented the University of Missouri–Kansas City during the 2010–11 NCAA Division I men's basketball season. The Kangaroos played most of their home games on-campus at Swinney Recreation Center (with one game off-campus at Municipal Auditorium), in Kansas City, Missouri as a member of The Summit League.

== Previous season ==
The Kangaroos finished the 2009–10 season with a record of 12–18 overall, 6–12 in The Summit League to finish in eighth place.

== Roster ==
2010–11 UMKC Kangaroos men's basketball team
Players
Coaches

Pos.	#	Name	Height	Weight	Year	Previous school	Hometown
F	15	Jay Couisnard	6 ft 6 in (1.98 m)	205 lb (93 kg)	RS Sr	Evansville; Jack Yates Senior HS/ Westbury Christian	Houston, TX
F	5	Spencer Johnson	6 ft 6 in (1.98 m)	215 lb (98 kg)	Sr	Laurinburg Institute/ Champaign Central HS	Champaign, IL
G	14	Bakari Lewis	6 ft 1 in (1.85 m)	175 lb (79 kg)	Sr	Nicholls State; IMG/ Shaker Heights HS	Cleveland, OH
G	10	Reggie Chamberlain	6 ft 0 in (1.83 m)	170 lb (77 kg)	RS Jr	Wichita State/ Seward County CC; Raytown Senior HS	Kansas City, MO
G	12	Dustin Dibble	6 ft 4 in (1.93 m)	195 lb (88 kg)	Jr	Petoskey HS	Petoskey, MI
G	1	Michael Gholston, Jr.	6 ft 0 in (1.83 m)	175 lb (79 kg)	Jr	State Fair CC; Raytown South HS	Raytown, MO
F/C	4	Bernard Kamwa	6 ft 8 in (2.03 m)	245 lb (111 kg)	Jr	Sequoias; Genesis One Christian/ William Howard Taft Charter HS/ Ribét	Republic of Cameroon
G	20	Trevor Mason	5 ft 10 in (1.78 m)	170 lb (77 kg)	Jr	Bishop Miege HS	Overland Park, KS
F/C	21	Fred Chatmon (redshirt)	6 ft 9 in (2.06 m)	220 lb (100 kg)	So	Garfield Heights HS	Cleveland, OH
F/C	44	Kirk Korver (redshirt)	6 ft 7 in (2.01 m)	225 lb (102 kg)	So	Pella HS	Pella, IA
F	34	Max Rockmann	6 ft 6 in (1.98 m)	210 lb (95 kg)	So	Coubertin HS	Berlin, Germany
G	0	Nate Rogers (redshirt)	6 ft 1 in (1.85 m)	185 lb (84 kg)	So	DePaul; St. Joseph HS	Maywood, IL
F	23	Trinity Hall	6 ft 7 in (2.01 m)	205 lb (93 kg)	Fr	Wyandotte HS	Kansas City, KS

Head coach

- Matt Brown (Shippensburg)

Assistant coach(es)

- Martin Unger (Western Carolina)
- Wendell Moore (Georgia Southern)
- Stephen Brough (Miami (Ohio))

Legend

- (C) Team captain
- (S) Suspended
- (I) Ineligible
- (W) Walk-on
- (5Y) Fifth-year Senior
- Injured
- Current redshirt

Roster
Last update: November 3, 2024

== Schedule and results ==
Date time, TV	Rank^{#}	Opponent^{#}	Result	Record	High points	High rebounds	High assists	Site (attendance) city, state
Exhibition Season
November 5, 2010*; 7:05 PM		Ottawa (Kansas)	W 84–42		22 – Couisnard	–	–	Swinney Recreation Center; Kansas City, MO
Regular Season
November 12, 2010*; 7:05 PM		Truman State	W 71–59	1–0	18 – Couisnard	7 – Johnson	3 – Chamberlain	Swinney Recreation Center (1,393); Kansas City, MO
November 16, 2010*; 7:00 PM		at Central Arkansas	W 73–71	2–0	23 – Couisnard	11 – Johnson	5 – Chamberlain	Farris Center (1,042); Conway, AR
November 20, 2010*; 7:05 PM, KSMO–TV		Southeast Missouri State	W 70–62	3–0	21 – Lewis	7 – Johnson	2 – Lewis, Chamberlain, Gholston Jr.	Swinney Recreation Center (1,017); Kansas City, MO
November 24, 2010*; 7:05 PM		SIU Edwardsville	W 82–64	4–0	26 – Couisnard	14 – Johnson	4 – Lewis	Swinney Recreation Center (810); Kansas City, MO
November 29, 2010*; 7:00 PM		at Wichita State	L 52–71	4–1	20 – Chamberlain	6 – Kamwa	2 – Lewis	Charles Koch Arena (10,154); Wichita, KS
December 2, 2010; 6:00 PM		at IPFW	L 72–76 ^{OT}	4–2 (0–1)	19 – Johnson	9 – Johnson	2 – Couisnard, Gholston, Jr.	Allen County; War Memorial Coliseum (1,595); Fort Wayne, IN
December 4, 2010; 5:05 PM		at Oakland	L 62–99	4–3 (0–2)	17 – Johnson	10 – Johnson	5 – Lewis	Athletics Center O'rena (2,505); Auburn Hills, MI
December 8, 2010*; 7:05 PM, KSMO–TV		Utah Valley	W 70–63	5–3	19 – Couisnard	15 – Johnson	4 – Lewis	Swinney Recreation Center (822); Kansas City, MO
December 11, 2010*; 6:05 PM		at Idaho State	L 70–63	5–4	22 – Couisnard	7 – Kamwa, Hall	3 – Lewis	Holt Arena (1,756); Pocatello, ID
December 18, 2010*; 12:05 PM		North Dakota	W 69–61	6–4	18 – Hall	9 – Johnson	4 – Lewis	Swinney Recreation Center (1,034); Kansas City, MO
December 21, 2010*; 7:05 PM		Houston Baptist	W 73–51	7–4	23 – Chamberlain	9 – Johnson	4 – Couisnard	Swinney Recreation Center (1,218); Kansas City, MO
December 23, 2010*; 7:10 PM, FSKC		at No. 11 Kansas State	L 64–80	7–5	21 – Couisnard	9 – Couisnard	3 – Lewis	Fred Bramlage Coliseum (11,565); Manhattan, KS
December 28, 2010; 7:05 PM		North Dakota State	W 75–73	8–5 (1–2)	16 – Johnson, Chamberlain	21 – Johnson	5 – Chamberlain	Swinney Recreation Center (823); Kansas City, MO
December 30, 2010; 7:05 PM		South Dakota State	L 69–74	8–6 (1–3)	19 – Johnson	9 – Johnson	3 – Chamberlain	Swinney Recreation Center (1,037); Kansas City, MO
January 5, 2011*; 7:05 PM, Jayhawk TV Network		at No. 3 Kansas	L 52–99	8–7	16 – Couisnard, Lewis	10 – Kamwa	1 – Couisnard, Lewis, Chamberlain, Hall	Allen Fieldhouse (16,300); Lawrence, KS
January 8, 2011; 7:05 PM, KSMO–TV		Southern Utah	W 82–76	9–7 (2–3)	32 – Couisnard	6 – Johnson	2 – Lewis, Chamberlain, Dibble	Municipal Auditorium (4,435); Kansas City, MO
January 13, 2011; 7:00 PM		at Centenary	W 71–67	10–7 (3–3)	17 – Couisnard	13 – Johnson	5 – Chamberlain	Gold Dome (499); Shreveport, LA
January 15, 2011; 7:05 PM, FCS		at Oral Roberts	L 63–69 ^{OT}	10–8 (3–4)	20 – Couisnard	8 – Chamberlain	2 – Couisnard	Mabee Center (3,259); Tulsa, OK
January 20, 2011; 7:05 PM, KSMO–TV		IUPUI	W 85–77 ^{2OT}	11–8 (4–4)	27 – Couisnard	12 – Couisnard	6 – Chamberlain	Swinney Recreation Center (804); Kansas City, MO
January 22, 2011; 7:05 PM, KSMO–TV		Western Illinois	W 55–46	12–8 (5–4)	16 – Johnson	18 – Johnson	2 – Cousinard, Chamberlain, Dibble	Swinney Recreation Center (1,062); Kansas City, MO
January 27, 2011; 7:00 PM		at South Dakota State	W 63–58	13–8 (6–4)	17 – Lewis	14 – Johnson	2 – Cousinard, Chamberlain, Rockmann	Frost Arena (2,222); Brookings, SD
January 29, 2011; 7:35 PM		at North Dakota State	W 88–89 ^{2OT}	13–9 (6–5)	28 – Couisnard	13 – Couisnard	5 – Chamberlain	Bison Sports Arena (3,337); Fargo, ND
February 5, 2011; 8:30 PM		at Southern Utah	W 71–68	14–9 (7–5)	22 – Couisnard, Chamberlain	12 – Johnson	4 – Couisnard, Chamberlain	Centrum Arena (2,426); Cedar City, UT
February 10, 2011; 7:05 PM, KSMO–TV		Oral Roberts	L 81–102	14–10 (7–6)	31 – Couisnard	8 – Johnson	7 – Lewis	Swinney Recreation Center (1,664); Kansas City, MO
February 12, 2011; 7:05 PM, KSMO–TV		Centenary	W 91–58	15–10 (8–6)	21 – Couisnard	14 – Johnson	8 – Lewis	Swinney Recreation Center (1,124); Kansas City, MO
February 17, 2011; 7:00 PM		at Western Illinois	W 66–61	16–10 (9–6)	31 – Couisnard	6 – Couisnard	4 – Johnson	Western Hall (794); Macomb, IL
February 19, 2011; 6:00 PM		at IUPUI	L 69–84	16–11 (9–7)	19 – Chamberlain	8 – Johnson	4 – Lewis, Hall	IUPUI Gymnasium (1,215); Indianapolis, IN
February 24, 2011; 7:05 PM, KSMO–TV		Oakland	L 90–103	16–12 (9–8)	20 – Chamberlain, Rockmann	6 – Dibble	5 – Chamberlain	Swinney Recreation Center (1,159); Kansas City, MO
February 26, 2011; 7:05 PM, KSMO–TV		IPFW	L 57–82	16–13 (9–9)	23 – Chamberlain	3 – Couisnard, Johnson, Lewis, Chamberlain, Rockmann	5 – Lewis	Swinney Recreation Center (1,504); Kansas City, MO
League Tournament
March 6, 2011*; 8:30 PM	(6)	vs. (3) IUPUI [Quarterfinal]	L 55–79	16–14	16 – Lewis	7 – Johnson	4 – Couisnard	Sioux Falls Arena; Sioux Falls, SD
*Non-conference game. ^{#}Rankings from AP Poll. (#) Tournament seedings in parentheses. All times are in Central Standard Time (CST).
