= Travis Bader =

American basketball player (born 1991)

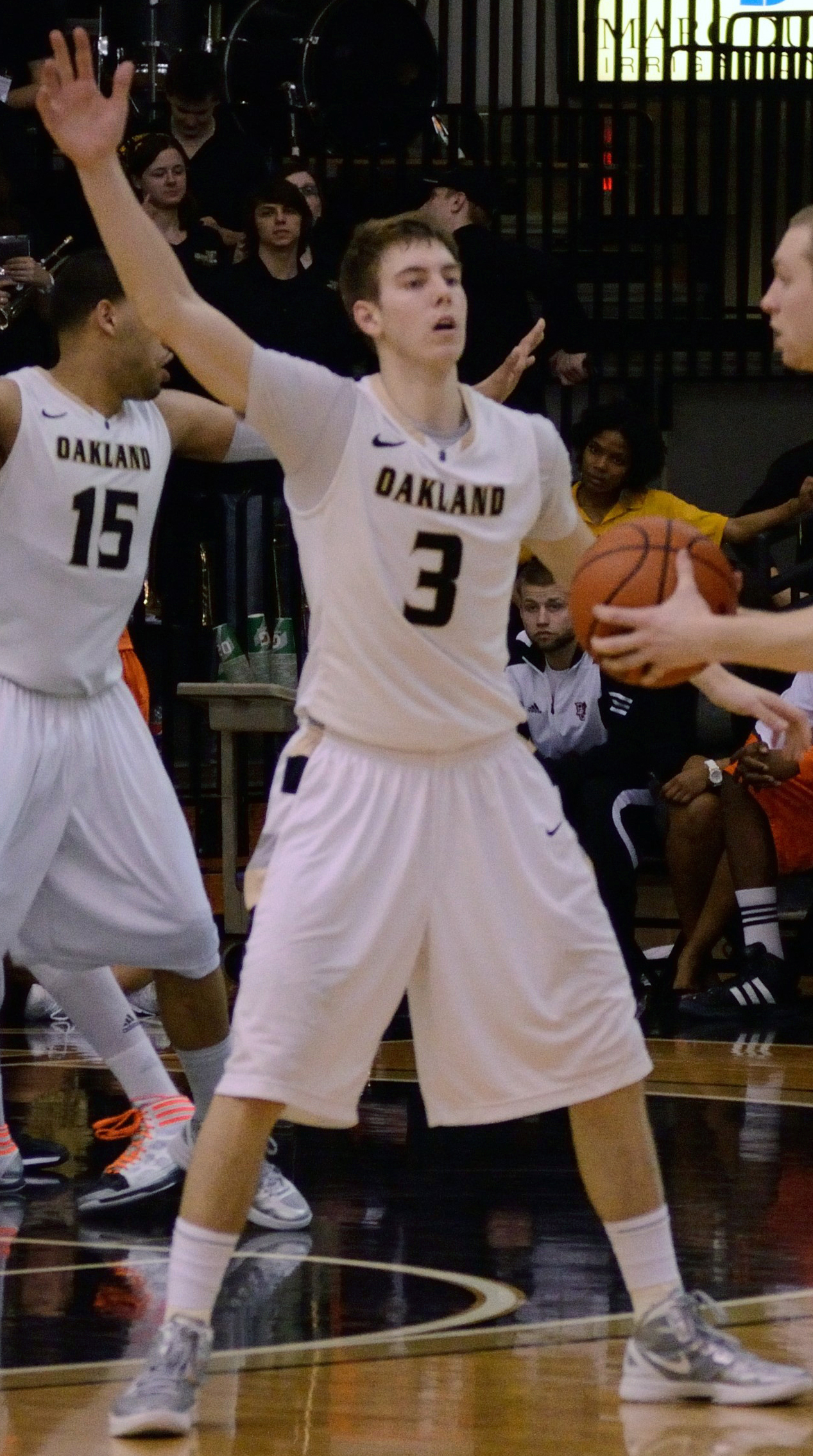
- Bader with Oakland in 2012

Brooklyn Nets
- Title: Assistant coach
- League: NBA

Personal information
- Born: July 2, 1991 (age 35) Okemos, Michigan, U.S.
- Listed height: 6 ft 5 in (1.96 m)
- Listed weight: 190 lb (86 kg)

Career information
- High school: Okemos (Okemos, Michigan)
- College: Oakland (2010–2014)
- NBA draft: 2014: undrafted
- Playing career: 2014–2020
- Position: Shooting guard
- Number: 3, 12
- Coaching career: 2024–present

Career history

Playing
- 2014: ASVEL Basket
- 2015: Rio Grande Valley Vipers
- 2015–2016: Neptūnas Klaipėda
- 2016–2017: Basket Recanati
- 2018: Faros Larissas
- 2019: Austin Spurs
- 2019: Rethymno Cretan Kings
- 2019–2020: Chocolates Trapa Palencia

Coaching
- 2024–present: Brooklyn Nets (assistant)

Career highlights
- First-team All-Horizon League (2014); First-team All-Summit League (2013); Summit League All-Newcomers Team (2011)

Richard Travis Bader (born July 2, 1991) is an American professional basketball coach and former player who is an assistant coach for the Brooklyn Nets of the National Basketball Association (NBA).

He played college basketball for Oakland University. Bader, a shooting guard, is third on the NCAA career leader for three-point field goals and field goal attempts. He led the National Collegiate Athletic Association (NCAA) Division I in three-point field goals per game during his junior season, averaging 4.21 three-pointers made per game.

== High school career ==
Bader attended Okemos High School in Okemos, Michigan. He was named the Lansing State Journal Player of the Year his senior year.

== College career ==
=== Recruiting ===
Bader's only Division I scholarship offer came from Oakland. He received many NCAA Division II scholarship offers and was invited to walk-on at Central Michigan, Detroit and The Citadel.

=== Freshman season ===
After sitting out his first year on campus, Bader came into his redshirt freshman season expecting to be a role player, but started the first game of his college career against West Virginia after he replaced a starting player that violated team rules. Bader finished that game 3–8 on three-point field goals. He started 22 of the season's 35 games and averaged 10.5 points per game in 25.7 minutes per game and shot 44% from three-point range. The 44% was the fourth-highest single-season percentage in Oakland men's basketball history.

=== Sophomore season ===
Bader led the NCAA in three-point field goals attempted (314) and finished second in three-point field goals made, finishing 10 behind the NCAA leader. Bader averaged 15.9 points per game in 36.2 minutes per game for the season. On January 26, 2012, he scored a then-career high 37 points on 10–14 3-pt FGs in a win against South Dakota State.

=== Junior season ===
During Bader's junior season in 2012–13, Bader was named to The Summit League's preseason All-League First Team. He was named The Summit League's Player of the Week once, on January 28, 2013. Bader scored 30 or more points four times throughout the season.

On January 24, Bader scored 47 points vs IUPUI. In that game, he made 15–24 field goals and 11–18 three-pointers, playing all 40 minutes of the game. Bader scored 33 points in the second half, shooting 7–9 on three-pointers. After this game and averaging 36.5 points per game the week of January 20, Bader was named National Player of the Week by ESPN's Dick Vitale, the Capital One Impact Performance of the Week and The Summit League's Player of the Week awards. In the 47-point game, Bader set an Oakland single-game record for three-point field goals made (11), scored the most points in a game in NCAA Division I that year to that point and tied the league record for most three-pointers in a game. The 47 points are the third-highest total in Oakland history.

At the conclusion of the season, Bader was named All-League First Team along with being named to the Lou Hension All-American team. Bader was also named to the Academic All-League team.

Bader led the NCAA Division I for three-point field goals per game, averaging 4.21 three-pointers made per game. He also led the NCAA in total number of three-point field goals made (139) as well as percentage of team minutes played (94.8%). Bader made at least one three-pointer in every game of the season.

Bader graduated in 2012 with a degree in communications. Since he earned his undergraduate degree and had one more year of eligibility, he was eligible to transfer without sitting out a year but decided to stay at Oakland.

=== Senior season ===
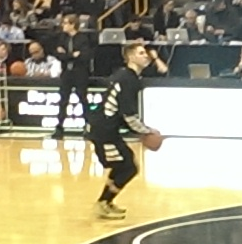
Bader during warmups in a 2014 basketball game against Cleveland State University

Prior to the season, Bader participated in the Nike Skills Academy in Washington D.C. that featured the best college wing players in the nation. He was named to the Lou Henson Award preseason All-America team along with the Horizon League preseason first team in Oakland's first season in the conference. Bader was also named 1 of 30 candidates for the 2014 Senior CLASS Award. The award recognizes NCAA Division I student athletes that excel in "community, classroom, character and competition".

Between his sophomore, junior and senior seasons, Bader made a three-point field goal in 62 consecutive games, which was the active NCAA Division I record at that time. The streak ended December 10, 2013 against Indiana. The last time prior to this Bader did not record a three-pointer was December 30, 2011, when he was 0–3 in three-point FGs against South Dakota State.

Bader was named Horizon League co-Player of the Week for the week of December 16–22. Bader made 21 three-point field goals in three games. He recorded the first double-double of his career against Illinois State and made 10 of 15 three-pointers in a loss to Eastern Michigan. He averaged 26 points per game for the week and made 58.3% of this three-pointers while Oakland went 2–1. He shared the award with Green Bay's Alec Brown. On December 27, Bader passed the 2,000 career point mark, scoring 34 points in a win over Defiance.

On February 2, 2014, Bader passed JJ Redick for the career NCAA Division I record for three-point FGs made. Five games later, Bader broke the record for the most career three-point FGs attempted.

He finished second in all of NCAA Division I basketball for free throw percentage (94.3%) that season, behind only Johnny Dee of San Diego for the 2013–14 NCAA Division I men's basketball season.

=== Statistics ===
Year	Team	GP	GS	MPG	FGM	FGA	FG%	3PM	3PA	3P%	FTM	FTA	FT%	REB	RPG	AST	APG	STL	BLK	PTS	PPG
2009–10	Oakland	Did not play – redshirt																			
2010–11	Oakland	35	22	25.7	124	283	.438	94	212	.443	25	32	.781	76	2.2	49	1.4	16	5	367	10.5
2011–12	Oakland	36	24	36.2	188	441	.426	124	314	.395	73	94	.777	115	3.2	43	1.2	31	4	573	15.9
2012–13	Oakland	33	33	38.2	206	523	.394	139	360	.386	179	202	.886	95	2.9	32	1.0	30	2	730	22.1
2013–14	Oakland	33	33	37.6	185	479	.386	147	360	.408	164	174	.943	91	2.8	47	1.4	29	3	681	20.6
Career		137	113	34.3	703	1,726	.407	504	1,246	.405	441	502	.878	377	2.8	171	1.2	106	14	2,351	17.2

Bold italics indicates led NCAA Division I

== Professional career ==
=== ASVEL Basket (2014) ===
After going undrafted in the 2014 NBA draft, Bader joined the Philadelphia 76ers for the 2014 NBA Summer League. On July 8, 2014, he signed with ASVEL Basket of the French LNB Pro A for the 2014–15 season. In December 2014, he parted ways with ASVEL after averaging just 2.2 points in 13 league games.

=== Rio Grande Valley Vipers (2015) ===
On January 30, 2015, he was acquired by the Rio Grande Valley Vipers of the NBA Development League.

=== Neptūnas Klaipėda (2015–2016) ===
On September 18, 2015, he signed with Neptūnas Klaipėda of the Lithuanian Basketball League.

=== Ambalt Recanati (2016–2017) ===
On October 10, 2016, Bader joined Ambalt Recanati.

=== Faros Larissas (2018) ===
On January 6, 2018, Bader signed with Faros Larissas of the Greek Basket League.

=== Austin Spurs (2019) ===
On February 4, 2019, the Austin Spurs announced that they had acquired Bader.

=== Brooklyn Nets (2020–21) ===
On December 9, 2020, the Brooklyn Nets announced they had hired Bader as an Assistant Coach for Player Development, thus ending his playing career.

On May 31, 2024, Bader was named as an assistant coach for the Nets.

== Overseas Elite ==
In August 2015, Bader won the 2015 installment of The Basketball Tournament as part of team Overseas Elite. In August 2016, Bader again won The Basketball Tournament as part of Overseas Elite. On August 3, 2017, Bader's team, Overseas Elite won its third straight The Basketball Tournament championship with an 86–83 victory over Team Challenge ALS on ESPN.

== Personal ==
Bader's father, Richard, was a swimmer at Clemson from 1976 to 1979, qualifying for the NCAA Men's Division I Swimming and Diving Championships each of his four years. He is currently the assistant athletic director at Michigan State. Bader has two sisters, Christine and Kimberly, the former women's tennis head coach at Ball State.

== See also ==
- List of NCAA Division I men's basketball career 3-point scoring leaders
- List of NCAA Division I men's basketball season 3-point field goal leaders
- Oakland Golden Grizzlies men's basketball statistical leaders
