= 2010–11 Oakland Golden Grizzlies men's basketball team =

American college basketball season

2010–11 Oakland Golden Grizzlies men's basketball

The Summit League regular season champions The Summit League tournament champions

NCAA tournament, Round of 64
- Conference: The Summit League
- Record: 25–10 (17–1 Summit)
- Head coach: Greg Kampe
- Assistant coaches: Jeff Tungate; Darren Sorenson; Saddi Washington
- Home arena: Athletics Center O'rena

2010–11 Summit League men's basketball standings
	Conf.				Overall
Team	W		L	PCT	W		L	PCT
Oakland †	17	–	1	.944	25	–	10	.714
Oral Roberts	13	–	5	.722	19	–	16	.543
IUPUI	12	–	6	.667	19	–	14	.576
IPFW	11	–	7	.611	18	–	12	.600
South Dakota State	10	–	8	.556	19	–	12	.613
UMKC	9	–	9	.500	16	–	14	.533
North Dakota State	8	–	10	.444	14	–	15	.483
Southern Utah	7	–	11	.389	11	–	19	.367
Western Illinois	2	–	16	.111	7	–	23	.233
Centenary *	1	–	17	.056	1	–	29	.033
† Conference tournament winner As of March 18, 2011; Rankings from AP Poll * Ineligible for conference tournament

The 2010–11 Oakland Golden Grizzlies men's basketball team were a National Collegiate Athletic Association Division I college basketball team representing Oakland University. OU won the conference regular season and conference tournament title for the second consecutive year. Oakland received The Summit League's automatic berth into the 2011 NCAA Division I men's basketball tournament as a #13 seed against #4 seeded Texas. The Golden Grizzlies lost the game 85–81.

== Preseason ==
Oakland was picked to win The Summit League championship. They received 29 of 34 first place votes. Center Keith Benson was picked as the Preseason Conference Player of the Year and named to the All-League First Team. Guard Larry Wright was named to the Second Team.

Joining the team for the 2010–11 season were guards Reggie Hamilton and Travis Bader. Hamilton was eligible to play after sitting out the 2009–10 season. Hamilton had transferred from fellow conference team UMKC. Freshman Bader began playing after his redshirt season. Also seeing significant minutes was freshman guard Ryan Bass.

== Regular season ==
Oakland was the first Division I school to clinch the conference championship. Oakland finished the season with a 34–2 record in their last 36 conference games spanning two seasons, which was the best in NCAA Division I.

=== Records ===
Oakland set The Summit League's record for most consecutive regular season conference wins with 17. The 2009–10 Oakland team tied the same record last year, which was originally set by Cleveland State during 1991–92 and 1992–93 seasons. Oakland won three more games before losing to IUPUI to set the record at 20 consecutive regular season conference wins.

Benson set The Summit League record for career blocked shots with 371. He passed the mark of 317 set by Keith Closs of Central Connecticut State University from 1994–98.

=== Player of the Week ===
Benson won the conference's player of the week away three times this season (November 29, December 20 and January 24). Point guard Reggie Hamilton won the award twice (January 18 and February 14).

=== All-league awards ===
Benson was named the conference's Player of the Year and coach Greg Kampe was named Coach of the Year. Both won the awards for the second consecutive season.

Benson and junior guard Reggie Hamilton were named to the All-League First Team. Senior forward Will Hudson was selected for the Second Team, freshman guard Bader was named to the All-Newcomer Team and senior guard Larry Wright was named the Sixth Man of the Year. Benson was also named The Summit League's Defensive Player of the Year.

=== Roster ===
No.	Name	Pos.	Height	Weight	Year	Hometown (Previous school)
52	Joey Asbury	F	6'7"	200	Fr.	Warren, MI (Mott)
3	Travis Bader	G	6'4"	180	R-Fr.	Okemos, MI (Okemos)
33	Ryan Bass	G	5'10"	160	Fr.	Dayton, OH (Dunbar)
34	Keith Benson	C	6'11"	230	R-Sr.	Farmington Hills, MI (Country Day)
22	Blake Cushingberry *	G	6'3"	249	Jr.	Romeo, MI (Romeo)
12	Ledrick Eackles	G	6'2"	196	So.	Zachary, LA (Hargrave Military Academy (VA))
23	Reggie Hamilton	G	5'11"	175	R-Jr.	Chicago, IL (UMKC)
11	Jordan Howenstine	G	6'1"	155	So.	Lansing, MI (Sexton)
4	Will Hudson	F	6'9"	235	Sr.	Madison, WI (Middleton)
13	Laval Lucas-Perry **	G	6'2"	200	R-Jr.	Flint, MI (Michigan)
50	Ilija Milutinovic	C	7'0"	252	Jr.	Niš, Serbia (Milestone Christian Academy (MO))
42	Corey Petros *	C/F	6'9"	243	Fr.	Sterling Heights, MI (Eisenhower)
40	Kyle Sikora *	C	7'0"	231	Fr.	Key Largo, FL (Florida Christian)
15	Drew Valentine	F	6'5"	225	So.	Lansing, MI (Sexton)
2	Larry Wright	G	6'2"	165	R-Sr.	Saginaw, MI (St. John's)

* Redshirting 2010–11 season
** Sitting out 2010–11 season due to transfer rules

=== Schedule ===
Date time, TV	Rank^{#}	Opponent^{#}	Result	Record	Site (attendance) city, state
November 12, 2010*; 9:00pm, ESPN Full Court		at West Virginia	L 71–95	0–1	WVU Coliseum (12,707); Morgantown, WV
November 15, 2010*; 7:00pm		at Ohio	W 78–66	1–1	Convocation Center (5,084); Athens, OH
November 21, 2010*; 7:00pm, Big Ten Network		at No. 14 Purdue; Chicago Invitational Challenge	L 67-82	1–2	Mackey Arena (14,123); West Lafayette, IN
November 23, 2010*; 7:00pm		at Wright State; Chicago Invitational Challenge	L 79-82	1–3	Nutter Center (3,327); Dayton, OH
November 26, 2010*; 3:30pm		vs. Southern; Chicago Invitational Challenge	W 105–53	2–3	Sears Centre; Hoffman Estates, IL
November 27, 2010*; 2:30pm		vs. Austin Peay; Chicago Invitational Challenge	W 78–70 ^{OT}	3–3	Sears Centre (N/A); Hoffman Estates, IL
December 2, 2010; 7:00pm		Southern Utah	W 81–65	4–3 (1–0)	Athletics Center O'rena (2.015); Rochester, MI
December 4, 2010; 6:00pm		UMKC	W 99–62	5–3 (2–0)	Athletics Center O'rena (2,505); Rochester, MI
December 8, 2010*; 8:00pm		at No. 16 Illinois	L 63-74	5–4	Assembly Hall (15,256); Champaign, IL
December 11, 2010*; 12:30pm, Fox Sports Detroit		vs. No. 7 Michigan State	L 76-77	5–5	The Palace of Auburn Hills (17,115); Auburn Hills, MI
December 14, 2010*; 7:00pm, ESPNU		at No. 7 Tennessee	W 89–82	6–5	Thompson–Boling Arena (16,784); Knoxville, TN
December 18, 2010*; 12:00pm, ESPN Full Court		at Michigan	L 51–69	6–6	Crisler Arena (9,738); Ann Arbor, MI
December 20, 2010*; 7:30pm		Rochester; Lou Henson Award Tournament	W 103–79	7–6	Athletics Center O'rena (2,435); Rochester, MI
December 21, 2010*; 7:30pm		Valparaiso; Lou Henson Award Tournament	L 102-103	7–7	Athletics Center O'rena (2,175); Rochester, MI
December 23, 2010*; 8:00pm, Big Ten Network		at No. 2 Ohio State	L 63-92	7–8	Value City Arena (13,459); Columbus, OH
December 28, 2010; 8:00pm		at Centenary	W 98–71	8–8 (3–0)	Gold Dome (661); Shreveport, LA
December 30, 2010; 8:00pm, Fox College Sports		at Oral Roberts	W 85–77	9–8 (4–0)	Mabee Center (3,035); Tulsa, OK
January 6, 2011; 7:30pm, Fox Sports Detroit		IUPUI	W 85–71	10–8 (5–0)	Athletics Center O'rena (2,615); Rochester, MI
January 8, 2011; 6:00pm		Western Illinois	W 79–50	11–8 (6–0)	Athletics Center O'rena (3,805); Rochester, MI
January 15, 2011; 7:00pm		at IPFW	W 86–68	12–8 (7–0)	Memorial Coliseum (2,969); Fort Wayne, IN
January 20, 2011; 8:00pm		at South Dakota State	W 97–88	13–8 (8–0)	Frost Arena (3,241); Brookings, SD
January 22, 2011; 8:30pm		at North Dakota State	W 83–76	14–8 (9–0)	Bison Sports Arena (3,761); Fargo, ND
January 27, 2011; 7:00pm		Oral Roberts	W 88–85	15–8 (10–0)	Athletics Center O'rena (2,615); Rochester, MI
January 29, 2011; 6:00pm		Centenary	W 100–70	16–8 (11–0)	Athletics Center O'rena (3,675); Rochester, MI
February 3, 2011; 8:00pm		at Western Illinois	W 88–65	17–8 (12–0)	Western Hall (497); Macomb, IL
February 5, 2011; 7:00pm		vs. IUPUI	L 88-100	17–9 (12–1)	Conseco Fieldhouse (2,244); Indianapolis, IN
February 12, 2011; 12:00pm, Fox Sports Detroit		IPFW	W 86–78	18–9 (13–1)	Athletics Center O'rena (2,805); Rochester, MI
February 17, 2011; 7:00pm		North Dakota State	W 71–69	19–9 (14–1)	Athletics Center O'rena (2,865); Rochester, MI
February 19, 2011; 6:00pm		South Dakota State	W 105–96	20–9 (15–1)	Athletics Center O'rena (3,934); Rochester, MI
February 24, 2011; 8:05pm		at UMKC	W 103–90	21–9 (16–1)	Swinney Recreation Center (1,159); Kansas City, MO
February 26, 2011; 9:30pm		at Southern Utah	W 82–68	22–9 (17–1)	Centrum Arena (2,413); Cedar City, UT
2011 Summit League men's basketball tournament
March 5, 2011; 7:00pm, Midco Sports Net	(1)	vs. (8) Southern Utah; Summit Quarterfinals	W 82–66	23–9	Sioux Falls Arena; Sioux Falls, SD
March 7, 2011; 7:00pm, Fox Sports Detroit	(1)	vs. (5) South Dakota State; Summit Semifinals	W 110–90	24–9	Sioux Falls Arena; Sioux Falls, SD
March 8, 2011; 9:00pm, ESPN2	(1)	vs. (2) Oral Roberts; Summit Championship Game	W 90–76	25–9	Sioux Falls Arena (2,105); Sioux Falls, SD
2011 NCAA Division I men's basketball tournament
March 18, 2011*; 12:15pm, CBS	(13 W)	vs. (4 W) Texas; NCAA Second Round	L 81–85	25–10	BOK Center (12,631); Tulsa, OK
*Non-conference game. ^{#}Rankings from AP Poll. (#) Tournament seedings in parentheses. W=NCAA West Regional. All times are in Eastern Time.
