= Jack Gohlke =

American basketball player (born 1999)

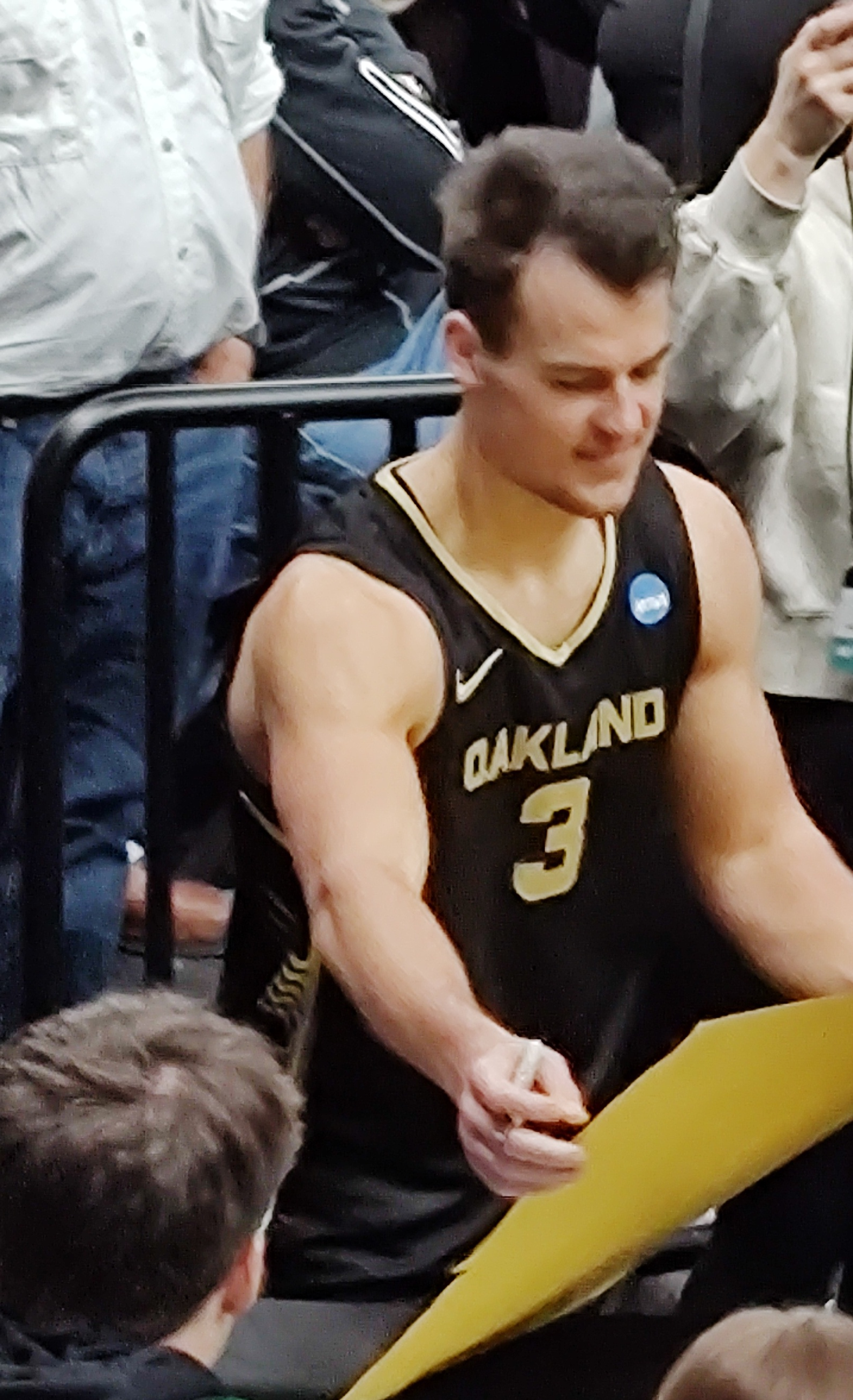
- Gohlke in 2024

Free agent
- Position: Shooting guard

Personal information
- Born: December 3, 1999 (age 26) Pewaukee, Wisconsin, U.S.
- Listed height: 6 ft 3 in (1.91 m)
- Listed weight: 215 lb (98 kg)

Career information
- High school: Pewaukee (Pewaukee, Wisconsin)
- College: Hillsdale (2019–2023); Oakland (2023–2024)
- NBA draft: 2024: undrafted
- Playing career: 2024–present

Career history
- 2024: KK Podgorica
- 2024–2025: Wisconsin Herd
- 2025: Motor City Cruise
- 2025: Ángeles de la Ciudad de México
- 2025–2026: Fortaleza Basquete Cearense
- 2026: Texas Legends

Career highlights
- Horizon League Sixth Man of the Year (2024); First-team All-G-MAC (2023)

Jack Thomas Gohlke (born December 3, 1999) is an American professional basketball player who last played for the Texas Legends of the NBA G League. He played college basketball for the Hillsdale Chargers and Oakland Golden Grizzlies.

== College career ==
Gohlke began his college career at Hillsdale College. He helped Hillsdale reach the Division II Elite Eight as a junior and averaged 9.6 points per game. As a senior, he averaged 14.2 points, 29.7 minutes, 4.2 rebounds and 2.2 assists per game. Following the season, he transferred to Oakland, taking advantage of the additional season of eligibility granted due to the COVID-19 pandemic. Against Kentucky in the first round of the NCAA Tournament, Gohlke scored 32 points, making ten three-pointers and helping lead Oakland to an 80–76 upset victory. Gohlke gained popularity during the tournament, and subsequently signed multiple name, image, and likeness (NIL) deals. (Note: Attributed to multiple sources:) Gohlke averaged 13.1 points and 4.1 rebounds per game. His style was unique because out of the 372 shots he took during the season, 364, or 97 percent, were three point attempts.

== Professional career ==
=== KK Podgorica (2024) ===
After going undrafted in the 2024 NBA draft, Gohlke joined the Oklahoma City Thunder for the 2024 NBA Summer League and on August 12, 2024, he signed with KK Podgorica of the Prva A Liga. In 10 games, he averaged 6.6 points, 2.5 rebounds and 0.8 assists in 14.7 minutes.

=== Wisconsin Herd (2024–2025) ===
On December 26, 2024, Gohlke joined the Wisconsin Herd of the NBA G League.

=== Motor City Cruise (2025) ===
On March 7, 2025, Gohlke was traded to the Motor City Cruise in exchange for ShawnDre' Jones.

=== Ángeles de la Ciudad de México (2025) ===
On April 14, 2025, Gohlke signed with the Ángeles de la Ciudad de México of the CIBACOPA in Mexico.

=== Fortaleza Basquete Cearense (2025–2026) ===
On September 10, 2025, Gohlke signed with Fortaleza Basquete Cearense of the Novo Basquete Brasil (NBB) in Brazil.

=== Texas Legends (2026) ===
On February 9, 2026, Gohlke's contractual rights were acquired by the Texas Legends of the NBA G League.

== Career statistics ==
Legend
GP	Games played	GS	Games started	MPG	Minutes per game
FG%	Field goal percentage	3P%	3-point field goal percentage	FT%	Free throw percentage
RPG	Rebounds per game	APG	Assists per game	SPG	Steals per game
BPG	Blocks per game	PPG	Points per game	**Bold**	Career high

=== College ===
Year	Team	GP	GS	MPG	FG%	3P%	FT%	RPG	APG	SPG	BPG	PPG
2023–24	Oakland	36	15	31.5	.379	.376	.785	4.1	1.1	.7	.1	13.1

== See also ==
- List of NCAA Division I men's basketball season 3-point field goal leaders
