= Kay Felder =

American basketball player (born 1995)

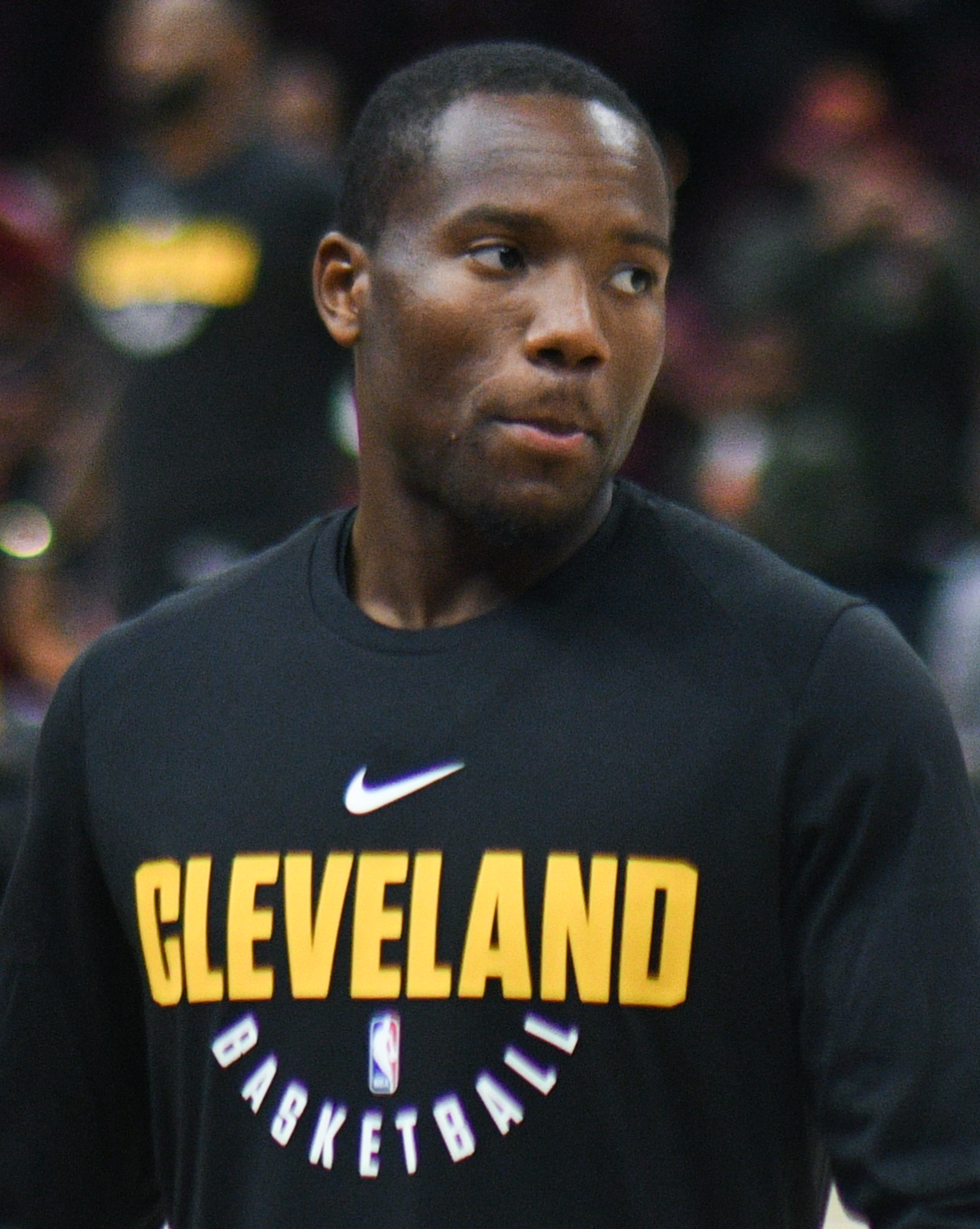
- Felder with the Cleveland Cavaliers in 2017

No. 20 – Victoria Libertas Pesaro
- Position: Point guard
- League: Serie A2

Personal information
- Born: March 29, 1995 (age 31) Detroit, Michigan, U.S.
- Listed height: 5 ft 9 in (1.75 m)
- Listed weight: 176 lb (80 kg)

Career information
- High school: Pershing (Detroit, Michigan)
- College: Oakland (2013–2016)
- NBA draft: 2016: 2nd round, 54th overall pick
- Drafted by: Atlanta Hawks
- Playing career: 2016–present

Career history
- 2016–2017: Cleveland Cavaliers
- 2016–2017: →Canton Charge
- 2017: Chicago Bulls
- 2017: →Windy City Bulls
- 2018: Detroit Pistons
- 2018: →Grand Rapids Drive
- 2018: Raptors 905
- 2019–2020: Xinjiang Flying Tigers
- 2021: Zhejiang Guangsha Lions
- 2021–2023: Shanxi Loongs
- 2023–2024: Beijing Royal Fighters
- 2024: Nanjing Monkey Kings
- 2025: Criollos de Caguas
- 2025–present: Victoria Libertas Pesaro

Career highlights
- CBA International MVP (2022); Third-team All-American – AP, NABC, SN (2016); NCAA assists leader (2016); Horizon League Player of the Year (2016); 2× First-team All-Horizon League (2015, 2016); Horizon League Freshman of the Year (2014)
- Stats at NBA.com
- Stats at Basketball Reference

Kahlil Ameer "Kay" Felder Jr. (born March 29, 1995) is an American professional basketball player for Victoria Libertas Pesaro of the Serie A2. Felder, a 5-foot-9-inch (1.75 m) point guard, declared for the 2016 NBA draft at the conclusion of his junior year at Oakland, and was drafted in the second round. Felder is the Horizon League career assists leader.

== High school career ==
Felder attended Pershing High School in Detroit, Michigan where he was named Public School League MVP his senior season. His senior year, he finished fourth in Mr. Basketball of Michigan voting.

He was not heavily recruited by high-major colleges and was noticed by Oakland assistant coach Saddi Washington. Felder was also recruited by Akron, Southern Illinois and St. Bonaventure. Oakland offered Felder a scholarship when he was a sophomore and he committed prior to his senior season. To show their commitment to him, Oakland did not recruit a point guard the season before he arrived so Felder knew there would be no competition.

== College career ==
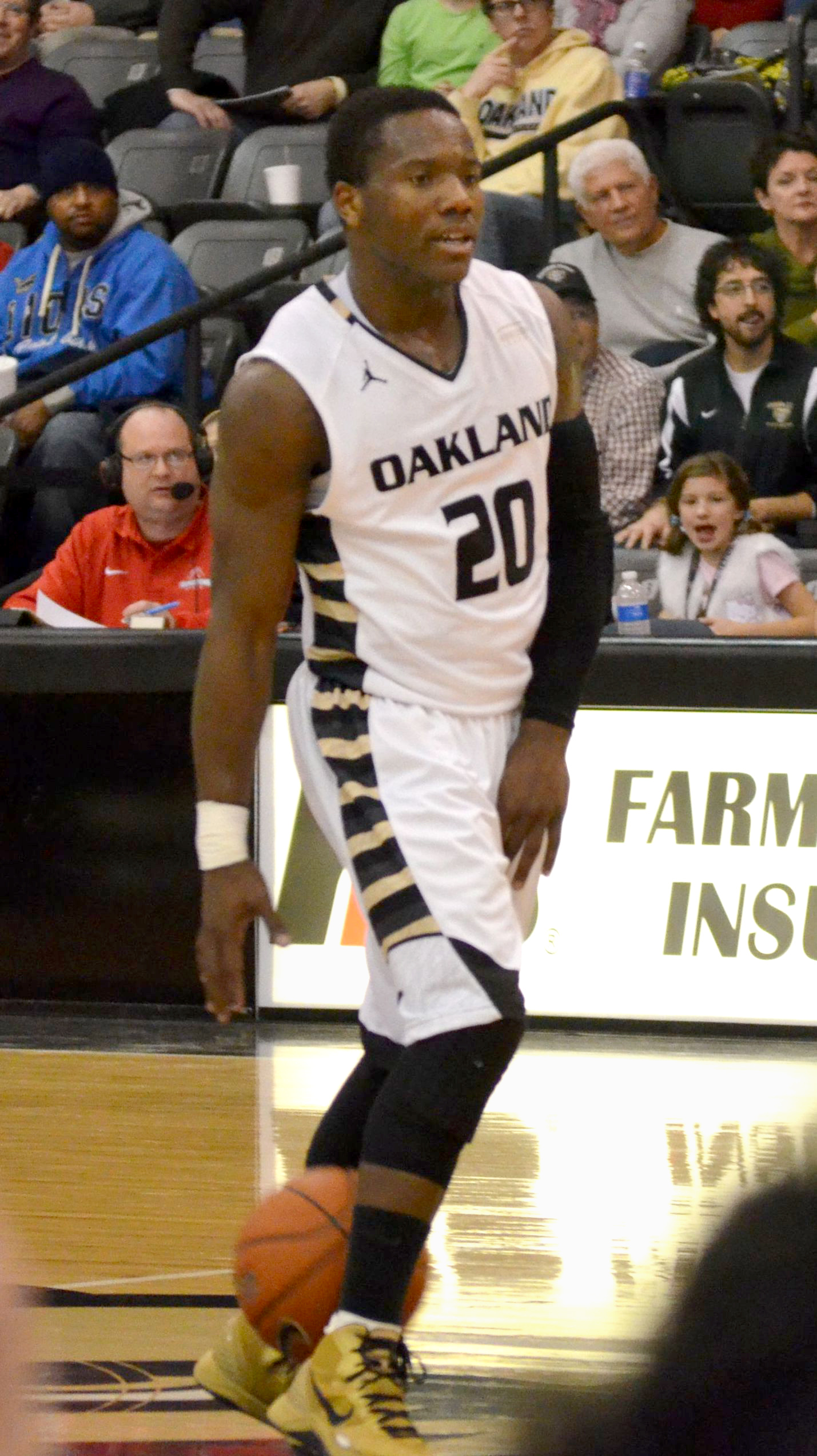
Felder with Oakland University in 2014

In 2013–14, Felder was named the Horizon League Freshman of the Year. As a sophomore in 2014–15, Felder finished second in the National Collegiate Athletic Association (NCAA) with 7.6 assists per game, two assists behind the leader, Jalan West of Northwestern State. He was also a finalist for the Lou Henson Award, given to the "Mid-Major Player of the Year".

=== Junior year (2015–16) ===
As a junior in 2015–16, Felder was consistently being evaluated as an NBA prospect, with professional scouts having attended Oakland's games. In December, playing against Washington, then-No. 1 Michigan State, and then-No. 5 Virginia, Felder averaged 35 points, 7 assists and made 47.9% of his field goals. Oakland led at halftime of each of those games, beating Washington, but losing to Michigan State and Virginia. Felder scored 37 points with nine assists against Michigan State in a 99–93 overtime loss at The Palace of Auburn Hills.

Felder was named a top-five finalist for the Bob Cousy Award, given to the top male point guard in Division I. He was also named the mid-season recipient of the Lute Olson Award, given annually to the most outstanding non-freshman men's college basketball player in NCAA Division I. He was placed on the mid-season watch list for the Naismith College Player of the Year.

Felder won the NCAA Player of the Week award on February 9, 2016. He also won six Horizon League Player of the Week awards during the season, tying the Horizon League record.

Despite using only three of his four years of college eligibility, Felder broke the Horizon League career assists mark of 699, which was originally set by Ralph Lee of Xavier in 1986. Felder also set the Oakland school record for consecutive free throws made, making 46 in a row with his last miss on January 29. Felder was named the Horizon League Player of the Year and earned All-Horizon League First Team honors.

On April 5, 2016, Felder declared for the 2016 NBA draft, forgoing his final year of college eligibility.

=== College statistics ===
Year	Team	GP	GS	MPG	FGM	FGA	FG%	3PM	3PA	3P%	FTM	FTA	FT%	REB	RPG	AST	APG	STL	BLK	PTS	PPG
2013–14	Oakland	33	33	32.4	102	254	.402	20	62	.323	90	119	.756	129	3.9	212	6.4	29	4	314	9.5
2014–15	Oakland	33	33	38.5	183	434	.422	47	139	.338	185	224	.826	158	4.8	252	7.6	66	8	598	18.1
2015–16	Oakland	35	35	36.7	269	612	.440	76	214	.355	239	282	.848	149	4.3	324	9.3	69	7	853	24.4
Career		101	101	35.9	554	1,300	.426	143	415	.345	514	625	.822	436	4.3	788	7.8	164	19	1,765	17.5

Bold italics indicates led NCAA Division I

== Professional career ==
=== Cleveland Cavaliers (2016–2017) ===
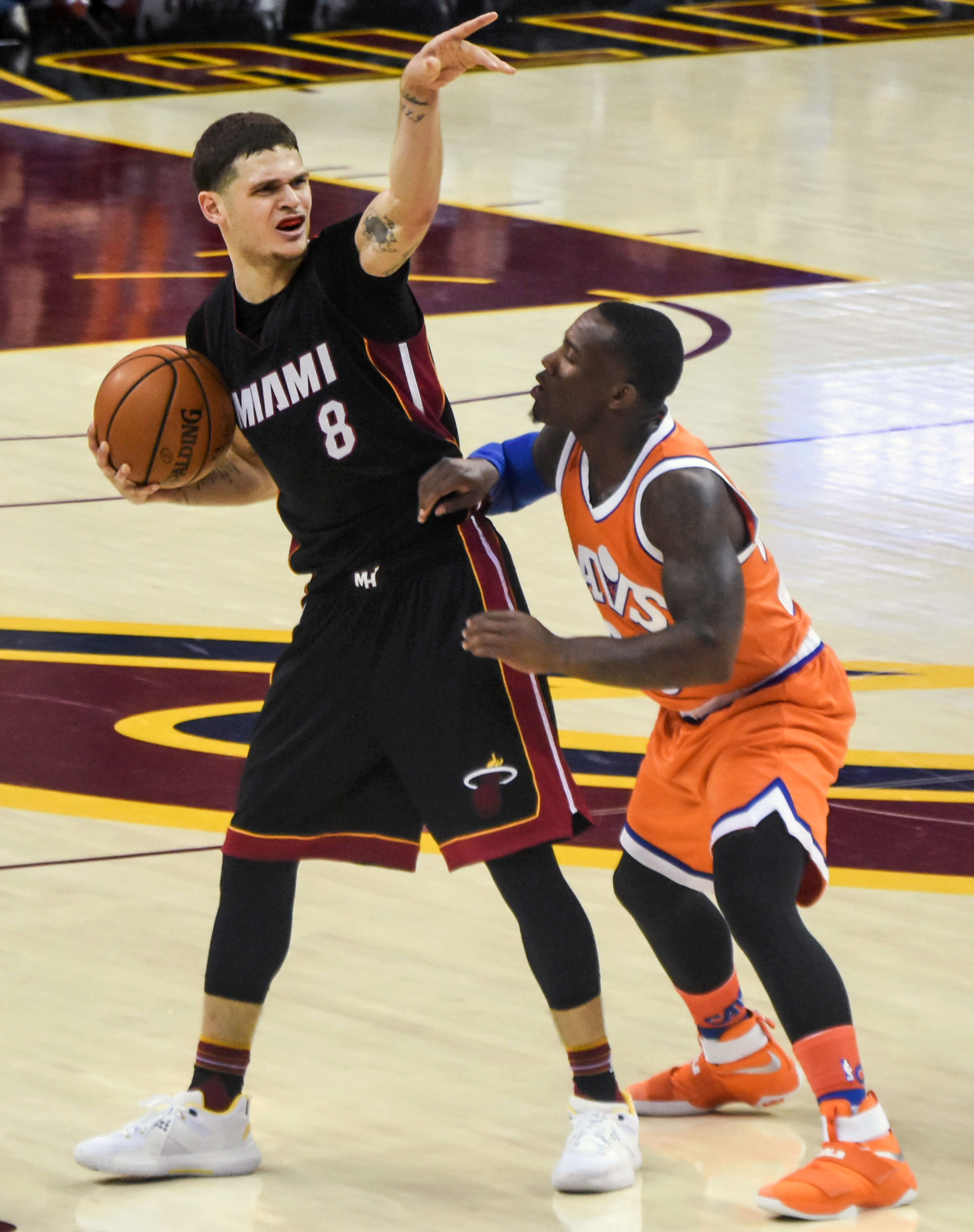
Felder guards Tyler Johnson of the Miami Heat in 2016.

During the 2016 NBA Draft Combine, the 5-foot-9-inch (1.75 m) Felder tied Pat Connaughton for the second-highest maximum vertical leap recorded in draft combine history at 44 inches (110 cm). Despite his high marks in the draft combine, Felder was still projected to be a late-second-round draft pick, with the risk that he would perhaps not get drafted altogether. Felder was selected by the Atlanta Hawks with the 54th overall pick. He was later traded to the Cleveland Cavaliers on draft night, and in July 2016, he joined the Cavaliers for the 2016 NBA Summer League. On August 6, 2016, he signed a three-year, $2.4 million contract with the Cavaliers. He made his debut for the Cavaliers in their third game of the season on October 29, scoring two points in five minutes off the bench in a 105–99 win over the Orlando Magic. On December 14, with Kyrie Irving resting, Felder scored a season-high 14 in 23 minutes in a 93–85 loss to the Memphis Grizzlies. During his rookie season, he had multiple assignments with the Canton Charge of the NBA Development League.

On October 14, 2017, Felder was traded, along with Richard Jefferson, two future second-round draft picks and cash considerations, to the Atlanta Hawks in exchange for the rights to Sergiy Gladyr and Dimitrios Agravanis. He was immediately waived by the Hawks.

=== Chicago Bulls (2017) ===
On October 16, 2017, Felder was claimed off waivers by the Chicago Bulls. He was waived by the Bulls on December 19, 2017. He appeared in 14 games for Chicago and averaged 3.9 points, 1.0 rebounds and 1.4 assists in 9.6 minutes. He also played in three games for the Windy City Bulls and averaged 17.3 points, 3.6 rebounds and 4.6 assists, while shooting 45.2 percent from the field (19-of-42).

=== Detroit Pistons (2018) ===
On January 15, 2018, Felder signed a two-way contract with the Detroit Pistons, thus splitting his time between the Pistons and their NBA G League affiliate, the Grand Rapids Drive.

=== Raptors 905 (2018) ===
On August 21, 2018, Felder signed with the Toronto Raptors. On October 12, 2018 Felder was waived by the Raptors, just before the start of the regular season. He was then added to the Raptors' G League affiliate, the Raptors 905. On December 3, 2018, Felder was waived by the Raptors 905 released after his arrest over a charge of domestic violence.

=== Xinjiang Flying Tigers (2019–2020) ===
On March 25, 2019, Felder signed with the Xinjiang Flying Tigers. He was replaced by Ian Clark on January 14, 2020.

=== Zhejiang Guangsha Lions (2021) ===
Felder joined the Zhejiang Guangsha Lions for the 2020–21 season. He averaged 13.1 points, 5.9 assists, 4.5 rebounds, and 1.8 steals per game.

=== Shanxi Loongs (2021–2023) ===
In 2021, Felder signed with the Shanxi Loongs of the Chinese Basketball Association.

=== Beijing Royal Fighters (2023–2024) ===
In 2023, Felder joined the Beijing Royal Fighters.

=== Nanjing Monkey Kings (2024) ===
On October 21, 2024, Felder signed with Nanjing Monkey Kings of the Chinese Basketball Association (CBA).

=== Victoria Libertas Pesaro (2025–present) ===
On September 7, 2025, he signed with Victoria Libertas Pesaro of the Serie A2.

== Career statistics ==
Legend
GP	Games played	GS	Games started	MPG	Minutes per game
FG%	Field goal percentage	3P%	3-point field goal percentage	FT%	Free throw percentage
RPG	Rebounds per game	APG	Assists per game	SPG	Steals per game
BPG	Blocks per game	PPG	Points per game	**Bold**	Career high

=== NBA Regular season ===
Year	Team	GP	GS	MPG	FG%	3P%	FT%	RPG	APG	SPG	BPG	PPG
2016–17	Cleveland	**42**	0	9.2	**.392**	**.318**	.714	**1.0**	**1.4**	**.4**	**.2**	**4.0**
2017–18	Chicago	14	0	**9.6**	.303	.222	**.971**	**1.0**	**1.4**	.2	.1	3.9
2017–18	Detroit	2	0	3.0	.250	.000	.000	2.0	0.0	.0	.0	1.0
Career		58	0	9.2	.363	.268	.754	1.0	1.4	.4	.1	3.9

=== CBA ===
==== Regular season ====
Year	Team	GP	GS	MPG	FG%	3P%	FT%	RPG	APG	SPG	BPG	PPG
2020–21	Zhejiang	14	4	28.4	.408	.298	**.966**	4.5	5.9	1.8	0.1	13.1
2021–22	Shanxi	**35**	**34**	**31.9**	**.444**	**.335**	.886	**6.5**	**10.0**	**2.6**	**0.2**	**24.7**
2022–23	Shanxi	**41**	**35**	**29.9**	**.457**	**.350**	.875	**1.8**	**8.7**	**1.8**	**0.3**	**21.4**

==== Playoffs ====
Year	Team	GP	GS	MPG	FG%	3P%	FT%	RPG	APG	SPG	BPG	PPG
2020–21	Zhejiang	2	0	28.3	.444	.444	.833	5.0	4.5	1.0	0.0	23.0
2021–22	Shanxi	5	5	28.2	.423	.378	.815	5.4	10.0	1.5	0.2	23.6
2022–23	Shanxi	2	1	29.0	.405	.200	.000	2.5	10.0	1.5	0.5	18.0

Source: basketball-stats.de (date: March 26, 2022)

== Personal life ==
Felder's father, Kahlil Felder Sr., played basketball at Eastern Michigan from 1990 to 1992. Felder is the cousin of former NBA player Steve Smith.

== See also ==
- List of shortest players in National Basketball Association history
