= Oakland Golden Grizzlies men's basketball =

College men's basketball team representing Oakland University

Oakland Golden Grizzlies
2026–27 Oakland Golden Grizzlies men's basketball team
- University: Oakland University
- Head coach: Greg Kampe (43rd season)
- Location: Auburn Hills, Michigan
- Arena: OU Credit Union O'rena (capacity: 4,005)
- Conference: Horizon League
- Nickname: Golden Grizzlies
- Colors: Black and gold

NCAA Division I tournament round of 32
- 1994*, 1997*, 2024

NCAA Division I tournament appearances
- 1994*, 1995*, 1996*, 1997*, 2005, 2010, 2011, 2024

Conference tournament champions
- Summit League: 2005, 2010, 2011; Horizon League: 2024

Conference regular-season champions
- Great Lakes Intercollegiate Athletic Conference; 1996, 1997 Summit League; 2000, 2010, 2011 Horizon League; 2017, 2024

Uniforms
Home	Away
- * at Division II level

The Oakland Golden Grizzlies men's basketball team represents Oakland University in Auburn Hills, Michigan, United States. The school's team competes in the Horizon League and plays their home games at the Athletics Center O'rena. The Golden Grizzlies are coached by Greg Kampe. Kampe is the longest-tenured active Division I head coach. Oakland last played in the NCAA Division I men's basketball tournament in 2024.

Through the 2022–23 season, Oakland has made a three-point field goal in 1,093 consecutive games, the fourth-longest active NCAA Division I streak. They last finished a game without a three-pointer on January 30, 1988.

== History ==
The Oakland men's basketball program began competing in the 1967 season, 10 years after the university opened. Originally nicknamed the Pioneers, they won their first NCAA game 109–106 in overtime against Albion. The Pioneers were without a conference until 1974 when they joined the Great Lakes Intercollegiate Athletic Conference (GLIAC).

The first year as members of the GLIAC, Oakland hired Greg Kampe, who is still the head coach at the university. Kampe had the fifth-longest tenure of all active Division I coaches, as of 2012. Oakland won two regular season GLIAC championships, in 1995–96 and 1996–97, their final two seasons in the league. In a 1993 game against Madonna, Oakland scored 91 points in the first half, on their way to a 189–107 victory. That game set school records for most points in a half (98) and largest margin of victory (82). The next three seasons, OU scored more than 100 points 30 times, winning 29 of those games.

Oakland played at the Division II level until 1997 when they changed their nickname to the Golden Grizzlies and began the transition to Division I. OU opened the Athletics Center O'rena in 1998 against Michigan State. When the O'rena was being built, home basketball games were played in the Sports Dome, an inflatable "bubble" used for practice by Oakland's athletic teams during the winter. The original basketball stadium was in the Hollie L. Lepley Sports Center.

The Golden Grizzlies completed the transition to Division I in 1999 and joined the Mid-Continent Conference (now known as The Summit League).

The Golden Grizzlies joined the Horizon League starting in the 2013–14 season.

In 2021, The Golden Grizzlies lose their 1,000 day streak of winning against Detroit Mercy.

In 2022, Oakland looks to build upon this game to challenge for its first Horizon League trophy since 2017.

In the 2023–24 season, the Golden Grizzlies won the Horizon League Tournament for the first time, securing an automatic bid to that season's NCAA Tournament. In the Round of 64, the 14th seeded Golden Grizzlies upset #3 Kentucky, 80–76, shocking the country and sending shockwaves throughout the tournament. Senior transfer Jack Gohlke caught the nation's eye with 10 three-pointers in the game, ending with 32 points. Kampe labelled it the "biggest win of (his) career" in post-game interviews.

=== Conference affiliation ===
The Golden Grizzlies first joined a Division I conference in 1998 when they joined the Mid-Continent Conference (now known as the Summit League). Oakland joined the Horizon League July 1, 2013.

Period	Conference	NCAA classif.
1967–68 to 1973–74	Independent	Division II
1974–75 to 1996–97	Great Lakes Intercollegiate Athletic Conference (GLIAC)	Division II
1997–98	Independent	Division I
1998–99 to 2012–13	Summit League (Note: Formerly known as Mid-Continent Conference until 2007.)	Division I
2013–14 to present	Horizon League	Division I

== Postseason history ==
Oakland competed in NCAA Division II since the inception of the basketball program in 1967 until they moved to NCAA Division I in 1997. The Golden Grizzlies reached the Division II postseason four times in their final four seasons at that level.

=== NCAA Division I Tournament results ===
The Golden Grizzlies have appeared in four Division I NCAA Tournaments. Their overall record is 2–4.

Year	Seed	Round	Opponent	Result
2005	#16	Opening Round; First Round	#16 Alabama A&M #1 North Carolina	W 79–69; L 68–96
2010	#14	First Round	#3 Pittsburgh	L 66–89
2011	#13	First Round	#4 Texas	L 81–85
2024	#14	First Round; Second Round	#3 Kentucky #11 NC State	W 80–76; L 73–79 ^{OT}

=== NCAA Division II Tournament results ===
Oakland appeared in four Division II NCAA Tournaments. Their overall record was 3–5.

Year	Round	Opponent	Result
1994	First Round; Regional Semifinals; Regional Third Place	Quincy; Wayne State; Kentucky Wesleyan	W 105–98; L 97–99; L 91–118
1995	First Round	Quincy	L 94–116
1996	First Round	Northern State	L 92–98
1997	First Round; Regional Semifinals; Regional Finals	Grand Valley State; Indianapolis; Northern Kentucky	W 79–74; W 75–72; L 87–101

=== NIT results ===
The Golden Grizzlies have appeared in one National Invitation Tournament. Their overall record is 1–1.

Year	Round	Opponent	Result
2017	First Round; Second Round	Clemson; Richmond	W 74–69; L 83–87

=== Vegas 16 results ===
The Golden Grizzlies participated in the first and only Vegas 16. Their record was 2–1.

Year	Round	Opponent	Result
2016	Quarterfinals; Semifinals; Finals	Towson; East Tennessee State; Old Dominion	W 90–72; W 104–81; L 67–68

=== CIT results ===
The Golden Grizzlies have appeared in Four CollegeInsider.com Postseason Tournaments (CIT). Their overall record is 4–4.

Year	Round	Opponent	Result
2009	First Round; Quarterfinals	Kent State; Bradley	W 80–74; L 75–76
2012	First Round; Second Round; Quarterfinals; Semifinals	Bowling Green; Buffalo; Rice; Utah State	W 86–69; W 84–76; W 77–70; L 81–105
2013	First Round	Youngstown State	L 87–99
2015	First Round	Eastern Illinois	L 91–97

== All-time win–loss record ==
Through 2022–23 season

Record table
Season	Coach	Overall	Conference	Standing	Postseason
Dick Robinson (1967–1968)
1967–68	Robinson	6–15			
Dick Robinson:		6–15			
Gene Bolden (1968–1976)
1968–69	Bolden	11–10			
1969–70	Bolden	9–14			
1970–71	Bolden	14–12			
1971–72	Bolden	14–12			
1972–73	Bolden	15–11			
1973–74	Bolden	17–11			
1974–75	Bolden	4–22	2–9		
1975–76	Bolden	5–22	3–13		
Gene Bolden:		89–114	5–22		
Jim Mitchell (1976–1979)
1976–77	Mitchell	9–19	5–11		
1977–78	Mitchell	6–22	3–11		
1978–79	Mitchell, Frederick	12–15	5–9		
Jim Mitchell:		27–56	13–31		
Lee Frederick (1979–1984)
1979–80	Frederick	13–14	3–11		
1980–81	Frederick	8–19	3–13		
1981–82	Frederick	18–9	8–8		
1982–83	Frederick	11–16	4–12		
1983–84	Frederick	13–14	7–9		
Lee Frederick:		63–72	25–53		
Greg Kampe (1984–present)
1984–85	Kampe	13–15	5–11	T-7th	
1985–86	Kampe	13–15	5–11	8th	
1986–87	Kampe	20–8	10–6	4th	
1987–88	Kampe	19–9	11–5	3rd	
1988–89	Kampe	20–8	10–6	3rd	
1989–90	Kampe	19–9	10–6	4th	
1990–91	Kampe	16–13	10–6	3rd	
1991–92	Kampe	16–13	8–8	T-4th	
1992–93	Kampe	15–11	9–7	T-3rd	
1993–94	Kampe	21–10	11–7	4th	NCAA Regional Semi-Final
1994–95	Kampe	20–9	12–6	2nd	NCAA First Round
1995–96	Kampe	21–8	13–5	T-1st	NCAA First Round
1996–97	Kampe	24–7	14–3	1st (South)	NCAA Regional Final
1997–98	Kampe	15–12			
1998–99	Kampe	12–15	8–8	N/A	
1999–00	Kampe	13–17	11–5	1st	
2000–01	Kampe	12–16	8–8	5th	
2001–02	Kampe	17–13	10–4	T-2nd	
2002–03	Kampe	17–11	10–4	T-2nd	
2003–04	Kampe	13–17	6–10	T-7th	
2004–05	Kampe	13–19	7–9	T-5th	NCAA First Round
2005–06	Kampe	11–18	6–10	7th	
2006–07	Kampe	19–14	10–4	2nd	
2007–08	Kampe	17–14	11–7	3rd	
2008–09	Kampe	23–13	13–5	3rd	CIT quarterfinals
2009–10	Kampe	26–9	17–1	1st	NCAA first round
2010–11	Kampe	25–10	17–1	1st	NCAA first round
2011–12	Kampe	20–16	11–7	3rd	CIT semifinals
2012–13	Kampe	16–17	10–6	4th	CIT first round
2013–14	Kampe	13–20	7–9	T-5th	
2014–15	Kampe	16–17	11–5	T-3rd	CIT first round
2015–16	Kampe	23–12	13–5	T-2nd	Vegas 16 finals
2016–17	Kampe	25–9	14–4	T-1st	NIT second round
2017–18	Kampe	19–14	10–8	4th	
2018–19	Kampe	16–17	11–7	3rd	
2019–20	Kampe	14–19	8–10	6th	
2020–21	Kampe	12–18	10–10	5th	
2021–22	Kampe	20–12	12–7	5th	
2022–23	Kampe	13–19	11–9	5th	
2023–24	Kampe	24–12	13–5	1st	NCAA second round
2024–25	Kampe	16–18	11–9	6th	
Greg Kampe:		710–544	385–247		
Total:		850–756			
National champion Postseason invitational champion Conference regular season champion Conference regular season and conference tournament champion Division regular season champion Division regular season and conference tournament champion Conference tournament champion

== Rivalries ==
=== Detroit Mercy Titans ===
The rivalry between the Detroit Mercy Titans and Oakland is known as the Metro Series. Oakland has historically dominated the series since its inception, with Detroit Mercy having only won three games against them since the Golden Grizzlies first joined the Horizon League and winning ten straight matchups from 2017 to 2021. Oakland leads the series against Detroit Mercy 20–10. Both schools first played against each other in 1985 with Detroit Mercy winning the first matchup against Oakland 77–62. Oakland won the last matchup in 2023 65–50.

== Media ==
OU men's basketball games are broadcast on WDFN (1130 AM). The play-by-play commentator is Neal Ruhl, with former Oakland and professional player, Dan Waterstradt. Oakland home games are simulcast on ESPN3, WMYD and WDFN.

Mario Impemba, also the play-by-play commentator for the Detroit Tigers on Fox Sports Detroit, broadcast Oakland games from 2006 to 2013.

== Oakland players who played in the NBA ==
- Keith Benson
- Jamal Cain
- Kay Felder
- Rawle Marshall
- Kendrick Nunn

== Footnotes ==
^{a} The official Oakland record book lists Reggie Hamilton in third place with 548 career assists from 2010–2012. That includes the assists he accumulated while at UMKC from 2007–2009, which is inconsistent with how the rest of the record book handles transfer player statistics.
^{b} The official Oakland record book lists Marshall's total at 199, but the addition of his individual season's statistics makes the total 198 (80 in 2002–03, 59 in 2003–04, 59 in 2004–05).
^{c} There is a discrepancy between sources for Brock's 2016–17 season block total. The official Oakland record book lists 72, while other sources list the total as 69. This is due to a difference in total blocks for the December 10, 2016, game against Robert Morris. Both school box scores list 7 blocks while ESPN and sports-reference.com list 5.
