= Reggie Hamilton =

American professional basketball player (born 1989)

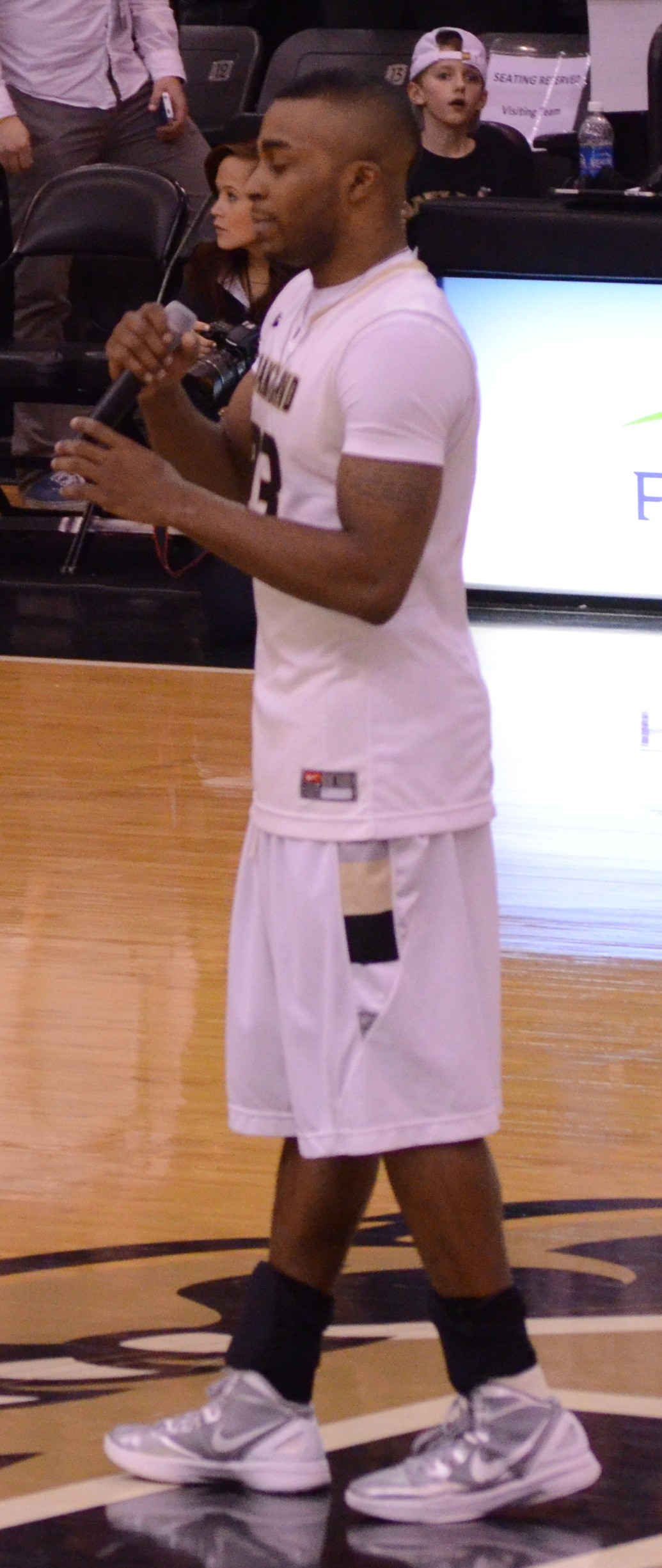
- Hamilton with the Oakland Golden Grizzlies in 2012

Personal information
- Born: May 23, 1989 (age 37) Harvey, Illinois, U.S.
- Listed height: 5 ft 11 in (1.80 m)
- Listed weight: 180 lb (82 kg)

Career information
- High school: Thornwood (South Holland, Illinois)
- College: Kansas City (2007–2009); Oakland (2010–2012)
- NBA draft: 2012: undrafted
- Playing career: 2012–2018
- Position: Point guard

Career history
- 2012: VL Pesaro
- 2012–2013: Ferentino
- 2013–2014: Idaho Stampede
- 2014: Siarka Tarnobrzeg
- 2015: Scafati
- 2015: Chieti
- 2016: Niigata Albirex
- 2017: Al-Shamal
- 2017: Quimsa
- 2017: Titanes del Distrito
- 2018: Windsor Express

Career highlights
- Frances Pomeroy Naismith Award (2012); NCAA scoring champion (2012); 2× First-team All-Summit League (2011, 2012); Summit League All-Freshman team (2008)

Reginald Lamont Hamilton Jr. (born May 23, 1989) is an American former professional basketball player. In 2011–12, his senior year at Oakland University, Hamilton averaged 26.2 points per game to lead all of NCAA Division I in scoring. He scored 2,188 points between his time spent at UMKC and Oakland.

== Early life ==
Hamilton was born in Harvey, Illinois to Calvin Hamilton and Deborah Horne. He attended Thornwood High School where he was a three-year varsity letter winner. Twice he was named an All-SICA East Conference and all-region honoree, and in his senior season he averaged 17.7 points, 6.0 rebounds, 5.0 assists and 4.0 steals per game en route to a 23–7 overall record. During his college recruitment process, Hamilton eventually decided to accept a scholarship to the University of Missouri–Kansas City (UMKC) to play for the Kangaroos.

== College career ==
=== UMKC ===
Hamilton enrolled at UMKC in 2007 and made an immediate impact for the Kangaroos. In his freshman season he averaged 11.7 points, 3.3 assists and 3.2 rebounds per game. UMKC finished 14–22 but he was named to the Summit League All-Newcomer Team and was the only true freshman to receive that honor. He finished third on the team in scoring and surpassed the 20-point threshold on three occasions. On November 11, 2007, in his collegiate debut at Kansas (who would later go on to win the 2008 national championship), Hamilton scored 16 points and recorded six assists in a loss. At the season's end, UMKC presented him with the Jim and Sally Job Award, given annually to the school's promising student-athlete.

The following season, his sophomore campaign in 2008–09, his 12.6 points per game was second on the team and surpassed 20 points five times. He played in 21 games, started in 15 of them, and scored 265 points. Despite personal success, Hamilton asked for a release from the team following the game against Centenary on January 24, 2009. He was granted the release, and thus in his final game as a Kangaroo he registered 13 points, five rebounds and four steals.

=== Oakland ===
Due to NCAA eligibility rules regarding transferring schools, Hamilton was forced to sit out the 2009–10 season in his first year as a Golden Grizzly. The following year, his first as an eligible player for Oakland, he scored 17.6 points per game, made 82 three-point field goals, and was named to the All-Summit League First Team. Two of the more notable games for him on the season include the January 29, 2011 contest against Centenary in which Hamilton scored his 1,000th career point, and on February 24 in a game against his former school UMKC, Hamilton registered 28 points behind a 10-of-14 shooting performance. For the second consecutive season, Oakland won both the regular season and conference tournament championships en route to earning a berth into the 2011 NCAA Tournament. They were designated a #13 seed and played #4 Texas in the round of 64. Oakland lost the game 85–81 to end their season. During the regular season, Oakland set a Summit League men's basketball record for consecutive conference wins with 20.

Prior to the 2011–12 season, Hamilton was named a co-captain by his coaching staff and was also tabbed the fourth best college point guard according to Lindy's Magazine. Among other preseason honors, he was also named the 96th best player in all of college basketball. Hamilton lived up to the billing as he guided the Golden Grizzlies to a berth in the 2012 CollegeInsider.com Postseason Tournament (CIT) after finishing the regular season 17–15 (11–7 in conference play), which placed them third in The Summit League regular season standings. Hamilton was named the Summit League Male Athlete of the Month for February 2012 after averaging 30.7 points per game throughout the month and in the process broke the conference's single-season scoring record. On the year, Hamilton scored 942 points; 39 of those came in the first-round game of the CIT in which he registered a tournament-record against Toledo. In his final collegiate game, a 105–81 loss to Utah State in the CIT Final Four, Hamilton scored 26 points. The Golden Grizzlies finished the year with a 20–16 overall record and set a new Summit League record with three postseason wins during its run to the CIT Final Four. On March 23, 2012, Hamilton was named the recipient of the Frances Pomeroy Naismith Award. It is a national award that is given to the most outstanding senior who is 6 ft 0 in (1.83 m) or shorter.

=== Statistics ===
Year	Team	GP	GS	MPG	FGM	FGA	FG%	3PM	3PA	3P%	FTM	FTA	FT%	REB	RPG	AST	APG	STL	BLK	PTS	PPG
2007–08	UMKC	31	21	29.9	116	273	.425	43	111	.387	87	114	.763	100	3.2	101	3.3	36	6	362	11.7
2008–09	UMKC	21	15		83	220	.377	34	100	.340	65	88	.739	56	2.7	75	3.6	31	0	265	12.6
2009–10	Oakland	Did not play – redshirt																			
2010–11	Oakland	35	34	28.8	207	423	.489	82	221	.371	120	143	.839	86	2.5	187	5.3	46	7	616	17.6
2011–12	Oakland	36	36	35.7	281	630	.446	118	281	.420	262	299	.876	137	3.8	185	5.1	72	2	942	26.2
Career		123	106		687	1546	.444	277	713	.389	534	644	.829	379	3.1	548	4.5	185	15	2185	17.8

Bold italics indicates led NCAA Division I

== Professional career ==
After going undrafted in the 2012 NBA draft, Hamilton joined the Indiana Pacers for the 2012 NBA Summer League.

In August 2012, Hamilton signed his first professional contract with Victoria Libertas Pesaro of Italy. In December 2012, he left Pesaro and moved to FMC Ferentino. On February 27, 2013, he was acquired by the Idaho Stampede. In November 2013, he was re-acquired by the Stampede. On January 4, 2014, he was waived by the Stampede.

On January 29, 2014, Hamilton signed with Stabill Jezioro Tarnobrzeg.

On January 13, 2015, Hamilton signed with Proger Chieti of the Italian A2 Silver (Italy 3rd).

== See also ==
- List of NCAA Division I men's basketball season scoring leaders
- 2010–11 Oakland Golden Grizzlies men's basketball team
- 2011–12 Oakland Golden Grizzlies men's basketball team
