= Kansas City Roos men's basketball statistical leaders =

The Kansas City Roos men's basketball statistical leaders are individual statistical leaders of the Kansas City Roos men's basketball program in various categories, including points, rebounds, assists, steals, and blocks. Within those areas, the lists identify single-game, single-season, and career leaders. The Roos represent the University of Missouri–Kansas City in the NCAA Division I Summit League.

Kansas City began competing in intercollegiate basketball in 1969. The NCAA did not officially record assists as a stat until the 1983–84 season, and blocks and steals until the 1985–86 season, but Kansas City's record books includes players in these stats before these seasons. These lists are updated through the end of the 2020–21 season.

== Scoring ==
Career
Rank	Player	Points	Seasons
1	Michael Watson	2,488	2000–01 2001–02 2002–03 2003–04
2	Tony Dumas	2,459	1990–91 1991–92 1992–93 1993–94
3	Ronnie Schmitz	1,939	1989–90 1990–91 1991–92 1992–93
4	Martez Harrison	1,652	2013–14 2014–15 2015–16 2016–17
5	Michael Jackson	1,443	1999–00 2000–01 2001–02
6	Quinton Day	1,404	2004–05 2005–06 2006–07
7	Dane Brumagin	1,374	2005–06 2006–07 2007–08 2008–09
8	David Robinson	1,211	1987–88 1988–89 1989–90 1990–91 1991–92
9	Brandon McKissic	1,181	2017–18 2018–19 2019–20 2020–21
10	Darecko Rawlins	1,078	1992–93 1993–94 1994–95 1995–96

Season
Rank	Player	Points	Season
1	Tony Dumas	753	1993–94
2	Michael Watson	740	2002–03
3	Michael Watson	680	2003–04
4	Tony Dumas	643	1992–93
5	Michael Watson	635	2001–02
6	LaVell Boyd	623	2016–17
7	Tony Dumas	601	1991–92
8	Martez Harrison	577	2014–15
9	Michael Jackson	573	1999–00
10	Ronnie Schmitz	560	1990–91

Single game
Rank	Player	Points	Season	Opponent
1	Michael Watson	54	2002–03	Oral Roberts
2	Ronnie Schmitz	51	1990–91	U.S. International
3	Tony Dumas	44	1993–94	Texas Tech
4	Tony Dumas	43	1993–94	Colorado
5	Dane Brumagin	40	2007–08	Oakland
	Michael Watson	40	2003–04	Oakland
	Tony Dumas	40	1993–94	Northeastern Illinois
	Tony Dumas	40	1990–91	U.S. International
9	Tony Dumas	38	1992–93	Texas Wesleyan
	Ronnie Schmitz	38	1989–90	Alcorn State

== Rebounds ==
Career
Rank	Player	Rebounds	Seasons
1	Spencer Johnson	710	2007–08 2008–09 2009–10 2010–11
2	Darecko Rawlins	639	1992–93 1993–94 1994–95 1995–96
3	Carlton Aaron	631	2002–03 2003–04 2004–05
4	Tony Dumas	576	1990–91 1991–92 1992–93 1993–94
	Marvin Nesbitt Jr.	576	2017–18 2018–19 2019–20 2020–21 2021–22
6	Will Palmer	554	1998–99 1999–00 2000–01 2001–02
7	David Robinson	544	1987–88 1988–89 1989–90 1990–91 1991–92
8	Fred Chatmon	528	2009–10 2011–12 2012–13 2013–14
9	Michael Jackson	489	1999–00 2000–01 2001–02
10	Trinity Hall	459	2010–11 2011–12 2012–13 2013–14

Season
Rank	Player	Rebounds	Season
1	Spencer Johnson	283	2010–11
2	Carlton Aaron	271	2004–05
3	Anthony Davis	266	1990–91
4	Darecko Rawlins	240	1995–96
5	Darecko Rawlins	236	1994–95
6	Carlton Aaron	222	2002–03
7	Jamar Brown	221	2024–25
8	Fred Chatmon	212	2012–13
9	Mike English	211	2003–04
10	Ron Davis	210	1988–89

Single game
Rank	Player	Rebounds	Season	Opponent
1	Tony Berg	23	1996–97	Baylor
2	Spencer Johnson	21	2010–11	North Dakota State
3	Carlton Aaron	20	2002–03	Youngstown State
4	Darrell Colbert	19	1989–90	Chicago State
5	Spencer Johnson	18	2010–11	Western Illinois
	Jimmy Keller	18	1997–98	UTSA
	Darecko Rawlins	18	1994–95	Buffalo
	Anthony Davis	18	1990–91	U.S. International
9	Jeff Ngandu	17	2022–23	Western Illinois
	Jeff Ngandu	17	2022–23	St. Thomas - Minnesota
	Fred Chatmon	17	2012–13	Houston Baptist
	Carlton Aaron	17	2004–05	Southern Utah
	Mike English	17	2003–04	IUPUI
	Lonnie Alexander	17	1996–97	Texas A&M
	Ron Davis	17	1988–89	South Alabama

== Assists ==
Career
Rank	Player	Assists	Seasons
1	Martez Harrison	393	2013–14 2014–15 2015–16 2016–17
2	Quinton Day	377	2004–05 2005–06 2006–07
3	Kent Denmon	362	1988–89 1989–90 1990–91 1991–92
4	Michael Watson	357	2000–01 2001–02 2002–03 2003–04
5	Tony Dumas	344	1990–91 1991–92 1992–93 1993–94
6	Ronnie Schmitz	297	1989–90 1990–91 1991–92 1992–93
7	Terry Dickerson	294	1990–91 1991–92 1992–93 1994–95
8	Xavier Bishop	292	2016–17 2017–18 2018–19
9	Matt Suther	275	1999–00 2000–01 2001–02
10	Brandon McKissic	251	2017–18 2018–19 2019–20 2020–21

Season
Rank	Player	Assists	Season
1	LaVell Boyd	136	2016–17
2	Quinton Day	131	2006–07
	Khristion Courseault	131	2023–24
4	Quinton Day	130	2005–06
5	Martez Harrison	129	2014–15
6	Martez Harrison	126	2015–16
7	Xavier Bishop	118	2018–19
8	Babacar Diallo	117	2024–25
9	Quinton Day	116	2004–05
10	Martez Harrison	114	2013–14
	CJ Evans	114	2025–26

Single game
Rank	Player	Assists	Season	Opponent
1	Marc Stricker	13	1999–00	Bellevue
2	Khristion Courseault	12	2023–24	Oral Roberts
	Terry Dickerson	12	1992–93	Morehead State
	Baxter Russell	12	1988–89	Alcorn State
5	Sam Martin	11	2020–21	Kansas Christian
	Martez Harrison	11	2015–16	Omaha
	Martez Harrison	11	2014–15	Missouri S&T
8	Khristion Courseault	10	2023–24	South Dakota
	Jahshire Hardnett	10	2019–20	Bacone
	Tim Blackwell	10	2005–06	Chicago State
	Quinton Day	10	2004–05	Wichita State
	Marc Stricker	10	2002–03	Southern Utah
	Tony Dumas	10	1992–93	Chicago State
	Kent Denmon	10	1988–89	Youngstown State
	Reggie DeGrate	10	1988–89	Denver

== Steals ==
Career
Rank	Player	Steals	Seasons
1	Quinton Day	179	2004–05 2005–06 2006–07
2	Michael Watson	173	2000–01 2001–02 2002–03 2003–04
3	Martez Harrison	162	2013–14 2014–15 2015–16 2016–17
4	Ronnie Schmitz	148	1989–90 1990–91 1991–92 1992–93
5	Tony Dumas	142	1990–91 1991–92 1992–93 1993–94
6	Brandon McKissic	129	2017–18 2018–19 2019–20 2020–21
7	Marvin Nesbitt Jr.	127	2017–18 2018–19 2019–20 2020–21 2021–22
8	Michael Jackson	124	1999–00 2000–01 2001–02
9	Darecko Rawlins	121	1992–93 1993–94 1994–95 1995–96
	Erin Washington	121	1994–95 1995–96
	Kent Denmon	121	1988–89 1989–90 1990–91 1991–92

Season
Rank	Player	Steals	Season
1	Quinton Day	76	2005–06
2	Erin Washington	64	1994–95
3	Martez Harrison	60	2014–15
4	Shemarri Allen	59	2022–23
5	Erin Washington	57	1995–96
6	Ronnie Schmitz	55	1992–93
7	Michael Watson	54	2001–02
	Quinton Day	54	2006–07
9	Thomas Staton	52	2011–12
10	Martez Harrison	50	2013–14

Single game
Rank	Player	Steals	Season	Opponent
1	Quinton Day	7	2005–06	Central Methodist
	Erin Washington	7	1995–96	Saint Louis
	Erin Washington	7	1994–95	Nebraska
	Ronnie Schmitz	7	1992–93	Washington U (Mo.)
5	Jamar Brown	6	2023–24	South Dakota
	Shemarri Allen	6	2022–23	North Dakota
	Anderson Kopp	6	2021–22	Spurgeon College
	Marvin Nesbitt Jr.	6	2020–21	Culver-Stockton
	Marvin Nesbitt Jr.	6	2017–18	Haskell
	Nelson Kirksey	6	2013–14	South Dakota St
	Quinton Day	6	2006–07	Central Michigan
	Quinton Day	6	2005–06	Missouri
	Quinton Day	6	2004–05	Western Illinois
	Brandon Temple	6	2003–04	Missouri State
	Randall Atchison	6	2002–03	Oklahoma State
	Erin Washington	6	1994–95	Buffalo
	Tony Dumas	6	1993–94	Colorado
	Ronnie Schmitz	6	1990–91	Denver
	David Robinson	6	1989–90	Rice

== Blocks ==
Career
Rank	Player	Blocks	Seasons
1	Michael Jackson	138	1999–00 2000–01 2001–02
2	David Robinson	126	1987–88 1988–89 1989–90 1990–91 1991–92
3	Darecko Rawlins	99	1992–93 1993–94 1994–95 1995–96
4	Trinity Hall	77	2010–11 2011–12 2012–13 2013–14
5	Brandon Lipsey	73	2002–03 2003–04 2004–05
6	Fred Chatmon	67	2009–10 2011–12 2012–13 2013–14
7	Mike English	66	2003–04 2004–05
8	Jeff Ngandu	65	2022–23 2023–24
9	Thaddeus Smith	64	2014–15 2015–16
10	Marvin Nesbitt Jr.	60	2017–18 2018–19 2019–20 2020–21 2021–22

Season
Rank	Player	Blocks	Season
1	Michael Jackson	51	2000–01
2	Michael Jackson	49	1999–00
3	David Robinson	45	1991–92
4	Thaddeus Smith	44	2014–15
	Jeff Ngandu	44	2022–23
6	David Robinson	39	1988–89
7	Michael Jackson	38	2001–02
	Mike English	38	2004–05
9	Brandon Lipsey	37	2002–03
10	Darecko Rawlins	36	1995–96

Single game
Rank	Player	Blocks	Season	Opponent
1	Thaddeus Smith	7	2014–15	Indiana State
	David Robinson	7	1990–91	Wright State
3	Jeremiah Hartsock	6	2007–08	Eastern Washington
	Brandon Lipsey	6	2002–03	Oral Roberts
5	Babacar Mbengue	5	2025–26	South Dakota
	Jerome Palm	5	2025–26	Weber State
	Jeff Ngandu	5	2022–23	North Dakota State
	Jeff Ngandu	5	2022–23	Denver
	Aleer Leek	5	2017–18	SE Missouri State
	Thaddeus Smith	5	2014–15	CSU Bakersfield
	James Humphrey	5	2008–09	IPFW
	Alex Pledger	5	2006–07	Centenary
	Brandon Lipsey	5	2002–03	Youngstown State
	Michael Jackson	5	2001–02	Green Bay
	Michael Jackson	5	2001–02	Texas AM Corpus Christi
	Michael Jackson	5	2001–02	Youngstown State
	Marcus Golson	5	2001–02	Green Bay
	Michael Jackson	5	2000–01	Western Illinois
	Darecko Rawlins	5	1993–94	Northeastern Illinois
	Darecko Rawlins	5	1993–94	Baylor
	David Robinson	5	1991–92	Tennessee State
	David Robinson	5	1991–92	UT Pan American
	John Davis	5	1991–92	Nicholls State
	John Davis	5	1990–91	Kansas State
	Ron Davis	5	1988–89	Cleveland State
	Ron Davis	5	1988–89	Alcorn State
