= 1991–92 UMKC Kangaroos men's basketball team =

American college basketball season

1991–92 UMKC Kangaroos men's basketball
- Conference: Independent
- Record: 21–7
- Head coach: Lee Hunt (5th season)
- Assistant coach: Mike Nicholson (1st season)
- Home arena: Municipal Auditorium

1991–92 NCAA Division I men's basketball independents standings
	Conf.				Overall
Team	W		L	PCT	W		L	PCT
UMKC	-	–	-	–	21	–	7	.750
Penn State	-	–	-	–	21	–	8	.724
UW-Milwaukee	-	–	-	–	20	–	8	.714
Southern Utah	-	–	-	–	20	–	8	.714
College of Charleston	-	–	-	–	19	–	8	.704
Notre Dame	-	–	-	–	18	–	15	.545
Cal State Northridge	-	–	-	–	11	–	17	.393
Northeastern Illinois	-	–	-	–	8	–	20	.286
Chicago State	-	–	-	–	7	–	21	.250
UNC Greensboro	-	–	-	–	7	–	21	.250
Youngstown State	-	–	-	–	6	–	22	.214
Sacramento State	-	–	-	–	4	–	24	.143
Rankings from AP Poll

The 1991–92 UMKC Kangaroos men's basketball team represented the University of Missouri–Kansas City during the 1991–92 NCAA Division I men's basketball season. The Kangaroos played their home games off-campus at Municipal Auditorium in Kansas City, Missouri as an independent.

== Previous season ==
The Kangaroos finished the 1990–91 season with a record of 15–14.

== Roster ==
1991–92 UMKC Kangaroos men's basketball team
Players
Coaches

Pos.	#	Name	Height	Weight	Year	Previous school	Hometown
C	45	David Robinson	6 ft 10 in (2.08 m)	230 lb (104 kg)	RS Sr	Joplin HS	Joplin, MO
F	53	Anthony Davis	6 ft 9 in (2.06 m)	—	Sr	Seminole State; F. L. Schlagle HS	Kansas City, KS
C	22	John Davis	7 ft 1 in (2.16 m)	—	Sr	Northland Community & Technical
G	11	Kent Denmon	6 ft 3 in (1.91 m)	—	Sr	Hickman Mills HS	Kansas City, MO
G	40	Mark Echols (redshirt)	6 ft 5 in (1.96 m)	—	Jr	Gosnell HS
G	24	Ronnie Schmitz	6 ft 4 in (1.93 m)	—	Jr	Ridgeway HS	Memphis, TN
F	55	Mike Schroer	6 ft 8 in (2.03 m)	—	Jr
F	33	Joe Seabrooks	6 ft 6 in (1.98 m)	—	RS So		Atlanta, GA
G	13	Terry Dickerson	6 ft 2 in (1.88 m)	—	So	Fayette–Ware HS	Somerville, TN
G	23	Tony Dumas	6 ft 6 in (1.98 m)	—	So	Millington Central HS	Millington, TN
F	32	Ernesto Michel	6 ft 8 in (2.03 m)	—	So
F	41	Jeff Spiva	6 ft 8 in (2.03 m)	—	So
C	42	Rick Muller	6 ft 10 in (2.08 m)	225 lb (102 kg)	Fr		Kansas City, MO
G	20	Travis Salmon	6 ft 5 in (1.96 m)	200 lb (91 kg)	Fr		Creighton, MO

Head coach

- Lee Hunt (Central Missouri State)

Assistant coach(es)

- Mike Nicholson (Missouri)

Legend

- (C) Team captain
- (S) Suspended
- (I) Ineligible
- (W) Walk-on
- (5Y) Fifth-year Senior
- Injured
- Current redshirt

Roster
Last update: November 3, 2024

== Schedule & Results ==
Date time, TV	Rank^{#}	Opponent^{#}	Result	Record	High points	High rebounds	High assists	Site (attendance) city, state
Exhibition Season
November 6, 1991*		Spirit Express	W 95–86		31 – Robinson	9 – Dickerson	4 – Dickerson, Dumas	Municipal Auditorium (273); Kansas City, MO
November 9, 1991*		Lithuania Select	W 102–89		37 – Dumas	12 – Dumas	5 – Denmon, Dickerson	Municipal Auditorium (881); Kansas City, MO
Regular Season
November 25, 1991*		Biola	W 68–65	1–0	34 – Dumas	8 – Robinson	4 – Denmon	Municipal Auditorium (2,068); Kansas City, MO
November 29, 1991*		vs. Nicholls State; River City Classic [Semifinal]	W 88–58	2–0	36 – Dumas	5 – Robinson, Schmitz, Dickerson	4 – Denmon	Show Me Center (1,933); Cape Girardeau, MO
November 30, 1991*		vs. Cleveland State; River City Classic [Final]	W 73–67	3–0	22 – Robinson	11 – A.Davis	4 – Spiva	Show Me Center (5,089); Cape Girardeau, MO
December 4, 1991*		Texas–Pan American	W 92–80	4–0	29 – Robinson	9 – A.Davis	6 – Schmitz	Municipal Auditorium (2,271); Kansas City, MO
December 11, 1991*		at Southwest Missouri State	L 64–77	4–1	33 – Dumas	8 – A.Davis	4 – Denmon	John Q. Hammons; Student Center (8,314); Springfield, MO
December 14, 1991*		Mississippi Valley State	W 84–68	5–1	22 – Dumas	11 – Robinson	5 – Denmon	Municipal Auditorium (1,311); Kansas City, MO
December 16, 1991*		Cincinnati	L 61–65	5–2	21 – Schmitz	8 – A.Davis, Robinson	6 – Denmon	Municipal Auditorium (3,979); Kansas City, MO
December 18, 1991*		Jackson State	W 86–74	6–2	21 – Schmitz	8 – Denmon, Michel	7 – Schmitz	Municipal Auditorium (1,748); Kansas City, MO
December 21, 1991*		at Texas–Pan American; FORFEIT (Result L 55–56)	W 2–0	7–2	12 – Schmitz	7 – Spiva	5 – Dickerson	UTPA Fieldhouse (753); Edinburg, TX
December 30, 1991*		at Texas A&M	W 85–79 ^{OT}	8–2	29 – Dumas	7 – Robinson	4 – Dickerson	G. Rollie White Coliseum (1,368); College Station, TX
January 4, 1992*		Wisconsin–Milwaukee	W 82–74	9–2	26 – Dumas	14 – Robinson	3 – Dumas	Municipal Auditorium (2,781); Kansas City, MO
January 6, 1992*; 6:00 PM		Western Illinois	W 77–46	10–2	18 – Dumas	7 – Michel	5 – Dickerson	Municipal Auditorium (1,509); Kansas City, MO
January 9, 1992*		Southern California College	W 116–78	11–2	33 – Robinson	8 – Robinson	6 – Schmitz, Dickerson	Municipal Auditorium (2,209); Kansas City, MO
January 11, 1992*; 7:35 PM		at Oklahoma State	L 58–86	11–3	19 – Robinson, Dumas	6 – Dumas	5 – Dickerson	Gallagher-Iba Arena (6,381); Stillwater, OK
January 16, 1992*		at Jackson State	L 66–76	11–4	22 – Dumas	6 – Spiva	5 – Dumas	Lee E. Williams; Athletics and Assembly Center (1,000); Jackson, MS
January 20, 1992*		at Nebraska	L 71–74	11–5	21 – Dumas	7 – Michel	6 – Denmon	Bob Devaney Sports Center (10,702); Lincoln, NE
January 25, 1992*		at Wisconsin–Milwaukee	W 81–58	12–5	27 – Robinson	10 – Michel	7 – Denmon	J. Martin Klotsche Center (2,781); Milwaukee, WI
January 29, 1992*		at Kansas State	L 53–72	12–6	21 – Dumas	7 – Michel	2 – Schmitz, Spiva	Fred Bramlage Coliseum (10,327); Manhattan, KS
February 1, 1992*		Baylor	W 75–61	13–6	24 – Robinson	5 – Robinson	4 – Schmitz	Municipal Auditorium (4,932); Kansas City, MO
February 3, 1992*		Tennessee State	W 74–56	14–6	21 – Robinson	9 – Robinson	7 – Dumas	Municipal Auditorium (1,894); Kansas City, MO
February 5, 1992*		Colorado–Colorado Springs	W 97–47	15–6	23 – Schmitz	7 – Robinson	5 – Dickerson	Municipal Auditorium (1,412); Kansas City, MO
February 10, 1992*		Creighton	W 79–68	16–6	31 – Robinson	8 – Robinson	4 – Denmon, Dumas	Municipal Auditorium (3,797); Kansas City, MO
February 13, 1992*; 7:30 PM		at Western Illinois	L 70–91	16–7	29 – Robinson	11 – Robinson	4 – Schmitz	Western Hall (773); Macomb, IL
February 17, 1991*		at Chicago State	W 88–74	17–7	32 – Dumas	7 – Robinson	4 – Schmitz	CSU Athletics Building (200); Chicago, IL
February 22, 1992*		Texas A&M	W 63–46	18–7	28 – Dumas	6 – Denmon, Spiva	3 – Robinson	Municipal Auditorium (4,409); Kansas City, MO
February 24, 1992*		Chicago State	W 107–57	19–7	31 – Robinson	6 – Schmitz	6 – Dumas	Municipal Auditorium (2,638); Kansas City, MO
March 1, 1992*; 2:00 PM		Northeastern Illinois	W 82–68	20–7	21 – Robinson	10 – A.Davis	6 – Denmon	Municipal Auditorium (2,290); Kansas City, MO
March 4, 1992*; 7:00 PM		at Northeastern Illinois	W 77–66	21–7	22 – Dumas	7 – Denmon	4 – Dickerson, Spiva	Physical Education Complex (284); Chicago, IL
*Non-conference game. ^{#}Rankings from AP Poll. (#) Tournament seedings in parentheses. All times are in Central Standard Time (CST).

Source
NOTE: the National Collegiate Athletic Association forfeited the defeat of December 21, resulting in one less loss and one more win being reflected in the official overall record for those games.
