= 1992–93 UMKC Kangaroos men's basketball team =

American college basketball season

1992–93 UMKC Kangaroos men's basketball
- Conference: Independent
- Record: 15–12
- Head coach: Lee Hunt (6th season)
- Assistant coach: Mike Nicholson (2nd season)
- Home arena: Municipal Auditorium

1992–93 NCAA Division I men's basketball independents standings
	Conf.				Overall
Team	W		L	PCT	W		L	PCT
UW-Milwaukee	-	–	-	–	23	–	4	.852
UMKC	-	–	-	–	15	–	12	.556
Southern Utah	-	–	-	–	14	–	13	.519
Northeastern Illinois	-	–	-	–	11	–	16	.407
Cal State Northridge	-	–	-	–	10	–	17	.370
Hofstra	-	–	-	–	9	–	18	.333
Notre Dame	-	–	-	–	9	–	18	.333
Central Connecticut State	-	–	-	–	8	–	19	.296
Buffalo	-	–	-	–	5	–	22	.185
Chicago State	-	–	-	–	4	–	23	.148
Sacramento State	-	–	-	–	3	–	24	.111
Rankings from AP Poll

The 1992–93 UMKC Kangaroos men's basketball team represented the University of Missouri–Kansas City during the 1992–93 NCAA Division I men's basketball season. The Kangaroos played their home games off-campus at Municipal Auditorium in Kansas City, Missouri as an independent.

== Previous season ==
The Kangaroos finished the 1991–92 season with a record of 21–7.

== Roster ==
1992–93 UMKC Kangaroos men's basketball team
Players
Coaches

Pos.	#	Name	Height	Weight	Year	Previous school	Hometown
G	24	Ronnie Schmitz	6 ft 4 in (1.93 m)	—	Sr	Ridgeway HS	Memphis, TN
F	33	Joe Seabrooks	6 ft 6 in (1.98 m)	—	RS Jr		Atlanta, GA
G	22	Shawn Brown	5 ft 11 in (1.8 m)	—	Jr
G	13	Terry Dickerson	6 ft 2 in (1.88 m)	—	Jr	Fayette–Ware HS	Somerville, TN
G	23	Tony Dumas	6 ft 6 in (1.98 m)	—	Jr	Millington Central HS	Millington, TN
C	44	Dennis Jacobs	6 ft 11 in (2.11 m)	—	Jr
F	34	Eric Lytle	6 ft 6 in (1.98 m)	—	Jr
F	41	Jeff Spiva	6 ft 8 in (2.03 m)	—	Jr
C	42	Rick Muller	6 ft 10 in (2.08 m)	225 lb (102 kg)	So		Kansas City, MO
G	20	Travis Salmon	6 ft 5 in (1.96 m)	200 lb (91 kg)	So		Creighton, MO
G	21	Curtis Barnes	5 ft 10 in (1.78 m)	170 lb (77 kg)	Fr		Grandview, MO
G	25	Darecko Rawlins	6 ft 5 in (1.96 m)	185 lb (84 kg)	Fr	Millington Central HS	Memphis, TN

Head coach

- Lee Hunt (Central Missouri State)

Assistant coach(es)

- Mike Nicholson (Missouri)

Legend

- (C) Team captain
- (S) Suspended
- (I) Ineligible
- (W) Walk-on
- (5Y) Fifth-year Senior
- Injured
- Current redshirt

Roster
Last update: November 3, 2024

== Schedule & Results ==
Date time, TV	Rank^{#}	Opponent^{#}	Result	Record	High points	High rebounds	High assists	Site (attendance) city, state
Regular Season
December 1, 1992*		Southwest Missouri State	L 44–47	0–1	21 – Dumas	8 – Dumas; Spiva	3 – Dickerson	Municipal Auditorium (4,259); Kansas City, MO
December 5, 1992*		at Wichita State	L 56–63	0–2	18 – Dumas	6 – Dumas	8 – Dickerson	Levitt Arena (6,549); Wichita, KS
December 8, 1992*		Texas Wesleyan	W 97–61	1–2	38 – Dumas	9 – Muller	8 – Dumas	Municipal Auditorium (1,409); Kansas City, MO
December 11, 1992*		vs. California–Irvine; Golden Harvest Classic [Semifinal]	W 86–85	2–2	32 – Dumas	9 – Lytle	6 – Dickerson	Kemper Arena (11,879); Kansas City, MO
December 12, 1992*		vs. No. 2 Kansas; Golden Harvest Classic [Final]	L 62–108	2–3	22 – Dumas	5 – Dumas, Lytle, Muller	4 – Dumas	Kemper Arena (12,403); Kansas City, MO
December 18, 1992*		Kansas State	L 64–66	2–4	19 – Dumas	7 – Jacobs	4 – Dumas	Municipal Auditorium (5,498); Kansas City, MO
December 21, 1992*		Florida Institute of Technology	W 68–55	3–4	22 – Dumas	11 – Robinson	5 – Denmon	Municipal Auditorium (1,311); Kansas City, MO
December 23, 1992*		Morehead State	W 115–79	4–4	37 – Schmitz	9 – Lytle	12 – Dickerson	Municipal Auditorium; Kansas City, MO
December 30, 1992*		at Baylor	L 87–98	4–5	32 – Dumas	12 – Spiva	4 – Dickerson	Paul J. Meyer Arena (2,987); Waco, TX
January 2, 1993*		Colorado	W 63–59	5–5	22 – Schmitz	6 – Muller	4 – Dumas	Municipal Auditorium (2,481); Kansas City, MO
January 4, 1993*		Middle Tennessee State	W 73–65	6–5	22 – Dumas	10 – Dumas	4 – Dumas, Spiva	Municipal Auditorium (1,538); Kansas City, MO
January 6, 1993*		at Mississippi Valley State	L 69–85	6–6	21 – Dumas	9 – Spiva	7 – Dickerson	R. W. Harrison Complex (300); Itta Bena, MS
January 9, 1993*		Nebraska	L 65–66	6–7	23 – Schmitz, Dumas	6 – Dumas	5 – Dickerson	Municipal Auditorium (5,044); Kansas City, MO
January 11, 1993*		Washington–St. Louis	W 101–62	7–7	21 – Schmitz	11 – Jacobs	5 – Dickerson, Spiva	Municipal Auditorium (772); Kansas City, MO
January 16, 1993*		Chicago State	W 106–76	8–7	21 – Schmitz	8 – Schmitz	10 – Dumas	Municipal Auditorium (2,413); Kansas City, MO
January 20, 1993*		at Colorado	L 66–88	8–8	32 – Dumas	6 – Dumas, Spiva	3 – Schmitz, Spiva	Coors Events/Conference Center (3,298); Boulder, CO
January 23, 1993*		at Tennessee State	L 71–84	8–9	22 – Dumas	7 – Jacobs	6 – Schmitz, Dickerson	Gentry Complex (5,223); Nashville, TN
January 27, 1993*		at Wisconsin–Milwaukee	L 57–73	8–10	12 – Schmitz, Dumas, Jacobs, Spiva	10 – Spiva	4 – Dumas	Milwaukee Exposition, Convention Center and Arena (3,018); Milwaukee, WI
January 30, 1993*		at Morehead State	W 83–75	9–10	28 – Dumas	7 – Dickerson	6 – Dickerson	Ellis T. Johnson Arena (1,800); Morehead, KY
February 1, 1993*		Wisconsin–Milwaukee	W 99–77	10–10	30 – Dumas	10 – Spiva	8 – Schmitz	Municipal Auditorium (1,688); Kansas City, MO
February 6, 1993*; 1:05 PM		at Saint Louis	L 70–78	10–11	28 – Dumas	4 – Lytle, Spiva	5 – Dickerson, Dumas	The Arena (8,479); St. Louis, MO
February 8, 1993*		at Creighton	L 79–88	10–12	27 – Dumas	5 – Dumas, Lytle	6 – Schmitz	Omaha Civic Auditorium (2,276); Omaha, NE
February 13, 1993*		at Chicago State	W 83–69	11–12	20 – Muller	10 – Spiva	4 – Dickerson	CSU Athletics Building; Chicago, IL
February 15, 1993*		Grand View	W 99–78	12–12	29 – Schmitz	9 – Jacobs	4 – Schmitz	Municipal Auditorium (1,009); Kansas City, MO
February 18, 1993*; 7:00 PM		at Northeastern Illinois	W 94–64	13–12	33 – Dumas	9 – Muller	6 – Schmitz	Physical Education Complex (179); Chicago, IL
February 23, 1993*		Mississippi State	W 89–87 ^{OT}	14–12	27 – Dumas	8 – Dumas, Spiva	8 – Schmitz	Municipal Auditorium (3,483); Kansas City, MO
February 27, 1993*; 7:30 PM		Northeastern Illinois	W 96–80	15–12	28 – Schmitz	6 – Salmon	4 – Dickerson, Salmon	Municipal Auditorium (3,012); Kansas City, MO
*Non-conference game. ^{#}Rankings from AP Poll. (#) Tournament seedings in parentheses. All times are in Central Standard Time (CST).
