= 1993–94 UMKC Kangaroos men's basketball team =

American college basketball season

1993–94 UMKC Kangaroos men's basketball
- Conference: Independent
- Record: 12–17
- Head coach: Lee Hunt (7th season)
- Assistant coach: Nike Nicholson (3rd season)
- Home arena: Municipal Auditorium

1993–94 NCAA Division I men's basketball independents standings
	Conf.				Overall
Team	W		L	PCT	W		L	PCT
Southern Utah	-	–	-	–	16	–	11	.593
UMKC	-	–	-	–	12	–	17	.414
Notre Dame	-	–	-	–	12	–	17	.414
Cal State Northridge	-	–	-	–	8	–	18	.308
Oral Roberts	-	–	-	–	6	–	21	.222
Sacramento State	-	–	-	–	1	–	26	.037
Rankings from AP Poll

The 1993–94 UMKC Kangaroos men's basketball team represented the University of Missouri–Kansas City during the 1993–94 NCAA Division I men's basketball season. The Kangaroos played their home games off-campus at Municipal Auditorium in Kansas City, Missouri as an independent.

== Previous season ==
The Kangaroos finished the 1992–93 season with a record of 15–12.

== Roster ==
1993–94 UMKC Kangaroos men's basketball team
Players
Coaches

Pos.	#	Name	Height	Weight	Year	Previous school	Hometown
F	33	Joe Seabrooks	6 ft 6 in (1.98 m)	—	RS Sr		Atlanta, GA
G	13	Terry Dickerson (injured) (redshirt)	6 ft 2 in (1.88 m)	—	Sr	Fayette–Ware HS	Somerville, TN
G	23	Tony Dumas	6 ft 6 in (1.98 m)	—	Sr	Millington Central HS	Millington, TN
C	44	Dennis Jacobs	6 ft 11 in (2.11 m)	—	Sr
C	42	Rick Muller	6 ft 10 in (2.08 m)	225 lb (102 kg)	Jr		Kansas City, MO
G	22	Craig Ruble	6 ft 0 in (1.83 m)	—	Jr
G	20	Travis Salmon	6 ft 5 in (1.96 m)	200 lb (91 kg)	Jr		Creighton, MO
G	21	Curtis Barnes	5 ft 10 in (1.78 m)	170 lb (77 kg)	So		Grandview, MO
G	30	Erich Harris	6 ft 1 in (1.85 m)	—	So
G	25	Darecko Rawlins	6 ft 5 in (1.96 m)	185 lb (84 kg)	So	Millington Central HS	Memphis, TN
G	32	Vinson Smith	6 ft 3 in (1.91 m)	—	So	Youngstown State; F. L. Schlagle HS	Kansas City, KS
C	45	Tony Berg	6 ft 9 in (2.06 m)	215 lb (98 kg)	Fr		Colorado Springs, CO
F	41	Anthony Hill (redshirt)	6 ft 8 in (2.03 m)	—	Fr

Head coach

- Lee Hunt (Central Missouri State)

Assistant coach(es)

- Mike Nicholson (Missouri)

Legend

- (C) Team captain
- (S) Suspended
- (I) Ineligible
- (W) Walk-on
- (5Y) Fifth-year Senior
- Injured
- Current redshirt

Roster
Last update: November 3, 2024

== Schedule & Results ==
Date time, TV	Rank^{#}	Opponent^{#}	Result	Record	High points	High rebounds	High assists	Site (attendance) city, state
Regular Season
November 27, 1993*		at Southwest Missouri State	L 62–75	0–1	22 – Dumas	6 – Dumas	3 – Dumas	John Q. Hammons; Student Center (7,959); Springfield, MO
November 29, 1993*		Creighton	W 82–57	1–1	26 – Dumas	14 – Berg	6 – Dumas	Municipal Auditorium (2,694); Kansas City, MO
December 3, 1993*		vs. Northeast Louisiana; KYLT Coca–Cola Classic [Semifinal]	W 94–83	2–1	23 – Jacobs	6 – Dumas, Jacobs, Muller	8 – Salmon	Harry Adams Field House (5,557); Missoula, MT
December 4, 1993*		at Montana; KYLT Coca–Cola Classic [Final]	L 72–97	2–2	23 – Dumas	7 – Jacobs, Berg	5 – Smith	Harry Adams Field House (6,138); Missoula, MT
December 6, 1993*; 7:30 PM		Southwest Texas State	L 54–55	2–3	18 – Dumas	13 – Dumas	5 – Dumas	Municipal Auditorium (2,074); Kansas City, MO
December 10, 1993*		at Hawai'i; United Airlines Tip–Off Tournament [Semifinal]	L 54–72	2–4	25 – Dumas	5 – Dumas, Salmon, Rawlins, Berg	3 – Dumas	Neal S. Blaisdell Arena (3,289); Honolulu, HI
December 11, 1993*		vs. Tennessee State; United Airlines Tip–Off Tournament [Consolation Final]	L 55–75	2–5	13 – Dumas, Salmon	7 – Berg	2 – Rawlins	Neal S. Blaisdell Arena (2,981); Honolulu, HI
December 18, 1993*		at Middle Tennessee State	L 67–82	2–6	17 – Dumas	12 – Berg	3 – Salmon	Monte Hale Arena (2,200); Murfreesboro, TN
December 22, 1993*		Kansas State	L 66–70	2–7	21 – Dumas	6 – Muller	4 – Salmon	Municipal Auditorium (8,215); Kansas City, MO
December 28, 1993*		Baylor	W 74–71	3–7	21 – Dumas	7 – Salmon	5 – Smith	Municipal Auditorium (2,922); Kansas City, MO
December 31, 1993*		Southern California	L 66–67	3–8	19 – Dumas	8 – Muller	4 – Dumas, Salmon, Smith	Municipal Auditorium (3,191); Kansas City, MO
January 4, 1994*		Wichita State	W 68–48	4–8	27 – Dumas	11 – Rawlins	5 – Smith	Municipal Auditorium (5,248); Kansas City, MO
January 6, 1994*		Montana	L 54–55	4–9	22 – Dumas	8 – Dumas	2 – Dumas, Smith	Municipal Auditorium (1,805); Kansas City, MO
January 8, 1994*		Texas Tech	W 78–70	5–9	44 – Dumas	12 – Dumas	4 – Salmon	Municipal Auditorium (2,705); Kansas City, MO
January 12, 1994*		at Colorado	L 76–84	5–10	43 – Dumas	7 – Muller	5 – Dumas	Coors Events/Conference Center (2,232); Boulder, CO
January 15, 1994*		at Nebraska	L 71–92	5–11	26 – Jacobs	11 – Jacobs	3 – Dumas, Salmon, Smith	Bob Devaney Sports Center (14,358); Lincoln, NE
January 22, 1994*		at Chicago State	W 84–81	6–11	34 – Dumas	12 – Rawlins	5 – Seabrooks	Jacoby D. Dickens Physical; Education and Athletics Center (291); Chicago, IL
January 25, 1994*		at Texas Tech	L 69–96	6–12	32 – Dumas	6 – Rawlins	5 – Smith	Lubbock Municipal Coliseum (5,780); Lubbock, TX
January 29, 1994*; 7:30 PM		Saint Louis	L 71–83	6–13	28 – Dumas	6 – Dumas	5 – Smith	Municipal Auditorium (6,348); Kansas City, MO
February 2, 1994*; 7:00 PM		at Mississippi State	L 61–83	6–14	27 – Dumas	10 – Dumas	4 – Smith	Humphrey Coliseum (3,636); Starkville, MS
February 5, 1994*		at Northeastern Illinois	W 86–85	7–14	35 – Dumas	11 – Salmon	4 – Dumas	Physical Education Complex (1,042); Chicago, IL
February 7, 1994*		Chicago State	W 95–85	8–14	18 – Jacobs	8 – Dumas	6 – Salmon	Municipal Auditorium (1,781); Kansas City, MO
February 9, 1994*		Washington–St. Louis	W 81–75	9–14	31 – Dumas	11 – Barnes	6 – Barnes	Municipal Auditorium (1,888); Kansas City, MO
February 12, 1994*		Oral Roberts	W 73–69	10–14	28 – Dumas	12 – Muller	5 – Barnes, Smith	Municipal Auditorium (2,208); Kansas City, MO
February 14, 1994*; 7:35 PM		at Southwest Texas State	L 58–78	10–15	27 – Dumas	4 – Salmon, Smith	5 – Dumas	Strahan Coliseum (1,234); San Marcos, TX
February 16, 1994*		Northeastern Illinois	W 90–79	11–15	40 – Dumas	13 – Rawlins	6 – Dumas	Municipal Auditorium (1,997); Kansas City, MO
February 19, 1994*		Southern Utah	W 77–68	12–15	23 – Dumas	10 – Jacobs	4 – Dumas	Municipal Auditorium (3,882); Kansas City, MO
February 22, 1994*		at Kansas State	L 58–71	12–16	29 – Dumas	10 – Muller	2 – Muller, Smith	Fred Bramlage Coliseum (9,424); Manhattan, KS
March 5, 1994*		at Southern Utah	L 79–82	12–17	23 – Dumas	8 – Jacobs, Rawlins	7 – Smith	Centrum Arena (4,066); Cedar City, UT
*Non-conference game. ^{#}Rankings from AP Poll. (#) Tournament seedings in parentheses. All times are in Central Standard Time (CST).
