= 1994–95 UMKC Kangaroos men's basketball team =

American college basketball season

1994–95 UMKC Kangaroos men's basketball
- Conference: Mid–Continent Conference
- Record: 7–19 (7–11 Mid–Con)
- Head coach: Lee Hunt (8th season)
- Assistant coach: Mike Nicholson (4th season)
- Home arena: Municipal Auditorium

1994–95 Mid-Continent Conference men's basketball standings
	Conf.				Overall
Team	W		L	PCT	W		L	PCT
Valparaiso †	14	–	4	.778	20	–	8	.714
Western Illinois	13	–	5	.722	20	–	8	.714
Buffalo	12	–	6	.667	18	–	10	.643
Youngstown State	10	–	8	.556	18	–	10	.643
Troy State	10	–	8	.556	11	–	16	.407
Eastern Illinois	10	–	8	.556	16	–	13	.552
Missouri–Kansas City	7	–	11	.389	7	–	19	.269
Central Connecticut State	6	–	12	.333	8	–	18	.308
Chicago State	6	–	12	.333	6	–	20	.231
Northeastern Illinois	2	–	16	.111	4	–	22	.154
† 1995 Mid-Con Tournament winner Rankings from AP Poll

The 1994–95 UMKC Kangaroos men's basketball team represented the University of Missouri–Kansas City during the 1994–95 NCAA Division I men's basketball season. The Kangaroos played their home games off-campus at Municipal Auditorium in Kansas City, Missouri as a member of the Mid–Continent Conference.

== Previous season ==
The Kangaroos finished the 1993–94 season with a record of 12–17.

== Roster ==
1994–95 UMKC Kangaroos men's basketball team
Players
Coaches

Pos.	#	Name	Height	Weight	Year	Previous school	Hometown
G	13	Terry Dickerson	6 ft 2 in (1.88 m)	—	RS Sr	Fayette–Ware HS	Somerville, TN
C	42	Rick Muller (injured) (redshirt)	6 ft 10 in (2.08 m)	225 lb (102 kg)	Sr		Kansas City, MO
G	22	Craig Ruble	6 ft 0 in (1.83 m)	—	Sr	De Soto HS	De Soto, MO
G	20	Travis Salmon (injured) (redshirt)	6 ft 5 in (1.96 m)	200 lb (91 kg)	Sr		Creighton, MO
G	21	Curtis Barnes	5 ft 10 in (1.78 m)	170 lb (77 kg)	Jr		Grandview, MO
C	44	Greg Gerhant	6 ft 9 in (2.06 m)	245 lb (111 kg)	Jr		Lublin, Poland
F	5	Chris Haynes	6 ft 5 in (1.96 m)	195 lb (88 kg)	Jr		Memphis, TN
F	33	Chris Johnson	6 ft 6 in (1.98 m)	230 lb (104 kg)	Jr		Boulder, CO
G	25	Darecko Rawlins	6 ft 5 in (1.96 m)	185 lb (84 kg)	Jr	Millington Central HS	Memphis, TN
G	32	Vinson Smith (injured) (redshirt)	6 ft 3 in (1.91 m)	—	Jr	Youngstown State; F. L. Schlagle HS	Kansas City, KS
G	4	Erin Washington	5 ft 10 in (1.78 m)	160 lb (73 kg)	Jr		Mesquite, TX
C	45	Tony Berg (injured) (redshirt)	6 ft 9 in (2.06 m)	215 lb (98 kg)	So		Colorado Springs, CO
G	35	Brandon Klaus	6 ft 4 in (1.93 m)	—	So
G	10	Terence Jackson	6 ft 2 in (1.88 m)	—	Fr

Head coach

- Lee Hunt (Central Missouri State)

Assistant coach(es)

- Mike Nicholson (Missouri)

Legend

- (C) Team captain
- (S) Suspended
- (I) Ineligible
- (W) Walk-on
- (5Y) Fifth-year Senior
- Injured
- Current redshirt

Roster
Last update: November 3, 2024

== Schedule & Results ==
Date time, TV	Rank^{#}	Opponent^{#}	Result	Record	High points	High rebounds	High assists	Site (attendance) city, state
Exhibition Season
November 18, 1994*; 7:30 PM		Angolian National Team						Municipal Auditorium; Kansas City, MO
December 10, 1994*; 7:30 PM		MNS Stars (AAU)						Municipal Auditorium; Kansas City, MO
Regular Season
November 26, 1994*; 7:30 PM		Southwest Missouri State	L 57–70	0–1	11 – Johnson	6 – Johnson, Rawlins	3 – Haynes	Municipal Auditorium (3,282); Kansas City, MO
November 29, 1994; 7:30 PM		Buffalo	L 67–68	0–2 (0–1)	15 – Dickerson, Berg	11 – Berg	5 – Dickerson	Municipal Auditorium (2,012); Kansas City, MO
December 2, 1994*; 7:00 PM		at Kansas State	L 48–80	0–3	13 – Washington	9 – Berg	4 – Dickerson	Fred Bramlage Coliseum (8,523); Manhattan, KS
December 7, 1994*; 7:05 PM		at Saint Louis	L 68–95	0–4	17 – Rawlins	6 – Johnson	3 – Dickerson	Kiel Center (12,752); St. Louis, MO
December 17, 1994*; 2:05 PM		at Creighton	L 61–75	0–5	15 – Rawlins	6 – Johnson	5 – Washington	Omaha Civic Auditorium (4,332); Omaha, NE
December 20, 1994*; 7:00 PM		at Southern California	L 74–82	0–6	20 – Johnson	9 – Johnson	5 – Washington	Los Angeles Memorial; Sports Arena (2,106); Los Angeles, CA
January 3, 1995; 7:30 PM		Eastern Illinois	L 57–65	0–7 (0–2)	18 – Johnson	13 – Johnson	3 – Dickerson	Municipal Auditorium (1,912); Kansas City, MO
January 5, 1995; 7:30 PM		Valparaiso	W 72–60	1–7 (1–2)	19 – Rawlins	16 – Rawlins	3 – Washington	Municipal Auditorium (2,456); Kansas City, MO
January 7, 1995; 7:30 PM		at Western Illinois	L 74–79	1–8 (1–3)	19 – Barnes	13 – Rawlins	8 – Washington	Western Hall (2,699); Macomb, IL
January 11, 1995*; 7:30 PM		Colorado	L 92–100	1–9	30 – Washington	11 – Johnson, Rawlins	4 – Rawlins, Washington	Municipal Auditorium (5,721); Kansas City, MO
January 14, 1995; 7:30 PM		at Chicago State	W 89–73	2–9 (2–3)	19 – Washington	9 – Rawlins	9 – Washington	Jacoby D. Dickens Physical; Education and Athletics Center (1,033); Chicago, IL
January 16, 1995; 7:30 PM		at Northeastern Illinois	W 68–60	3–9 (3–3)	23 – Washington	11 – Rawlins	4 – Washington	Physical Education Complex (320); Chicago, IL
January 18, 1995*; 7:30 PM		Nebraska	L 60–63	3–10	13 – Johnson, Washington	6 – Rawlins	2 – Dickerson, Barnes, Washington, Klaus	Municipal Auditorium (5,356); Kansas City, MO
January 21, 1995; 7:15 PM		at Buffalo	L 68–77	3–11 (3–4)	23 – Rawlins	18 – Rawlins	2 – Washington	Alumni Arena (2,461); Amherst, NY
January 23, 1995; 6:30 PM		at Youngstown State	L 52–67	3–12 (3–5)	20 – Haynes	9 – Haynes	4 – Klaus	Beeghly Physical Education Center (2,110); Youngstown, OH
January 28, 1995; 7:30 PM		Central Connecticut State	W 77–69	4–12 (4–5)	27 – Rawlins	15 – Johnson	4 – Washington	Municipal Auditorium (2,497); Kansas City, MO
January 30, 1995; 7:30 PM		Troy State	L 93–94	4–13 (4–6)	35 – Rawlins	12 – Rawlins	6 – Haynes	Municipal Auditorium (1,998); Kansas City, MO
February 1, 1995*; 7:35 PM		at Baylor	L 89–92	4–14	21 – Haynes	9 – Rawlins	5 – Washington	Ferrell Center (2,079); Waco, TX
February 4, 1995; 7:30 PM		at Valparaiso	L 57–78	4–15 (4–7)	20 – Rawlins	6 – Haynes, Johnson	4 – Dickerson	Athletics–Recreation Center (4,357); Valparaiso, IN
February 6, 1995; 7:35 PM		at Eastern Illinois	L 63–76	4–16 (4–8)	22 – Washington	6 – Rawlins	2 – Rawlins, Washington	Lantz Arena (1,931); Charleston, IL
February 11, 1995; 7:30 PM		Western Illinois	L 69–71	4–17 (4–9)	21 – Rawlins	13 – Gerhant, Rawlins	4 – Rawlins	Municipal Auditorium (2,730); Kansas City, MO
February 18, 1995; 7:30 PM		Northeastern Illinois	W 78–77	5–17 (5–9)	31 – Rawlins	6 – Barnes	4 – Haynes	Municipal Auditorium (3,474); Kansas City, MO
February 20, 1995; 7:30 PM		Chicago State	W 91–64	6–17 (6–9)	23 – Rawlins	11 – Gerhant	7 – Washington	Municipal Auditorium (1,798); Kansas City, MO
February 23, 1995; 7:30 PM		Youngstown State	L 63–69	6–18 (6–10)	15 – Rawlins, Washington	5 – Rawlins, Washington	4 – Washington	Municipal Auditorium (1,995); Kansas City, MO
February 27, 1995; 7:30 PM		at Troy State	L 58–77	6–19 (6–11)	16 – Dickerson	15 – Rawlins	4 – Dickerson	Sartain Hall (1,000); Troy, AL
March 1, 1995; 6:30 PM		at Central Connecticut State	W 74–68	7–19 (7–11)	17 – Rawlins	10 – Rawlins	5 – Dickerson	William H. Detrick Gymnasium (455); New Britain, CT
*Non-conference game. ^{#}Rankings from AP Poll. (#) Tournament seedings in parentheses. All times are in Central Standard Time (CST).
