= 1995–96 UMKC Kangaroos men's basketball team =

American college basketball season

1995–96 UMKC Kangaroos men's basketball
- Conference: Mid–Continent Conference
- Record: 12–15 (10–8 Mid–Con)
- Head coach: Lee Hunt (9th season)
- Assistant coach: Mike Nicholson (5th season)
- Home arena: Municipal Auditorium

1995–96 Mid-Continent Conference men's basketball standings
	Conf.				Overall
Team	W		L	PCT	W		L	PCT
Valparaiso †	13	–	5	.722	21	–	11	.656
Western Illinois	12	–	6	.667	17	–	12	.586
Missouri–Kansas City	10	–	8	.556	12	–	15	.444
Buffalo	10	–	8	.556	13	–	14	.481
Northeastern Illinois	10	–	8	.556	14	–	13	.519
Eastern Illinois	9	–	9	.500	13	–	15	.464
Central Connecticut State	9	–	9	.500	13	–	15	.464
Troy State	8	–	10	.444	11	–	16	.407
Youngstown State	7	–	11	.389	12	–	15	.444
Chicago State	2	–	16	.111	2	–	25	.074
† 1996 Mid-Con Tournament winner Rankings from AP Poll

The 1995–96 UMKC Kangaroos men's basketball team represented the University of Missouri–Kansas City during the 1995–96 NCAA Division I men's basketball season. The Kangaroos played their home games off-campus at Municipal Auditorium in Kansas City, Missouri as a member of the Mid–Continent Conference.

== Previous season ==
The Kangaroos finished the 1994–95 season with a record of 7–19 overall, 7–11 in the Mid–Continent Conference to finish in seventh place.

== Roster ==
1995–96 UMKC Kangaroos men's basketball team
Players
Coaches

Pos.	#	Name	Height	Weight	Year	Previous school	Hometown
C	42	Rick Muller	6 ft 10 in (2.08 m)	225 lb (102 kg)	RS Sr		Kansas City, MO
G	20	Travis Salmon	6 ft 5 in (1.96 m)	200 lb (91 kg)	RS Sr		Creighton, MO
G	21	Curtis Barnes	5 ft 11 in (1.8 m)	170 lb (77 kg)	Sr		Grandview, MO
C	44	Greg Gerhant	6 ft 9 in (2.06 m)	245 lb (111 kg)	Sr		Lublin, Poland
F	5	Chris Haynes	6 ft 5 in (1.96 m)	195 lb (88 kg)	Sr		Memphis, TN
F	33	Chris Johnson	6 ft 6 in (1.98 m)	230 lb (104 kg)	Sr		Boulder, CO
G	25	Darecko Rawlins	6 ft 5 in (1.96 m)	185 lb (84 kg)	Sr	Millington Central HS	Memphis, TN
G	4	Erin Washington	5 ft 10 in (1.78 m)	160 lb (73 kg)	Sr		Mesquite, TX
G		Vinson Smith (injured) (redshirt)	6 ft 3 in (1.91 m)	—	Jr	Youngstown State; F. L. Schlagle HS	Kansas City, KS
C	45	Tony Berg	6 ft 9 in (2.06 m)	215 lb (98 kg)	RS So		Colorado Springs, CO
G	32	Brad Moulder (injured) (redshirt)	6 ft 7 in (2.01 m)	190 lb (86 kg)	Fr		Camdenton, MO
G	13	Nakia Richmond	6 ft 2 in (1.88 m)	175 lb (79 kg)	Fr	Frayser HS	Memphis, TN
F	34	Chaz Smith	6 ft 6 in (1.98 m)	210 lb (95 kg)	Fr	Hayden Catholic HS	Topeka, KS

Head coach

- Lee Hunt (Central Missouri State)

Assistant coach(es)

- Mike Nicholson (Missouri)

Legend

- (C) Team captain
- (S) Suspended
- (I) Ineligible
- (W) Walk-on
- (5Y) Fifth-year Senior
- Injured
- Current redshirt

Roster
Last update: November 3, 2024

== Schedule & Results ==
Date time, TV	Rank^{#}	Opponent^{#}	Result	Record	High points	High rebounds	High assists	Site (attendance) city, state
Regular Season
November 24, 1995*		at Montana	L 60–70	0–1	20 – Salmon	7 – Rawlins	6 – Washington	Harry Adams Field House (5,077); Missoula, MT
November 28, 1995*		Baylor	W 70–55	1–1	26 – Rawlins	14 – Rawlins	5 – Washington	Municipal Auditorium (2,202); Kansas City, MO
December 9, 1995*; 7:00 PM		Saint Louis	L 74–82 ^{2OT}	1–2	20 – Rawlins	9 – Rawlins	4 – Salmon, Washington	Municipal Auditorium (3,610); Kansas City, MO
December 22, 1995*		Kansas State	L 54–69	1–3	14 – Washington	9 – Rawlins	5 – Washington	Municipal Auditorium (5,878); Kansas City, MO
December 28, 1995*		Creighton	W 72–70 ^{OT}	2–3	14 – Rawlins, Salmon, Berg	11 – Rawlins	2 – Rawlins, Washington, Berg	Municipal Auditorium (2,811); Kansas City, MO
January 2, 1996		at Central Connecticut State	W 66–59	3–3 (1–0)	20 – Muller	15 – Johnson	3 – Washington	William H. Detrick Gymnasium (220); New Britain, CT
January 4, 1996		at Troy State	L 89–90	3–4 (1–1)	18 – Salmon	9 – Rawlins	6 – Washington	Sartain Hall (1,000); Troy, AL
January 6, 1996		Buffalo	L 43–48	3–5 (1–2)	15 – Johnson	9 – Rawlins	6 – Richmond	Municipal Auditorium (3,313); Kansas City, MO
January 8, 1996		Youngstown State	L 55–66	3–6 (1–3)	20 – Johnson	12 – Johnson	4 – Richmond	Municipal Auditorium (1,680); Kansas City, MO
January 13, 1996		Western Illinois	W 80–60	4–6 (2–3)	20 – Rawlins	8 – Rawlins	6 – Washington	Municipal Auditorium (3,482); Kansas City, MO
January 18, 1996*		at Nebraska	L 69–87	4–7	24 – Washington	11 – Muller	4 – Washington	Bob Devaney Sports Center (6,785); Lincoln, NE
January 20, 1996		at Chicago State	L 66–77	4–8 (2–4)	18 – Rawlins	5 – Johnson, Rawlins, Washington	4 – Haynes, Richmond	Jacoby D. Dickens Physical; Education and Athletics Center (427); Chicago, IL
January 22, 1996		at Northeastern Illinois	W 83–79	5–8 (3–4)	22 – Washington	10 – Johnson	5 – Washington	Physical Education Complex; Chicago, IL
January 27, 1996		Valparaiso	L 57–65	5–9 (3–5)	18 – Rawlins	12 – Rawlins	3 – Washington	Municipal Auditorium (6,202); Kansas City, MO
January 29, 1996		Eastern Illinois	L 54–56	5–10 (3–6)	13 – Rawlins, Salmon	8 – Johnson, Salmon	7 – Washington	Municipal Auditorium (1,576); Kansas City, MO
February 3, 1996		at Youngstown State	W 69–59	6–10 (4–6)	17 – Haynes	10 – Salmon	7 – Washington	Beeghly Physical Education Center (1,452); Youngstown, OH
February 5, 1996		at Buffalo	W 72–63	7–10 (5–6)	19 – Washington	10 – Johnson, Muller	2 – Johnson, Muller, Washington	Alumni Arena (1,247); Amherst, NY
February 10, 1996*		at Colorado	L 55–84	7–11	15 – Richmond	7 – Muller	5 – Rawlins	Coors Events/Conference Center (4,149); Boulder, CO
February 12, 1996		at Western Illinois	L 57–72	7–12 (5–7)	18 – Rawlins	7 – Rawlins, Muller	4 – Haynes, Salmon, Washington	Western Hall (1,019); Macomb, IL
February 14, 1996*		at Oral Roberts	L 59–70	7–13	21 – Salmon	8 – Muller, Rawlins	3 – Washington	Mabee Center (3,014); Tulsa, OK
February 17, 1996		Northeastern Illinois	W 57–55	8–13 (6–7)	13 – Washington	10 – Rawlins	3 – Washington	Municipal Auditorium (3,298); Kansas City, MO
February 19, 1996		Chicago State	W 99–73	9–13 (7–7)	20 – Haynes	14 – Rawlins	7 – Washington	Municipal Auditorium (1,533); Kansas City, MO
February 22, 1996		at Eastern Illinois	W 82–73	10–13 (8–7)	16 – Rawlins, Washington	9 – Salmon	5 – Muller	Lantz Arena (1,166); Charleston, IL
February 24, 1996		at Valparaiso	L 57–69	10–14 (8–8)	16 – Rawlins	9 – Rawlins	3 – Rawlins, Richmond	Athletics–Recreation Center (4,557); Valparaiso, IN
February 27, 1996		Troy State	W 120–95	11–14 (9–8)	29 – Rawlins	9 – Johnson, Rawlins	6 – Rawlins	Municipal Auditorium (1,928); Kansas City, MO
February 29, 1996		Central Connecticut State	W 76–69	12–14 (10–8)	23 – Muller	10 – Rawlins	5 – Washington	Municipal Auditorium (2,381); Kansas City, MO
Conference Tournament
March 3, 1996*; 8:30 PM	(3)	vs. (6) Central Connecticut State [Quarterfinal]	L 83–89	12–15	21 – Muller	13 – Rawlins	4 – Washington	The MARK of the Quad Cities; Moline, IL
*Non-conference game. ^{#}Rankings from AP Poll. (#) Tournament seedings in parentheses. All times are in Central Standard Time (CST).
