= 1990–91 UMKC Kangaroos men's basketball team =

American college basketball season

1990–91 UMKC Kangaroos men's basketball
- Conference: Independent
- Record: 15–14
- Head coach: Lee Hunt (4th season)
- Home arena: Municipal Auditorium

1990–91 NCAA Division I men's basketball independents standings
| | Conf. | | | | Overall |
| Team | W | | L | PCT | W | | L | PCT |
|---|---|---|---|---|---|---|---|---|
| No. 24 DePaul | - | – | - | – | 20 | – | 9 | .690 |
| Wright State | - | – | - | – | 19 | – | 9 | .679 |
| Milwaukee | - | – | - | – | 18 | – | 10 | .643 |
| Southern Utah | - | – | - | – | 16 | – | 12 | .571 |
| Missouri–Kansas City | - | – | - | – | 15 | – | 14 | .517 |
| Youngstown State | - | – | - | – | 12 | – | 16 | .429 |
| Brooklyn | - | – | - | – | 11 | – | 16 | .407 |
| Notre Dame | - | – | - | – | 12 | – | 20 | .375 |
| Miami (FL) | - | – | - | – | 9 | – | 19 | .321 |
| Southeastern Louisiana | - | – | - | – | 9 | – | 19 | .321 |
| Cal State Northridge | - | – | - | – | 8 | – | 20 | .286 |
| Florida International | - | – | - | – | 6 | – | 22 | .214 |
| Liberty | - | – | - | – | 5 | – | 23 | .179 |
| Chicago State | - | – | - | – | 4 | – | 24 | .143 |
| Nicholls State | - | – | - | – | 3 | – | 25 | .107 |
| Northeastern Illinois | - | – | - | – | 2 | – | 25 | .074 |
| US International | - | – | - | – | 2 | – | 26 | .071 |
Rankings from AP Poll

The 1990–91 UMKC Kangaroos men's basketball team represented the University of Missouri–Kansas City during the 1990–91 NCAA Division I men's basketball season. The Kangaroos played their home games off-campus at Municipal Auditorium in Kansas City, Missouri as an independent.

== Previous season ==
The Kangaroos finished the 1989–90 season with a record of 13–15.

== Roster ==
1990–91 UMKC Kangaroos men's basketball team
Players
Coaches

| Pos. | # | Name | Height | Weight | Year | Previous school | Hometown |
|---|---|---|---|---|---|---|---|
| C | 45 | David Robinson (injured) (redshirt) | 6 ft 10 in (2.08 m) | 230 lb (104 kg) | Sr | Joplin HS | Joplin, MO |
| C | 42 | Edward Williams | 6 ft 8 in (2.03 m) | — | Sr | Houston Baptist |
| F | 53 | Anthony Davis | 6 ft 9 in (2.06 m) | — | Jr | Seminole State; F. L. Schlagle HS | Kansas City, KS |
| C | 22 | John Davis | 7 ft 1 in (2.16 m) | — | Jr | Northland Community & Technical |
| G | 11 | Kent Denmon | 6 ft 3 in (1.91 m) | — | Jr | Hickman Mills HS | Kansas City, MO |
| G | 40 | Mark Echols | 6 ft 5 in (1.96 m) | — | So | Gosnell HS |
| G | 24 | Ronnie Schmitz | 6 ft 4 in (1.93 m) | — | So | Ridgeway HS | Memphis, TN |
| F | 33 | Joe Seabrooks | 6 ft 6 in (1.98 m) | — | RS Fr | | Atlanta, GA |
| G | 13 | Terry Dickerson | 6 ft 2 in (1.88 m) | — | Fr | Fayette–Ware HS | Somerville, TN |
| G | 23 | Tony Dumas | 6 ft 6 in (1.98 m) | — | Fr | Millington Central HS | Millington, TN |
| F | 41 | Jeff Spiva | 6 ft 8 in (2.03 m) | — | Fr |

Head coach

- Lee Hunt (Central Missouri State)

Assistant coach(es)

Legend

- (C) Team captain
- (S) Suspended
- (I) Ineligible
- (W) Walk-on
- (5Y) Fifth-year Senior
- Injured
- Current redshirt

Roster
Last update: November 3, 2024

== Schedule & Results ==
| Date time, TV | Rank^{#} | Opponent^{#} | Result | Record | High points | High rebounds | High assists | Site (attendance) city, state |
Regular Season
| November 23, 1990*; 11:05 PM | | vs. Wisconsin–Eau Claire; Hawaii–Hilo Classic [Semifinal] | L 62–81 | 0–1 | 22 – Schmitz | 9 – A.Davis | 2 – Schmitz, Dickerson | Afook-Chinen Civic Auditorium (510); Hilo, HI |
| November 24, 1990*; 11:05 PM | | vs. Carleton; Hawaii–Hilo Classic [Consolation Final] | W 76–64 | 1–1 | 23 – Schmitz | 9 – A.Davis | 5 – Denmon | Afook-Chinen Civic Auditorium (300); Hilo, HI |
| November 29, 1990*; 7:05 PM | | Southern California College | W 88–69 | 2–1 | 18 – Schmitz | 14 – A.Davis | 4 – Denmon | Municipal Auditorium (1,609); Kansas City, MO |
| December 1, 1990*; 7:05 PM | | Texas–Pan American | W 86–82 | 3–1 | 20 – Schmitz | 10 – A.Davis | 8 – Denmon | Municipal Auditorium (1,582); Kansas City, MO |
| December 3, 1990*; 7:05 PM | | at Jackson State | L 72–81 | 3–2 | 19 – A.Davis | 13 – A.Davis | 3 – Denmon, Schmitz | Lee E. Williams; Athletics and Assembly Center; Jackson, MS |
| December 8, 1990*; 7:05 PM | | Tennessee Tech | W 87–78 | 4–2 | 31 – Schmitz | 8 – A.Davis | 6 – Schmitz | Municipal Auditorium (1,410); Kansas City, MO |
| December 10, 1990*; 7:05 PM | | Air Force | W 74–53 | 5–2 | 19 – Echols | 7 – A.Davis | 7 – Dumas | Municipal Auditorium (1,382); Kansas City, MO |
| December 12, 1990*; 7:05 PM | | Southwest Missouri State | L 51–65 | 5–3 | 13 – Robinson | 6 – A.Davis | 4 – Dickerson | Municipal Auditorium (4,339); Kansas City, MO |
| December 15, 1990*; 7:05 PM | | Northeastern Illinois | W 93–81 | 6–3 | 22 – Schmitz | 13 – Robinson | 4 – Robinson, Dumas | Municipal Auditorium (1,006); Kansas City, MO |
| December 17, 1990*; 7:05 PM | | Denver | W 101–73 | 7–3 | 36 – Schmitz | 12 – A.Davis | 6 – Denmon | Municipal Auditorium (1,082); Kansas City, MO |
| December 29, 1990*; 7:05 PM | | at Wisconsin–Milwaukee | L 88–95 | 7–4 | 23 – Schmitz | 7 – A.Davis | 6 – Denmon, Dickerson | J. Martin Klotsche Center (557); Milwaukee, WI |
| January 2, 1991*; 7:05 PM | | Oklahoma State | L 67–84 | 7–5 | 24 – Schmitz | 9 – A.Davis | 7 – Denmon | Municipal Auditorium (4,491); Kansas City, MO |
| January 5, 1991*; 7:05 PM | | Wright State | L 90–98 | 7–6 | 24 – Robinson | 12 – Robinson | 4 – Dickerson, Dumas | Municipal Auditorium (1,247); Kansas City, MO |
| January 7, 1991*; 7:05 PM | | at Western Kentucky | L 75–91 | 7–7 | 20 – Schmitz, Dumas | 9 – Dumas | 3 – Schmitz, Dickerson, Dumas | E. A. Diddle Arena (3,800); Bowling Green, KY |
| January 9, 1991*; 7:05 PM | | No. 18 Nebraska | L 78–97 | 7–8 | 22 – Dumas | 11 – A.Davis | 9 – Denmon | Municipal Auditorium (5,396); Kansas City, MO |
| January 12, 1991*; 7:05 PM | | at Northeastern Illinois | W 77–69 | 8–8 | 25 – Schmitz | 9 – A.Davis | 5 – Dumas | Physical Education Complex (141); Chicago, IL |
| January 15, 1991*; 7:05 PM | | Kansas State | L 62–76 | 8–9 | 14 – Denmon | 5 – Denmon | 5 – Dickerson | Municipal Auditorium (6,252); Kansas City, MO |
| January 19, 1991*; 6:05 PM | | at Wright State | L 90–101 | 8–10 | 17 – Schmitz | 8 – A.Davis | 6 – Denmon | Ervin J. Nutter Center (8,232); Fairborn, OH |
| January 21, 1991*; 7:05 PM | | at Kansas State | L 90–101 | 8–11 | 15 – Williams | 7 – A.Davis | 4 – Denmon | Fred Bramlage Coliseum (10,327); Manhattan, KS |
| January 23, 1991*; 7:05 PM | | Eastern Kentucky | W 83–73 | 9–11 | 22 – Dumas | 6 – Dickerson | 7 – Dumas | Municipal Auditorium (1,451); Kansas City, MO |
| January 26, 1991*; 6:05 PM | | at Florida International | W 79–72 | 10–11 | 26 – Dumas | 5 – A.Davis, Dumas | 5 – Denmon | Golden Panther Arena (1,106); Miami, FL |
| February 2, 1991*; 7:05 PM | | at Tennessee State | W 83–79 | 11–11 | 21 – Dumas | 4 – Dickerson | 5 – Dickerson | Gentry Complex (2,250); Nashville, TN |
| February 6, 1991*; 7:05 PM | | Jackson State | W 76–73 | 12–11 | 23 – Dumas | 12 – A.Davis | 3 – Schnitz, Dumas | Municipal Auditorium (2,289); Kansas City, MO |
| February 9, 1991*; 7:05 PM | | at Tennessee Tech | L 74–84 | 12–12 | 23 – Dumas | 9 – A.Davis | 3 – Denmon | Hooper Eblen Center (3,875); Cookeville, TN |
| February 16, 1991*; 6:05 PM | | at Eastern Kentucky | L 76–83 | 12–13 | 19 – Schmitz | 13 – A.Davis | 5 – Dumas | Alumni Coliseum (3,150); Richmond, KY |
| February 18, 1991*; 7:05 PM | | United States International | W 95–83 | 13–13 | 26 – Dumas | 18 – A.Davis | 6 – Schmitz | Municipal Auditorium (2,221); Kansas City, MO |
| February 23, 1991*; 7:05 PM | | Florida International | W 104–54 | 14–13 | 34 – Schmitz | 11 – A.Davis | 5 – Schmitz | Municipal Auditorium (3,218); Kansas City, MO |
| February 25, 1991*; 7:05 PM | | at Texas–Pan American | L 75–87 | 14–14 | 28 – Dumas | 7 – A.Davis, Seabrooks | 7 – Denmon | UTPA Fieldhouse (3,047); Edinburg, TX |
| March 4, 1991*; 9:05 PM | | at United States International | W 128–119 | 15–14 | 51 – Schmitz | 15 – A.Davis | 8 – Dumas | Golden Hall (483); San Diego, CA |
*Non-conference game. ^{#}Rankings from AP Poll. (#) Tournament seedings in parentheses. All times are in Central Standard Time (CST).
