= Victor Turner (disambiguation) =

Victor Turner (1920–1983) was a British cultural anthropologist

Victor Turner may also refer to:

- Victor Buller Turner (1900–1972), English recipient of the Victoria Cross
- Victor Turner (American football), head football coach for the Tuskegee University Golden Tigers, 1922
- Victor Turner (civil servant) (1892–1974), English-Pakistani civil service officer, statistician and economist
- Victor Snipes (who legally changed his name to Victor Turner; 1970–2007), American basketball player
