= Black Oak Creek =

Stream in the American state of Missouri

Black Oak Creek is a stream in Cass and Henry counties in the U.S. state of Missouri. It is a tributary of Knob Creek.

The stream headwaters arise in eastern Cass County at 38°32′24″N 94°04′17″W and the stream flows southeast into Henry County and then south passing east of Creighton and under Missouri Route 7 to its confluence with Knob Creek at 38°28′47″N 94°03′19″W.

Black Oak Creek was so named due to the abundance of black oak timber along its course.

== See also ==
- List of rivers of Missouri
