= 1989–90 UMKC Kangaroos men's basketball team =

American college basketball season

1989–90 UMKC Kangaroos men's basketball
- Conference: Independent
- Record: 13–15
- Head coach: Lee Hunt (3rd season)
- Home arena: Municipal Auditorium

1989–90 NCAA Division I men's basketball independents standings
	Conf.				Overall
Team	W		L	PCT	W		L	PCT
Wright State		–		–	21	–	7	.750
Northern Illinois		–		–	17	–	11	.607
Akron		–		–	16	–	12	.571
DePaul		–		–	20	–	15	.571
Notre Dame		–		–	16	–	13	.552
Miami (FL)		–		–	13	–	15	.464
UMKC		–		–	13	–	15	.464
Southern Utah		–		–	13	–	15	.464
UMBC		–		–	12	–	16	.429
U.S. International		–		–	12	–	16	.429
Liberty		–		–	11	–	17	.393
Youngstown State		–		–	8	–	20	.286
Brooklyn		–		–	7	–	21	.250
Central Florida		–		–	7	–	21	.250
Florida International		–		–	7	–	21	.250
Central Connecticut State		–		–	6	–	22	.214
Chicago State		–		–	6	–	22	.214
Nicholls State		–		–	4	–	23	.148
Davidson		–		–	4	–	24	.143
Rankings from AP Poll

The 1989–90 UMKC Kangaroos men's basketball team represented the University of Missouri–Kansas City during the 1989–90 NCAA Division I men's basketball season. The Kangaroos played their home games off-campus at Municipal Auditorium in Kansas City, Missouri as an independent.

This season was also UMKC's first as a full NCAA Division I member, which made them eligible for postseason competition.

== Previous season ==
The Kangaroos finished the 1988–89 season with a record of 9–18.

== Roster ==
1989–90 UMKC Kangaroos men's basketball team
Players
Coaches

Pos.	#	Name	Height	Weight	Year	Previous school	Hometown
F	30	Jay Boster	6 ft 5 in (1.96 m)	185 lb (84 kg)	Sr	Independence (KS) CC; Bennington HS	Bennington, KS
G	12	Reggie DeGrate	6 ft 1 in (1.85 m)	—	Sr
F	55	Baron McLaughlin	6 ft 6 in (1.98 m)	210 lb (95 kg)	Sr	Parkland; Lane Tech College Prep HS	Chicago, IL
G	25	Frank Molak	6 ft 1 in (1.85 m)	180 lb (82 kg)	Sr	Iowa Lakes CC; Kuemper Catholic HS	Arcadia, IA
F	44	Darrell Colbert	6 ft 8 in (2.03 m)	—	Jr
G	20	Terry Jackson	6 ft 3 in (1.91 m)	—	Jr
F	34	Chris O'Neal	6 ft 7 in (2.01 m)	—	Jr
C	45	David Robinson	6 ft 10 in (2.08 m)	230 lb (104 kg)	Jr	Joplin HS	Joplin, MO
C	42	Edward Williams	6 ft 8 in (2.03 m)	—	Jr	Houston Baptist
G	11	Kent Denmon	6 ft 3 in (1.91 m)	—	So	Hickman Mills HS	Kansas City, MO
G	40	Mark Echols	6 ft 5 in (1.96 m)	—	Fr	Gosnell HS
G	24	Ronnie Schmitz	6 ft 4 in (1.93 m)	—	Fr	Ridgeway HS	Memphis, TN
F	33	Joe Seabrooks (redshirt)	6 ft 6 in (1.98 m)	—	Fr		Atlanta, GA

Head coach

- Lee Hunt (Central Missouri State)

Assistant coach(es)

Legend

- (C) Team captain
- (S) Suspended
- (I) Ineligible
- (W) Walk-on
- (5Y) Fifth-year Senior
- Injured
- Current redshirt

Roster
Last update: November 3, 2024

== Schedule & Results ==
Date time, TV	Rank^{#}	Opponent^{#}	Result	Record	High points	High rebounds	High assists	Site (attendance) city, state
Regular Season
November 25, 1989*; 7:05 PM		at Nebraska	L 76–91	0–1	25 – Boster	7 – Robinson	7 – Molak	Bob Devaney Sports Center (8,570); Lincoln, NE
November 30, 1989*; 7:05 PM		MacMurray	W 89–55	1–1	22 – Schmitz	8 – Colbert	4 – Boster	Municipal Auditorium (1,582); Kansas City, MO
December 2, 1989*; 7:05 PM		San Francisco State	W 94–72	2–1	16 – Schmitz	9 – Colbert, O'Neal	4 – Boster, Denmon	Municipal Auditorium (1,468); Kansas City, MO
December 6, 1989*; 7:05 PM		at Kansas State	L 57–78	2–2	19 – Robinson	10 – Robinson	4 – Boster	Fred Bramlage Coliseum (11,150); Manahattan, KS
December 9, 1989*; 7:05 PM		Wisconsin–Green Bay	L 59–64	2–3	18 – Schmitz	14 – Robinson	7 – Boster	Municipal Auditorium (1,278); Kansas City, MO
December 11, 1989*; 7:05 PM		Tulsa	L 75–85	2–4	17 – Schmitz	9 – Robinson	6 – Denmon	Municipal Auditorium (2,512); Kansas City, MO
December 16, 1989*; 7:05 PM		Western Illinois	W 84–73	3–4	19 – Schmitz	11 – Williams	4 – Colbert, Robinson, Denmon	Municipal Auditorium (1,628); Kansas City, MO
December 18, 1989*; 7:05 PM		Creighton	L 106–86	3–5	20 – Schmitz	6 – Colbert	5 – Denmon	Municipal Auditorium (1,492); Kansas City, MO
December 21, 1989*; 7:05 PM		American	L 71–76	3–6	19 – Jackson	10 – Robinson	3 – Schmitz	Municipal Auditorium (1,110); Kansas City, MO
December 29, 1989*; 7:05 PM		vs. Stanford; BMA Holiday Classic [Semifinal]	L 50–70	3–7	10 – McLaughlin	5 – Williams	2 – Denmon	Kemper Arena (12,700); Kansas City, MO
December 30, 1989*; 7:05 PM		vs. Texas–Pan American; BMA Holiday Classic [Consolation Final]	L 53–60	3–8	11 – O'Neal, Robinson	11 – O'Neal	3 – Molak	Kemper Arena (14,225); Kansas City, MO
January 3, 1990*; 7:05 PM		Mississippi Valley State	W 81–62	4–8	14 – Schmitz	7 – Robinson	6 – Denmon	Municipal Auditorium (1,310); Kansas City, MO
January 6, 1990*; 8:05 PM		at Air Force	L 65–71	4–9	17 – Schmitz	6 – Robinson	5 – DeGrate	Clune Arena (3,426); Air Force Academy, CO
January 8, 1990*; 7:05 PM		Tennessee State	W 100–85	5–9	24 – Schmitz	8 – DeGrate	6 – Echols	Municipal Auditorium (1,392); Kansas City, MO
January 10, 1990*; 7:05 PM		Texas–Pan American	W 77–75	6–9	19 – Robinson	11 – Robinson	6 – DeGrate	Municipal Auditorium (1,638); Kansas City, MO
January 13, 1990*; 7:05 PM		Northern Illinois	W 69–51	7–9	17 – Robinson, DeGrate	6 – Robinson	5 – Echols	Municipal Auditorium (2,712); Kansas City, MO
January 18, 1990*; 7:05 PM		Wisconsin–Milwaukee	W 93–80	8–9	31 – Schmitz	6 – Colbert	3 – Colbert, Schmitz	Municipal Auditorium (2,012); Kansas City, MO
January 22, 1990*; 7:05 PM		Youngstown State	W 81–72	9–9	19 – DeGrate, Schmitz	10 – Colbert	5 – O'Neal	Municipal Auditorium (1,556); Kansas City, MO
January 27, 1990*; 7:30 PM		at Western Illinois	L 60–74	9–10	13 – Colbert	5 – Colbert	4 – O'Neal	Western Hall (3,247); Macomb, IL
January 31, 1990*; 7:05 PM		at Southwest Missouri State	L 69–86	9–11	28 – Colbert	5 – Robinson	8 – Denmon	John Q. Hammons; Student Center (8,042); Springfield, MO
February 3, 1990*; 7:05 PM		at Rice	L 80–87	9–12	27 – Schmitz	7 – Robinson	7 – Denmon	Rice Gymnasium (3,317); Houston, TX
February 5, 1990*; 7:05 PM		at Texas–Pan American	L 78–79	9–13	19 – Schmitz	8 – Colbert	8 – Denmon	UTPA Fieldhouse (2,592); Edinburg, TX
February 12, 1990*; 7:05 PM		at Samford	W 109–77	10–13	25 – Schmitz	8 – Robinson	5 – Molak, Robinson	Seibert Hall (908); Birmingham, AL
February 17, 1990*; 7:05 PM		United States International	W 109–91	11–13	26 – Robinson	12 – Robinson	7 – Denmon	Municipal Auditorium (2,482); Kansas City, MO
February 21, 1990*; 7:05 PM		at Alcorn State	W 72–69	12–13	18 – O'Neal	9 – O'Neal	3 – Schmitz	Physical Education Complex (2,215); Lorman, MS
February 26, 1990*; 7:05 PM		at Wisconsin–Green Bay	L 66–83	12–14	21 – Schmitz	11 – Colbert	4 – Schmitz	Brown County Veterans; Memorial Arena (4,851); Ashwaubenon, WI
March 5, 1990*; 7:05 PM		Alcorn State	W 96–87	13–14	38 – Schmitz	12 – McLaughlin	8 – Boster	Municipal Auditorium (3,286); Kansas City, MO
March 6, 1990*; 7:05 PM		at Chicago State	L 84–88	13–15	23 – Schmitz	19 – Colbert	3 – Boster, Denmon	CSU Athletics Building (300); Chicago, IL
*Non-conference game. ^{#}Rankings from AP Poll. (#) Tournament seedings in parentheses. All times are in Central Standard Time (CST).
