= Dan Stanley =

American football coach (born c. 1937)

Biographical details
- Born: c. 1937 (age 88–89); Kansas City, Missouri, U.S.
- Education: Missouri Valley College (1959)

Playing career

Football
- 1955–1958: Missouri Valley
- 1961–1962: Kansas City Jiggers / Rivals

Track and field
- 1955–1958: Missouri Valley
- Positions: Fullback (football); Javelin throw (track and field)

Coaching career (HC unless noted)

Football
- 1959–1961: William Chrisman HS (MO) (assistant)
- 1962–1964: Central HS (MO) (assistant)
- 1965–1970: Westport HS (MO)
- 1971–1994: Winnetonka HS (MO)
- 1995: William Jewell (ST/RB)
- 1996–2001: Missouri Valley
- ?–?: Shawnee Mission North HS (KS) (assistant)
- ?–2007: Pembroke Hill School (MO) (assistant)
- 2008–2011: Westport HS (MO)
- 2012–2013: University Academy (MO)
- 2014: Lincoln Prep Academy (MO) (assistant)

Head coaching record
- Overall: 30–32 (college)
- Tournaments: 0–1 (NAIA playoffs)

Accomplishments and honors

Championships
- 1 HAAC (1999)

Daniel J. Stanley (born c. 1937) is an American former college football coach. He was the head football coach for Westport High School from 1965 to 1970 and from 2008 to 2011, Winnetonka High School from 1971 to 1994, Missouri Valley College from 1996 to 2001, and the University Academy from 2012 to 2013.

== Playing career ==
Stanley was born in Kansas City, Missouri, and attended Southeast High School. He played college football for Missouri Valley as a fullback in the team's single wing offense. He was known by his teammates as "Tanker" or "Dan the Man." During his junior year in 1957, despite missing time due to injuries, he ran for 242 yards on 57 attempts. In his senior year, he led the team in scoring with 84 points and led the team in rushing yards with 661 yards on the year. He was also used as an occasional quarterback and kick returner. He specialized in the javelin throw in track and field.

From 1961, Stanley played for the semi-professional Kansas City Jiggers which were known as the Rivals in 1962.

== Coaching career ==
In 1959, Stanley began his coaching career at William Chrisman High School. In 1962, he was hired as an assistant for Central High School.

In 1965, Stanley became the head football coach for Westport High School. He finished his first season with a record of 2–6–1. In 1971, he was hired as the first head football coach for the newly opened Winnetonka High School. During his tenure as head coach he ran the Delaware Wing-T, single-wing, and wishbone offenses. He led his team to five conference titles. He held the position until his retirement in 1994. His retirement was short-lived as he was hired as the special teams coordinator and running backs coach for William Jewell in 1995. In 1996, he was hired as the head football coach for his alma mater, Missouri Valley. In six seasons as head coach, he led the team to a 30–32 record. His best season came in 1999 when he led the team to a 9–3 record, a Heart of America Athletic Conference (HAAC) title, and a playoff berth. He resigned following the 2001 season due to his wife's health.

Stanley returned to coaching sometime after he resigned from Missouri Valley as he was an assistant for Shawnee Mission North High School. He was also an assistant for The Pembroke Hill School until 2007. In 2008, he returned as the head football coach for Westport High School. In 2012, he was hired as the head football coach for the University Academy. He held the position for two seasons. He finished his coaching career as an assistant coach for Lincoln College Preparatory Academy in 2014.

== Personal life and honors ==
On December 5, 1958, Stanley married Claudine Lea. They had two kids together. In 2001, when Missouri Valley was playing against Evangel his wife had a seizure which led to a brain aneurysm. Due to her debilitating health, he resigned from his head coaching post following the 2001 season. He returned to coaching after his wife's health improved. His wife died on January 30, 2022.

Stanley was inducted into the Missouri Valley Hall of Fame.

== Head coaching record ==
=== College ===
Year	Team	Overall	Conference	Standing	Bowl/playoffs	NAIA^{#}
Missouri Valley Vikings (Heart of America Athletic Conference) (1996–2001)
1996	Missouri Valley	1–9	1–8	T–9th		
1997	Missouri Valley	5–5	4–5	T–6th		
1998	Missouri Valley	7–3	6–3	3rd		23
1999	Missouri Valley	9–3	8–1	1st	L NAIA First Round	9
2000	Missouri Valley	3–7	3–6	T–6th		
2001	Missouri Valley	5–5	5–5	T–4th		
Missouri Valley:		30–32	27–28			
Total:		30–32				
National championship Conference title Conference division title or championship game berth
