= 1995 Mid-Continent Conference men's basketball tournament =

- Classification: Division I
- Season: 1994–95
- Teams: 6
- Site: Campus Sites (Final at Athletics–Recreation Center in Valparaiso, Indiana)
- Champions: Valparaiso (1st title)
- Winning coach: Homer Drew (1st title)
- MVP: Bryce Drew (Valparaiso)
- Mid-Continent Conference men's basketball tournaments

1994–95 Mid-Continent Conference men's basketball standings
	Conf.				Overall
Team	W		L	PCT	W		L	PCT
Valparaiso †	14	–	4	.778	20	–	8	.714
Western Illinois	13	–	5	.722	20	–	8	.714
Buffalo	12	–	6	.667	18	–	10	.643
Youngstown State	10	–	8	.556	18	–	10	.643
Troy State	10	–	8	.556	11	–	16	.407
Eastern Illinois	10	–	8	.556	16	–	13	.552
Missouri–Kansas City	7	–	11	.389	7	–	19	.269
Central Connecticut State	6	–	12	.333	8	–	18	.308
Chicago State	6	–	12	.333	6	–	20	.231
Northeastern Illinois	2	–	16	.111	4	–	22	.154
† 1995 Mid-Con Tournament winner Rankings from AP Poll

The 1995 Mid-Continent Conference men's basketball tournament was held March 3–7, 1995, at campus sites. This was the twelfth edition of the tournament for the Association of Mid-Continent Universities, now known as the Summit League. As a result of 6 schools leaving the Mid-Continent Conference for what would become the Horizon League the winner did not receive an automatic bid to the 1995 NCAA Division I men's basketball tournament, when in previous years that had been the case.

== Bracket ==
Quarterfinals; March 3
4	Youngstown State	90
5	Troy State	83
3	Buffalo	70
6	Eastern Illinois	65

Semifinals; March 4
1	Valparaiso	77
4	Youngstown State	52
2	Western Illinois	76
3	Buffalo	70

Final; March 5
1	Valparaiso	88
2	Western Illinois	85 ^{3OT}
