= Darrell Lynn Judge =

American physicist (1934–2014)

Darrell Lynn Judge (November 2, 1934, Albion, Illinois – August 26, 2014, Temecula, California) was an American physicist, known for his research in solar physics, spectroscopy, and space science.

== Biography ==
His father was Virgil H. Judge, the first president of Lake Land College in Mattoon, Illinois. Darrell L. Judge graduated from Edwards County High School in 1952. He received in 1956 a B.S. with a joint major in physics and mathematics from Eastern Illinois State College (renamed in 1957 Eastern Illinois University). At the University of Southern California (USC) he graduated in physics with an M.A. in 1963 and a Ph.D. in 1965. After receiving his Ph.D. he joined the USC faculty in the department of physics and astronomy. He became a full professor in 1975 and retired from USC in 2013 as professor emeritus. In 1978 he was the founding director of USC's Space Sciences Center (SSC) and continued as the SSC's director until his retirement in 2013. The present director of the SSC is Leonid Didkovsky.

Judge did research on "space exploration, atomic and molecular physics, ultraviolet imaging, deep space and sounding rockets, and star systems." He and his colleagues designed and built various instruments used onboard NASA space flight missions. Such instruments were used to monitor electromagnetic radiation from the infrared to the extreme ultraviolet. The instruments were essential for experiments flown on the Pioneer 10 and 11 space probes and the SOHO (Solar and Heliospheric Observatory) spacecraft.

Darrell Judge received in 1974 the NASA Exceptional Scientific Achievement Award and in 1991 the von Humboldt U.S. Senior Scientist Award. He was elected in 1996 a fellow of the American Physical Society for "his pioneering work on the fundamental properties of atoms and molecules using selected monochromatic photon excitation and dispersed fluorescence, and their applications in space physics."

He married Marjorie Sanders Waddell in June 1959 in Brevard County, Florida. They met at Cape Canaveral, where both were employed by the Ramo-Wooldridge Corporation (which became TRW Inc. in July 1965).

Upon his death, he was survived by his widow, two daughters, a son, and five grandchildren.

== Selected publications ==
- Sonett, C. P.; Judge, D. L.; Sims, A. R.; Kelso, J. M. (1960). "A radial rocket survey of the distant geomagnetic field". Journal of Geophysical Research. 65: 55–68. Bibcode:1960JGR....65...55S. doi:10.1029/JZ065i001p00055.
- Smith, E. J.; Coleman, P. J.; Judge, D. L.; Sonett, C. P. (1960). "Characteristics of the extraterrestrial current system: Explorer VI and Pioneer V". Journal of Geophysical Research. 65 (6): 1858–1861. Bibcode:1960JGR....65.1858S. doi:10.1029/JZ065i006p01858.
- Judge, Darrell L.; Coleman, Paul J. (1962). "Observations of low-frequency hydromagnetic waves in the distant geomagnetic field: Explorer 6". Journal of Geophysical Research. 67 (13): 5071–5090. Bibcode:1962JGR....67.5071J. doi:10.1029/JZ067i013p05071.
- Welch, A. R.; Judge, D. L. (1972). "Absolute Specific Photodissociation Cross Sections of CH_{4} in the Extreme Ultraviolet". The Journal of Chemical Physics. 57 (1): 286–290. Bibcode:1972JChPh..57..286W. doi:10.1063/1.1677958.
- Lee, L.C.; Carlson, R.W.; Judge, D.L.; Ogawa, M. (1973). "The absorption cross sections of N_{2}, O_{2}, CO, NO, CO_{2}, N_{2}O, CH_{4}, C_{2}H_{4}, C_{2}H_{6} and C_{4}H_{10} from 180 to 700 Å". Journal of Quantitative Spectroscopy and Radiative Transfer. 13 (10): 1023–1031. Bibcode:1973JQSRT..13.1023L. doi:10.1016/0022-4073(73)90075-7.
- Carlson, R. W.; Judge, D. L. (1974). "Pioneer 10 ultraviolet photometer observations at Jupiter encounter". Journal of Geophysical Research. 79 (25): 3623–3633. Bibcode:1974JGR....79.3623C. doi:10.1029/JA079i025p03623.
- Judge, Darrell L.; Carlson, Robert W. (1974). "Pioneer 10 Observations of the Ultraviolet Glow in the Vicinity of Jupiter". Science. 183 (4122): 317–318. Bibcode:1974Sci...183..317J. doi:10.1126/science.183.4122.317. PMID 17821094. S2CID 38074374.
- Lee, L. C.; Phillips, E.; Judge, D. L. (1977). "Photoabsorption cross sections of CH_{4}, CF_{4}, CF_{3}Cl, SF_{6}, and C_{2}F_{6} from 175 to 770 Å". The Journal of Chemical Physics. 67 (3): 1237. Bibcode:1977JChPh..67.1237L. doi:10.1063/1.434935.
- Wu, F. M.; Judge, D. L. (1979). "Temperature and flow velocity of the interplanetary gases along solar radii". The Astrophysical Journal. 231: 594. Bibcode:1979ApJ...231..594W. doi:10.1086/157221.
- Judge, D. L.; Wu, F.-M.; Carlson, R. W. (1980). "Ultraviolet Photometer Observations of the Saturnian System". Science. 207 (4429): 431–434. Bibcode:1980Sci...207..431J. doi:10.1126/science.207.4429.431. PMID 17833554. S2CID 23781512.
- Robert Wu, C. Y.; Judge, Darrell L. (1981). "SO_{2} and CS_{2} cross section data in the ultraviolet region". Geophysical Research Letters. 8 (7): 769–771. Bibcode:1981GeoRL...8..769R. doi:10.1029/GL008i007p00769.
- Wu, C. Y. Robert; Chien, T. S.; Liu, G. S.; Judge, D. L.; Caldwell, J. J. (1989). "Photoabsorption and direct dissociation cross sections of C_{2}H_{2} in the 1530–1930 Å region: A temperature dependent study". The Journal of Chemical Physics. 91 (1): 272–280. Bibcode:1989JChPh..91..272W. doi:10.1063/1.457513.
- Chen, Fengzhong; Judge, D. L.; Robert Wu, C. Y.; Caldwell, J.; White, H. Peter; Wagener, R. (1991). "High-resolution, low-temperature photoabsorption cross sections of C_{2}H_{2}, PH_{3}, AsH_{3}, and GeH_{4}, with application to Saturn's atmosphere". Journal of Geophysical Research. 96 (E2): 17519. Bibcode:1991JGR....9617519C. doi:10.1029/91JE01687.
- Hall, D. T.; Shemansky, D. E.; Judge, D. L.; Gangopadhyay, P.; Gruntman, M. A. (1993). "Heliospheric hydrogen beyond 15 AU: Evidence for a termination shock". Journal of Geophysical Research. 98 (A9): 15185. Bibcode:1993JGR....9815185H. doi:10.1029/93JA01175.
- Hovestadt, D.; et al. (1995). "CELIAS - Charge, Element and Isotope Analysis System for SOHO". Solar Physics. 162 (1–2): 441–481. Bibcode:1995SoPh..162..441H. doi:10.1007/BF00733436. S2CID 189849701.
- Judge, D. L.; McMullin, D. R.; Ogawa, H. S.; Hovestadt, D.; Klecker, B.; Hilchenbach, M.; Möbius, E.; Canfield, L. R.; Vest, R. E.; Watts, R.; Tarrio, C.; Kühne, M.; Wurz, P. (1998). "First Solar EUV Irradiances Obtained from SOHO by the CELIAS/SEM". Solar Electromagnetic Radiation Study for Solar Cycle 22. pp. 161–173. doi:10.1007/978-94-011-5000-2_12. ISBN 978-94-010-6099-8. S2CID 117636102.
- Hilchenbach, M.; et al. (1998). "Detection of 55–80 keV Hydrogen Atoms of Heliospheric Origin by CELIAS/HSTOF on SOHO". The Astrophysical Journal. 503 (2): 916–922. Bibcode:1998ApJ...503..916H. doi:10.1086/306022.
- Tsurutani, B. T.; Judge, D. L.; Guarnieri, F. L.; Gangopadhyay, P.; Jones, A. R.; Nuttall, J.; Zambon, G. A.; Didkovsky, L.; Mannucci, A. J.; Iijima, B.; Meier, R. R.; Immel, T. J.; Woods, T. N.; Prasad, S.; Floyd, L.; Huba, J.; Solomon, S. C.; Straus, P.; Viereck, R. (2005). "The October 28, 2003 extreme EUV solar flare and resultant extreme ionospheric effects: Comparison to other Halloween events and the Bastille Day event". Geophysical Research Letters. 32 (3). Bibcode:2005GeoRL..32.3S09T. doi:10.1029/2004GL021475. S2CID 125314380.
- Tsurutani, B.T.; Mannucci, A.J.; Iijima, B.; Guarnieri, F.L.; Gonzalez, W.D.; Judge, D.L.; Gangopadhyay, P.; Pap, J. (2006). "The extreme Halloween 2003 solar flares (and Bastille Day, 2000 Flare), ICMEs, and resultant extreme ionospheric effects: A review". Advances in Space Research. 37 (8): 1583–1588. Bibcode:2006AdSpR..37.1583T. doi:10.1016/j.asr.2005.05.114.
- Benmoussa, A.; et al. (2013). "On-Orbit Degradation of Solar Instruments". Solar Physics. 288 (1): 389–434. arXiv:1304.5488. Bibcode:2013SoPh..288..389B. doi:10.1007/s11207-013-0290-z. S2CID 119183366.
