= Lake Land College =

Community college in Mattoon, Illinois, U.S.

Coordinates: 39.416846°N 88.380694°W

- Type: Public community college
- Established: 1966; 60 years ago
- Accreditation: HLC
- President: Jonathan "Josh" Bullock
- Students: 4,138 (fall 2025)
- Location: Mattoon, Illinois, U.S.
- Campus: Rural, 308 acres (125 ha)
- Newspaper: The Navigator
- Colors: Red and black
- Nickname: Lakers
- Sporting affiliations: NJCAA Division I Great Rivers Athletic Conference
- Mascot: Laker Louie
- Website: www.lakelandcollege.edu

Lake Land College is a public community college in Mattoon, Illinois. It was founded in 1966. As of the Fall 2025 semester Lake Land serves 4,138 students, mainly from the east-central Illinois region. The 308 acres (1.25 km^{2}) campus has seven major buildings plus eight supportive buildings, two campus ponds, and a 160 acres (0.65 km^{2}) agriculture land laboratory.

== History ==
Lake Land's creation was first approved in 1966 by a referendum in 13 public school districts centered on Mattoon. The first classes were held the following year in various buildings throughout the town. The first president of the college was Virgil H. Judge (who was the father of Darrell L. Judge). Construction on the college began in 1971 and continued in phases throughout the 1970s.

== Athletics ==
Lake Land College sponsors teams in three men's and four women's NJCAA sanctioned sports:

Men's sports	Women's sports
Baseball	Basketball
Basketball	Cross Country
Cross Country	Softball
	Volleyball

The Lakers have won one NJCAA National Championship which happened in 2021. The women's basketball team finished 24–2 and defeated Johnson County Community College 53–49 to win their first national championship. The Lakers have had several trips to the NJCAA National Tournament. The Lakers are known for making runs within the Great Rivers Athletic Conference (GRAC), and Region 24 Tournaments. The most successful programs at Lake Land are softball and women's basketball, particularly for their high number of NJCAA National Tournament Appearances.

The majority of Lake Land Athletics are played at Laker Fieldhouse. Laker Fieldhouse plays host to Women's Basketball, Men's Basketball, and Women's Volleyball matches. Lake Land has other facilities used for baseball and softball matches, which are officially named Laker Baseball Field and Laker Softball Field.

In 2025 Lake Land added both a men’s and a women’s cross country team.

== Notable alumni ==
- Darren Bailey, politician
- Gary Gaetti, professional baseball player
- Brad Halbrook, politician
- Rex Morgan, professional basketball player
- Victor Snipes, college basketball player
