= University Academy (Missouri) =

Charter school in Missouri, United States

Coordinates: 39°0′13.5″N 94°34′43.3″W

Information
- Established: 2000; 26 years ago
- Grades: Pre-Kindergarten - Grade 12
- Enrollment: c.1100
- Website: www.universityacademy.org

University Academy is a Pre-Kindergarten through 12th grade college-preparatory charter public school in Kansas City, Missouri, United States.

University Academy serves approximately 1,100 students in pre-kindergarten through 12th grade who reside in the Kansas City Missouri Schools District (“KCMSD”). As a charter public school, University Academy admits students on the basis of a random lottery drawn from a pool of applicants. All applicants must reside within the boundaries of the Kansas City Missouri Schools District.

== History ==
In 1998, the Missouri Charter School Law was adopted by the Missouri House and Senate and signed into law by the Governor. The law created a path for citizens to come together to operate public schools, but only within the boundaries of the Kansas City Missouri and St. Louis School Districts. Under the law, Charter public schools may be authorized by the two school districts or by various public universities.

University Academy was founded by Tom Bloch, Lynne Brown, and Barnett and Shirley Helzberg. The Missouri Charter Public School Commission (MCPSC) is the school’s charter sponsor.

The school opened its doors with grades 7th, 8th, and 9th grades in 2000, operating in a facility leased from UMKC located at 5605 Troost Avenue. In addition to providing University Academy the initial space for the school to operate and agreeing to sponsor the charter, UMKC supported University Academy in many ways including providing an additional layer of oversight and guidance for both the board and administration.

As a result of the support and generosity of University Academy’s board of directors and the Kansas City community, construction on a new 172,000 square foot facility began in 2004. When the new facility opened in August 2005, enrollment expanded from 300 students in grades 6th-12th to roughly 1,000 students in Kindergarten through 12th grade.

In 2017, the US Department of Education named University Academy's Upper School a National Blue Ribbon School. This award is based on exemplary performance over the last 5 years and is considered the highest honor an American K-12 school can receive. Less than 1/3rd of 1% of the roughly 125,000 eligible K-12 schools receive this award in any year. University Academy is the first charter public school in Missouri and the only high school in Missouri in 2017 to receive this recognition.

In 2017, University Academy also celebrated the opening of its new athletic complex with help from the NFL, Kansas City Chiefs, and LINC.

Since University Academy started graduating seniors in 2004, 100% of its seniors have been accepted to 4 year colleges. In recent years, roughly 50% of University Academy seniors have received an acceptance from a Top 150 college or university as ranked by U.S. News & World Report. University Academy graduates who have been out of high school 6 years or longer have a college completion rate that is more than 5 times the national average for students from lowest quartile income families.

== Notable alumni ==
- Martez Harrison, basketball player for UMKC
