= Victor Snipes =

American basketball player

Personal information
- Born: March 19, 1970 Washington, D.C., U.S.
- Died: April 7, 2007 (aged 37) Kenosha, Wisconsin, U.S.
- Listed height: 6 ft 2 in (1.88 m)
- Listed weight: 165 lb (75 kg)

Career information
- High school: Englewood (Englewood, Chicago); King (Kenwood, Chicago)
- College: Lake Land (1989–1990); Northeastern Illinois (1991–1993)
- NBA draft: 1993: undrafted
- Position: Point guard

Career highlights
- NCAA steals leader (1992)

Victor M. Snipes (legally changed later to Victor M. Turner; March 19, 1970 – April 7, 2007) was an American basketball player. He played for Lake Land College before joining Northeastern Illinois. In 1992, he led NCAA Division I in steals with 3.44 per game. He was arrested in September 1991 for unlawful use of a weapon and was sentenced to one year of court supervision.

Born in Washington, D.C., raised in Chicago, Illinois, and eventually a resident of Kenosha, Wisconsin, Snipes died in Kenosha on April 7, 2007, at age 37. At the time of his death he was a professional welder.
