= Martez Harrison =

American basketball player (born 1993)

Personal information
- Born: October 1, 1993 (age 33) Kansas City, Missouri, U.S.
- Listed height: 5 ft 11 in (1.80 m)
- Listed weight: 200 lb (91 kg)

Career information
- High school: University Academy (Kansas City, Missouri); Brewster Academy (Wolfeboro, New Hampshire)
- College: Kansas City (2013–2016)
- NBA draft: 2017: undrafted
- Playing career: 2017–present
- Position: Point guard

Career history
- 2017: Glasgow Rocks

Career highlights
- AP honorable mention All-American (2015); WAC Player of the Year (2015); First-team All-WAC (2015); WAC Freshman of the Year (2014)

Martez Harrison (born October 1, 1993) is an American basketball player. He played college basketball for the University of Missouri–Kansas City (UMKC). At UMKC, Harrison was the 2015 Western Athletic Conference Player of the Year and was named the school's first All-American in the history of its men's basketball program.

== College career ==
Harrison, a 5'11 point guard, was born and raised in Kansas City, Missouri. Following his high school career at University Academy and a prep season at Brewster Academy in Wolfeboro, New Hampshire, he held no scholarship offers from high-major schools. He decided to attend hometown UMKC as one of head coach Kareem Richardson's first recruits. In his first season, Harrison broke school records in points per game (17.2), assists (114), steals (50), free throws (164) and free throw attempts (257) and was named the Western Athletic Conference (WAC) freshman of the year.

In his sophomore season, Harrison led the Kangaroos to a second-place WAC finish and after averaging 17.5 points and 3.9 assists per game was named first-team all-conference and the WAC Player of the Year. A few weeks later, he was named an honorable mention All-American by the Associated Press, making him the first All-American in program history.

=== Dismissal ===
In mid-November 2016, Harrison was suspended for a domestic assault charge under Title IX. Harrison was suspended indefinitely and was dismissed from the program on December 12, 2016. The charges were later dropped.

== Professional career ==
On September 4, 2017, Harrison signed with the Glasgow Rocks of the British Basketball League.
