= Victor Turner (American football) =

American football coach

Coaching career (HC unless noted)
- 1922: Tuskegee

Head coaching record
- Overall: 1–5–1

Victor Turner was the seventh head football coach at Tuskegee University in Tuskegee, Alabama and he held that position for the 1922 season. His coaching record at Tuskegee was 1–5–1.
