= Knob Creek (South Grand River tributary) =

Stream in the American state of Missouri

Knob Creek is a stream in Cass and Henry counties of central western Missouri. It is a tributary of South Grand River.

The stream headwaters arise just north of Missouri Route 35 about two miles southeast of Garden City and it flows to the southeast generally parallel to Route 35. The stream enters Henry County just southeast of Creighton and continues to the southeast to its confluence with the South Grand about two miles west of Urich. Headwater coordinates are 38°31′53″N 94°08′52″W with an elevation of about 920 feet and the confluence is at 38°27′12″N 94°02′10″W at an elevation of 728 feet.
