= Kansas City Roos men's basketball =

2026-27 Kansas City Roos men's basketball team
- University: University of Missouri–Kansas City
- First season: 1969
- Head coach: Mark Turgeon (1st season)
- Location: Kansas City, Missouri
- Arena: Municipal Auditorium (capacity: 7,300)
- Conference: Summit League
- Nickname: Roos
- Colors: Blue and gold
- All-time record: Overall: 753–883 (.460); NCAA (Division I): 479–675 (.415); NAIA: 274–208 (.568)

Uniforms
Home	Away

The Kansas City Roos men's basketball team represents the University of Missouri–Kansas City in Kansas City, Missouri. Starting off in the National Association of Intercollegiate Athletics (NAIA), the Roos moved to the National Collegiate Athletic Association (NCAA) Division I level in 1987 as an independent. They played in the Mid-Continent Conference/Summit League from 1994-2013 until they moved to the Western Athletic Conference (WAC). They returned to the Summit League in 2020 after seven seasons in the WAC. The team has never played in the NCAA Division I men's basketball tournament. The Roos are led by head coach Mark Turgeon.

The team plays at the historical Municipal Auditorium in downtown Kansas City, which has hosted the most NCAA Division I men's basketball Final Fours. They have previously played at Swinney Recreation Center on campus in 2013–14 and 2019–2026.

The team made its first Division I postseason appearance in the 2017 College Basketball Invitational. They defeated Green Bay 92–82 at home in the first round then lost to Wyoming 72–61 on the road in the quarterfinals. They have won two in-season tournament championships, the River City Classic in 1991 and the Chicago Invitational Challenge (Lower Bracket) in 2011. They were the Runner-Up of The Islands of the Bahamas Showcase in 2019 and the Gulf Coast Showcase in 2022. They made the 1977 NAIA basketball tournament, losing to Grand Valley State in the first round 94–88.

The Roos’ conference rivals include Omaha and Oral Roberts. Other local and historical rivals include Chicago State, Lindenwood, Missouri, Missouri State, Saint Louis, Southeast Missouri State, and Western Illinois. They have won the last two meetings against Missouri in 2014 and 2021.

== History ==
NAIA Era (1969–86)

The Kangaroos were a formidable NAIA program as they had 10 winning seasons and four 20-win seasons in an 18-year stretch. They had rivalries with local Kansas City teams such as Rockhurst and William Jewell. In 1977, they finished 21–7 (.750) with their only NAIA Tournament appearance. In 1984–85, they finished a program best 27–9 (.750). Darrell Corwin coached the Kangaroos from 1973 until 1980 and is the all-time winningest coach in program history at 118–78 (.602); Bruce Carrier coached the Kangaroos from 1983 until 1985 and has the best winning percentage in program history at .694 (50–22).

Lee Hunt Era (1987–96)

The Kangaroos made the move to NCAA Division I in 1987 as an Independent with head coach Lee Hunt leading the way. They enjoyed three consecutive winning seasons from 1991 to 1993. In the 1991–92 season, they finished an NCAA D-I program-best 21–7 (.750) and won the River City Classic. Hunt retired two seasons after the Kangaroos joined the Mid–Continent Conference (one of his stated goals for the athletics department was to secure a conference membership). Hunt is the winningest coach in its D–I program history with a 113–135 record (.456) and his nine-season tenure is the longest in program history. Both Ronnie Schmitz (24) and NBA first-round draft selection Tony Dumas (23) from this era have had their jersey numbers retired.

Bob Sundvold Era (1996–2000)

Following the retirement of Hunt, the Kangaroos hired Sundvold (who was the head coach at NCAA Division II Central Missouri State). The team initially scuffled during the transition to Sundvold. His best season was his last in 1999–2000 with a 16–13 overall record and a second-place finish in the conference.

Dean Demopoulos Era (2000–01)

In Demopoulos's lone season in 2000–01, the Kangaroos went 14–16 overall and 9–7 in conference play. He resigned following that season to become an NBA assistant coach with the Seattle SuperSonics on Nate McMillan's staff.

Rich Zvosec Era (2001–07)

Zvosec was an assistant coach on Demopoulos' staff and was promoted to head coach. He made an early impression as the Kangaroos head coach going 18–11 in his first season in 2001–02. In 2004–05, the Kangaroos went 16–12 overall, 12–4 conference and a second-place finish. The Kangaroos had three winning seasons and another .500 season under Zvosec with an overall record of 84–91 (.480). The most notable player of this era is Michael Watson, the program's all-time leading scorer. His jersey number (22) is retired by the Kangaroos.

Matt Brown Era (2007–13)

In Matt Brown's six seasons as head coach, the Kangaroos had only one winning season and an overall record of just 60–122 (.330), the worst winning percentage for any coach in the entire program history (NAIA and NCAA). Brown's lone winning season season came in 2010-11 when the Kangaroos finished 16–14 overall and 9–9 in conference play. They won the 2011 Chicago Invitational Challenge (Lower Bracket) the following season.

Kareem Richardson Era (2013–19)

In 2013, the Kangaroos signed Richardson as he was coming off a national title as an assistant coach at Louisville under Rick Pitino. Richardson got busy on bringing in local talent, including eventual 2015 WAC Player of Year Martez Harrison. In 2014-15 the Roos finished 14–19 overall but 8–6 in the WAC, good for second place. In 2016–17, the Kangaroos finished 18–17, 8–6 WAC and made their first ever NCAA Division I postseason appearance. They were victorious over Green Bay, 92–82, in the College Basketball Invitational (CBI) first round and were defeated at Wyoming, 72–61, in the quarterfinal round.

Billy Donlon Era (2019–22)

Billy Donlon was hired by the Roos in 2019 following success as head coach at Wright State and Big Ten assistant coaching experience at multiple schools (including his most recent stint at Northwestern). In his first season, the Roos went 16–14 overall, 8–7 WAC and fourth place in the WAC and were The Islands of the Bahamas Showcase runner-up. In 2021–22, the Roos finished 19–12, 12–6 Summit League and a third-place finish for their best record since the 2001–02 season. Donlon has the highest overall winning percentage in its D-I program history at .541 (46–39).

Marvin Menzies Era (2022–2026)

The Roos hired Marvin Menzies in 2022, their former conference foe in the WAC when he coached at New Mexico State. They struggled in his first season going 11–21 and 7–11 Summit League, but were the Gulf Coast Showcase Runner-Up. They bounced back in 2023–24 finishing 16–16, 10–6 Summit League and a second place conference finish. The Roos were picked as preseason conference champions in 2024–25 for the first time and were ranked No. 22 in the College Insider Mid Major Top 25.

On January 12, 2026, following a 4–14 start, the University announced that Menzies would not be retained after the conclusion of the 2025–26 season. Menzies would remain on the bench and finish out the schedule.

Mark Turgeon Era (2026–present)

On February 1, 2026, the university announced that Mark Turgeon, who led four programs (Jacksonville State, Wichita State, Texas A&M, Maryland) to an accumulative ten NCAA and four NIT appearances over twenty-three plus seasons (from 1998 to 2021), would replace Menzies as head coach beginning with the 2026–27 campaign.

== Athletic brand names ==
- Kansas City Kangaroos (1954–1963) — At the time, the university was known as the University of Kansas City (short form KCU).
- Missouri–Kansas City Kangaroos (1963–2019) — KCU joined the University of Missouri system in 1963, adopting the institutional name of University of Missouri–Kansas City (short form UMKC) at that time.
- Kansas City Roos (2019–present)

== Season–by–season results ==
=== NAIA ===
Record table
Season	Coach	Overall	Conference	Standing	Postseason
Bill Ross (National Association of Intercollegiate Athletics) (1969–1973)
1969–70	Bill Ross	11–13	—	—	
1970–71	Bill Ross	14–16	—	—	
1971–72	Bill Ross	19–8	—	—	
1972–73	Bill Ross	15–11	—	—	
Darrell Corwin (NAIA) (1973–1980)
1973–74	Darrell Corwin	15–12	—	—	
1974–75	Darrell Corwin	21–7	—	—	
1975–76	Darrell Corwin	16–10	—	—	
1976–77	Darrell Corwin	21–9	—	—	NAIA First Round
1977–78	Darrell Corwin	15–15	—	—	
1978–79	Darrell Corwin	17–11	—	—	
1979–80	Darrell Corwin	13–14	—	—	
Darrell Corwin:		118–78 (.602)	—		
Byron Lehman (NAIA) (1980–1983)
1980–81	Byron Lehman	7–16	—	—	
1981–82	Byron Lehman	11–13	—	—	
1982–83	Byron Lehman	10–16	—	—	
Byron Lehman:		28–45 (.384)	—		
Bruce Carrier (NAIA) (1983–1985)
1983–84	Bruce Carrier	23–13	—	—	
1984–85	Bruce Carrier	27–9	—	—	
Bruce Carrier:		50–22 (.694)	—		
Bill Ross (NAIA) (1985–1986)
1985–86	Bill Ross	19–15	—	—	
Bill Ross:		78–63 (.553)	—		
Total:		274–208 (.568)	—		
National champion Postseason invitational champion Conference regular season champion Conference regular season and conference tournament champion Division regular season champion Division regular season and conference tournament champion Conference tournament champion

=== NCAA ===
Record table
Season	Coach	Overall	Conference	Standing	Postseason
Lee Hunt (Independent) (1987–1994)
1987—88	First	9–18	–	—	
1988—89	Second	9–18	–	—	
1989—90	Third	13–15	–	—	
1990—91	Fourth	15–14	–	—	
1991—92	Fifth	21–7	–	—	
1992—93	Sixth	15–12	–	—	
1993—94	Seventh	12–17	–	—	
Lee Hunt (Mid–Continent Conference) (1994–1996)
1994—95	Eighth	7–19	7–11	7th	
1995—96	Ninth	12–15	10–8	T—3rd	
Lee Hunt:		113–135 (.456)	17–19 (.472)		
Bob Sundvold (Mid–Continent Conference) (1996–2000)
1996—97	First	10–17	7–9	6th	
1997—98	Second	9–18	7–9	6th	
1998—99	Third	8–22	3–11	T—7th	
1999—2000	Fourth	16–13	10–6	T—2nd	
Bob Sundvold:		43–70 (.381)	27–35 (.435)		
Dean Demopoulos (Mid–Continent Conference) (2000–2001)
2000—01	First	14–16	9–7	4th	
Dean Demopoulos:		14–16 (.467)	9–7 (.563)		
Rich Zvosec (Mid–Continent Conference) (2001–2007)
2001—02	First	18–11	7–7	5th	
2002—03	Second	9–20	7–7	5th	
2003—04	Third	15–14	9–7	T—5th	
2004—05	Fourth	16–12	12–4	2nd	
2005—06	Fifth	14–14	11–5	3rd	
2006—07	Sixth	12–20	6–8	T—5th	
Rich Zvosec:		84–91 (.480)	52–38 (.578)		
Matt Brown (The Summit League) (2007–2013)
2007—08	First	9–21	4–12	8th	
2008—09	Second	5–24	1–15	10th	
2009—10	Third	12–18	6–12	T—7th	
2010—11	Fourth	16–14	9–9	6th	
2011—12	Fifth	10–21	4–14	10th	
2012—13	Sixth	8–24	5–11	T—7th	
Matt Brown:		60–122 (.330)	29–73 (.284)		
Kareem Richardson (Western Athletic Conference) (2013–2019)
2013—14	First	10–20	7–9	T—5th	
2014—15	Second	14–19	8–6	T—2nd	
2015—16	Third	12–19	4–10	T—6th	
2016—17	Fourth	18–17	8–6	4th	CBI Quarterfinal
2017—18	Fifth	10–22	5–9	T—6th	
2018—19	Sixth	11–21	6–10	T—7th	
Kareem Richardson:		75–118 (.389)	38–50 (.432)		
Billy Donlon (Western Athletic Conference) (2019–2020)
2019—20	First	16–14	8–7	4th	
Billy Donlon (The Summit League) (2020–2022)
2020—21	Second	11–13	7–7	T—5th	
2021—22	Third	19–12	12–6	T—3rd	
Billy Donlon:		46–39 (.541)	27–20 (.574)		
Marvin Menzies (The Summit League) (2022–2026)
2022—23	First	11–21	7–11	T—6th	
2023—24	Second	16–16	10–6	T—2nd	
2024—25	Third	13–20	4–12	8th	
2025—26	Fourth	4–27	1–15	9th	
Marvin Menzies:		44–84 (.344)	22–44 (.333)		
Mark Turgeon (The Summit League) (2026–present)
2026—27	First				
Mark Turgeon:		0–0 (–)	0–0 (–)		
Total:		479–675 (.415)	221–286 (.436)		
National champion Postseason invitational champion Conference regular season champion Conference regular season and conference tournament champion Division regular season champion Division regular season and conference tournament champion Conference tournament champion

NOTE: the records above reflect the official won-loss recorded; the following revisions occurred that adjusted actual on-court results ~
Lee Hunt

- A December 21, 1991 defeat at Texas–Pan American (56–55) was subsequently changed to a victory due to a forfeit (the 1991–92 on-court record was 20–8 prior to the sanction).

Matt Brown

- The Summit League vacated (as opposed to forfeited) the victories of February 16, 2008 (South Dakota State, 78–73) and February 28, 2008 (IPFW, 75–57), resulting in neither a loss or win being reflected in the official league and overall record for those games (the 2007–08 on-court record was 11–21 (6–12) prior to the sanction).
- The Summit League vacated (as opposed to forfeited) the victories of January 15, 2009 (South Dakota State, 69–67) and February 19, 2009 (Centenary, 61–59), resulting in neither a loss or win being reflected in the official league and overall record for those games (the 2008–09 on-court record was 7–24 (3–15) prior to the sanction).

== Postseason ==
=== CBI ===
The Roos (then nicknamed Kangaroos) appeared in one College Basketball Invitational (CBI). Their record is 1–1.

Year	Round	Opponent	Result
2017	First Round; Quarterfinals	Green Bay at Wyoming	W 92–82; L 61–72

=== NAIA Tournament results ===
The Kangaroos appeared in one NAIA Tournament. Their record is 0–1.

Year	Round	Opponent	Result
1977	First Round	Grand Valley State	L 88–94

== Former Kangaroos in the NBA ==
- Tony Dumas
- Trey McKinney-Jones

== Former Kangaroos in international leagues ==
- Jordan Giles, Pyrintö (Korisliiga)
- Brandon McKissic, Rapla KK (Korvpalli Meistriliiga)
- Deshon Taylor, Cairns Taipans (NBL)
- Rob Whitfield, Urunday (Uruguay Metropolitan League)
