= Ridgeway High School (Memphis, Tennessee) =

Public high school in Memphis, Tennessee, United States

Coordinates: 35.089170°N 89.858782°W

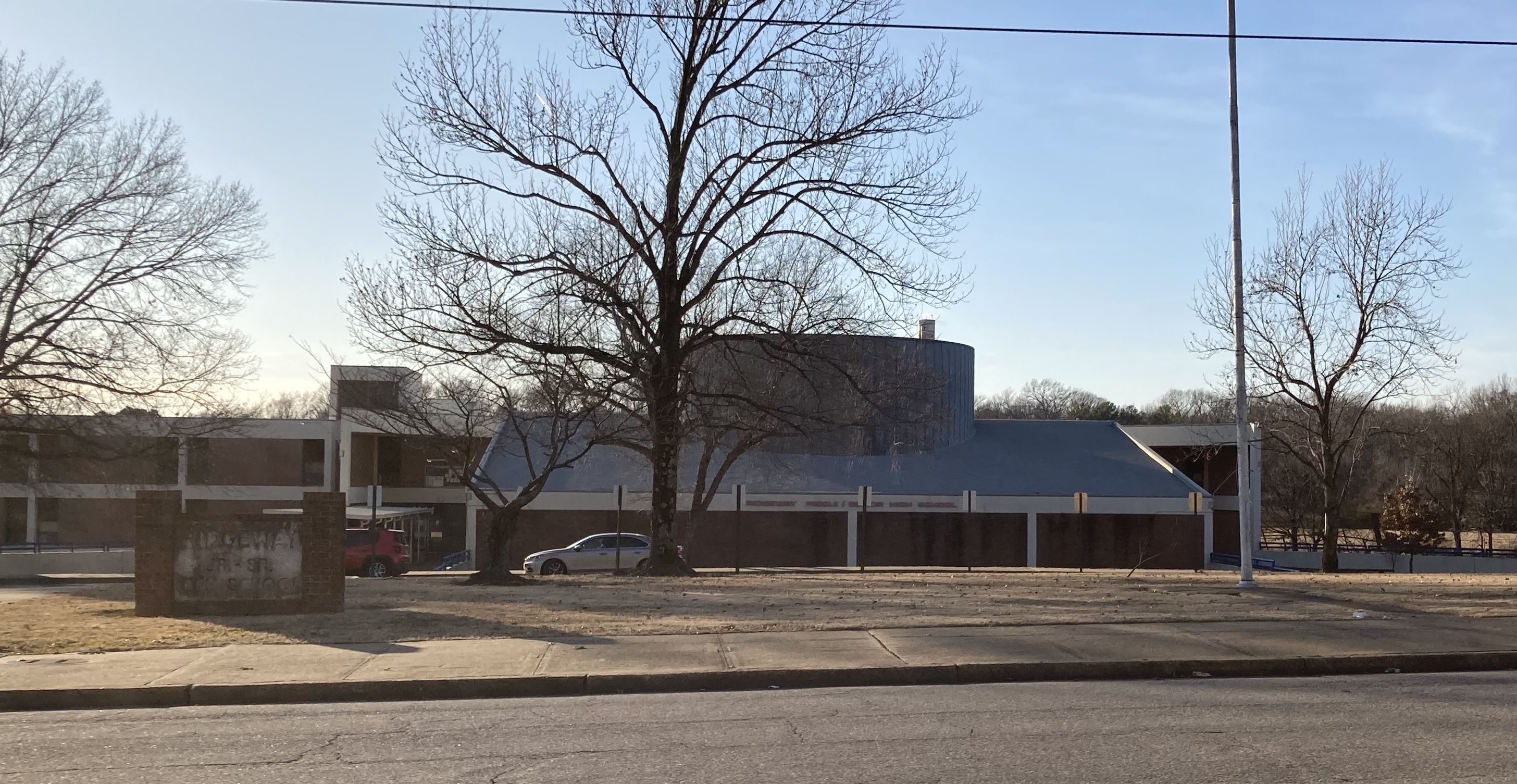

Location
- 2009 Ridgeway Rd; Memphis, Tennessee 38119; United States

Information
- Type: Public high school
- Established: 1971
- School district: Memphis-Shelby County Schools
- Principal: Phillip Nelson
- Teaching staff: 43.10 (FTE)
- Grades: 9-12
- Enrollment: 805 (2023–2024)
- Student to teacher ratio: 18.68
- Colors: Navy and orange
- Mascot: Roadrunners
- Website: https://schools.scsk12.org/ridgeway-hs

Ridgeway High School is a public high school in east Memphis, Tennessee, United States, and is operated in the Memphis-Shelby County Schools district.

== History ==
Ridgeway High opened in 1971 as an original member of the Memphis City Schools system, hosting students from grades 7–12. The first class of graduates was in 1973 with approximately 175 students. Ridgeway High School now only houses grades 9–12 with the recent addition of Ridgeway Middle School in 2001. In August 2008 the 9th grade moved to a separate Ridgeway Ninth Grade Freshmen Academy. Ridgeway offers two basic academic programs: the Standard Program and the Honors Program.

To take courses in the latter program, students must achieve certain scores on standardized tests, maintain certain grades, and meet certain course requirements. Ridgeway is known for its high scores and achievements in the city and the state. Ridgeway is considered to be a top school in the school system. Ridgeway is one of the few schools in the school system to constantly pass all required levels by the No Child Left Behind act. Ridgeway was also Best of Preps in 1987 and for seven years running (1998–2005) in the Greater Memphis area.

Ridgeway has recently added two new academic programs to their two basic academic programs: Advanced Placement (AP) and the International Baccalaureate Program (IB).

== Extra-curricular activities ==
Ridgeway's boys basketball teams have won state titles. Ridgeway also has a girls basketball team, soccer teams (M/F), promising track and field teams (M/F), baseball/softball teams (M/F), a football team (M; though there has been at least one girl to play), a bowling team (M/F), a golf team (M/F), a volleyball team (F), cross-country teams (M/F), a tennis team (Co-ed), a swim team (Co-ed), and a wrestling team (M). Ridgeway's football team was featured in a National Football League commercial for the 2018–19 NFL playoffs.

Ridgeway has a school newspaper (channel orange) created by the Creative Writing Class and an annual yearbook (The Chaparral) created by the Yearbook class. Ridgeway has many active clubs in areas including foreign language, mathematics, science, business, government, music, art, community service, religion, and more. There is an active Student Council, a jazz band, Model United Nations team, knowledge bowl team, quiz bowl team, and debate team. Ridgeway Roadrunners hold positions in the All-West Tennessee Band, Orchestra, and Choir. Ridgeway also have an extensive theatre program producing both a fall and spring show every year with the help of the band and choir departments. Ridgeway also hosts an annual Fine Arts festival put on by the students with the help of the PTO.

The school also has a few special programs including Facing History and Ourselves, Ridgeway – University of Tennessee summer internships, PLATO course recovery, and Gateway exam tutoring.

== Demographics ==
The enrollment for grades 9–12 is roughly 1,500. 77% of the student body is African American, 17% is White, 5% is Hispanic, and 1% makes up the rest of the population. The promotion rate for the school is 96.5%, and the average class size is 30 students. 42% of the teachers are African American, 56% of the teachers are White, 2% of the teachers are Hispanic and one faculty member is Asian American. Another Faculty member is a Nigerian.

== Uniforms ==
All Ridgeway students are required to wear school uniforms.

== Awards ==
=== Theater ===
Year	Show	Award	Category	Nominee	Result
2010	Footloose	Orpheum High School Musical Award	Best Musical Direction	Dr. Jeff Brewer	Nominated
2010	Footloose	Orpheum High School Musical Award	Best Ensemble	Ensemble Cast of Footloose	Nominated
2010	Footloose	Orpheum High School Musical Award	Best Actor	Prentiss Mouton as Reverend Shaw	Won
2011	Aida	Orpheum High School Musical Award	Outstanding Music Direction	Jacob Craig	Nominated
2011	Aida	Orpheum High School Musical Award	Best Supporting Actress	Rayna Holmes as Nehebka	Nominated
2011	Aida	Orpheum High School Musical Award	Outstanding Achievement in Musical Theatre	Cast, Crew, & Creative Team of Aida	Won
2011	Aida	Orpheum High School Musical Award	Best Actress	Breyannah Tillman as Aida	Won
2012	Once on this Island	Orpheum High School Musical Award	Outstanding Chorus	Chours of "Once on this Island"'	Nominated
2012	Once on this Island	Orpheum High School Musical Award	Outstanding Small Ensemble	Ensemble of "Once on this Island"'	Won
2012	Once on this Island	Orpheum High School Musical Award	Outstanding Costume Design Tier I		Nominated
2012	Once on this Island	Orpheum High School Musical Award	Outstanding Supporting Actor	Gabriel Bailey as Papa Ge	Won
2012	Once on this Island	Orpheum High School Musical Award	Outstanding Supporting Actress	Mariatu Okonofua as Mama Euralie	Nominated

== Notable alumni ==
- Derrick Byars (2002), professional basketball player
- Josh Jasper (2006), professional football placekicker
- Sampson Carter (2009), professional basketball player
- Tarik Black (2010), professional basketball player
- Jalen Crutcher (2017), professional basketball player
- Liz Dixon (2018), professional basketball player
