= Tony Dumas =

American basketball player (born 1972)

Personal information
- Born: August 25, 1972 (age 54) Chicago, Illinois, U.S.
- Listed height: 6 ft 6 in (1.98 m)
- Listed weight: 190 lb (86 kg)

Career information
- High school: Millington (Millington, Tennessee)
- College: Kansas City (1990–1994)
- NBA draft: 1994: 1st round, 19th overall pick
- Drafted by: Dallas Mavericks
- Playing career: 1994–2001
- Position: Shooting guard
- Number: 7, 27

Career history
- 1994–1996: Dallas Mavericks
- 1996–1997: Phoenix Suns
- 1997–1998: Cleveland Cavaliers
- 1998: La Crosse Bobcats
- 1999: Sporting Athens
- 2001: Vip Rimini

Career NBA statistics
- Points: 1,140 (7.3 ppg)
- Rebounds: 198 (1.3 rpg)
- Assists: 186 (1.2 apg)
- Stats at NBA.com
- Stats at Basketball Reference

Tony Dumas (born August 25, 1972) is an American former professional basketball player. He played four seasons in the NBA, mainly for the Mavericks. He did have two brief stints with the Phoenix Suns and Cleveland Cavaliers.

== College career ==
Born in Chicago, Illinois, Dumas played collegiately at the University of Missouri-Kansas City (UMKC), whose athletic program is now known as the Kansas City Roos. He was the all-time leading scorer in UMKC history upon the completion of his career, with 2,459 career points. His senior season, he finished seventh in the NCAA in scoring at 27.0 points per game. He is also the only player in Kansas City Roos history to be drafted into the NBA and the first Dallas Maverick to participate in the NBA All-Star Weekend's Dunk-Championship where he finished 6th place.

In May 2021 with a 3.9 G.P.A. Tony returned to The University of Missouri-Kansas City (2021) and completed his bachelor's degree in Science with a Minor in Communication Studies. Tony also received the UMKC Chancellor's Historically Under-Represented Minority Award and Scholarship at the University of Missouri-Kansas City's Bloch business school and is currently seeking his Executive master's degree in Business Administration (MBA). Dumas is the father of Tony George Dumas.

== Professional career ==
=== Dallas Mavericks (1994–1996) ===
Dumas was selected by the Dallas Mavericks in the 1st round (19th overall) of the 1994 NBA draft. Dumas participated in the 1995 NBA Slam Dunk Contest, finishing last (6th) after three unsuccessful dunks in the first round, injuring his right knee in the process.

His best year as a pro came during the 1995–96 season as a member of the Mavericks, appearing in 67 games (12 starts) and averaging 11.6 ppg, including a 39-point effort against the Suns on January 12, 1996. After the impressive 1995–1996 season, his play regressed and he wasn't able to return to form after. The most he averaged in a season after that was 3.6 points per game, although he did have a season high 15 point game in a 103–84 loss to the Detroit Pistons in the beginning of the 1996–1997 season.

=== Phoenix Suns (1996–1997) ===
On December 26, 1996, Dumas was traded by the Dallas Mavericks with Jason Kidd and Loren Meyer to the Phoenix Suns for Sam Cassell, Michael Finley, A.C. Green and a 1998 2nd round draft pick (Greg Buckner was later selected). Dumas was a part of the 1996–1997 Suns team that managed to reach the playoffs. Due to injury Dumas played a total of 6 games in that season as the Suns reached the playoffs with a 40 win team and faced the Seattle SuperSonics in the first round. Despite being out-talented, the Suns played well in the series and forced the SuperSonics to 5 games before ultimately falling short. Dumas didn't receive much playing time in the playoffs however.

=== Cleveland Cavaliers (1997–1998) ===
On October 1, 1997, Dumas was a part of a large transaction. As part of a 3-team trade, Dumas was traded by the Phoenix Suns with Wesley Person to the Cleveland Cavaliers; the Cleveland Cavaliers traded a 2005 1st round draft pick (Sean May was later selected) to the Phoenix Suns; the Denver Nuggets traded Antonio McDyess to the Phoenix Suns; and the Phoenix Suns traded a 1998 1st round draft pick (Tyronn Lue was later selected), a 1999 1st round draft pick (James Posey was later selected), a 2000 2nd round draft pick (Dan McClintock was later selected), a 2001 1st round draft pick (Joseph Forte was later selected) and a 2002 2nd round draft pick (Rod Grizzard was later selected) to the Denver Nuggets.

He averaged 2.0 points per game and only received 6.7 minutes of playing time. He also only played 7 games in the season with the Cavaliers. On January 29, 1998, the Cavaliers waived Dumas.

=== Retirement from the NBA ===
Dumas retired from the NBA shortly after being released by the Cleveland Cavaliers.

He continued playing in different basketball associations like the Continental Basketball Association (CBA) in 1998, where he played for La Crosse Bobcats. In 2001, he moved to Greece playing for Sporting BC. In 2001, he played for Rimini in Italy.
