= Creighton, Missouri =

- City
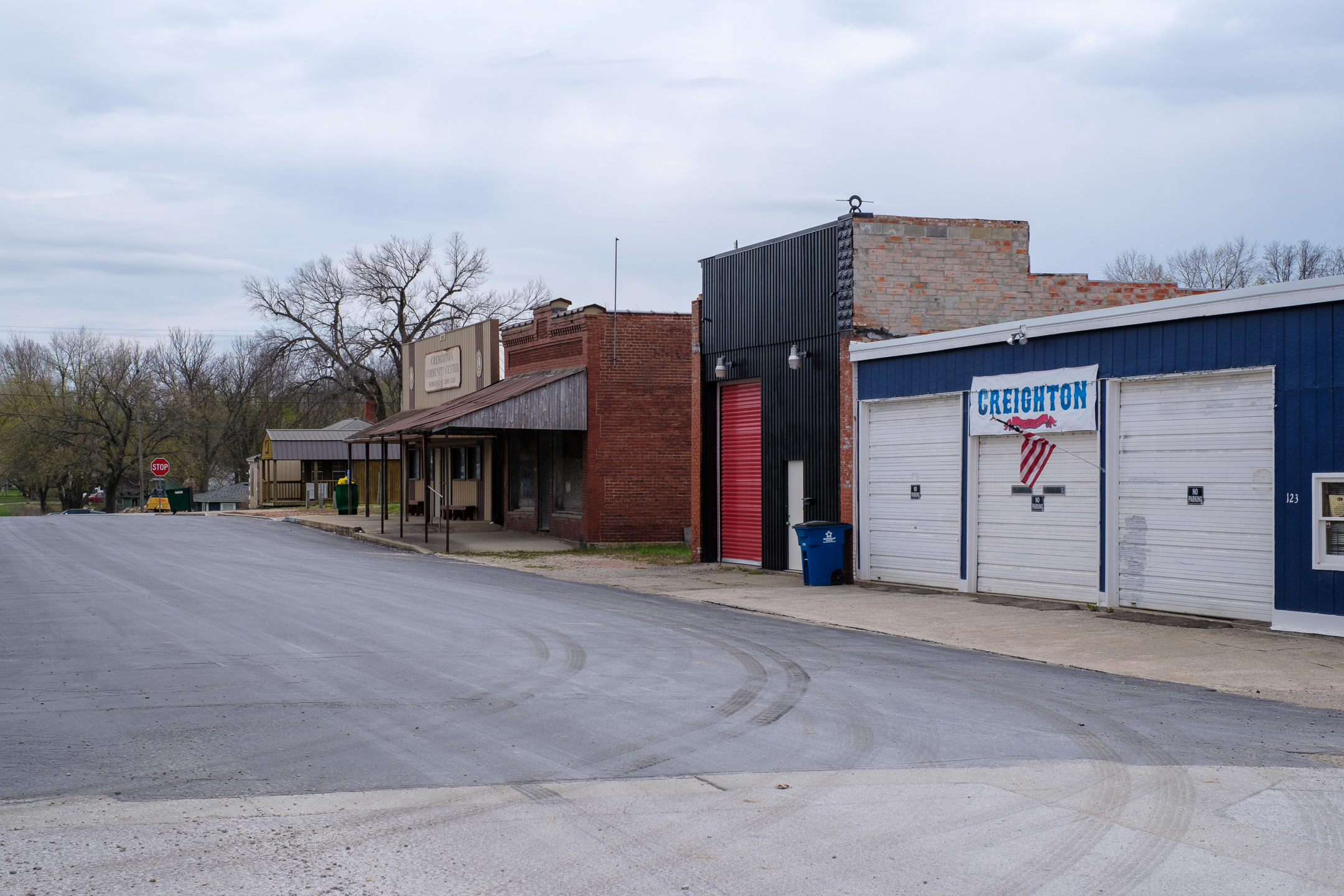

- Location of Creighton, Missouri
- Coordinates: 38°29′48″N 94°04′20″W
- Country: United States
- State: Missouri
- County: Cass

Area
  - Total: 0.34 sq mi (0.89 km^{2})
  - Land: 0.34 sq mi (0.89 km^{2})
  - Water: 0 sq mi (0.00 km^{2})
- Elevation: 801 ft (244 m)

Population (2020)
  - Total: 327
  - Density: 948.0/sq mi (366.04/km^{2})
- Time zone: UTC-6 (Central (CST))
  - Summer (DST): UTC-5 (CDT)
- ZIP code: 64739
- Area code: 660
- FIPS code: 29-17164
- GNIS feature ID: 2393667
- Website: cityofcreightonmo.com

Creighton is a city in Cass County, Missouri, United States. The population was 327 at the 2020 census. It is 57 miles south southeast of the Kansas City metropolitan area.

== Community ==
- Public education in Creighton is administered by the Sherwood Cass R-VIII School District, which operates one elementary school, one middle school, and Sherwood High School. All three schools share 1 facility housing roughly 900 students. The school is located on the North side of MO-7 on Marksmen Ln. across from downtown Creighton.
- Creighton maintains one USPS full service location as well as a City Hall building for public works and city documents.
- The compact, rural hub has been home to a number of small businesses for well over a century. The oldest continually operating business is Sherwood Community Bank, and it was originally incorporated in 1902 as Farmer's & Merchant's (of Creighton).

== History ==
Creighton was platted in 1885, and named after John B. Creighton, a pioneer citizen. A post office called Creighton has been in operation since 1887.

== Geography ==
According to the United States Census Bureau, the city has a total area of 0.35 square miles (0.91 km^{2}), all land.

Black Oak Creek and Knob Creek flow nearby.

== Demographics ==
Historical population
Census	Pop.	Note	%±
1890	308		—
1900	360		16.9%
1910	400		11.1%
1920	335		−16.2%
1930	289		−13.7%
1940	272		−5.9%
1950	269		−1.1%
1960	228		−15.2%
1970	294		28.9%
1980	301		2.4%
1990	289		−4.0%
2000	322		11.4%
2010	349		8.4%
2020	327		−6.3%
U.S. Decennial Census

=== Racial and ethnic composition ===
Creighton city, Missouri – Racial and ethnic composition Note: the US Census treats Hispanic/Latino as an ethnic category. This table excludes Latinos from the racial categories and assigns them to a separate category. Hispanics/Latinos may be of any race.
Race / Ethnicity (NH = Non-Hispanic)	Pop 2000	Pop 2010	Pop 2020	% 2000	% 2010	% 2020
White alone (NH)	317	327	293	98.45%	93.70%	89.60%
Black or African American alone (NH)	0	7	4	0.00%	2.01%	1.22%
Native American or Alaska Native alone (NH)	0	6	2	0.00%	1.72%	0.61%
Asian alone (NH)	0	0	0	0.00%	0.00%	0.00%
Native Hawaiian or Pacific Islander alone (NH)	0	0	0	0.00%	0.00%	0.00%
Other race alone (NH)	0	0	0	0.00%	0.00%	0.00%
Mixed race or Multiracial (NH)	3	2	15	0.93%	0.57%	4.59%
Hispanic or Latino (any race)	2	7	13	0.62%	2.01%	3.98%
Total	322	349	327	100.00%	100.00%	100.00%

=== 2020 census ===
As of the census of 2020, there were 327 people, 139 households, and 94 families living in the city. The population density was 997.1 inhabitants per square mile (385.0/km^{2}). There were 143 housing units at an average density of 457.1 per square mile (176.5/km^{2}). The racial makeup of the city was 91.7% White, 1.2% African American, .6% Native Hawaiian or Pacific Islander,1.7% Native American, and 5.5% from two or more races. Hispanic or Latino of any race were 3.9% of the population.

There were 139 households, of which 20.9% had children under the age of 18 living with them, 38.1% were married couples living together, 30.2% had a female householder with no husband present, 19.4% had a male householder with no wife present, and 12.3% were non-families. 29.6% of all households were made up of individuals, and 11.3% had someone living alone who was 65 years of age or older. The average household size was 2.46 and the average family size was 3.02.

The median age in the city was 35.2 years. 20.9% of residents were under the age of 18; 13.3% were between the ages of 18 and 24; 14.6% were from 25 to 44; 26.9% were from 45 to 64; and 14.7% were 65 years of age or older. The gender makeup of the city was 46.4% male and 53.6% female.

=== 2010 census ===
As of the census of 2010, there were 349 people, 142 households, and 94 families living in the city. The population density was 997.1 inhabitants per square mile (385.0/km^{2}). There were 160 housing units at an average density of 457.1 per square mile (176.5/km^{2}). The racial makeup of the city was 95.7% White, 2.0% African American, 1.7% Native American, and 0.6% from two or more races. Hispanic or Latino of any race were 2.0% of the population.

There were 142 households, of which 35.9% had children under the age of 18 living with them, 47.9% were married couples living together, 9.9% had a female householder with no husband present, 8.5% had a male householder with no wife present, and 33.8% were non-families. 29.6% of all households were made up of individuals, and 11.3% had someone living alone who was 65 years of age or older. The average household size was 2.46 and the average family size was 3.02.

The median age in the city was 33.9 years. 25.8% of residents were under the age of 18; 9.5% were between the ages of 18 and 24; 26.6% were from 25 to 44; 25.2% were from 45 to 64; and 12.9% were 65 years of age or older. The gender makeup of the city was 48.7% male and 51.3% female.

=== 2000 census ===
As of the census of 2000, there were 322 people, 128 households, and 83 families living in the city. The population density was 1,086.7 inhabitants per square mile (419.6/km^{2}). There were 138 housing units at an average density of 465.7 per square mile (179.8/km^{2}). The racial makeup of the city was 98.76% White, 0.31% from other races, and 0.93% from two or more races. Hispanic or Latino of any race were 0.62% of the population.

There were 128 households, out of which 38.3% had children under the age of 18 living with them, 53.1% were married couples living together, 8.6% had a female householder with no husband present, and 34.4% were non-families. 31.3% of all households were made up of individuals, and 17.2% had someone living alone who was 65 years of age or older. The average household size was 2.52 and the average family size was 3.17.

In the city the population was spread out, with 31.1% under the age of 18, 5.9% from 18 to 24, 32.3% from 25 to 44, 16.8% from 45 to 64, and 14.0% who were 65 years of age or older. The median age was 35 years. For every 100 females, there were 105.1 males. For every 100 females age 18 and over, there were 101.8 males.

The median income for a household in the city was $41,071, and the median income for a family was $48,750. Males had a median income of $41,000 versus $19,479 for females. The per capita income for the city was $20,369. About 8.9% of families and 12.9% of the population were below the poverty line, including 11.7% of those under age 18 and 19.5% of those age 65 or over.

== Education ==
It is in the Sherwood Cass R-VIII School District.

Metropolitan Community College has the Sherwood Cass school district area in its service area, but not its in-district taxation area.
