= Dickens Athletic Center =

Multi-purpose arena in Chicago, Illinois

Coordinates: 41.717948°N 87.608843°W

The Jacoby D. Dickens Physical Education and Athletics Center is a 2,500-seat multi-purpose arena in Chicago, Illinois. It was originally named the CSU Athletics Building until 1995.

It was home to the Chicago State University Cougars basketball teams until late 2006, when it was replaced by the Emil and Patricia Jones Convocation Center. It currently hosts the school's volleyball program.
