= Northeastern Illinois Golden Eagles men's basketball =

Northeastern Illinois Golden Eagles
- University: Northeastern Illinois University
- Head coach: Rees Johnson
- Location: Chicago, Illinois
- Arena: Physical Education Complex (capacity: 2,200)
- Conference: Mid-Continent Conference; D1 Division
- Nickname: Golden Eagles
- Colors: Gold and Royal Blue

Northeastern Illinois Golden Eagles men's basketball formerly represented Northeastern Illinois University in intercollegiate men's basketball. The team participated in NCAA Division I beginning with the 1990–91 season.

The squad briefly joined the East Coast Conference before moving to the Mid-Continent Conference from 1994 to 1998. At the end of the 1997–98 academic year, the university's administration disbanded the athletic department.

Leading players of this era included high-scoring guard Reggie Smith (1992–94), imposing center Monte O'Quinn (1992–96). Another guard, Andrell Hoard (1995–97), won the 1997 ESPN National Slam Dunk Championship. Guard Victor Snipes (1991–93) led NCAA Division I in steals per game as sophomore in 1991–92.

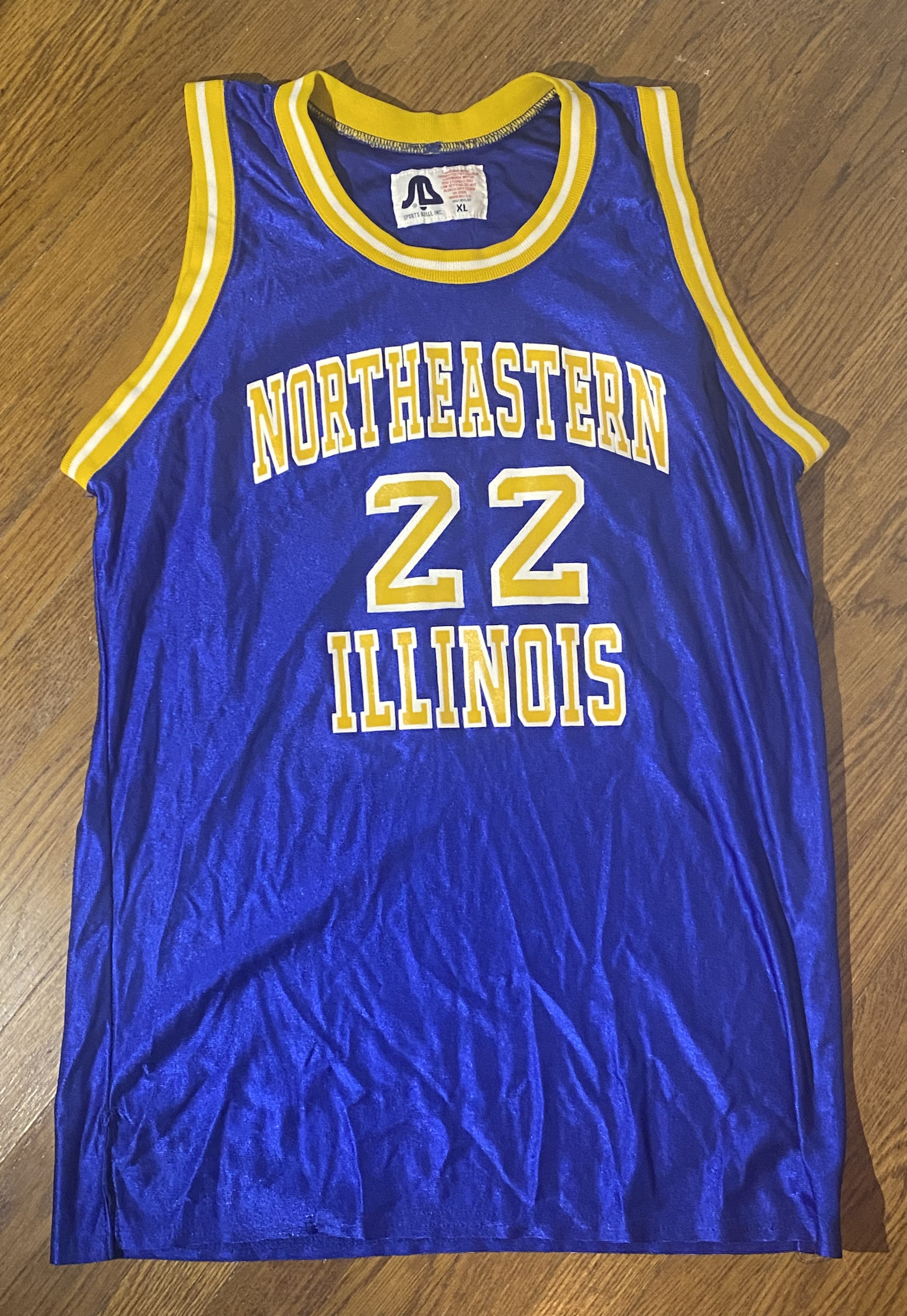
1990s #22 jersey

== Record by year ==
Statistics overview
Season	Coach	Overall	Conference	Standing	Postseason
Rees Johnson (Division II Independent) (1988–1990)
1988–89	Rees Johnson	11–17			—
1989–90	Rees Johnson	6–21			—
Rees Johnson (Division I Independent) (1990–1993)
1990–91	Rees Johnson	2–25			—
1991–92	Rees Johnson	8–20			—
1992–93	Rees Johnson	11–16			—
Rees Johnson (East Coast Conference) (1993–1994)
1993–94	Rees Johnson	17–11	4–1	2nd	ECC Tournament Runners-Up
Rees Johnson (Mid-Continent Conference) (1994–1998)
1994–95	Rees Johnson	4–22	2–16	10th	—
1995–96	Rees Johnson	14–13	10–8	T–3rd	—
1996–97	Rees Johnson	16–12	8–8	5th	Mid-Con Tournament Semifinals
1997–98	Rees Johnson	6–19	3–13	8th	—
Total:		95–176	0–0		
National champion Postseason invitational champion Conference regular season champion Conference regular season and conference tournament champion Division regular season champion Division regular season and conference tournament champion Conference tournament champion

=== Conference tournament history ===
==== East Coast Conference ====
Date	Seed	Location	Round	Result
March 5, 1994	2nd	Buffalo Arena • Buffalo, New York	Semifinals	W 83–81 2OT over (3) Buffalo
March 6, 1994	2nd	Buffalo Arena • Buffalo, New York	Championship	L 88–86 2OT to (5) Hofstra

==== Mid-Continent Conference ====
Date	Seed	Location	Round	Result
March 2, 1997	4th	Moline, Illinois	Quarterfinals	W 75–48 over (5) UMKC
March 3, 1997		Moline, Illinois	Semifinals	L 88–82 1OT to (1) Valparaiso

== Head coaching history ==
#	Name	Years	Record
1	Rees Johnson	1988–1998	95–176
