= Millington Central High School =

Millington Central Middle High School

Location
- 8050 West St; Millington, Tennessee 38053; United States; 35.34613°N 89.89775°W

Information
- Type: Public
- Established: 1927; 99 years ago
- School district: Millington Municipal School District
- Administrator: 5
- Principal: Michael Perry
- Faculty: 132
- Teaching staff: 81.00 (FTE)
- Grades: 7–12
- Enrollment: 1,211 (2023-2024)
- Student to teacher ratio: 14.95
- Color
- Athletics: 17 varsity teams
- Athletics conference: TSSAA
- Mascot: Trojan
- Accreditation: Southern Association of Colleges and Schools
- Website: mchs.millingtonschools.org

Millington Central Middle High School (formerly known as Millington Central High School MCHS) is a public school (grades 7–12 formerly grades 9–12) located in southern Millington, Tennessee, United States, and is a part of the Millington Municipal School District. Millington Central High School was the first accredited school in the Shelby County Schools district. In 2014, the school left the county system, and was administrated by the newly Millington Municipal School District.

MCMHS is accredited by the Southern Association of Colleges and Schools and is a member of the NASSP, TSSAA, SACAC, and NACAC. The school was built in 1907.

MCMHS serves the city of Millington, including the city's annexation reserve, which is a large unincorporated portion within Shelby County.

== Curriculum ==
A full range of college preparatory courses and technical/career courses, Advanced Placement, and special education courses are offered. Included are four levels of English, four years of foreign language, extensive offerings in math and science, a television and video production department, full social studies electives, computer laboratory experiences, and fine arts (art, drama, and music) electives. Additionally, production classes for student publications and a student-produced news television program are offered for credit.

- Advanced Placement courses are offered in English, United States History, Calculus, Chemistry, and Biology.
- Honors classes include English, Biology, Chemistry, World History, World Geography, Foreign Languages, Pre-Calculus, Geometry, and Algebra 2.
- Technical/Vocational courses offered are Automotive Technology, Early Childhood Education, Cosmetology, Culinary Arts, Broadcast & Media Technology, Computer Repair Technology, Family & Consumer Science, Graphic Communications Technology, Marketing, Manufacturing Technology, Office Technology, and Construction Technology.

== Notable alumni ==
- Alan Cross, football player
- Ahmad Galloway, football player
- Tyrone Calico, football player
- Marlon Barnes, football player
