= Summit League men's basketball tournament =

American college basketball conference tournament

- Conference basketball championship
- The Summit League Conference tournament logo (2008–present)
- Sport: College basketball
- Conference: Summit League
- Number of teams: All 8 conference teams
- Format: Single-elimination tournament
- Current stadium: Denny Sanford Premier Center
- Current location: Sioux Falls, South Dakota
- Played: 1984–present
- Last contest: 2026
- Current champion: North Dakota State (6)
- Most championships: Valparaiso (8)
- TV partner(s): CBS Sports Network, Midco Sports
- Official website: The Summit League Basketball Championship s

The Summit League men's basketball tournament, popularly known as The Summit League at the Falls, is the post-season tournament for NCAA Division I conference Summit League. The winner of the tournament receives the Summit League's automatic bid into the NCAA Men's Division I Basketball Championship. The tournament was first played in 1984, when the league was known as the Association of Mid-Continent Universities (AMCU). The league was also known as the Mid-Continent Conference from 1989 to 2007, after which it was renamed to The Summit League.

== Format ==
Currently, all 8 men's basketball teams in the Summit League receive a berth in the conference tournament (barring NCAA sanctions). Before the 2022-23 season, only the top 8 conference teams (by conference record) made the tournament. After the 16-game conference season, teams are seeded by conference record with the following tie-breakers:

- Head-to-head competition
- Winning percentage vs. ranked conference teams (starting with #1 and moving down until the tie is broken)
- NCAA Evaluation Tool (NET)
- Coin flip

== Tournament champions ==
Year	Champion	Score	Runner-up	Tournament MVP	Venue	Location	Notes
1984	Western Illinois	73–64	Cleveland State	Todd Hutcheson, WIU	Hammons Student Center	Springfield, Missouri	
1985	Eastern Illinois	75–64	Southwest Missouri State (Note: Known as Missouri State since 2005.)	None chosen	Hammons Student Center	Springfield, Missouri	First rounds at campus sites
1986	Cleveland State	70–66	Eastern Illinois	Kevin Duckworth, EIU	Hammons Student Center	Springfield, Missouri	
1987	Southwest Missouri State	90–87	Cleveland State	Winston Garland, SMS	Hammons Student Center	Springfield, Missouri	
1988	Not held						
1989	Southwest Missouri State	73–67	Illinois-Chicago (Note: Now branded as UIC.)	Hubert Henderson, SMS	Hammons Student Center	Springfield, Missouri	
1990	Northern Iowa	53–45	Green Bay	Jason Reese, UNI	UNI-Dome	Cedar Falls, Iowa	
1991	Green Bay	56–39	Northern Illinois	Tony Bennett, UWGB	Brown County Veterans Memorial Arena	Green Bay, Wisconsin	
1992	Eastern Illinois	83–68	Illinois-Chicago	Steve Rowe, EIU	CSU Convocation Center	Cleveland, Ohio	
1993	Wright State	94–88	Illinois-Chicago	Bill Edwards, WSU	Nutter Center	Dayton, Ohio	
1994	Green Bay	61–56	Illinois-Chicago	Sherell Ford, UIC	Rosemont Horizon	Rosemont, Illinois	
1995	Valparaiso	88–85 (3OT)	Western Illinois	Bryce Drew, VU	Athletics-Recreation Center	Valparaiso, Indiana	First rounds at campus sites
1996	Valparaiso	75–52	Western Illinois	Bryce Drew, VU	The MARK of the Quad Cities	Moline, Illinois	
1997	Valparaiso	63–59	Western Illinois	Janthony Joseph, WIU	The MARK of the Quad Cities	Moline, Illinois	
1998	Valparaiso	67–48	Youngstown State	Bryce Drew, VU	The MARK of the Quad Cities	Moline, Illinois	
1999	Valparaiso	73–69	Oral Roberts	Milo Stovall, VU	The MARK of the Quad Cities	Moline, Illinois	
2000	Valparaiso	71–62	Southern Utah	Luboš Bartoň, VU	Allen County War Memorial Coliseum	Fort Wayne, Indiana	
2001	Southern Utah	62–59	Valparaiso	Fred House, SUU	Allen County War Memorial Coliseum	Fort Wayne, Indiana	
2002	Valparaiso	88–55	IUPUI (Note: IUPUI was dissolved in 2024 and replaced by separate institutions affiliated with the Indiana University and Purdue University systems. The new Indiana University Indianapolis inherited the athletic program, which is now known as IU Indy.)	Milo Stovall, VU	Allen County War Memorial Coliseum	Fort Wayne, Indiana	
2003	IUPUI	66–64	Valparaiso	Josh Murray, IUPUI	Kemper Arena	Kansas City, Missouri	
2004	Valparaiso	75–70	IUPUI	Odell Bradley, IUPUI	Kemper Arena	Kansas City, Missouri	
2005	Oakland	61–60	Oral Roberts	Rawle Marshall, OU	Union Multipurpose Activity Center	Tulsa, Oklahoma	
2006	Oral Roberts	85–72	Chicago State	Ken Tutt, ORU	Union Multipurpose Activity Center	Tulsa, Oklahoma	
2007	Oral Roberts	71–67	Oakland	Ken Tutt, ORU	Union Multipurpose Activity Center	Tulsa, Oklahoma	
2008	Oral Roberts	71–64	IUPUI	Moses Ehambe, ORU	Union Multipurpose Activity Center	Tulsa, Oklahoma	
2009	North Dakota State	66–64	Oakland	Ben Woodside, NDSU	Sioux Falls Arena	Sioux Falls, South Dakota	
2010	Oakland	76–64	IUPUI	Derick Nelson, OU	Sioux Falls Arena	Sioux Falls, South Dakota	
2011	Oakland	90–76	Oral Roberts	Keith Benson, OU	Sioux Falls Arena	Sioux Falls, South Dakota	
2012	South Dakota State	52–50 (OT)	Western Illinois	Nate Wolters, SDSU	Sioux Falls Arena	Sioux Falls, South Dakota	
2013	South Dakota State	73–67	North Dakota State	Nate Wolters, SDSU	Sioux Falls Arena	Sioux Falls, South Dakota	
2014	North Dakota State	60–57	IPFW (Note: Now Purdue Fort Wayne.)	Taylor Braun, NDSU	Sioux Falls Arena	Sioux Falls, South Dakota	
2015	North Dakota State	57–56	South Dakota State	Lawrence Alexander, NDSU	Denny Sanford Premier Center	Sioux Falls, South Dakota	
2016	South Dakota State	67–59	North Dakota State	Mike Daum, SDSU	Denny Sanford Premier Center	Sioux Falls, South Dakota	
2017	South Dakota State	79–77	Omaha	Mike Daum, SDSU	Denny Sanford Premier Center	Sioux Falls, South Dakota	& Individual session attendance record (11,235)
2018	South Dakota State	97–87	South Dakota	Mike Daum, SDSU	Denny Sanford Premier Center	Sioux Falls, South Dakota	
2019	North Dakota State	73–63	Omaha	Vinnie Shahid, NDSU	Denny Sanford Premier Center	Sioux Falls, South Dakota	
2020	North Dakota State	89–53	North Dakota	Vinnie Shahid, NDSU	Denny Sanford Premier Center	Sioux Falls, South Dakota	
2021	Oral Roberts	75–72	North Dakota State	Max Abmas, ORU	Sanford Pentagon	Sioux Falls, South Dakota	Tournament held without fans
2022	South Dakota State	75–69	North Dakota State	Douglas Wilson, SDSU	Denny Sanford Premier Center	Sioux Falls, South Dakota	
2023	Oral Roberts	92–58	North Dakota State	Max Abmas, ORU	Denny Sanford Premier Center	Sioux Falls, South Dakota	
2024	South Dakota State	76–68	Denver	William Kyle III, SDSU	Denny Sanford Premier Center	Sioux Falls, South Dakota	First Final on CBSSN
2025	Omaha	85–75	St. Thomas	Marquel Sutton, UNO	Denny Sanford Premier Center	Sioux Falls, South Dakota	First Semifinals on CBSSN
2026	North Dakota State	70–62	North Dakota	Damari Wheeler-Thomas, NDSU	Denny Sanford Premier Center	Sioux Falls, South Dakota	
2027							

== Performance by school ==
School	Championships	Championship Years
Valparaiso	8	1995, 1996, 1997, 1998, 1999, 2000, 2002, 2004
**South Dakota State**	7	2012, 2013, 2016, 2017, 2018, 2022, 2024
**North Dakota State**	6	2009, 2014, 2015, 2019, 2020, 2026
**Oral Roberts**	5	2006, 2007, 2008, 2021, 2023
Oakland	3	2005, 2010, 2011
Southwest Missouri State	2	1987, 1989
Eastern Illinois	2	1985, 1992
Wisconsin-Green Bay	2	1991, 1994
Western Illinois	1	1984
Cleveland State	1	1986
Northern Iowa	1	1990
Wright State	1	1993
Southern Utah	1	2001
IUPUI	1	2003
**Omaha**	1	2025
TOTAL	42	

- Teams in **bold** are currently in the Summit League. Oral Roberts left for the Southland Conference after the 2011–12 season, but returned for 2014–15.
- Among current Summit League members, Denver, North Dakota, St. Thomas and South Dakota have reached the tournament final but failed to win the championship, while Kansas City has yet to advance to the tournament final. Kansas City, which rejoined in 2020–21, had competed under its academic identity of UMKC during its previous Summit tenure (1994–95 to 2012–13).

== NCAA Tournament appearances ==
Year	Summit League Team	Opponent	Result
1986	(14) Cleveland State	(3) Indiana (6) Saint Joseph's (7) Navy	W 83–79; W 75–69; L 70–71
1987	(13) Southwest Missouri State	(4) Clemson (5) Kansas	W 65–60; L 63–67
1988	(13) Southwest Missouri State (Note: The regular season champion received a berth in the NCAA tournament)	(4) UNLV	L 50–54
1989	(14) Southwest Missouri State	(3) Seton Hall	L 51–60
1990	(9) Southwest Missouri State	(8) North Carolina	L 70–83
1990	(14) Northern Iowa	(3) Missouri (6) Minnesota	W 74–71; L 78–81
1991	(12) Green Bay	(5) Michigan State	L 58–60
1991	(13) Northern Illinois	(4) St. John's	L 68–75
1992	(15) Eastern Illinois	(2) Indiana	L 55–94
1993	(16) Wright State	(1) Indiana	L 54–97
1994	(12) Green Bay	(5) California (4) Syracuse	W 61–57; L 59–64
1995	No automatic qualifier		
1996	(14) Valparaiso	(3) Arizona	L 51–90
1997	(12) Valparaiso	(5) Boston College	L 66–73
1998	(13) Valparaiso	(4) Ole Miss (12) Florida State (8) Rhode Island	W 70–69; W 83–77^{OT} L 68-74
1999	(15) Valparaiso	(2) Maryland	L 60–82
2000	(16) Valparaiso	(1) Michigan State	L 38–65
2001	(14) Southern Utah	(3) Boston College	L 65–68
2002	(13) Valparaiso	(4) Kentucky	L 68–83
2003	(16) IUPUI	(1) Kentucky	L 64–95
2004	(15) Valparaiso	(2) Gonzaga	L 49–76
2005	(16) Oakland	(16) Alabama A&M (1) North Carolina	W 79–69; L 68–96
2006	(16) Oral Roberts	(1) Memphis	L 78–94
2007	(14) Oral Roberts	(3) Washington State	L 54–70
2008	(13) Oral Roberts	(4) Pittsburgh	L 63–82
2009	(14) North Dakota State	(3) Kansas	L 74–84
2010	(14) Oakland	(3) Pittsburgh	L 66–89
2011	(13) Oakland	(4) Texas	L 81–85
2012	(14) South Dakota State	(3) Baylor	L 60–68
2013	(13) South Dakota State	(4) Michigan	L 56–71
2014	(12) North Dakota State	(5) Oklahoma (4) San Diego State	W 80–75^{OT} L 44–63
2015	(15) North Dakota State	(2) Gonzaga	L 76–86
2016	(12) South Dakota State	(5) Maryland	L 74–79
2017	(16) South Dakota State	(1) Gonzaga	L 46–66
2018	(12) South Dakota State	(5) Ohio State	L 73–81
2019	(16) North Dakota State	(16) North Carolina Central (1) Duke	W 78–74; L 62–85
2021	(15) Oral Roberts	(2) Ohio State (7) Florida (3) Arkansas	W 75–72^{OT} W 81–78; L 70–72
2022	(13) South Dakota State	(4) Providence	L 57–66
2023	(12) Oral Roberts	(5) Duke	L 51–74
2024	(15) South Dakota State	(2) Iowa State	L 65–82
2025	(15) Omaha	(2) St. John's	L 53–83
2026	(14) North Dakota State	(3) Michigan State	L 67–92

- 2020 NCAA tournament was canceled due to COVID-19.

== Television coverage ==
Year	Network	Play-by-play	Analyst	Sideline
2026	CBSSN	Chris Lewis	Noah Buono	Emily Proud
2025	CBSSN	Jordan Kent	Tim Doyle	Emily Proud
2024	CBSSN	John Sadak	Tim Doyle	Emily Proud
2023	ESPN2	Clay Matvick	Kevin Lehman	
2022	ESPN2	Clay Matvick	Kevin Lehman	Elaina Lanson
2021	ESPN2	Kevin Fitzgerald	Dalen Cuff	
2020	ESPN2	Clay Matvick	Bryce Drew	Elaina Lanson
2019	ESPN2	Clay Matvick	Sean Harrington	
2018	ESPN2	Clay Matvick	Sean Harrington	
2017	ESPN2	Clay Matvick	Sean Harrington	
2016	ESPN2	Bob Wischusen	Sean Harrington	
2015	ESPN2	Clay Matvick	Sean Harrington	
2014	ESPN2	Clay Matvick	Darrin Horn	
2013	ESPN2	Clay Matvick	Bob Valvano	
2012	ESPN2	Clay Matvick	Bob Valvano	
2011	ESPN2	Lou Canellis	Mike Kelley	
2010	ESPN2	Lou Canellis	Mike Kelley	
2009	ESPN2	Dave Barnett	Tim Welsh	
2008	ESPN	Ron Franklin	Fran Fraschilla	
2007	ESPN	Ron Franklin	Fran Fraschilla	
2006	ESPN	Ron Franklin	Fran Fraschilla	
2005	ESPN2	Bob Carpenter	Donny Marshall	
2004	ESPN2	Dave Strader	Tim McCormick	
2003	ESPN2	Chris Marlowe	Tim McCormick	
2002	ESPN2		Tim McCormick	
2001	ESPN2	Dave Barnett	Quinn Buckner	
2000	ESPN2	Derrin Horton		
1999	ESPN2	Chris Marlowe		
1998	ESPN2	Craig Bolerjack	Terry Gannon	
1997	ESPN2	Dave Strader	Leo Rautins	
1996	ESPN2	Tom Mees	Jay Bilas	
1995	ESPN2	Gus Johnson	Clark Kellogg	
1994	ESPN	Tim Brando	Larry Conley	
1993	ESPN	Tim Brando	Clark Kellogg	
1992	ESPN	Tim Brando	Clark Kellogg	
1991	ESPN	Wayne Larrivee	Clark Kellogg	
1990	ESPN	Sean McDonough	Mike Rice	
1989	ESPN	Jim Kelly	Mike Rice	

== See also ==
- Summit League women's basketball tournament
