= 2004–05 UMKC Kangaroos men's basketball team =

American college basketball season

2004–05 UMKC Kangaroos men's basketball
- Conference: Mid–Continent Conference
- Record: 16–12 (12–4 Mid–Con)
- Head coach: Rich Zvosec (4th season)
- Associate head coach: Ken Dempsey (4th season)
- Assistant coach: Jason Ivey (5th season)
- Home arena: Municipal Auditorium, Hale Arena

2004–05 Mid-Continent Conference men's basketball standings
	Conf.				Overall
Team	W		L	PCT	W		L	PCT
Oral Roberts	13	–	3	.813	25	–	8	.758
UMKC	12	–	4	.750	16	–	12	.571
Valparaiso	10	–	6	.625	15	–	16	.484
IUPUI	9	–	7	.563	16	–	13	.552
Western Illinois	7	–	9	.438	11	–	17	.393
Chicago State	7	–	9	.438	9	–	19	.321
Oakland †	7	–	9	.438	13	–	19	.406
Southern Utah	6	–	10	.375	13	–	15	.464
Centenary	1	–	15	.063	3	–	24	.111
† 2005 Mid-Con Tournament winner Rankings from AP Poll

The 2004–05 UMKC Kangaroos men's basketball team represented the University of Missouri–Kansas City during the 2004–05 NCAA Division I men's basketball season. The Kangaroos played their home games off-campus, most at Municipal Auditorium (with three at Hale Arena) in Kansas City, Missouri, as a member of the Mid–Continent Conference.

== Previous season ==
The Kangaroos finished the 2003–04 season with a record of 15–14 overall, 9–7 in the Mid–Continent Conference to finish in a tie for fifth place.

== Roster ==
2004–05 UMKC Kangaroos men's basketball team
Players
Coaches

Pos.	#	Name	Height	Weight	Year	Previous school	Hometown
C	32	Carlton Aaron	6 ft 9 in (2.06 m)	322 lb (146 kg)	RS Sr	Temple; The Winchendon/ Atlantic Shores Christian	Bronx, NY
F	42	Mike English	6 ft 4 in (1.93 m)	225 lb (102 kg)	Sr	Kaskaskia/ Lincoln Trail; Jennings Senior & College Prep	St. Louis, MO
F	25	Corey Starks	6 ft 5 in (1.96 m)	230 lb (104 kg)	Sr	Chaffey; Rancho Cucamonga HS	Rancho, Cucomonga, CA
G	3	Brandon Temple	6 ft 1 in (1.85 m)	180 lb (82 kg)	Sr	Missouri State–West Plains; Wake Forest–Rolesville HS	Raleigh, NC
F	15	Brandon Lipsey	6 ft 8 in (2.03 m)	200 lb (91 kg)	RS Jr	Sumner Arts And Science	Kansas City, KS
G	21	Mark Huppe	6 ft 2 in (1.88 m)	185 lb (84 kg)	Jr	Truman State; Saint Thomas Aquinas HS	Overland Park, KS
C	54	Dan Leadbetter	6 ft 10 in (2.08 m)	265 lb (120 kg)	Jr	Abingdon–Avon HS	Abingdon, IL
F	45	Blake Crawford	6 ft 8 in (2.03 m)	225 lb (102 kg)	So	Blue Valley North HS	Overland Park, KS
G	44	Quinton Day	6 ft 1 in (1.85 m)	182 lb (83 kg)	So	Southern California; Paseo	Kansas City, MO
G	5	Mose Howard	5 ft 11 in (1.8 m)	170 lb (77 kg)	So	Iowa Western CC; Omaha Bryan HS	Omaha, NE
G	22	Tim Blackwell	6 ft 3 in (1.91 m)	190 lb (86 kg)	Fr	Creighton; Cameron HS	Cameron. MO
F	33	Brian Gettinger (redshirt)	6 ft 9 in (2.06 m)	230 lb (104 kg)	Fr	Shawnee Mission South HS	Overland Park, KS
F	4	Jeremiah Hartsock	6 ft 9 in (2.06 m)	215 lb (98 kg)	Fr	Bartlesville HS	Bartlesville, OK

Head coach

- Rich Zvosec (Defiance)

Assistant coach(es)

- Ken Dempsey (Moravian)
- Jason Ivey (Temple)

Legend

- (C) Team captain
- (S) Suspended
- (I) Ineligible
- (W) Walk-on
- (5Y) Fifth-year Senior
- Injured
- Current redshirt

Roster
Last update: November 3, 2024

== Schedule & Results ==
Date time, TV	Rank^{#}	Opponent^{#}	Result	Record	High points	High rebounds	High assists	Site (attendance) city, state
Regular Season
November 23, 2004*; 7:37 PM		at No. 12 Mississippi State	L 64–82	0–1	15 – Howard	9 – Aaron	3 – English, Howard	Humphrey Coliseum (5,541); Starkville, MS
December 1, 2004*; 7:05 PM		at Eastern Illinois	L 69–77	0–2	14 – English, Starks, Temple	8 – Aaron	5 – Temple	Lantz Arena (1,040); Charleston, IL
December 4, 2004*; 6:00 PM		at Central Florida	L 56–62	0–3	17 – Howard	5 – Hartsock	5 – Temple, Howard	UCF Arena (1,275); Orlando, FL
December 11, 2004*; 7:00 PM		Northern Iowa	L 58–81	0–4	18 – English	14 – Aaron	6 – Howard	Municipal Auditorium (3,969); Kansas City, MO
December 18, 2004*; 7:00 PM		Central Florida	L 56–57	0–5	21 – English	8 – English	5 – Day	Municipal Auditorium (2,669); Kansas City, MO
December 21, 2004*; 8:00 PM		at Colorado	L 68–79	0–6	17 – English, Day	7 – English, Lipsey	4 – English	Coors Events/Conference Center (2,372); Boulder, CO
December 28, 2004*; 7:05 PM		at Wichita State	L 68–81	0–7	18 – Aaron	9 – Aaron	10 – Day	Charles Koch Arena (10.478); Wichita, KS
January 3, 2005; 6:00 PM		at Indiana/Purdue–Indianapolis	W 77–61	1–7 (1–0)	21 – Day	12 – Aaron	7 – English	IUPUI Gymnasium (1,379); Indianapolis, IN
January 6, 2005; 7:00 PM		Southern Utah	W 88–78	2–7 (2–0)	24 – Temple	17 – Aaron	6 – Day	Municipal Auditorium (1,744); Kansas City, MO
January 8, 2005; 7:00 PM		at Centenary	W 70–66	3–7 (3–0)	25 – Blackwell	16 – Aaron	4 – English, Temple, Day	Gold Dome (1,132); Shreveport, LA
January 10, 2005*; 7:00 PM		North Dakota State	W 80–67	4–7	19 – Aaron, Temple	13 – Aaron	6 – Day	Municipal Auditorium (1,322); Kansas City, MO
January 13, 2005; 7:05 PM		at Valparaiso	W 84–78	5–7 (4–0)	26 – English	8 – Aaron	8 – Blackwell	Athletics–Recreation Center (4,003); Valparaiso, IN
January 15, 2005; 8:05 PM		at Western Illinois	W 82–80	6–7 (5–0)	24 – English	8 – English	8 – Day	Western Hall (1,191); Macomb, IL
January 17, 2005*; 7:00 PM		South Dakota State	W 95–85	7–7	20 – English	7 – Day	6 – Day	Hale Arena (2,242); Kansas City, MO
January 20, 2005; 7:00 PM		Indiana/Purdue–Indianapolis	W 81–76	8–7 (6–0)	25 – Temple	6 – Starks	5 – English	Hale Arena (2,425); Kansas City, MO
January 24, 2005; 7:00 PM		Centenary	W 81–76	9–7 (7–0)	31 – Aaron	14 – Aaron	5 – English	Hale Arena (2,232); Kansas City, MO
January 29, 2005; 7:05 PM		at Oral Roberts	W 88–74	10–7 (8–0)	25 – Temple	8 – Aaron	4 – Temple, Day	Mabee Center (10,331); Tulsa, OK
February 3, 2005; 5:00 PM		at Oakland	W 83–76	11–7 (9–0)	22 – Aaron	13 – Aaron	6 – English	Athletics Center O'rena (1,565); Auburn Hills, MI
February 5, 2005; 7:00 PM, Metro Sports		Chicago State	L 69–72	11–8 (9–1)	19 – English, Temple	10 – Aaron	4 – Blackwell	Municipal Auditorium (6,503); Kansas City, MO
February 7, 2005*; 7:00 PM		Utah Valley State	W 84–77	12–8	26 – Aaron	13 – Aaron	4 – English, Day	Municipal Auditorium (2,632); Kansas City, MO
February 12, 2005; 7:00 PM		Oakland	L 50–60	12–9 (9–2)	14 – Blackwell	11 – Aaron	4 – English	Municipal Auditorium (6,844); Kansas City, MO
February 14, 2005*; 6:05 PM		at Longwood	W 74–51	13–9	16 – Temple	14 – Aaron	4 – English, Temple	Willett Hall (404); Farmville, VA
February 17, 2005; 7:00 PM		Western Illinois	W 67–63	14–9 (10–2)	13 – Aaron	5 – English, Blackwell	4 – Day	Municipal Auditorium (3,372); Kansas City, MO
February 22, 2005; 7:00 PM		Oral Roberts	W 77–70	15–9 (11–2)	22 – Day	14 – Aaron	6 – Day	Municipal Auditorium (7,132); Kansas City, MO
February 24, 2005; 7:00 PM		at Chicago State	L 72–74	15–10 (11–3)	18 – Aaron	15 – Aaron	6 – Temple, Day	Jacoby D. Dickens Physical; Education and Athletics Center (545); Chicago, IL
February 26, 2005; 8:35 PM		at Southern Utah	L 75–80	15–11 (11–4)	19 – English	8 – Aaron	5 – English	Centrum Arena (2,966); Cedar City, UT
February 28, 2005; 7:00 PM		Valparaiso	W 80–79	16–11 (12–4)	20 – Temple	6 – Aaron, English, Day	4 – English	Municipal Auditorium (4,642); Kansas City, MO
Conference Tournament
March 5, 2005*; 8:30 PM	(2)	vs. (7) Oakland [Quarterfinal]	L 63–67	16–12	30 – Watson	11 – Starks	6 – Watson	John Q. Hammons Arena (4,561); Tulsa, OK
*Non-conference game. ^{#}Rankings from AP Poll. (#) Tournament seedings in parentheses. All times are in Central Standard Time (CST).
