= 2006–07 Oral Roberts Golden Eagles men's basketball team =

American college basketball season

2006–07 Oral Roberts Golden Eagles men's basketball

Mid-Continent tournament champions Mid-Continent Regular season champions

NCAA tournament, Round of 64
- Conference: Mid-Continent Conference
- Record: 23–11 (12–2 Mid-Con)
- Head coach: Scott Sutton (8th season)
- Assistant coaches: Tom Hankins; Conley Phipps
- Home arena: Mabee Center

2006–07 Mid-Continent Conference men's basketball standings
	Conf.				Overall
Team	W		L	PCT	W		L	PCT
Oral Roberts †	12	–	2	.857	23	–	11	.676
Oakland	10	–	4	.714	19	–	14	.576
Valparaiso	9	–	5	.643	16	–	15	.516
IUPUI	7	–	7	.500	15	–	15	.500
Southern Utah	6	–	8	.429	16	–	14	.533
UMKC	6	–	8	.429	12	–	20	.375
Western Illinois	3	–	11	.214	7	–	23	.233
Centenary	3	–	11	.214	10	–	21	.323
† 2007 Mid-Continent Tournament winner Rankings from AP Poll

The 2006–07 Oral Roberts Golden Eagles men's basketball team represented Oral Roberts University during the 2006–07 NCAA Division I men's basketball season. The Golden Eagles, led by 8th year head coach Scott Sutton, played their home games at the Mabee Center and were members of Mid-Continent Conference. They finished the season 23–11, 12–2 in league play to be crowned regular season champions. They won the Mid-Continent Conference tournament to receive an automatic bid to the NCAA tournament as No. 14 seed in the East region. The Golden Eagles lost to No. 3 seed Washington State in the opening round.

== Roster ==
2006–07 Oral Roberts Golden Eagles men's basketball team
Players
Coaches

Pos.	#	Name	Height	Weight	Year	Previous school	Hometown
G	10	Robert Jarvis	5 ft 11 in (1.8 m)	185 lb (84 kg)	So		Humble, Texas
G	11	Adam Liberty	6 ft 2 in (1.88 m)	180 lb (82 kg)	Jr		Oklahoma City, Oklahoma
F	13	Moses Ehambe	6 ft 5 in (1.96 m)	215 lb (98 kg)	Jr	Mansfield Summit	Arlington, Texas
F	21	Marcus Lewis	6 ft 8 in (2.03 m)	265 lb (120 kg)	So		Long Beach, California
F	30	Caleb Green	6 ft 8 in (2.03 m)	255 lb (116 kg)	Sr	Tulsa Memorial	Tulsa, Oklahoma
C	33	Shawn King	6 ft 10 in (2.08 m)	225 lb (102 kg)	Jr	Carl Albert State	Gasparillo, Trinidad and Tobago
F	44	Marchello Vealy	6 ft 7 in (2.01 m)	215 lb (98 kg)	So		Oklahoma City, Oklahoma

Head coach

- Scott Sutton (Oklahoma State)

Assistant coach(es)

Legend

- (C) Team captain
- (S) Suspended
- (I) Ineligible
- (W) Walk-on
- Injured
- Current redshirt

Roster

== Schedule and results ==
Date time, TV	Rank^{#}	Opponent^{#}	Result	Record	Site (attendance) city, state
Exhibition
Nov 2, 2006*		Langston	W 97–69		Mabee Center; Tulsa, Oklahoma
Nov 4, 2006*		Central Oklahoma	T 69–69		Mabee Center; Tulsa, Oklahoma
Non-Conference regular season
Nov 10, 2006*		at Loyola Marymount	L 65–68	0–1	Gersten Pavilion (2,855); Los Angeles, California
Nov 15, 2006*		at No. 3 Kansas	W 78–71	1–1	Allen Fieldhouse (16,300); Lawrence, Kansas
Nov 21, 2006*		Louisiana-Lafayette	W 54–51	2–1	Mabee Center (5,214); Tulsa, Oklahoma
Nov 25, 2006*		Oklahoma Panhandle	W 91–41	3–1	Mabee Center (4,571); Tulsa, Oklahoma
Nov 28, 2006*		at Tulsa	L 57–75	3–2	Reynolds Center (6,819); Tulsa, Oklahoma
Dec 2, 2006*		Akron	L 59–61	3–3	Mabee Center (5,201); Tulsa, Oklahoma
Dec 4, 2006*		Lamar	W 88–63	4–3	Mabee Center (4,771); Tulsa, Oklahoma
Dec 9, 2006*; 12:00 p.m.		at Georgetown	L 58–73	4–4	Verizon Center (7,164); Washington, D.C.
Dec 16, 2006*		at Chattanooga	L 72–76	4–5	McKenzie Arena (2,815); Chattanooga, Tennessee
Dec 19, 2006*		Montana	W 69–58	5–5	Mabee Center (6,054); Tulsa, Oklahoma
Dec 22, 2006*; ARSN		at Arkansas	L 58–68	5–6	Bud Walton Arena (16,152); Fayetteville, Arkansas
Dec 28, 2006*		vs. Seton Hall; BYU Holiday Classic	W 76–74	6–6	Marriott Center (1,045); Provo, Utah
Dec 29, 2006*; 8:30 p.m.		at BYU; BYU Holiday Classic	L 62–72	6–7	Marriott Center (9,397); Provo, Utah
Dec 30, 2006*		vs. Liberty; BYU Holiday Classic	W 90–58	7–7	Marriott Center (10,103); Provo, Utah
Mid-Con Conference regular season
Jan 4, 2007; 7:05 p.m.		Western Illinois	W 65–46	8–7 (1–0)	Mabee Center (5,682); Tulsa, Oklahoma
Jan 6, 2007		Valparaiso	W 75–60	9–7 (2–0)	Mabee Center (7,913); Tulsa, Oklahoma
Jan 11, 2007		at Southern Utah	W 69–61	10–7 (3–0)	America First Event Center (3,122); Cedar City, Utah
Jan 13, 2007; 7:00 p.m.		at UMKC	W 75–68	11–7 (4–0)	Municipal Auditorium (1,776); Kansas City, Missouri
Jan 18, 2007*		Chicago State	W 59–53	12–7	Mabee Center (6,534); Tulsa, Oklahoma
Jan 20, 2007		at Centenary	W 89–66	13–7 (5–0)	Gold Dome (Centenary) (838); Shreveport, Louisiana
Jan 25, 2007; 6:00 p.m.		Oakland	W 73–63	14–7 (6–0)	Mabee Center (7,706); Tulsa, Oklahoma
Jan 27, 2007; 7:05 p.m.		IUPUI	W 77–66	15–7 (7–0)	Mabee Center (7,651); Tulsa, Oklahoma
Feb 1, 2007		at Valparaiso	L 67–70 ^{OT}	15–8 (7–1)	Athletics-Recreation Center (3,976); Valparaiso, Indiana
Feb 3, 2007; 7:00 p.m.		at Western Illinois	W 67–60	16–8 (8–1)	Western Hall (1,116); Macomb, Illinois
Feb 8, 2007; 7:05 p.m.		UMKC	W 74–68	17–8 (9–1)	Mabee Center (5,682); Tulsa, Oklahoma
Feb 10, 2007		Southern Utah	W 79–57	18–8 (10–1)	Mabee Center (8,172); Tulsa, Oklahoma
Feb 15, 2007		Centenary	W 85–80	19–8 (11–1)	Mabee Center (5,637); Tulsa, Oklahoma
Feb 17, 2007*		Utah State; ESPN BracketBusters	L 65–71	19–9	Mabee Center (9,987); Tulsa, Oklahoma
Feb 22, 2007; 7:00 p.m.		at IUPUI	W 83–73	20–9 (12–1)	IUPUI Gymnasium (1,444); Indianapolis, Indiana
Feb 24, 2007*; 6:00 p.m.		at Oakland	L 84–85 ^{OT}	20–10 (12–2)	Athletics Center O'rena (3,612); Auburn Hills, Michigan
Mid-Con Conference tournament
Mar 3, 2007*	(1)	vs. (8) Centenary; Quarterfinals	W 79–59	21–10	Union Multipurpose Activity Center (3,657); Tulsa, Oklahoma
Mar 5, 2007*; 6:00 p.m.	(1)	vs. (4) IUPUI; Semifinals	W 75–54	22–10	Union Multipurpose Activity Center (4,147); Tulsa, Oklahoma
Mar 6, 2007*; 6:00 p.m.	(1)	vs. (2) Oakland; Championship game	W 71–67	23–10	Union Multipurpose Activity Center (4,877); Tulsa, Oklahoma
NCAA tournament
Mar 15, 2007*; 1:30 p.m., CBS	(14 E)	vs. (3 E) No. 13 Washington State; First Round	L 54–70	23–11	Arco Arena (15,884); Sacramento, California
*Non-conference game. ^{#}Rankings from AP poll. (#) Tournament seedings in parentheses. E=East. All times are in Central Time.
