= 2005–06 UMKC Kangaroos men's basketball team =

American college basketball season

2005–06 UMKC Kangaroos men's basketball
- Conference: Mid–Continent Conference
- Record: 14–14 (11–5 Mid–Con)
- Head coach: Rich Zvosec (5th season)
- Associate head coach: Ken Dempsey (5th season)
- Assistant coach: Jason Ivey (6th season)
- Home arena: Municipal Auditorium, Kemper Arena

2005–06 Mid-Continent Conference men's basketball standings
	Conf.				Overall
Team	W		L	PCT	W		L	PCT
Oral Roberts †	13	–	3	.813	21	–	12	.636
IUPUI	13	–	3	.813	19	–	10	.655
UMKC	11	–	5	.688	14	–	14	.500
Valparaiso	8	–	8	.500	17	–	12	.586
Southern Utah	8	–	8	.500	10	–	20	.333
Chicago State	8	–	8	.500	11	–	19	.367
Oakland	6	–	10	.375	11	–	18	.379
Western Illinois	3	–	13	.188	7	–	21	.250
Centenary	2	–	14	.125	4	–	23	.148
† 2006 Mid-Continent Tournament winner Rankings from AP Poll

The 2005–06 UMKC Kangaroos men's basketball team represented the University of Missouri–Kansas City during the 2005–06 NCAA Division I men's basketball season. The Kangaroos played their home games off-campus, most at Municipal Auditorium (with three at Kemper Arena) in Kansas City, Missouri, as a member of the Mid–Continent Conference.

== Previous season ==
The Kangaroos finished the 2004–05 season with a record of 16–12 overall, 12–4 in the Mid–Continent Conference to finish in second place.

== Roster ==
2005–06 UMKC Kangaroos men's basketball team
Players
Coaches

Pos.	#	Name	Height	Weight	Year	Previous school	Hometown
F	11	Kalu Guasco	6 ft 8 in (2.03 m)	245 lb (111 kg)	Sr	Western Nebraska CC; Pinheiro Machado SP HS	São Paulo, Brazil
G	21	Mark Huppe	6 ft 2 in (1.88 m)	185 lb (84 kg)	Sr	Truman State; Saint Thomas Aquinas HS	Overland Park, KS
F	23	Dee Ayuba	6 ft 6 in (1.98 m)	225 lb (102 kg)	Jr	Seminole State; Edmond Memorial HS	Oklahoma City, OK
F	45	Blake Crawford	6 ft 8 in (2.03 m)	225 lb (102 kg)	Jr	Blue Valley North HS	Overland Park, KS
G	44	Quinton Day	6 ft 1 in (1.85 m)	182 lb (83 kg)	Jr	Southern California; Paseo	Kansas City, MO
C	54	Kyle Spears	6 ft 9 in (2.06 m)	245 lb (111 kg)	Jr	Johnson County CC; Olathe East HS	Olathe, KS
G	22	Tim Blackwell	6 ft 3 in (1.91 m)	190 lb (86 kg)	So	Creighton; Cameron HS	Cameron. MO
F	4	Jeremiah Hartsock	6 ft 9 in (2.06 m)	215 lb (98 kg)	So	Bartlesville HS	Bartlesville, OK
F	15	Brent Stephens	6 ft 6 in (1.98 m)	210 lb (95 kg)	So	Monmouth; Jay HS	Jay, OK
F	33	Brian Gettinger	6 ft 9 in (2.06 m)	230 lb (104 kg)	RS Fr	Shawnee Mission South HS	Overland Park, KS
F	3	Dane Brumagin	6 ft 4 in (1.93 m)	195 lb (88 kg)	Fr	Warrenton Christian HS	Montgomery City, MO
F	32	Jakub Jurczak	6 ft 10 in (2.08 m)	215 lb (98 kg)	Fr	SMS Kozienice HS	Krosmo, Poland
C	14	Alex Pledger	7 ft 1 in (2.16 m)	250 lb (113 kg)	Fr	Hamilton Boys' HS	Hamilton, New Zealand

Head coach

- Rich Zvosec (Defiance)

Assistant coach(es)

- Ken Dempsey (Moravian)
- Jason Ivey (Temple)

Legend

- (C) Team captain
- (S) Suspended
- (I) Ineligible
- (W) Walk-on
- (5Y) Fifth-year Senior
- Injured
- Current redshirt

Roster
Last update: November 3, 2024

== Schedule & Results ==
Date time, TV	Rank^{#}	Opponent^{#}	Result	Record	High points	High rebounds	High assists	Site (attendance) city, state
Exhibition Season
November 5, 2005*; 7:00 PM		Columbia (Missouri)	W 75–54		–	–	–	Municipal Auditorium; Kansas City, MO
November 7, 2005*; 7:00 PM		Sterling (Kansas)	W 72–56		–	–	–	Municipal Auditorium; Kansas City, MO
Regular Season
November 19, 2005*; 7:00 PM		Central Methodist	W 74–61	1–0	33 – Day	7 – Ayuba	8 – Day	Municipal Auditorium (1,846); Kansas City, MO
November 26, 2005*; 7:00 PM		Central Michigan	W 75–65	2–0	22 – Day	9 – Spears	5 – Day	Municipal Auditorium (1,822); Kansas City, MO
November 29, 2005*; 7:05 PM		at Missouri	L 42–60	2–1	11 – Ayuba	12 – Ayuba	3 – Day	Mizzou Arena (7,736); Columbia, MO
December 3, 2005*; 7:00 PM		Longwood	W 79–69	3–1	21 – Ayuba, Day	9 – Ayuba, Spears	7 – Blackwell	Municipal Auditorium (1,554); Kansas City, MO
December 7, 2005*; 6:30 PM		at Penn State	L 71–75	3–2	21 – Blackwell	7 – Spears	8 – Day	Bryce Jordan Center (5,542); State College, PA
December 10, 2005*; 7:00 PM		at Northern Iowa	L 64–87	3–3	27 – Day	7 – Crawford	6 – Blackwell	UNI-Dome (5,219); Cedar Falls, IA
December 12, 2005*; 7:00 PM		at South Dakota State	L 65–72	3–4	18 – Blackwell	12 – Ayuba	6 – Day	Frost Arena (1,546); Brookings, SD
December 17, 2005*; 7:00 PM		Wichita State	L 55–77	3–5	16 – Day	6 – Spears	4 – Day, Blackwell	Municipal Auditorium (2,683); Kansas City, MO
December 27, 2005; 7:05 PM		at Valparaiso	W 75–62	4–5 (1–0)	22 – Day	9 – Spears	3 – Day, Blackwell	Athletics–Recreation Center (4,217); Valparaiso, IN
December 30, 2005*; 7:00 PM		Eastern Illinois	L 67–72	4–6	15 – Day	6 – Ayuba, Day	6 – Day	Kemper Arena (1,764); Kansas City, MO
January 2, 2006; 8:35 PM		at Southern Utah	L 63–97	4–7 (1–1)	26 – Day	7 – Guasco	2 – Day	Centrum Arena (1,957); Cedar City, UT
January 4, 2006; 7:30 PM		at Chicago State	W 80–75	5–7 (1–1)	22 – Ayuba	9 – Ayuba	8 – Day	Jacoby D. Dickens Physical; Education and Athletics Center (431); Chicago, IL
January 7, 2006; 7:00 PM		Centenary	W 69–63	6–7 (3–1)	27 – Day	6 – Ayuba, Day	6 – Day	Municipal Auditorium (2,692); Kansas City, MO
January 9, 2006; 7:00 PM		Western Illinois	W 72–62	7–7 (4–1)	25 – Day	12 – Ayuba	2 – Day, Brumagin	Municipal Auditorium (1,637); Kansas City, MO
January 12, 2006; 7:00 PM		Indiana/Purdue–Indianapolis	L 62–68	7–8 (4–2)	13 – Day, Stephens	9 – Day	8 – Day	Municipal Auditorium (2,123); Kansas City, MO
January 14, 2006; 7:00 PM		Oakland	W 93–91	8–8 (5–2)	29 – Day	6 – Ayba	7 – Day	Municipal Auditorium (3,031); Kansas City, MO
January 17, 2006*; 8:10 PM		at North Dakota State	L 63–87	8–9	24 – Day	4 – Spears	5 – Day	Bison Sports Arena (2,028); Fargo, ND
January 21, 2006; 6:00 PM		at Indiana/Purdue–Indianapolis	L 59–95	8–10 (5–3)	15 – Huppe	5 – Hartsock	4 – Huppe	IUPUI Gymnasium (1,448); Indianapolis, IN
January 28, 2006; 7:00 PM		at Centenary	W 70–67	9–10 (6–3)	25 – Blackwell	7 – Hartsock	6 – Day	Gold Dome (479); Shreveport, LA
January 30, 2006; 7:00 PM		Oral Roberts	L 56–74	9–11 (6–4)	26 – Day	8 – Spears	3 – Day	Kemper Arena (2,471); Kansas City, MO
February 2, 2006*; 8:05 PM		at Utah Valley State	L 61–63	9–12	14 – Day	7 – Stephens	5 – Day	McKay Events Center (621); Orem, UT
February 6, 2006; 7:00 PM		Chicago State	W 82–81 ^{2OT}	10–12 (7–4)	23 – Ayuba	10 – Guasco, Ayuba	10 – Blackwell	Kemper Arena (1,588); Kansas City, MO
February 11, 2006; 5:00 PM		at Oakland	W 84–81	11–12 (8–4)	22 – Ayuba	12 – Ayuba	5 – Ayuba	Athletics Center O'rena (2,985); Auburn Hills, MI
February 16, 2006; 7:05 PM		at Oral Roberts	L 79–86	11–13 (8–5)	27 – Day	8 – Stephens	4 – Day	Mabee Center (6,017); Tulsa, OK
February 18, 2006; 7:00 PM		Southern Utah	W 98–83	12–13 (9–5)	22 – Ayuba, Day	11 – Guasco	5 – Day	Municipal Auditorium (2,572); Kansas City, MO
February 23, 2006; 7:00 PM		Valparaiso	W 73–70	13–13 (10–5)	37 – Day	5 – Ayuba, Blackwell	5 – Day	Municipal Auditorium (2,611); Kansas City, MO
February 25, 2006; 7:00 PM		at Western Illinois	W 77–73	14–13 (11–5)	16 – Guasco, Day, Blackwell	7 – Guasco, Ayuba	4 – Blackwell	Western Hall (1,113); Macomb, IL
Conference Tournament
March 5, 2006*; 8:30 PM	(3)	vs. (6) Chicago State [Quarterfinal]	L 66–75	14–14	24 – Ayuba	6 – Ayuba, Day	6 – Day	John Q. Hammons Arena (2,105); Tulsa, OK
*Non-conference game. ^{#}Rankings from AP Poll. (#) Tournament seedings in parentheses. All times are in Central Standard Time (CST).
