= 2006–07 UMKC Kangaroos men's basketball team =

American college basketball season

2006–07 UMKC Kangaroos men's basketball
- Conference: Mid–Continent Conference
- Record: 12–20 (6–8 Mid–Con)
- Head coach: Rich Zvosec (6th season)
- Associate head coach: Ken Dempsey (6th season)
- Assistant coach: Jason Ivey (7th season)
- Home arena: Municipal Auditorium, Kemper Arena

2006–07 Mid-Continent Conference men's basketball standings
	Conf.				Overall
Team	W		L	PCT	W		L	PCT
Oral Roberts †	12	–	2	.857	23	–	11	.676
Oakland	10	–	4	.714	19	–	14	.576
Valparaiso	9	–	5	.643	16	–	15	.516
IUPUI	7	–	7	.500	15	–	15	.500
Southern Utah	6	–	8	.429	16	–	14	.533
UMKC	6	–	8	.429	12	–	20	.375
Western Illinois	3	–	11	.214	7	–	23	.233
Centenary	3	–	11	.214	10	–	21	.323
† 2007 Mid-Continent Tournament winner Rankings from AP Poll

The 2006–07 UMKC Kangaroos men's basketball team represented the University of Missouri–Kansas City during the 2006–07 NCAA Division I men's basketball season. The Kangaroos played their home games off-campus, most at Municipal Auditorium (with four at Kemper Arena) in Kansas City, Missouri, as a member of the Mid–Continent Conference.

== Previous season ==
The Kangaroos finished the 2005–06 season with a record of 14–14 overall, 11–5 in the Mid–Continent Conference to finish in third place.

== Roster ==
2006–07 UMKC Kangaroos men's basketball team
Players
Coaches

Pos.	#	Name	Height	Weight	Year	Previous school	Hometown
F	23	Dee Ayuba	6 ft 6 in (1.98 m)	225 lb (102 kg)	Sr	Seminole State; Edmond Memorial HS	Oklahoma City, OK
F	45	Blake Crawford	6 ft 8 in (2.03 m)	225 lb (102 kg)	Sr	Blue Valley North HS	Overland Park, KS
G	44	Quinton Day	6 ft 1 in (1.85 m)	182 lb (83 kg)	Sr	Southern California; Paseo	Kansas City, MO
C	54	Kyle Spears	6 ft 9 in (2.06 m)	245 lb (111 kg)	Sr	Johnson County CC; Olathe East HS	Olathe, KS
G	22	Tim Blackwell	6 ft 3 in (1.91 m)	190 lb (86 kg)	Jr	Creighton; Cameron HS	Cameron. MO
F	4	Jeremiah Hartsock	6 ft 9 in (2.06 m)	215 lb (98 kg)	Jr	Bartlesville HS	Bartlesville, OK
G	41	Akeem Hemingway (injured) (redshirt)	6 ft 0 in (1.83 m)	190 lb (86 kg)	Jr	Connors State; Fort Union Military/ Myrtle Beach HS	Myrtle Beach, SC
F	15	Brent Stephens	6 ft 6 in (1.98 m)	210 lb (95 kg)	Jr	Monmouth; Jay HS	Jay, OK
F	33	Brian Gettinger	6 ft 9 in (2.06 m)	230 lb (104 kg)	RS So	Shawnee Mission South HS	Overland Park, KS
F	3	Dane Brumagin	6 ft 4 in (1.93 m)	195 lb (88 kg)	So	Warrenton Christian HS	Montgomery City, MO
F	32	Jakub Jurczak	6 ft 10 in (2.08 m)	215 lb (98 kg)	So	SMS Kozienice HS	Krosno, Poland
C	14	Alex Pledger	7 ft 1 in (2.16 m)	250 lb (113 kg)	So	Hamilton Boys' HS	Hamilton, New Zealand
G	1	Dominique Johnson	5 ft 10 in (1.78 m)	160 lb (73 kg)	Fr	Lincoln College Preparatory	Kansas City, MO

Head coach

- Rich Zvosec (Defiance)

Assistant coach(es)

- Ken Dempsey (Moravian)
- Jason Ivey (Temple)

Legend

- (C) Team captain
- (S) Suspended
- (I) Ineligible
- (W) Walk-on
- (5Y) Fifth-year Senior
- Injured
- Current redshirt

Roster
Last update: November 3, 2024

== Schedule & Results ==
Date time, TV	Rank^{#}	Opponent^{#}	Result	Record	High points	High rebounds	High assists	Site (attendance) city, state
Exhibition Season
November 4, 2006*; 7:00 PM		Benedictine (Kansas)	W 91–58		–	–	–	Municipal Auditorium; Kansas City, MO
Non–Conference Regular Season
November 13, 2006*; 7:00 PM		Florida Atlantic	W 85–70	1–0	25 – Johnson	15 – Pledger	5 – Day, Johnson	Municipal Auditorium (1,233); Kansas City, MO
November 15, 2006*; 7:00 PM		Baker	W 97–58	2–0	24 – Day	6 – Stephens, Brumagin	4 – Day	Municipal Auditorium (1,164); Kansas City, MO
November 19, 2006*; 1:00 PM		at Central Michigan	L 68–85	2–1	26 – Brumagin	5 – Stephens, Brumagin	3 – Johnson	Daniel P. Rose Center (1,487); Mount Pleasant, MI
November 23, 2006*; 12:45 AM		vs. Pacific; Carrs/Safeway Great Alaska Shootout [Quarterfinal]	L 70–71	2–2	26 – Stephens	7 – Stephens	4 – Day	George M. Sullivan Arena (6,056); Anchorage, AK
November 24, 2006*; 3:00 PM		vs. Alaska–Anchorage; Carrs/Safeway Great Alaska Shootout [Consolation Semifinal]	L 70–77	2–3	28 – Day	5 – Stephens	3 – Blackwell	George M. Sullivan Arena (5,729); Anchorage, AK
November 25, 2006*; 3:00 PM		vs. Marshall; Carrs/Safeway Great Alaska Shootout [Seventh Place]	W 79–75	3–3	23 – Day	5 – Crawford	8 – Day	George M. Sullivan Arena (5,515); Anchorage, AK
November 29, 2006*; 7:05 PM		at No. 17 Wichita State	L 55–85	3–4	19 – Day	6 – Johnson	3 – Day	Charles Koch Arena (10,478); Wichita, KS
December 2, 2006*; 12:05 PM		at Arkansas	L 61–71	3–5	14 – Day	4 – Spears, Hartsock	6 – Johnson	Bud Walton Arena (14,782); Fayetteville, AR
December 5, 2006*; 7:00 PM		Utah Valley State	L 79–91	3–6	24 – Day	4 – Stephens, Brumagin	5 – Day, Johnson	Municipal Auditorium (1,132); Kansas City, MO
December 9, 2006*; 7:05 PM		at Northern Iowa	L 53–85	3–7	21 – Day	7 – Pledger	3 – Day, Johnson	McLeod Center (5,127); Cedar Falls, IA
December 13, 2006*; 7:00 PM		at Maryland	L 50–101	3–8	17 – Day	10 – Pledger	4 – Day	Comcast Center (17,950); College Park, MD
December 16, 2006*; 7:00 PM		Central Arkansas	W 80–68	4–8	25 – Day	7 – Pledger	4 – Ayuba	Municipal Auditorium (1,416); Kansas City, MO
December 19, 2006*; 7:00 PM		South Dakota State	L 71–79 ^{OT}	4–9	16 – Ayuba	8 – Ayuba, Crawford	6 – Day	Municipal Auditorium (1,687); Kansas City, MO
December 23, 2006*; 6:00 PM		at Florida Atlantic	L 61–70	4–10	14 – Brumagin	6 – Hartsock, Pledger	4 – Day	FAU Arena (444); Boca Raton, FL
January 2, 2007*; 8:05 PM		at Utah Valley State	L 59–74	4–11	14 – Brumagin	6 – Hartscok, Pledger	4 – Day	McKay Events Center (833); Orem, UT
January 4, 2007*; 7:00 PM		Chicago State	W 86–78	5–11	20 – Ayuba	11 – Pledger	7 – Ayuba	Municipal Auditorium (1,217); Kansas City, MO
Conference Regular Season
January 6, 2007; 7:00 PM		Southern Utah	W 66–62	6–11 (1–0)	14 – Day, Pledger	7 – Ayuba, Day, Pledger	5 – Day	Municipal Auditorium (1,447); Kansas City, MO
January 11, 2007; 7:00 PM		Centenary	W 80–75	7–11 (2–0)	26 – Day	5 – Ayuba, Gettinger, Pledger	6 – Day	Municipal Auditorium (1,271); Kansas City, MO
January 13, 2007; 7:00 PM		Oral Roberts	L 68–75	7–12 (2–1)	18 – Johnson	5 – Brumagin	4 – Day	Municipal Auditorium (1,776); Kansas City, MO
January 18, 2007; 6:00 PM		at Indiana/Purdue–Indianapolis	L 72–77	7–13 (2–2)	28 – Brumagin	10 – Pledger	3 – Day	IUPUI Gymnasium (1,123); Indianapolis, IN
January 20, 2007; 5:00 PM		at Oakland	L 60–78	7–14 (2–3)	27 – Ayuba	7 – Pledger	4 – Day	Athletics Center O'rena (3,075); Auburn Hills, MI
January 25, 2007; 7:00 PM		Valparaiso	L 52–56 ^{OT}	7–15 (2–4)	17 – Ayuba, Day	8 – Brumagin	2 – Day	Kemper Arena (1,821); Kansas City, MO
January 27, 2007; 7:00 PM		Western Illinois	W 95–89 ^{2OT}	8–15 (3–4)	30 – Day	7 – Pledger	8 – Johnson	Kemper Arena (2,234); Kansas City, MO
February 2, 2007; 8:35 PM		at Southern Utah	L 59–66	8–16 (3–5)	16 – Ayuba	7 – Pledger	4 – Johnson	Centrum Arena (3,264); Cedar City, UT
February 8, 2007; 7:05 PM		at Oral Roberts	L 68–74	8–17 (3–6)	25 – Day	5 – Day	5 – Day	Mabee Center (5,682); Tulsa, OK
February 10, 2007; 7:00 PM		at Centenary	L 68–69	8–18 (3–7)	27 – Day	6 – Ayuba, Day	6 – Day	Gold Dome (597); Shreveport, LA
February 15, 2007; 7:00 PM		Oakland	W 80–76 ^{OT}	9–18 (4–7)	25 – Ayuba	10 – Gettinger	5 – Johnson	Kemper Arena (1,334); Kansas City, MO
February 17, 2007; 7:00 PM		Indiana/Purdue–Indianapolis	W 85–72	10–18 (5–7)	22 – Blackwell	8 – Day	6 – Ayuba	Kemper Arena (1,826); Kansas City, MO
February 22, 2007; 7:00 PM		at Western Illinois	W 89–54	11–18 (6–7)	16 – Ayuba	7 – Brumagin	6 – Day	Western Hall (1,068); Macomb, IL
February 24, 2007; 7:05 PM		at Valparaiso	L 61–77	11–19 (6–8)	19 – Stephens	5 – Ayuba, Hartsock, Stephens	4 – Day	Athletics–Recreation Center (3,297); Valparaiso, IN
Conference Tournament
March 4, 2007*; 8:30 PM	(6)	vs. (3) Valparaiso [Quarterfinal]	W 84–76	12–19	31 – Ayuba	8 – Ayuba	5 – Day	John Q. Hammons Arena (2,045); Tulsa, OK
March 5, 2007*; 8:30 PM	(6)	vs. (2) Oakland [Semifinal]	L 79–93	12–20	17 – Day	7 – Ayuba	7 – Day	John Q. Hammons Arena (4,147); Tulsa, OK
*Non-conference game. ^{#}Rankings from AP Poll. (#) Tournament seedings in parentheses. All times are in Central Standard Time (CST).
