= 2007 Mid-Continent Conference men's basketball tournament =

- Classification: Division I
- Season: 2006–07
- Teams: 8
- Site: Union Multipurpose Activity Center; Tulsa, Oklahoma
- Champions: Oral Roberts (2nd title)
- Winning coach: Scott Sutton (2nd title)
- Top scorer: Caleb Green (Oral Roberts) (78 points)
- Mid-Continent Conference men's basketball tournaments

2006–07 Mid-Continent Conference men's basketball standings
	Conf.				Overall
Team	W		L	PCT	W		L	PCT
Oral Roberts †	12	–	2	.857	23	–	11	.676
Oakland	10	–	4	.714	19	–	14	.576
Valparaiso	9	–	5	.643	16	–	15	.516
IUPUI	7	–	7	.500	15	–	15	.500
Southern Utah	6	–	8	.429	16	–	14	.533
UMKC	6	–	8	.429	12	–	20	.375
Western Illinois	3	–	11	.214	7	–	23	.233
Centenary	3	–	11	.214	10	–	21	.323
† 2007 Mid-Continent Tournament winner Rankings from AP Poll

The 2007 Mid-Continent Conference men's basketball tournament took place between Saturday, March 2, 2007 and Tuesday, March 5, 2007, at the John Q. Hammons Arena in Tulsa, Oklahoma.

The Oral Roberts Golden Eagles won the championship to secure their 4th trip to the NCAA Men's Division I Basketball Championship.

This was the conference's final tournament under the Mid-Continent Conference name. During the 2007 offseason, the MCC adopted its current name The Summit League.

== Format ==
Each of the 8 men's basketball teams in the Mid-Continent Conference received a berth in the conference tournament. Teams were seeded by conference record with the following tie-breakers:

- Head-to-head competition
- Winning percentage vs. ranked conference teams (starting with #1 and moving down until the tie is broken)
- Coin flip

== Seeding ==
The following were the seeds for the conference tournament, along with conference record.

1. Oral Roberts, 12–2
2. Oakland, 10–4
3. Valparaiso, 9–5
4. IUPUI, 7–7
5. Southern Utah, 6–8 *
6. UMKC, 6–8
7. Western Illinois, 3–11 **
8. Centenary, 3–11

* Received #5 seed based on 1–1 record vs. #3 Valparaiso while UMKC had an 0–2 record vs. Valparaiso. The teams split head-to-head and had identical records vs. #1 Oral Roberts (0–2) and #2 Oakland (0–2).
** Received #7 seed based on 1–1 record vs. #2 Oakland while Centenary had an 0–2 record vs. Oakland. The teams split head-to-head and had identical records vs. #1 Oral Roberts (0–2).

== Bracket ==
Quarterfinals
1	Oral Roberts	79
8	Centenary	59
4	IUPUI	71
5	Southern Utah	59
2	Oakland	74
7	Western Illinois	57
3	Valparaiso	76
6	UMKC	84

Semifinals
1	Oral Roberts	75
4	IUPUI	54
2	Oakland	83
6	UMKC	79

Final
1	Oral Roberts	71
2	Oakland	67
