= 2004–05 Oakland Golden Grizzlies men's basketball team =

American college basketball season

2004–05 Oakland Golden Grizzlies men's basketball

Mid-Con tournament champions

NCAA tournament, Round of 64
- Conference: The Summit League
- Record: 13–19 (7–9 Summit)
- Head coach: Greg Kampe (21st season)
- Assistant coaches: Jeff Tungate; Darren Sorenson; Saddi Washington
- Home arena: Athletics Center O'rena

2004–05 Mid-Continent Conference men's basketball standings
	Conf.				Overall
Team	W		L	PCT	W		L	PCT
Oral Roberts	13	–	3	.813	25	–	8	.758
UMKC	12	–	4	.750	16	–	12	.571
Valparaiso	10	–	6	.625	15	–	16	.484
IUPUI	9	–	7	.563	16	–	13	.552
Western Illinois	7	–	9	.438	11	–	17	.393
Chicago State	7	–	9	.438	9	–	19	.321
Oakland †	7	–	9	.438	13	–	19	.406
Southern Utah	6	–	10	.375	13	–	15	.464
Centenary	1	–	15	.063	3	–	24	.111
† 2005 Mid-Con Tournament winner Rankings from AP Poll

The 2004–05 Oakland Golden Grizzlies men's basketball team were a National Collegiate Athletic Association Division I college basketball team representing Oakland University as a member of the Mid-Continent Conference (Mid-Con). Oakland finished the season 13–19 overall, 7–9 in Mid-Con play to finish 7th in the regular season standings. The Golden Grizzlies surprised by winning the Mid-Con tournament to secure the conference's automatic bid to the NCAA tournament. Making their first NCAA tournament appearance in school history, Oakland was one of two No. 16 seeds in the Syracuse region. The team defeated fellow No. 16 seed Alabama A&M, 79–69, in the play-in game before losing to No. 1 seed and eventual National champion North Carolina in the round of 64.

== Roster ==
2004–05 Oakland Golden Grizzlies men's basketball team
Players	Coaches
Pos. / # / Name / Height / Weight / Year / Hometown; G / 1 / Rawle Marshall / 6 ft 7 in (2.01 m) / 190 lb (86 kg) / Sr	Head coach: Greg Kampe; Assistant coach(es) Legend: (C) Team captain; (S) Suspended; (I) Ineligible; (W) Walk-on; Injured; Current redshirt

== Schedule and results ==
Date time, TV	Rank^{#}	Opponent^{#}	Result	Record	Site (attendance) city, state
Regular season
Nov 19, 2004*		at Xavier	L 58–69	0–1	Cintas Center; Cincinnati, Ohio
Nov 24, 2004*		at No. 5 Illinois	L 54–85	0–2	Assembly Hall; Champaign, Illinois
Nov 27, 2004*		Marquette	L 87–95	0–3	Athletics Center O'rena; Auburn Hills, Michigan
Dec 1, 2004*		at Texas A&M	L 63–81	0–4	Reed Arena; College Station, Texas
Dec 4, 2004*		at Missouri	L 61–70	0–5	Mizzou Arena; Columbia, Missouri
Dec 6, 2004*		at Kansas State	L 69–76	0–6	Bramlage Coliseum; Manhattan, Kansas
Dec 15, 2004*		at Saint Louis	L 59–69	0–7	Savvis Center; St. Louis, Missouri
Dec 20, 2004*		North Dakota State	W 82–56	1–7	Athletics Center O'rena; Auburn Hills, Michigan
Dec 27, 2004*		at Akron	L 52–81	1–8	James A. Rhodes Arena; Akron, Ohio
Dec 30, 2004*		Bowling Green State	W 77–53	2–8	Athletics Center O'rena; Auburn Hills, Michigan
Jan 3, 2005		Centenary	W 93–83	3–8 (1–0)	Athletics Center O'rena; Auburn Hills, Michigan
Jan 8, 2005		at IUPUI	L 65–81	3–9 (1–1)	Indiana Farmers Coliseum; Indianapolis, Indiana
Jan 10, 2005		Valparaiso	L 78–87	3–10 (1–2)	Athletics Center O'rena; Auburn Hills, Michigan
Jan 15, 2005		Chicago State	W 74–61	4–10 (2–2)	Athletics Center O'rena; Auburn Hills, Michigan
Jan 20, 2005		at Oral Roberts	L 89–94	4–11 (2–3)	Mabee Center; Tulsa, Oklahoma
Jan 22, 2005		Southern Utah	W 81–60	5–11 (3–3)	Athletics Center O'rena; Auburn Hills, Michigan
Jan 24, 2005		at Valparaiso	L 71–82	5–12 (3–4)	Athletics-Recreation Center; Valparaiso, Indiana
Jan 29, 2005*		at No. 15 Michigan State	L 75–92	5–13	Breslin Student Events Center; East Lansing, Michigan
Feb 3, 2005		UMKC	L 76–83	5–14 (3–5)	Athletics Center O'rena; Auburn Hills, Michigan
Feb 5, 2005		at Western Illinois	W 72–67	6–14 (4–5)	Western Hall; Macomb, Illinois
Feb 10, 2005		at Southern Utah	L 65–67	6–15 (4–6)	America First Event Center; Cedar City, Utah
Feb 12, 2005		at UMKC	W 60–50	7–15 (5–6)	Swinney Recreation Center; Kansas City, Missouri
Feb 16, 2005		Oral Roberts	L 61–72	7–16 (5–7)	Athletics Center O'rena; Auburn Hills, Michigan
Feb 19, 2005		at Chicago State	L 62–73	7–17 (5–8)	Dickens Athletic Center; Chicago, Illinois
Feb 26, 2005		Western Illinois	L 74–75	7–18 (5–9)	Athletics Center O'rena; Auburn Hills, Michigan
Feb 26, 2005		IUPUI	W 94–89 ^{OT}	8–18 (6–9)	Athletics Center O'rena; Auburn Hills, Michigan
Feb 28, 2005		at Centenary	W 86–60	9–18 (7–9)	Gold Dome; Shreveport, Louisiana
Summit League tournament
Mar 5, 2005*		vs. UMKC; Quarterfinals	W 67–63	10–18	Union Multipurpose Activity Center; Tulsa, Oklahoma
Mar 7, 2005*		vs. Chicago State; Semifinals	W 56–53	11–18	Union Multipurpose Activity Center; Tulsa, Oklahoma
Mar 8, 2005*		vs. Oral Roberts; Championship game	W 61–60	12–18	Union Multipurpose Activity Center; Tulsa, Oklahoma
NCAA tournament
Mar 15, 2005*	(16 SYR)	vs. (16 SYR) Alabama A&M; Play-in game	W 79–69	13–18	UD Arena; Dayton, Ohio
Mar 18, 2005*	(16 SYR)	vs. (1 SYR) No. 2 North Carolina; First round	L 68–96	13–19	Charlotte Coliseum; Charlotte, North Carolina
*Non-conference game. ^{#}Rankings from AP Poll. (#) Tournament seedings in parentheses. SYR=Syracuse. All times are in Eastern Time.
