= 2006 Mid-Continent Conference men's basketball tournament =

- Classification: Division I
- Season: 2005–06
- Teams: 8
- Site: Union Multipurpose Activity Center; Tulsa, Oklahoma
- Champions: Oral Roberts (1st title)
- Winning coach: Scott Sutton (1st title)
- Mid-Continent Conference men's basketball tournaments

2005–06 Mid-Continent Conference men's basketball standings
| | Conf. | | | | Overall |
| Team | W | | L | PCT | W | | L | PCT |
|---|---|---|---|---|---|---|---|---|
| Oral Roberts † | 13 | – | 3 | .813 | 21 | – | 12 | .636 |
| IUPUI | 13 | – | 3 | .813 | 19 | – | 10 | .655 |
| UMKC | 11 | – | 5 | .688 | 14 | – | 14 | .500 |
| Valparaiso | 8 | – | 8 | .500 | 17 | – | 12 | .586 |
| Southern Utah | 8 | – | 8 | .500 | 10 | – | 20 | .333 |
| Chicago State | 8 | – | 8 | .500 | 11 | – | 19 | .367 |
| Oakland | 6 | – | 10 | .375 | 11 | – | 18 | .379 |
| Western Illinois | 3 | – | 13 | .188 | 7 | – | 21 | .250 |
| Centenary | 2 | – | 14 | .125 | 4 | – | 23 | .148 |
† 2006 Mid-Continent Tournament winner Rankings from AP Poll

The 2006 Mid-Continent Conference men's basketball tournament took place between Saturday, March 4, 2006 and Tuesday, March 7, 2006 at the John Q. Hammons Arena in Tulsa, Oklahoma.

== Bracket ==
Quarterfinals; March 4–5
1 | Oral Roberts | 60
8 | Western Illinois | 53
4 | Valparaiso | 77
5 | Southern Utah | 66
2 | IUPUI | 69
7 | Oakland | 63
3 | UMKC | 66
6 | Chicago State | 75

Semifinals; March 6
1 | Oral Roberts | 77
4 | Valparaiso | 58
2 | IUPUI | 53
6 | Chicago State | 57

Final; March 7
1 | Oral Roberts | 85
6 | Chicago State | 72

== See also ==
- Summit League men's basketball tournament
