= 2005–06 Oral Roberts Golden Eagles men's basketball team =

American college basketball season

2005–06 Oral Roberts Golden Eagles men's basketball

Mid-Continent tournament champions Mid-Continent Regular season champions

NCAA tournament, Round of 64
- Conference: Mid-Continent Conference
- Record: 21–12 (13–3 Mid-Con)
- Head coach: Scott Sutton (7th season)
- Assistant coaches: Tom Hankins; Conley Phipps
- Home arena: Mabee Center

2005–06 Mid-Continent Conference men's basketball standings
	Conf.				Overall
Team	W		L	PCT	W		L	PCT
Oral Roberts †	13	–	3	.813	21	–	12	.636
IUPUI	13	–	3	.813	19	–	10	.655
UMKC	11	–	5	.688	14	–	14	.500
Valparaiso	8	–	8	.500	17	–	12	.586
Southern Utah	8	–	8	.500	10	–	20	.333
Chicago State	8	–	8	.500	11	–	19	.367
Oakland	6	–	10	.375	11	–	18	.379
Western Illinois	3	–	13	.188	7	–	21	.250
Centenary	2	–	14	.125	4	–	23	.148
† 2006 Mid-Continent Tournament winner Rankings from AP Poll

The 2005–06 Oral Roberts Golden Eagles men's basketball team represented Oral Roberts University during the 2005–06 NCAA Division I men's basketball season. The Golden Eagles, led by 7th year head coach Scott Sutton, played their home games at the Mabee Center and were members of Mid-Continent Conference. They finished the season 21–12, 13–3 in league play to be crowned regular season champions. They won the Mid-Continent Conference tournament to receive an automatic bid to the NCAA tournament as No. 16 seed in the Oakland region. The Golden Eagles lost to No. 1 seed Memphis in the opening round.

== Roster ==
2005–06 Oral Roberts Golden Eagles men's basketball team
Players
Coaches

Pos.	#	Name	Height	Weight	Year	Previous school	Hometown
G	1	Ken Tutt	6 ft 1 in (1.85 m)	200 lb (91 kg)	Jr	South Garland	Garland, Texas
G	2	Chris Riouse	6 ft 2 in (1.88 m)	200 lb (91 kg)	Sr		Broken Arrow, Oklahoma
G	3	Ben Haynes	6 ft 2 in (1.88 m)	180 lb (82 kg)	RS Fr	Pullman	Pullman, Washington
G/F	3	Yemi Ogunoye	6 ft 9 in (2.06 m)	210 lb (95 kg)	So	Cedar Hill	Cedar Hill, Texas
G/F	4	Larry Owens	6 ft 7 in (2.01 m)	205 lb (93 kg)	Sr	Westwood; Yavapai College	Mesa, Arizona
G	5	Luke Spencer-Gardner	6 ft 1 in (1.85 m)	190 lb (86 kg)	RS Sr		Melbourne, Australia
G	10	Mike Morgan	6 ft 3 in (1.91 m)	180 lb (82 kg)	RS So	Hononegah Community	Rockford, Illinois
F	10	Marchello Vealy	6 ft 7 in (2.01 m)	215 lb (98 kg)	RS Fr	Southeast	Oklahoma City, Oklahoma
G	11	Adam Liberty	6 ft 2 in (1.88 m)	180 lb (82 kg)	Jr	John Marshall; Wichita State	Oklahoma City, Oklahoma
F	13	Moses Ehambe	6 ft 5 in (1.96 m)	200 lb (91 kg)	So	Mansfield Summit	Arlington, Texas
G	14	Jonathan Bluitt	5 ft 9 in (1.75 m)	165 lb (75 kg)	Sr	Bishop McGuinness Catholic	Oklahoma City, Oklahoma
F/C	21	Schuyler Thomas	6 ft 9 in (2.06 m)	220 lb (100 kg)	RS Sr	Peach County; Cowley Community College	Fort Valley, Georgia
G/F	22	Eric Fowlkes	6 ft 4 in (1.93 m)	200 lb (91 kg)	Sr	Bay View; Colby Community College	Milwaukee, Wisconsin
G	23	Daren Jordan	5 ft 11 in (1.8 m)	165 lb (75 kg)	Fr	Trevor G. Browne	Phoenix, Arizona
F	30	Caleb Green	6 ft 8 in (2.03 m)	255 lb (116 kg)	Jr	Tulsa Memorial	Tulsa, Oklahoma
G/F	33	Andrew Meloy	6 ft 5 in (1.96 m)	200 lb (91 kg)	Sr	Sweetwater Christian	Houston, Texas
F	42	Sylvester Spicer	6 ft 6 in (1.98 m)	230 lb (104 kg)	Fr	South Oak Cliff	Dallas, Texas
C	45	Mickey Michalec	6 ft 11 in (2.11 m)	280 lb (127 kg)	Sr	Skiatook; Texas Tech	Skiatook, Oklahoma
C	51	Matt Gastel	6 ft 11 in (2.11 m)	230 lb (104 kg)	RS Sr	Jenks	Tulsa, Oklahoma

Head coach

- Scott Sutton (Oklahoma State)

Assistant coach(es)

- Tom Hankins (Northeastern State)

Legend

- (C) Team captain
- (S) Suspended
- (I) Ineligible
- (W) Walk-on
- Injured
- Current redshirt

Roster

== Schedule and results ==
Date time, TV	Rank^{#}	Opponent^{#}	Result	Record	Site (attendance) city, state
Non-Conference regular season
Nov 19, 2005*		Utah State	L 67–72 ^{OT}	0–1	Mabee Center; Tulsa, Oklahoma
Nov 23, 2005*		vs. USC; Great Alaska Shootout	W 68–48	1–1	Sullivan Arena; Anchorage, Alaska
Nov 25, 2005*		vs. Marquette; Great Alaska Shootout	L 70–73	1–2	Sullivan Arena; Anchorage, Alaska
Nov 26, 2005*		vs. Monmouth; Great Alaska Shootout	W 62–54	2–2	Sullivan Arena; Anchorage, Alaska
Mid-Con Conference regular season
Feb 25, 2006		Valparaiso	W 87–78	18–11 (13–3)	Mabee Center; Tulsa, Oklahoma
Mid-Con Conference tournament
Mar 4, 2006*		vs. Western Illinois; Quarterfinals	W 60–53	19–11	Union Multipurpose Activity Center; Tulsa, Oklahoma
Mar 6, 2006*		vs. Valparaiso; Semifinals	W 77–58	20–11	Union Multipurpose Activity Center; Tulsa, Oklahoma
Mar 7, 2006*		vs. Chicago State; Championship game	W 85–72	21–11	Union Multipurpose Activity Center; Tulsa, Oklahoma
NCAA tournament
Mar 17, 2006*	(16 OAK)	vs. (1 OAK) No. 4 Memphis; First round	L 78–94	21–12	American Airlines Center (19,028); Dallas, Texas
*Non-conference game. ^{#}Rankings from AP poll. (#) Tournament seedings in parentheses. OAK=Oakland. All times are in Central Time.
