= 2003–04 UMKC Kangaroos men's basketball team =

American college basketball season

2003–04 UMKC Kangaroos men's basketball
- Conference: Mid–Continent Conference
- Record: 15–14 (9–7 Mid–Con)
- Head coach: Rich Zvosec (3rd season)
- Associate head coach: Ken Dempsey (3rd season)
- Assistant coaches: Jason Ivey (4th season); Marc Stricker (1st season)
- Home arena: Municipal Auditorium, Hale Arena, Kemper Arena

2003–04 Mid-Continent Conference men's basketball standings
| | Conf. | | | | Overall |
| Team | W | | L | PCT | W | | L | PCT |
|---|---|---|---|---|---|---|---|---|
| Valparaiso † | 11 | – | 5 | .688 | 18 | – | 13 | .581 |
| IUPUI | 10 | – | 6 | .625 | 21 | – | 11 | .656 |
| Centenary | 10 | – | 6 | .625 | 16 | – | 12 | .571 |
| Oral Roberts | 10 | – | 6 | .625 | 17 | – | 11 | .607 |
| UMKC | 9 | – | 7 | .563 | 15 | – | 14 | .517 |
| Chicago State | 9 | – | 7 | .563 | 12 | – | 20 | .375 |
| Southern Utah | 6 | – | 10 | .375 | 10 | – | 18 | .357 |
| Oakland | 6 | – | 10 | .375 | 13 | – | 17 | .433 |
| Western Illinois | 1 | – | 15 | .063 | 3 | – | 25 | .107 |
† 2004 Mid-Con Tournament winner Rankings from AP Poll

The 2003–04 UMKC Kangaroos men's basketball team represented the University of Missouri–Kansas City during the 2003–04 NCAA Division I men's basketball season. The Kangaroos played their home games off-campus, most at Municipal Auditorium (with one at Hale Arena and one at Kemper Arena) in Kansas City, Missouri, as a member of the Mid–Continent Conference.

== Previous season ==
The Kangaroos finished the 2002–03 season with a record of 9–20 overall, 7–7 in the Mid–Continent Conference to finish in fifth place.

== Roster ==
2003–04 UMKC Kangaroos men's basketball team
Players
Coaches

| Pos. | # | Name | Height | Weight | Year | Previous school | Hometown |
|---|---|---|---|---|---|---|---|
| G | 11 | Javon Clark | 6 ft 1 in (1.85 m) | 180 lb (82 kg) | Sr | | Detroit, MI |
| F | 22 | Michael Watson | 6 ft 4 in (1.93 m) | 185 lb (84 kg) | Sr | Central HS | Kansas City, MO |
| C | 32 | Carlton Aaron | 6 ft 9 in (2.06 m) | 322 lb (146 kg) | RS Jr | Temple; The Winchendon/ Atlantic Shores Christian | Bronx, NY |
| F | 42 | Mike English | 6 ft 4 in (1.93 m) | 225 lb (102 kg) | Jr | Kaskaskia/ Lincoln Trail; Jennings Senior & College Prep | St. Louis, MO |
| C | 54 | Dan Leadbetter (injured) (redshirt) | 6 ft 10 in (2.08 m) | 265 lb (120 kg) | Jr | Abingdon–Avon HS | Abingdon, IL |
| F | 25 | Corey Starks | 6 ft 5 in (1.96 m) | 230 lb (104 kg) | Jr | Chaffey; Rancho Cucamonga HS | Rancho, Cucomonga, CA |
| G | 3 | Brandon Temple | 6 ft 1 in (1.85 m) | 180 lb (82 kg) | Jr | Missouri State–West Plains; Wake Forest–Rolesville HS | Raleigh, NC |
| F | 15 | Brandon Lipsey | 6 ft 8 in (2.03 m) | 200 lb (91 kg) | RS So | Sumner Arts And Science | Kansas City, KS |
| G | 21 | Mark Huppe | 6 ft 2 in (1.88 m) | 185 lb (84 kg) | So | Truman State; Saint Thomas Aquinas HS | Overland Park, KS |
| F | 45 | Blake Crawford | 6 ft 8 in (2.03 m) | 225 lb (102 kg) | Fr | Blue Valley North HS | Overland Park, KS |

Head coach

- Rich Zvosec (Defiance)

Assistant coach(es)

- Ken Dempsey (Moravian)
- Jason Ivey (Temple)
- Marc Stricker (Missouri–Kansas City)

Legend

- (C) Team captain
- (S) Suspended
- (I) Ineligible
- (W) Walk-on
- (5Y) Fifth-year Senior
- Injured
- Current redshirt

Roster
Last update: November 3, 2024

== Schedule & Results ==
| Date time, TV | Rank^{#} | Opponent^{#} | Result | Record | High points | High rebounds | High assists | Site (attendance) city, state |
Regular Season
| November 17, 2003*; 7:00 PM | | at Minnesota; Preseason NIT [Opening Round] | L 67–78 | 0–1 | 16 – English | 12 – English | 7 – Watson | Williams Arena (10,797); Minneapolis, MN |
| November 29, 2003*; 7:00 PM | | Norfolk State | W 80–56 | 1–1 | 19 – Watson | 12 – Aaron | 8 – Temple | Municipal Auditorium (1,842); Kansas City, MO |
| December 2, 2003*; 7:00 PM | | Loyola–Chicago | L 75–83 | 1–2 | 20 – English | 12 – English | 7 – Temple | Municipal Auditorium (1,745); Kansas City, MO |
| December 4, 2003*; 7:00 PM | | Texas–Pan American | W 104–80 | 2–2 | 27 – Watson | 7 – English, Starks | 4 – Watson | Municipal Auditorium (1,822); Kansas City, MO |
| December 6, 2003*; 7:30 PM | | at Southeast Missouri State | L 63–80 | 2–3 | 22 – Watson | 7 – English | 2 – Watson, Temple | Show Me Center (3,851); Cape Girardeau, MO |
| December 10, 2003*; 7:00 PM | | Denver | W 72–68 | 3–3 | 37 – Watson | 8 – Starks | 4 – Watson | Municipal Auditorium (1,115); Kansas City, MO |
| December 13, 2003*; 6:00 PM | | at Monmouth | L 67–82 | 3–4 | 20 – Watson, Lipsey | 10 – Lipsey | 4 – Temple | William T. Boylan Gymnasium (1,927); West Long Branch, NJ |
| December 17, 2003*; 7:00 PM | | Southwest Missouri State | L 77–80 ^{2OT} | 3–5 | 29 – Watson | 12 – English | 5 – Watson | Municipal Auditorium (2,545); Kansas City, MO |
| December 22, 2003*; 6:00 PM | | at Youngstown State | L 65–73 | 3–6 | 36 – Watson | 9 – English | 5 – Lipsey | Beeghly Physical Education Center (1,644); Youngstown, OH |
| December 30, 2003*; 7:00 PM | | Kansas State | W 93–52 | 4–6 | 18 – Watson, English | 7 – Watson, English, Lipsey | 6 – English, Temple | Municipal Auditorium (7,842); Kansas City, MO |
| January 3, 2004; 7:00 PM | | Oral Roberts | L 62–76 | 4–7 (0–1) | 19 – English | 7 – English | 7 – Temple | Municipal Auditorium (3,242); Kansas City, MO |
| January 5, 2004; 7:30 PM | | at Chicago State | W 84–66 | 5–7 (1–1) | 29 – Lipsey | 11 – Aaron | 5 – English, Starks | Jacoby D. Dickens Physical; Education and Athletics Center (410); Chicago, IL |
| January 8, 2004; 7:00 PM | | Valparaiso | W 60–59 | 6–7 (2–1) | 18 – Watson | 11 – Lipsey | 3 – Watson, Temple | Municipal Auditorium (2,221); Kansas City, MO |
| January 10, 2004; 7:00 PM | | Centenary | W 62–57 | 7–7 (3–1) | 22 – Watson | 9 – English | 5 – English | Municipal Auditorium (3,422); Kansas City, MO |
| January 15, 2004; 7:00 PM | | Western Illinois | W 85–50 | 8–7 (4–1) | 21 – Watson | 10 – Aaron | 8 – English | Kemper Arena (2,832); Kansas City, MO |
| January 19, 2004*; 7:30 PM | | Texas–Pan American | W 77–69 | 9–7 | 30 – Watson | 7 – English | 6 – Temple | UTPA Fieldhouse (1,350); Edinburg, TX |
| January 22, 2004; 7:00 PM | | Indiana/Purdue–Indianapolis | L 83–91 | 9–8 (4–2) | 27 – Watson | 7 – Lipsey | 5 – Watson, Temple | Hale Arena (2,932); Kansas City, MO |
| January 24, 2004; 5:00 PM | | at Oakland | L 67–82 | 9–9 (4–3) | 15 – Watson, English | 5 – English | 2 – Watson | Athletics Center O'rena (2,115); Auburn Hills, MI |
| January 29, 2004; 8:05 PM | | at Southern Utah | L 63–73 | 9–10 (4–4) | 27 – Watson | 5 – English | 6 – English | Centrum Arena (2,217); Cedar City, UT |
| January 31, 2004; 7:05 PM | | at Oral Roberts | W 77–71 | 10–10 (5–4) | 27 – Watson | 7 – Lipsey | 3 – Watson, English | Mabee Center (6,244); Tulsa, OK |
| February 7, 2004; 7:00 PM | | Oakland | W 88–58 | 11–10 (6–4) | 40 – Watson | 11 – Starks | 5 – Temple | Municipal Auditorium (3,822); Kansas City, MO |
| February 12, 2004; 7:00 PM | | at Western Illinois | W 78–71 | 12–10 (7–4) | 26 – Watson | 5 – Starks | 6 – Temple | Western Hall (1,102); Macomb, IL |
| February 14, 2004; 7:00 PM | | at Valparaiso | L 60–70 | 12–11 (7–5) | 20 – Watson | 8 – Lipsey, Temple | 5 – Watson, Temple | Athletics–Recreation Center (4,214); Valparaiso, IN |
| February 19, 2004; 7:05 PM | | at Centenary | L 55–63 | 12–12 (7–6) | 28 – Watson | 6 – Starks | 2 – Watson, English | Gold Dome (1,918); Shreveport, LA |
| February 21, 2004; 7:00 PM | | Chicago State | L 65–66 | 12–13 (7–7) | 17 – Watson | 14 – English | 5 – English | Municipal Auditorium (4,542); Kansas City, MO |
| February 26, 2004; 7:00 PM | | Southern Utah | W 74–62 | 13–13 (8–7) | 31 – Watson | 7 – English | 4 – English, Temple | Municipal Auditorium (2,822); Kansas City, MO |
| February 28, 2004; 5:00 PM | | at Indiana/Purdue–Indianapolis | W 73–68 ^{OT} | 14–13 (9–7) | 19 – Aaron | 17 – English | 6 – Watson | IUPUI Gymnasium (2,000); Indianapolis, IN |
Conference Tournament
| March 7, 2004*; 2:15 PM | (5) | vs. (4) Oral Roberts [Quarterfinal] | W 86–73 | 15–13 | 30 – Watson | 11 – Starks | 6 – Watson | Kemper Arena (2,622); Kansas City, MO |
| March 8, 2004*; 6:00 PM | (5) | vs. (1) Valparaiso [Semifinal] | L 78–90 | 15–14 | 28 – Watson | 10 – English | 6 – Watson | Kemper Arena (3,812); Kansas City, MO |
*Non-conference game. ^{#}Rankings from AP Poll. (#) Tournament seedings in parentheses. All times are in Central Standard Time (CST).
