= 2005 Mid-Continent Conference men's basketball tournament =

- Classification: Division I
- Season: 2004–05
- Teams: 8
- Site: Union Multipurpose Activity Center; Tulsa, Oklahoma
- Champions: Oakland (1st title)
- Winning coach: Greg Kampe (1st title)
- Mid-Continent Conference men's basketball tournaments

2004–05 Mid-Continent Conference men's basketball standings
	Conf.				Overall
Team	W		L	PCT	W		L	PCT
Oral Roberts	13	–	3	.813	25	–	8	.758
UMKC	12	–	4	.750	16	–	12	.571
Valparaiso	10	–	6	.625	15	–	16	.484
IUPUI	9	–	7	.563	16	–	13	.552
Western Illinois	7	–	9	.438	11	–	17	.393
Chicago State	7	–	9	.438	9	–	19	.321
Oakland †	7	–	9	.438	13	–	19	.406
Southern Utah	6	–	10	.375	13	–	15	.464
Centenary	1	–	15	.063	3	–	24	.111
† 2005 Mid-Con Tournament winner Rankings from AP Poll

The 2005 Mid-Continent Conference men's basketball tournament took place between Saturday, March 5, 2006 and Tuesday, March 8, 2006 at the John Q. Hammons Arena in Tulsa, Oklahoma.

== Bracket ==
Quarterfinals; March 5–6
1	Oral Roberts	82
8	Southern Utah	59
4	IUPUI	70
5	Western Illinois	62
2	UMKC	63
7	Oakland	67
3	Valparaiso	67
6	Chicago State	72

Semifinals; March 7
1	Oral Roberts	80
4	IUPUI	69
7	Oakland	56
6	Chicago State	53

Final; March 8
1	Oral Roberts	60
7	Oakland	61

== Championship game ==
On March 8, Oakland clinched their first-ever bid to the NCAA tournament – it was their eighth year in Division I – by dispatching league favorite Oral Roberts in their conference tournament final. The final score was 61–60. Pierre Dukes was the hero, hitting a 3-pointer with 1.3 seconds left. It was his only shot of the second half. Afterwards, Ken Tutt's desperation shot at the buzzer banked high off the rim and Oakland celebrated. After the game, Dukes said, "When I got it, I looked at the clock and there wasn't enough time to get it back to him, so I figured I'd let it fly." He was referring to Rawle Marshall who passed it to him for the winning shot. Dukes was shooting 35 percent from 3-point range and almost didn't even make the team.

Cortney Scott had 19 points for Oakland, while Marshall scored 18. Caleb Green had 13 points for the Oral Roberts Golden Eagles in the loss, while Tutt added 12. While the Golden Eagles did lead at half time, 28–27, the Golden Grizzlies went on a 17–6 run to begin the second half, and Oral Roberts had to claw their way back to have the lead in the closing seconds.

The Golden Grizzlies started the season with seven consecutive losses and had the fourth-hardest non-conference strength of schedule at the end of the season. At 12–18, they had the worst record of any qualifier to the NCAA tournament. They won the play-in game against Alabama A&M, then lost to North Carolina in the first round.

== See also ==
- The Summit League men's basketball tournament
