= 2004 Mid-Continent Conference men's basketball tournament =

- Classification: Division I
- Season: 2003–04
- Teams: 8
- Site: Kemper Arena; Kansas City, Missouri
- Champions: Valparaiso (8th title)
- Winning coach: Homer Drew (8th title)
- Mid-Continent Conference men's basketball tournaments

2003–04 Mid-Continent Conference men's basketball standings
	Conf.				Overall
Team	W		L	PCT	W		L	PCT
Valparaiso †	11	–	5	.688	18	–	13	.581
IUPUI	10	–	6	.625	21	–	11	.656
Centenary	10	–	6	.625	16	–	12	.571
Oral Roberts	10	–	6	.625	17	–	11	.607
UMKC	9	–	7	.563	15	–	14	.517
Chicago State	9	–	7	.563	12	–	20	.375
Southern Utah	6	–	10	.375	10	–	18	.357
Oakland	6	–	10	.375	13	–	17	.433
Western Illinois	1	–	15	.063	3	–	25	.107
† 2004 Mid-Con Tournament winner Rankings from AP Poll

The 2004 Mid-Continent Conference men's basketball tournament was held March 7–9, 2004 at Kemper Arena in Kansas City, Missouri. The tournament was won by Valparaiso, who defeated IUPUI in the championship game.

== Bracket ==
Quarterfinals; March 7
1	Valparaiso	73
8	Oakland	64
4	Oral Roberts	73
5	UMKC	86
2	IUPUI	74
7	Southern Utah	60
3	Centenary	54
6	Chicago State	70

Semifinals; March 8
1	Valparaiso	90
5	UMKC	78
2	IUPUI	68
6	Chicago State	47

Final; March 9
1	Valparaiso	75
2	IUPUI	70

== See also ==
- The Summit League men's basketball tournament
