= Centenary Gentlemen and Ladies =

- University: Centenary College of Louisiana
- Nickname: Gentlemen and Ladies
- NCAA: Division III
- Conference: SCAC
- Athletic director: Interim
- Location: Shreveport, Louisiana
- Varsity teams: 17
- Football stadium: Mayo Field
- Basketball arena: Gold Dome
- Baseball stadium: Shehee Stadium
- Softball stadium: Centenary Softball Complex
- Tennis venue: Centenary Tennis Courts
- Other venues: Haynes Fitness Center
- Colors: Maroon and white
- Website: www.gocentenary.com
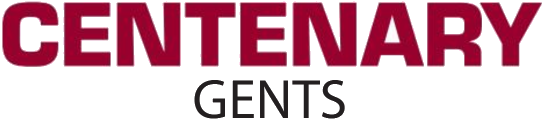

The Centenary Gentlemen and Ladies are composed of 20 teams representing Centenary College of Louisiana in intercollegiate athletics, including men and women's basketball, cross country, golf, soccer, and swimming. Men's sports include football, baseball and lacrosse. Women's sports include gymnastics, softball, and volleyball. The Gentlemen and Ladies compete in the NCAA Division III and are members of the Southern Collegiate Athletic Conference. Prior to 2011, Centenary was a member of the NCAA Division I, and competed in the Summit League.

The first official records of athletic teams at Centenary College are to be found in the 1908–1909 college catalog and the November 1909 issue of the Maroon and White, a monthly publication edited by the students.

U.S. Olympics Women's Gymnastics Coach (Tokyo, 1964) Vannie Edwards coached the Centenary women's gymnastics team from 1964 to 1968 and again from 1977 to 1985. Coach Edwards was also the team manager for the U.S. Olympics Women's Gymnastics teams in 1968 (Mexico City) and 1972 (Munich). He was inducted into the U.S. Gymnastics Hall of Fame in 1986.

== Sports sponsored ==
Men's sports	Women's sports
Baseball	Basketball
Basketball	Cross country
Cross country	Golf
Football	Gymnastics
Golf	Soccer
Lacrosse	Softball
Soccer	Swimming
Swimming	Tennis
Tennis	Volleyball

Centenary College sponsors nine men's and nine women's team in NCAA sanctioned sports.

=== Baseball ===
The baseball team represents Centenary College. The school's team currently competes in the Southern Collegiate Athletic Conference, which is part of the NCAA Division III. The team plays home games at the Shehee Stadium.

=== Men's basketball ===
The basketball team represents Centenary College. The school's team currently competes in the Southern Collegiate Athletic Conference, which is part of the NCAA Division III. The team plays home games at the Gold Dome.

=== Women's basketball ===
The Ladies basketball team represents Centenary College. The school's team currently competes in the Southern Collegiate Athletic Conference, which is part of the NCAA Division III. The team plays home games at the Gold Dome.

=== Football ===
Centenary fielded a college football team until 1941. The program was discontinued during World War II due to budget deficits and declining fan interest. An effort to revive the team in 1947 was unsuccessful, In 2023, Centenary reinstated their football team for the first time in seven decades.

=== Gymnastics ===
Gymnastics competes in Division I as a member of the Midwest Independent Conference.

== Facilities ==
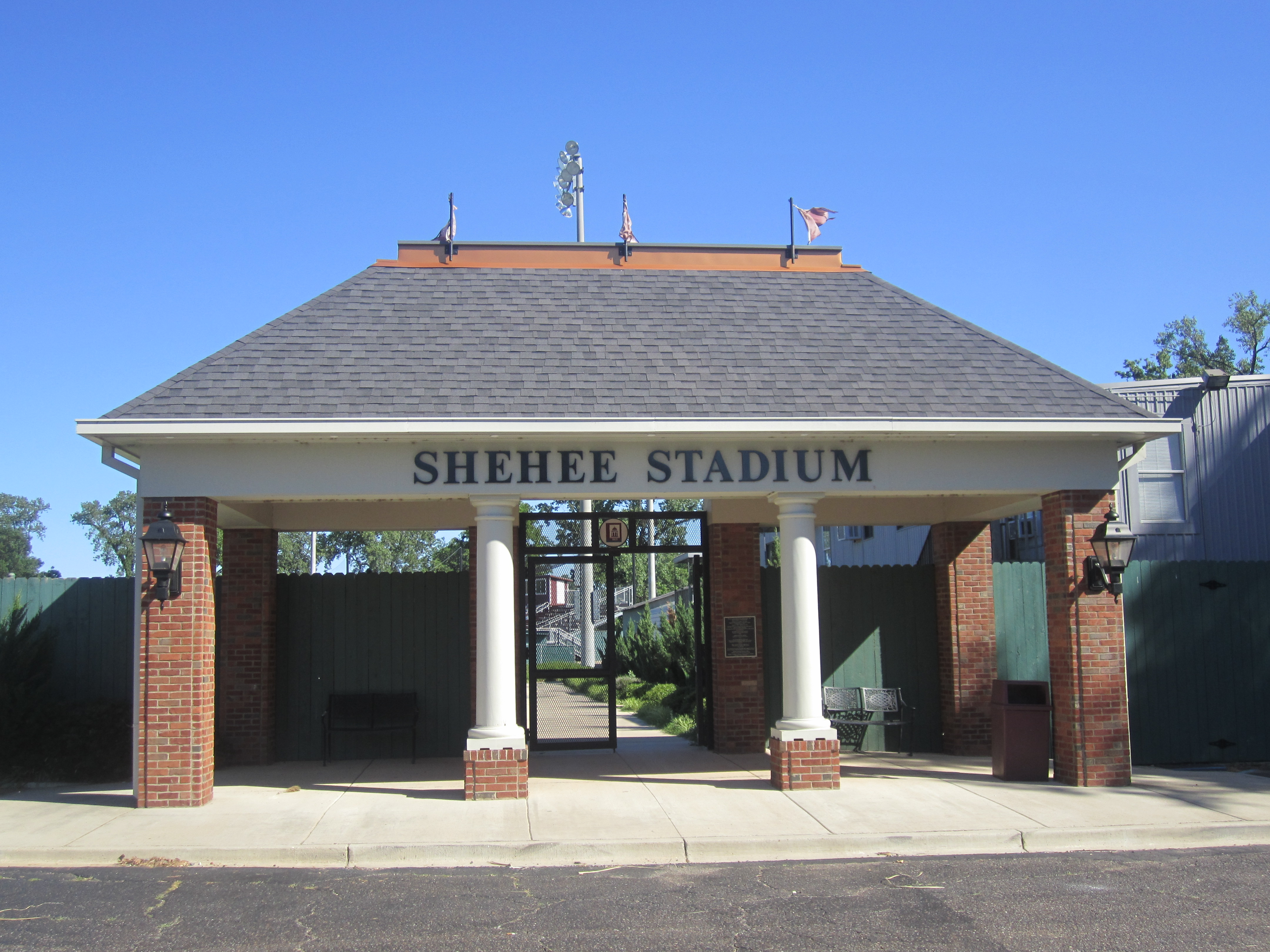
Entrance to Shehee Stadium, baseball venue

Venue	Sport(s)	Ref.
Mayo Field	Football; Lacrosse; Soccer	
Gold Dome	Basketball; Volleyball; Gymnastics	
Shehee Stadium	Baseball	
Centenary Courts	Tennis	
