= 2000–01 UMKC Kangaroos men's basketball team =

American college basketball season

2000–01 UMKC Kangaroos men's basketball
- Conference: Mid–Continent Conference
- Record: 14–16 (9–7 Mid–Con)
- Head coach: Dean Demopoulos (1st season)
- Associate head coach: Rich Zvosec (1st season)
- Assistant coach: Jason Ivey (1st season)
- Home arena: Municipal Auditorium, Hale Arena

2000–01 Mid-Continent Conference men's basketball standings
	Conf.				Overall
Team	W		L	PCT	W		L	PCT
Valparaiso	13	–	3	.813	24	–	8	.750
Southern Utah †	13	–	3	.813	25	–	6	.806
Youngstown State	11	–	5	.688	19	–	11	.633
UMKC	9	–	7	.563	14	–	16	.467
Oakland	8	–	8	.500	12	–	16	.429
IUPUI	6	–	10	.375	11	–	18	.379
Oral Roberts	5	–	11	.313	10	–	19	.345
Western Illinois	5	–	11	.313	5	–	23	.179
Chicago State	2	–	14	.125	5	–	23	.179
† 2001 Mid-Con Tournament winner

The 2000–01 UMKC Kangaroos men's basketball team represented the University of Missouri–Kansas City during the 2000–01 NCAA Division I men's basketball season. The Kangaroos played their home games off-campus, most at Municipal Auditorium (with one at Hale Arena) in Kansas City, Missouri, as a member of the Mid–Continent Conference.

== Previous season ==
The Kangaroos finished the 1999–2000 season with a record of 16–13 overall, 10–6 in the Mid–Continent Conference to finish in a tie for second place.

== Roster ==
2000–01 UMKC Kangaroos men's basketball team
Players
Coaches

Pos.	#	Name	Height	Weight	Year	Previous school	Hometown
G	10	Faress Berhe	6 ft 3 in (1.91 m)	—	Sr		Olathe, KS
F	52	Myron Brown	6 ft 7 in (2.01 m)	—	Sr
G	3	Terrance Chatman	5 ft 11 in (1.8 m)	—	Sr	Idaho/ Garden City CC; Frank Cody HS	Detroit, MI
G	4	Marcus Golson	6 ft 8 in (2.03 m)	195 lb (88 kg)	Jr	Butler County CC/ Baylor; Blue Valley Northwest HS	Kansas City, KS
G	30	Michael Jackson	6 ft 7 in (2.01 m)	215 lb (98 kg)	Jr	Butler County CC; Blue Valley Northwest HS	Overland Park, KS
G	40	Will Palmer	6 ft 7 in (2.01 m)	235 lb (107 kg)	Jr	Truman HS	Independence, MO
G	32	Marc Stricker	6 ft 4 in (1.93 m)	190 lb (86 kg)	Jr	Christian Brothers College HS	St. Louis, MO
G	11	Matt Suther	6 ft 4 in (1.93 m)	195 lb (88 kg)	Jr	Butler County CC; Frankfort HS	Frankfort, KS
G	5	Randall Atchison	6 ft 5 in (1.96 m)	202 lb (92 kg)	So	Piper HS	Fort Lauderdale, FL
G	31	Cory Jones (redshirt)	6 ft 4 in (1.93 m)	—	So	North Little Rock HS	North Little Rock, AR
G	12	Javin Tindall	5 ft 11 in (1.8 m)	—	Fr	Wichita North HS	Wichita, KS
F	22	Michael Watson	6 ft 4 in (1.93 m)	185 lb (84 kg)	Fr	Central HS	Kansas City, MO

Head coach

- Dean Demopoulos (West Chester)

Assistant coach(es)

- Rich Zvosec (Defiance)
- Jason Ivey (Temple)

Legend

- (C) Team captain
- (S) Suspended
- (I) Ineligible
- (W) Walk-on
- (5Y) Fifth-year Senior
- Injured
- Current redshirt

Roster
Last update: November 3, 2024

== Schedule & Results ==
Date time, TV	Rank^{#}	Opponent^{#}	Result	Record	High points	High rebounds	High assists	Site (attendance) city, state
Regular Season
November 16, 2000*; 3:00 PM		at Morris Brown	L 62–70	0–1	14 – Jackson	6 – Suther	4 – Chatman	John H. Lewis Gymnasium (1,200); Atlanta, GA
November 21, 2000*; 8:30 PM		vs. Oklahoma State	L 46–69	0–2	10 – Watson	6 – Jackson, Suther	3 – Chatman	Mabee Center (6,381); Tulsa, OK
November 24, 2000*; 6:30 PM		Providence; Energia Systems Thanksgiving Tournament [Quarterfinal]	L 53–60	0–3	16 – Watson	6 – Suther	4 – Watson	Municipal Auditorium (5,134); Kansas City, MO
November 25, 2000*; 4:30 PM		Cleveland State; Energia Systems Thanksgiving Tournament [Consolation Semifinal]	L 55–57	0–4	17 – Jackson	14 – Palmer	4 – Tindall	Municipal Auditorium; Kansas City, MO
November 26, 2000*; 11:00 AM		Robert Morris; Energia Systems Thanksgiving Tournament [Seventh Place]	W 78–51	1–4	16 – Suther	5 – Palmer, Suther, Watson	6 – Watson	Municipal Auditorium; Kansas City, MO
November 29, 2000*; 7:00 PM		Delaware State	W 73–49	2–4	21 – Jackson	9 – Suther	7 – Tindall	Municipal Auditorium (1,543); Kansas City, MO
December 2, 2000; 4:00 PM		Southern Utah	W 67–47	3–4 (1–0)	20 – Watson	7 – Suther	5 – Palmer, Tindall	Municipal Auditorium (1,665); Kansas City, MO
December 8, 2000*; 6:30 PM		Nebraska; Husker Team Classic [Semifinal]	W 82–71	4–4	25 – Jackson	9 – Palmer	6 – Tindall	Bob Devaney Sports Center (6,851); Lincoln, NE
December 9, 2000*; 8:30 PM		vs. Pacific; Husker Team Classic [Final]	L 56–59	4–5	19 – Watson	4 – Jackson,,Palmer, Atchison	3 – Suther, Tindall	Bob Devaney Sports Center; Lincoln, NE
December 12, 2000*; 8:00 PM		at Colorado	L 64–80	4–6	20 – Watson	10 – Palmer	4 – Tindall	Coors Events/Conference Center (3,091); Boulder, CO
December 16, 2000*; 7:00 PM		Texas–Arlington	W 70–65	5–6	24 – Watson	9 – Palmer	5 – Suther	Municipal Auditorium (2,172); Kansas City, MO
December 20, 2000*; 7:05 PM		at Southwest Missouri State	L 58–70	5–7	18 – Jackson	4 – Palmer. Suther	3 – Tindall, Watson	John Q. Hammons; Student Center (5,864); Springfield, MO
December 30, 2000*; 7:05 PM		at Arkansas–Little Rock	L 53–59	5–8	15 – Watson	5 – Watson	2 – Jackson, Suther	Alltel Arena (2,567); North Little Rock, AR
January 4, 2001		at Youngstown State	L 63–75	5–9 (1–1)	20 – Jackson	5 – Jackson	5 – Tindall	Beeghly Physical Education Center (1,653); Youngstown, OH
January 6, 2001; 7:00 PM		Oakland	L 57–70	5–10 (1–2)	27 – Jackson	10 – Jackson	6 – Tindall	Municipal Auditorium (3,158); Kansas City, MO
January 11, 2001; 7:00 PM		at Western Illinois	W 64–41	6–10 (2–2)	23 – Jackson	9 – Jackson	3 – Suther	Western Hall (1,014); Macomb, IL
January 13, 2001; 4:00 PM		at Chicago State	W 60–57	7–10 (3–2)	24 – Watson	4 – Jackson, Watson	4 – Tindall, Watson	Jacoby D. Dickens Physical; Education and Athletics Center (592); Chicago, IL
January 20, 2001; 7:00 PM		Valparaiso	L 61–74	7–11 (3–3)	16 – Jackson	5 – Suther	7 – Watson	Hale Arena (2,183); Kansas City, MO
January 25, 2001; 8:35 PM		at Southern Utah	L 50–61	7–12 (3–4)	16 – Jackson	9 – Palmer, Suther	5 – Tindall	Centrum Arena (2,906); Cedar City, UT
January 27, 2001; 7:05 PM		at Oral Roberts	W 71–48	8–12 (4–4)	19 – Jackson	7 – Palmer, Suther	2 – Suther	Mabee Center (5,109); Tulsa, OK
February 1, 2001; 6:35 PM		at Indiana/Purdue–Indianapolis	W 58–56	9–12 (5–4)	17 – Jackson	5 – Jackson	5 – Jackson	IUPUI Gymnasium; Indianapolis, IN
February 3, 2001; 7:35 PM		at Valparaiso	L 61–72	9–13 (5–5)	15 – Palmer	8 – Tindall	4 – Chatman, Suther, Tindall	Athletics–Recreation Center (5,003); Valparaiso, IN
February 8, 2001; 7:00 PM		Western Illinois	W 71–59	10–13 (6–5)	16 – Tindall	6 – Suther, Watson	6 – Tindall	Municipal Auditorium (1,746); Kansas City, MO
February 12, 2001*; 7:00 PM		Morris Brown	W 85–56	11–13	28 – Watson	7 – Golson, Palmer	6 – Suther	Municipal Auditorium (1,284); Kansas City, MO
February 15, 2001; 7:00 PM		Chicago State	W 71–59	12–13 (7–5)	19 – Watson	8 – Suther	4 – Tindall	Municipal Auditorium (1,564); Kansas City, MO
February 17, 2001; 7:00 PM		Youngstown State	L 69–75	12–14 (7–6)	23 – Tindall	5 – Suther	5 – Suther	Municipal Auditorium (6,743); Kansas City, MO
February 22, 2001; 7:30 PM		Oral Roberts	W 72–50	13–14 (8–6)	18 – Suther	8 – Suther	4 – Watson	Municipal Auditorium (1,593); Kansas City, MO
February 24, 2001; 6:00 PM		at Oakland	L 59–69	13–15 (8–7)	24 – Watson	7 – Jackson	3 – Suther	Athletics Center O'rena (2,055); Auburn Hills, MI
February 29, 2001; 7:00 PM		Indiana/Purdue–Indianapolis	W 59–52	14–15 (9–7)	13 – Watson	8 – Suther	3 – Tindall	Municipal Auditorium (1,143); Kansas City, MO
Conference Tournament
March 4, 2001*; 2:15 PM	(4)	vs. (5) Indiana/Purdue–Indianapolis [Quarterfinal]	L 52–54	14–16	13 – Golson	9 – Golson	2 – Tindall	Allen County; War Memorial Coliseum (2,194); Fort Wayne, IN
*Non-conference game. ^{#}Rankings from AP Poll. (#) Tournament seedings in parentheses. All times are in Central Standard Time (CST).
