= 2000–01 Southern Utah Thunderbirds men's basketball team =

American college basketball season

2000–01 Southern Utah Thunderbirds men's basketball

Mid-Continent tournament champions Mid-Continent Regular season co-champions

NCAA tournament
- Conference: Mid-Continent Conference
- Record: 25–6 (13–3 Mid-Con)
- Head coach: Bill Evans
- Home arena: America First Event Center

2000–01 Mid-Continent Conference men's basketball standings
	Conf.				Overall
Team	W		L	PCT	W		L	PCT
Valparaiso	13	–	3	.813	24	–	8	.750
Southern Utah †	13	–	3	.813	25	–	6	.806
Youngstown State	11	–	5	.688	19	–	11	.633
UMKC	9	–	7	.563	14	–	16	.467
Oakland	8	–	8	.500	12	–	16	.429
IUPUI	6	–	10	.375	11	–	18	.379
Oral Roberts	5	–	11	.313	10	–	19	.345
Western Illinois	5	–	11	.313	5	–	23	.179
Chicago State	2	–	14	.125	5	–	23	.179
† 2001 Mid-Con Tournament winner

The 2000–01 Southern Utah Thunderbirds men's basketball team represented Southern Utah University in the 2000–01 NCAA Division I men's basketball season. The Thunderbirds, led by 5th-year head coach Bill Evans, played their home games at the America First Event Center in Cedar City, Utah as members of the Mid-Continent Conference. They finished the season 25–6, 13–3 in Mid-Con play to finish in second place. They defeated Western Illinois, Oral Roberts, and Valparaiso to win the Mid-Con tournament and receive the conference's automatic bid to the NCAA tournament – the first, and only, appearance in program history. Playing as No. 14 seed in the East region, the Thunderbirds were beaten by No. 3 seed Boston College in the opening round.

== Roster ==
2000–01 Southern Utah Thunderbirds men's basketball team
Players	Coaches
Pos. / # / Name / Height / Weight / Year / Previous school / Hometown; F / / Fred House / 6 ft 5 in (1.96 m) / — / Sr	Head coach: Bill Evans; Assistant coach(es) Legend: (C) Team captain; (S) Suspended; (I) Ineligible; (W) Walk-on; Injured; Current redshirt; Roster

== Schedule and results ==
Date time, TV	Rank^{#}	Opponent^{#}	Result	Record	Site (attendance) city, state
Regular season
Nov 17, 2000*		at Arizona State	L 72–94	0–1	Wells Fargo Arena; Tempe, Arizona
Dec 22, 2000*		at Utah	W 77–70	8–3	Jon M. Huntsman Center; Salt Lake City, Utah
Big Sky tournament
Mar 4, 2001*		vs. Western Illinois; Quarterfinals	W 66–53	23–5	Allen County War Memorial Coliseum; Fort Wayne, Indiana
Mar 5, 2001*		vs. Oral Roberts; Semifinals	W 73–62	24–5	Allen County War Memorial Coliseum; Fort Wayne, Indiana
Mar 6, 2001*		vs. Valparaiso; Championship game	W 62–59	25–5	Allen County War Memorial Coliseum; Fort Wayne, Indiana
NCAA tournament
Mar 15, 2001*	(14 E)	vs. (3 E) No. 7 Boston College; First round	L 65–68	25–6	Nassau Coliseum; Uniondale, New York
*Non-conference game. ^{#}Rankings from AP Poll. (#) Tournament seedings in parentheses. E=East. All times are in Mountain.
