= Rawle Marshall =

Guyanese-American basketball player

- Marshall with the Indiana Pacers in 2006

Personal information
- Born: February 20, 1982 (age 44) Georgetown, Guyana
- Listed height: 6 ft 7 in (2.01 m)
- Listed weight: 190 lb (86 kg)

Career information
- High school: Mackenzie (Detroit, Michigan)
- College: Ball State (2000–2001); Oakland (2002–2005)
- NBA draft: 2005: undrafted
- Playing career: 2005–2017
- Position: Small forward
- Number: 1, 2

Career history
- 2005–2006: Dallas Mavericks
- 2005–2006: →Fort Worth Flyers
- 2006–2007: Indiana Pacers
- 2007–2008: Hemofarm
- 2008: Cibona Zagreb
- 2009: Lokomotiv Rostov
- 2009: Valencia
- 2009–2010: ASVEL Basket
- 2010–2011: PAOK
- 2011–2013: Astana
- 2013–2014: CSU Asesoft Ploiești
- 2014–2015: Koroivos Amaliadas
- 2015: Maratonistas de Coamo
- 2016: Champville SC
- 2016: Shahrdari Arak
- 2016: Huracanes del Atlántico
- 2016–2017: Shahrdari Gorgan

Career highlights
- 2× KBC champion (2012, 2013); 2× Kazakh Cup winner (2012, 2013); VTB United League Top Scorer (2012); All-Greek League Team (2011); Greek League Top Scorer (2011); French Leaders Cup winner (2010); MCC Defensive Player of the Year (2003); MCC Newcomer of the Year (2003); 2× First-team All-MCC (2003, 2005); MCC tournament MVP (2005)
- Stats at NBA.com
- Stats at Basketball Reference

Rawle Junior Kalomo Marshall (born February 20, 1982) is a Guyanese-American professional basketball player who last played for Shahrdari Gorgan of the Iranian Super League.

== Early life ==
Marshall is a 2000 graduate of Detroit's Mackenzie High School, where he was salutatorian of his senior class.

Marshall's favorite basketball player as a youth was Penny Hardaway.

== College career ==
Marshall spent his college freshman season at Ball State University, but then moved to Oakland University for his final three collegiate seasons. He was named Mid-Continent Conference's Newcomer of the Year and Defensive Player of the Year during his sophomore season in 2002–03. During his senior season in 2004–05, he helped Oakland win its first Mid-Continent Conference title. Marshall was named Most Valuable Player of the tournament. His stats during his three years with Oakland were 18.6 points per game, 6.3 rebounds per game, 2.2 steals per game and 1.1 blocks per game. He also became Oakland University's all-time leader in blocked shots in 90 games played.

== Professional career ==
=== NBA ===
Not selected during the 2005 NBA draft, Marshall has participated in several NBA Summer Leagues (Southern California Summer Pro League with the Memphis Grizzlies, Rocky Mountain Revue with the Dallas Mavericks). His performances (18.6 points per game, 3.0 rebounds per game and 1.4 assists per game in 27.4 minutes per game in the Rocky Mountain Revue) helped him to earn a one-year contract with the Dallas Mavericks on August 5, 2005.

Marshall did not find the court much early in his rookie season with the Mavericks. Instead, Marshall was sent to the NBA D-League team the Fort Worth Flyers, where he averaged 17.4 points per game. He then returned to the Dallas Mavericks, where he started multiple games due to injuries to Josh Howard, Adrian Griffin, and Devin Harris. While his minutes still were limited, he surpassed the expectations that surrounded an average undrafted rookie. However, he did not make the Mavericks' playoffs roster in 2006. On July 23, 2006, Marshall was traded to the Indiana Pacers, along with Darrell Armstrong and Josh Powell, for Anthony Johnson. He spent the 2006–07 season with the Pacers.

=== Europe and Asia ===
Marshall played with the Serbian club KK Hemofarm during the 2007–08 season. He also played with Hemofarm in that season's EuroCup (the 2nd tier European-wide competition) and the regional Adriatic League. He averaged 17.3 points per game in the EuroCup and 15.7 points per game in the Adriatic League. With his team Hemofarm he reached last 16 in EuroCup, where they lost to later finalist Akasvayu Girona. He was also finalist in Adriatic league and Basketball League of Serbia, where in both cases Hemofarm was defeated by KK Partizan.

He then moved to the Croatian League club KK Cibona for the 2008–09 season, a club also of the regional Adriatic League and also of the top European-wide competition the EuroLeague. He was honored as the EuroLeague Round 7 MVP during the 2008–09 season. He joined the LNB Pro A club ASVEL in 2009. In August 2010 he joined PAOK.

In July 2011, he signed with BC Astana in Kazakhstan. In October 2013, he signed with CSU Asesoft Ploiești.

On December 7, 2014, Marshall signed with Koroivos Amaliadas of Greece.

== NBA Career Statistics ==
=== Regular season ===
Year	Team	GP	GS	MPG	FG%	3P%	FT%	RPG	APG	SPG	BPG	PPG
2005–06	Dallas	23	9	10.5	.400	.333	.759	1.3	.4	.3	.3	3.1
2006–07	Indiana	40	2	9.0	.360	.222	.689	.7	.3	.3	.1	2.5
Career		63	11	9.6	.376	.238	.716	1.0	.4	.3	.2	2.7

== See also ==
- List of foreign basketball players in Serbia
