= Scott Sutton =

American basketball coach (born 1970)

Current position
- Title: Assistant coach
- Team: Oklahoma State
- Conference: Big 12

Biographical details
- Born: June 3, 1970 (age 56); Omaha, Nebraska, U.S.

Playing career
- 1992–1994: Oklahoma State

Coaching career (HC unless noted)
- 1995–1999: Oral Roberts (assistant)
- 1999–2017: Oral Roberts
- 2017–present: Oklahoma State (assistant)

Head coaching record
- Overall: 328–247 (.570)
- Tournaments: 0–3 (NCAA Division I); 0–2 (NIT); 1–1 (CBI); 2–2 (CIT)

Accomplishments and honors

Championships
- 3 MCC/Summit League tournament (2006–2008); 5 MCC/Summit League regular season (2005–2008, 2012)

Awards
- 3× MCC/Summit League Coach of the Year (2002, 2008, 2012)

Scott Andrew Sutton (born June 3, 1970) is an American college basketball coach, currently an assistant coach at Oklahoma State. He was formerly the head coach at Oral Roberts, and is the all-time wins leader in school history while leading ORU to three NCAA Tournament, two National Invitational Tournament and two CollegeInsider.com Tournament postseason appearances in 14 seasons. The Golden Eagles had won 20 or more games in seven of the past 10 seasons.

Scott is the youngest son of college basketball coach Eddie Sutton. One of Scott's brothers is Sean Sutton, the former head coach of Oklahoma State.

Sutton is the second ORU coach since Ken Trickey (Dick Acres in 1984 was the other) to reach the NCAA tournament and only the fifth since Trickey to take ORU to postseason play. The others were Jerry Hale (NIT – 1975, 1977), Ken Hayes (NIT – 1982), Acres, and Bill Self (NIT – 1997), who coached Kansas to the 2008 NCAA Men's Basketball National Championship.

== Head coaching record ==
Record table
Season	Team	Overall	Conference	Standing	Postseason
Oral Roberts Golden Eagles (Mid-Continent Conference / The Summit League) (1999–2012)
1999–00	Oral Roberts	13–17	8–8	6th	
2000–01	Oral Roberts	10–19	5–11	T–7th	
2001–02	Oral Roberts	17–14	10–4	T–2nd	
2002–03	Oral Roberts	18–10	9–5	4th	
2003–04	Oral Roberts	17–11	10–6	T–2nd	
2004–05	Oral Roberts	25–8	13–3	1st	NIT First Round
2005–06	Oral Roberts	21–12	13–3	T–1st	NCAA Division I First Round
2006–07	Oral Roberts	23–11	12–2	1st	NCAA Division I First Round
2007–08	Oral Roberts	24–9	16–2	1st	NCAA Division I First Round
2008–09	Oral Roberts	16–15	14–4	2nd	
2009–10	Oral Roberts	20–13	13–5	3rd	
2010–11	Oral Roberts	19–16	13–5	2nd	CIT First Round
2011–12	Oral Roberts	27–7	17–1	1st	NIT First Round
Oral Roberts Golden Eagles (Southland Conference) (2012–2014)
2012–13	Oral Roberts	20–15	13–5	3rd	CIT Quarterfinals
2013–14	Oral Roberts	17–16	10–8	5th	
Oral Roberts Golden Eagles (The Summit League) (2014–2017)
2014–15	Oral Roberts	19–15	10–6	3rd	CBI Second Round
2015–16	Oral Roberts	14–17	6–10	7th	
2016–17	Oral Roberts	8–22	4–12	9th	
Oral Roberts:		328–247 (.570)	196–100 (.662)		
Total:		328–247 (.570)			
National champion Postseason invitational champion Conference regular season champion Conference regular season and conference tournament champion Division regular season champion Division regular season and conference tournament champion Conference tournament champion

== Collegiate coaching history ==
=== Oral Roberts – assistant coach ===
Sutton's coaching career started when he was hired as an administrative assistant by former ORU head coach Bill Self prior to the 1995–96 season. Sutton served on Self's staff from 1995–1997 and Barry Hinson's staff from 1997–1999. In those four seasons, ORU posted a 75–39 (.658) record.

=== Oral Roberts – head coach ===
Scott was named the 11th head coach in ORU history on May 6, 1999. In 14 seasons at ORU, Sutton is 270–177 (.604). Since the start of the 2001–02 season, Sutton has guided the Golden Eagles to a 247–141 (.637) mark. During that same span, ORU has finished either first or second in the conference standings nine times. The Golden Eagles averaged 19.3 wins annually in Sutton's 14 seasons, but over the last nine years that figure grew to 21.7 victories per season. Sutton guided ORU to seven 20-win seasons, five Summit League regular-season titles, three tournament championships, three NCAA Tournament appearances, two NIT trips and two visits to the CIT. During Sutton's tenure, ORU has defeated Arkansas, Georgetown, Kansas, Missouri, Nebraska, New Mexico, Oklahoma State, Saint Louis, Seton Hall, South Florida, Southern Cal, Stanford, Texas Tech, Utah, Wichita State and Xavier.

In 14 seasons at the reins, Sutton produced two All-Americans (Caleb Green and Dominique Morrison), an NBA player (Larry Owens), five Freshman All-Americans, 27 all-conference selections, four conference players of the year, four conference newcomers of the year, three conference sixth man of the year picks, and two conference defensive players of the year.

Sutton said he was comfortable and happy at ORU. He told the Tulsa World in May 2012 that "it would take something very special. I'd never say never. However, I'm not out there chasing jobs. I'm not chasing the money."

On April 10, 2017, Oral Roberts dismissed Sutton after finishing the season 9-22 and last in their conference, which was the worst record in the 18 years he coached at ORU.

=== Oklahoma State – assistant coach ===
On October 22, 2017, Sutton returned to Oklahoma State as an assistant coach, replacing Lamont Evans, who was suspended and eventually fired due to the latter's involvement in the NCAA men's basketball corruption scandal.

== Honors and awards ==
Sutton became the all-time wins leader at ORU with an 81–73 win over North Dakota State on February 5, 2011. The win gave Sutton 215 wins as the head coach of the Golden Eagles. ORU's previous leader was Ken Trickey, with 214 wins over 11 seasons (1969–74, 1987–93).

Sutton has been crowned conference coach of the year three times in his career: 2002, 2008 and 2012.

In 2007, Sutton was one of four finalists for the Clair Bee Coach of the Year Award, presented annually by Chip Hilton Sports and the Naismith Memorial Basketball Hall of Fame. Sutton was a finalist along with Tony Bennett of Washington State, Bo Ryan of Wisconsin, and John Thompson III of Georgetown. Bennett was the eventual recipient of the award.

Sutton was tabbed by the National Association of Basketball Coaches as the District 12 Co-Coach of the Year in 2005.

== Personal life ==
Sutton was born June 3, 1970, in Omaha, Nebraska. He later attended Henry Clay High School in Lexington, Kentucky. Growing up as the youngest son of a legendary coach, Sutton had the opportunity to play for his father at Oklahoma State from 1992–94, helping the Cowboys reach the NCAA Tournament both seasons.

Sutton and his wife, Kim, are the parents of three daughters.
