= 2003–04 Valparaiso Crusaders men's basketball team =

American college basketball season

2003–04 Valparaiso Crusaders men's basketball

Mid-Con Regular season champions Mid-Con tournament champions

NCAA tournament, First Round
- Conference: Mid-Continent Conference
- Record: 18–13 (11–5 Mid-Con)
- Head coach: Homer Drew (16th season)
- Home arena: Athletics–Recreation Center

2003–04 Mid-Continent Conference men's basketball standings
	Conf.				Overall
Team	W		L	PCT	W		L	PCT
Valparaiso †	11	–	5	.688	18	–	13	.581
IUPUI	10	–	6	.625	21	–	11	.656
Centenary	10	–	6	.625	16	–	12	.571
Oral Roberts	10	–	6	.625	17	–	11	.607
UMKC	9	–	7	.563	15	–	14	.517
Chicago State	9	–	7	.563	12	–	20	.375
Southern Utah	6	–	10	.375	10	–	18	.357
Oakland	6	–	10	.375	13	–	17	.433
Western Illinois	1	–	15	.063	3	–	25	.107
† 2004 Mid-Con Tournament winner Rankings from AP Poll

The 2003–04 Valparaiso Crusaders men's basketball team represented Valparaiso University during the 2003–04 NCAA Division I men's basketball season. The Crusaders, led by 16th-year head coach Homer Drew, played their home games at the Athletics–Recreation Center as members of the Mid-Continent Conference. Valpo finished atop the Mid-Con regular season standings, and went on to win the Mid-Con tournament to receive an automatic bid to the NCAA tournament. As No. 15 seed in the Midwest region, the Crusaders lost to No. 2 seed Gonzaga, 76–49, to finish with a record of 18–13 (11–5 Mid-Con).

This season marked the final trip to the NCAA tournament for Coach Drew, and capped a run of seven NCAA tournament appearances in an eight-year stretch.

== Roster ==
2003–04 Valparaiso Crusaders men's basketball team
Players	Coaches
Pos. / # / Name / Height / Weight / Year / Hometown; F / 42 / Dan Oppland / 6 ft 8 in (2.03 m) / 225 lb (102 kg) / So / St. Louis, Missouri	Head coach: Homer Drew (William Jewell); Assistant coach(es) Legend: (C) Team captain; (S) Suspended; (I) Ineligible; (W) Walk-on; Injured; Current redshirt; Roster

== Schedule and results ==
Date time, TV	Rank^{#}	Opponent^{#}	Result	Record	Site (attendance) city, state
Non-conference Regular season
Nov 21, 2003*		vs. Arkansas-Monticello; Pepsi Blue & Gold Classic	W 72–53	1–0	Bradley Center (15,659); Milwaukee, Wisconsin
Nov 22, 2003*		at No. 23 Marquette; Pepsi Blue & Gold Classic	L 70–75	1–1	Bradley Center (16,581); Milwaukee, Wisconsin
Nov 25, 2003*		South Florida	L 62–64	1–2	Athletics-Recreation Center (3,101); Valparaiso, Indiana
Dec 2, 2003*		No. 19 Cincinnati	L 49–68	1–3	Athletics-Recreation Center (5,126); Valparaiso, Indiana
Dec 8, 2003*		Indiana State	W 59–53	2–3	Athletics-Recreation Center (3,000); Valparaiso, Indiana
Dec 10, 2003*		Milwaukee	L 82–86	2–4	Athletics-Recreation Center (2,897); Valparaiso, Indiana
Dec 12, 2003*		Loyola (IL)	L 69–76	2–5	Athletics-Recreation Center (4,019); Valparaiso, Indiana
Mid-Continent Regular season
Mid-Con tournament
Mar 7, 2004*		vs. Oakland; Quarterfinals	W 73–64	16–12	Kemper Arena (2,622); Kansas City, Missouri
Mar 8, 2004*		vs. Missouri–Kansas City; Semifinals	W 90–78	17–12	Kemper Arena (3,812); Kansas City, Missouri
Mar 9, 2004*		vs. IUPUI; Championship game	W 75–70	18–12	Kemper Arena (2,744); Kansas City, Missouri
NCAA tournament
Mar 18, 2004*	(15 MW)	vs. (2 MW) No. 3 Gonzaga; First round	L 49–76	18–13	KeyArena (15,827); Seattle, Washington
*Non-conference game. ^{#}Rankings from AP poll. (#) Tournament seedings in parentheses. MW=Midwest. All times are in Central Time.
