= Tom Hankins =

American basketball player and coach

Personal information
- Born: January 22, 1966 (age 60) Dallas, Texas, U.S.

Career information
- High school: Thomas Edison (Tulsa, Oklahoma)
- College: Northeastern Oklahoma A&M (1984–1986); Northeastern State (1987–1989)
- Coaching career: 1991–present

Career history

Coaching
- 1991–1992: Northwest Missouri State (assistant)
- 1992–1997: East Central HS (assistant)
- 1997–2012: Oral Roberts (assistant)
- 2012–2015: Southern Illinois (associate HC)
- 2015–2019: Central Oklahoma
- 2019–2021: Indiana Pacers (assistant player development)
- 2020–2026: Fort Wayne/Indiana Mad Ants / Noblesville Boom

Career highlights
- NBA G League Next Up Game coach (2024)

Tom Hankins (born January 22, 1966) is an American basketball who most recently was the head coach for the Noblesville Boom of the NBA G League.

== Early life and college career ==
Hankins attended Thomas Edison High School in Tulsa, Oklahoma, graduating in 1984. He was a high school teammate of future NBA executive Kevin Pritchard. Hankins played college basketball at Northeastern Oklahoma A&M College and Northeastern State University. He worked as a graduate assistant at Northeastern Oklahoma A&M under coach Larry Gipson.

== Coaching career ==
=== Northwest Missouri State ===
Hankins served as assistant coach for Northwest Missouri State in the 1991–1992 season.

=== East Central High School ===
In 1992 Hankins joined East Central High School in Tulsa, Oklahoma to serve as an assistant coach. He coached there until 1997.

=== Oral Roberts University ===
In 1997 Hankins joined Oral Roberts University as an assistant coach. He served as assistant until 2012, working with head coaches Barry Hinson and Scott Sutton. He helped the team to five Summit League titles and three NCAA tournament appearances. Notable players coached include Larry Owens and Dominique Morrison.

=== Southern Illinois University ===
In 2012 Hankins was hired as an assistant head coach for Southern Illinois University, reuniting with Barry Hinson. He served as an assistant until 2015.

=== University of Central Oklahoma ===
In 2015 Hankins was hired by University of Central Oklahoma to serve as head coach. In 2019 Hankins resigned as head coach.

=== Indiana Pacers ===
In 2019 Hankins was hired by the Indiana Pacers to serve as the assistant player development coach. He was with the Pacers for the 2019–2020 season, focusing on players such as Naz Mitrou-Long and Brian Bowen.

=== Noblesville Boom ===
In January 2021, Hankins was hired as the head coach of the Fort Wayne Mad Ants (now called the Noblesville Boom).

== Head coaching record ==
=== College ===
Record table
Season	Team	Overall	Conference	Standing	Postseason
Central Oklahoma Bronchos (Mid-America Intercollegiate Athletics Association) (2015–2019)
2015–16	Central Oklahoma	16–14	11–11	T–5th	
2016–17	Central Oklahoma	17–12	11–8	T–4th	
2017–18	Central Oklahoma	20–10	12–7	4th	
2018–19	Central Oklahoma	11–17	4–15	14th	
Central Oklahoma:		64–53 (.547)	38–41 (.481)		
Total:		64–53 (.547)			
National champion Postseason invitational champion Conference regular season champion Conference regular season and conference tournament champion Division regular season champion Division regular season and conference tournament champion Conference tournament champion

=== G League ===
Team	Year	G	W	L	W–L%	Finish	PG	PW	PL	PW–L%	Result
Fort Wayne	2020–21	15	6	9	.400	13th in G League	—	—	—	—	Missed playoffs
Fort Wayne	2021–22	34	17	17	.500	9th in Eastern	—	—	—	—	Missed playoffs
Fort Wayne	2022–23	32	18	14	.563	6th in Eastern	1	0	1	.000	Lost in Quarterfinal
Indiana	2023–24	34	21	13	.618	3rd in Eastern	1	0	1	.000	Lost in Quarterfinal
Indiana	2024–25	34	20	14	.588	4th in Eastern	2	1	1	.500	Lost Semifinal
Noblesville	2025–26	36	16	20	.444	10th in Eastern	—	—	—	—	Missed playoffs
Career		185	98	87	.530		4	1	3	.250	
