= The Shot (Valparaiso–Ole Miss) =

1998 American college basketball play

1998 NCAA tournament Midwest Regional First Round
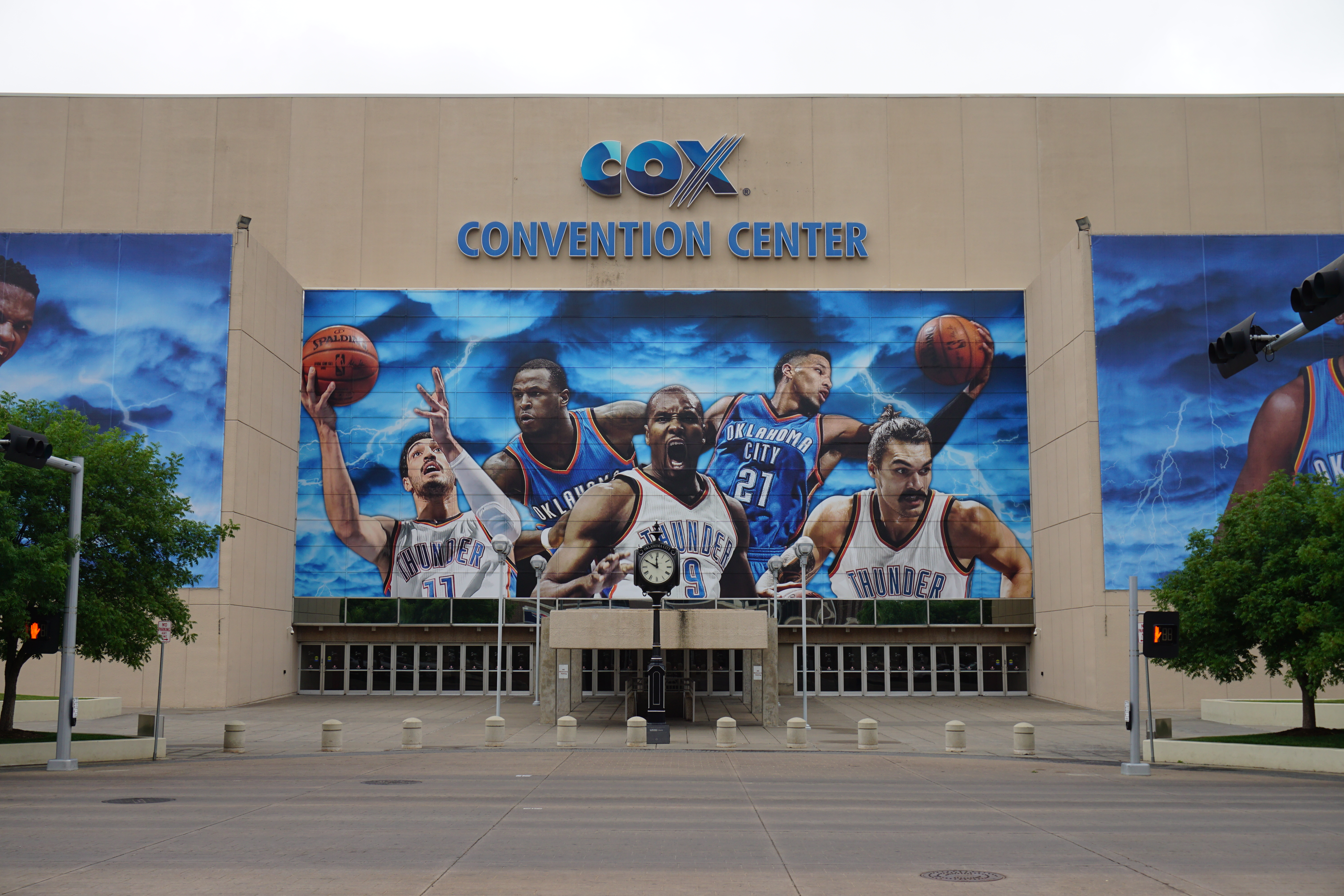
- The Cox Convention Center (formerly The Myriad) in 2016
Valparaiso Crusaders	Ole Miss Rebels
(21–9)	(22–6)
70	69
Head coach: Homer Drew	Head coach: Rob Evans
- AP: NR
- Coaches: NR
- AP: 13
- Coaches: 14
	1st half	2nd half	Total
Valparaiso Crusaders	34	36	70
Ole Miss Rebels	38	31	69
- Date: March 13, 1998
- Venue: The Myriad (now Prairie Surf Studios), Oklahoma City, Oklahoma

United States TV coverage
- Network: CBS
- Announcers: Ted Robinson, Rolando Blackman, Beth Mowins

"The Shot" refers to a play by the Valparaiso Crusaders (now Beacons) that occurred in the Midwest Regional first round of the 1998 NCAA Tournament. The play came in Valpo's game against the Ole Miss Rebels at The Myriad in Oklahoma City on March 13, 1998, in which Bryce Drew hit a three-point shot to give the #13 seed Crusaders a 70–69 victory over the #4 seed Rebels. "The Shot" became one of the notable highlights in March Madness history; it was named the fifth most memorable moment in CBS's coverage of the NCAA tournament by sports analyst Gary Parrish in 2007.

== Buildup ==
Although Ole Miss was a much higher seed than Valparaiso and was expected to win easily and advance to the second round, the Crusaders played tough throughout and were down 69–67 with less than ten seconds left. Bryce Drew, Valpo's star guard and son of coach Homer Drew, missed a three-pointer with approximately five seconds left, and after Mississippi grabbed the rebound Valparaiso fouled Ole Miss' Ansu Sesay to stop the clock and send the 72.5% free-throw shooter to the line.

Although Sesay had made three of his last five attempts at the charity stripe, he missed the first of two. Coach Drew then called his last time out before Sesay could take his second free throw, in order to draw up a play for the Crusaders' last possession. When play resumed Sesay missed his second free throw, and following a battle for the loose ball Valparaiso was awarded possession after Ole Miss guard Keith Carter knocked the ball out of bounds. This left Valpo with 2.5 seconds to get off a shot, and forced inbounder Jaime Sykes to put the ball in play from the far end of the court.

== The play ==
The Crusaders' play for this situation was known as "Pacer". Sykes threw the inbounds pass over the midcourt line, where Bill Jenkins outjumped a Rebel defender for the ball and immediately tapped it over to a running Drew, who shot a 23-foot 3-point shot. Drew's defender had been left flat-footed as he considered defending Sykes, leaving Drew open as he began streaking. The ball went in as time expired, giving Valpo a 70–69 win and eliminating Ole Miss from the tournament.

== The calls ==
The inbounder will be Jamie Sykes, Carter pressuring... It's to Jenkins, to Drew for the win! GOOD!!! HE DID IT!! BRYCE DREW DID IT!! VALPO HAS WON THE GAME, A MIRACLE!! (after a short pause) An absolute miracle! Bryce Drew has won it for Valparaiso!

— Ted Robinson on CBS's TV broadcast

They gotta go the length of the court, with 2.5 left...Sykes long pass...Bill Jenkins...Drew's three for the win....GOOD!!! GOOD!!! VALPO WINS! VALPO WINS! VALPO WINS! BRYCE DREW! HITS A THREE! AND THE CRUSADERS HAVE MOVED INTO THE SECOND ROUND! BRYCE DREW HIT A THREE-POINTER TO WIN THIS GAME, 70–69! THE KID...PERFORMS ANOTHER MIRACLE!

— Todd Ickow on the Valparaiso radio broadcast

External videos
- Full game broadcast by CBS on YouTube

== Box score ==
CBS

March 13, 1998

Box score

#13 Valparaiso Crusaders 70, #4 Ole Miss Rebels 69
Scoring by half: 34–38, 36–31
Pts: Bryce Drew – 22; Rebs: Bill Jenkins – 11; Asts: Bryce Drew – 7	Pts: Keith Carter – 29; Rebs: Keith Carter – 11; Asts: Tied – 3

The Myriad – Oklahoma City, Oklahoma

== Aftermath ==
With the win against Ole Miss, Valparaiso started to make a Cinderella run in the tournament. The Crusaders later defeated #12-seeded Florida State in the second round, 83–77 in overtime. Their run came to an end in the Sweet Sixteen when the Crusaders lost to #8 seed Rhode Island, 68–74.

In 2003, ESPN Classic ranked Valparaiso's 1998 run as #3 on its "Classic Cinderellas" list, with "The Shot" as a large part of the reason why it ranked as high as it did.

== Parody ==
"The Shot" was parodied during the 2013 NCAA Tournament with an Axe Apollo Body Spray commercial by placing a fictitious Astronaut on the Valparaiso sideline that garnered more attention than Drew's shot.
