= 2001 Mid-Continent Conference men's basketball tournament =

- Classification: Division I
- Season: 2000–01
- Teams: 8
- Site: Allen County War Memorial Coliseum; Fort Wayne, Indiana
- Champions: Southern Utah (1st title)
- Winning coach: Bill Evans (1st title)
- MVP: Fred House (Southern Utah)
- Mid-Continent Conference men's basketball tournaments

2000–01 Mid-Continent Conference men's basketball standings
	Conf.				Overall
Team	W		L	PCT	W		L	PCT
Valparaiso	13	–	3	.813	24	–	8	.750
Southern Utah †	13	–	3	.813	25	–	6	.806
Youngstown State	11	–	5	.688	19	–	11	.633
UMKC	9	–	7	.563	14	–	16	.467
Oakland	8	–	8	.500	12	–	16	.429
IUPUI	6	–	10	.375	11	–	18	.379
Oral Roberts	5	–	11	.313	10	–	19	.345
Western Illinois	5	–	11	.313	5	–	23	.179
Chicago State	2	–	14	.125	5	–	23	.179
† 2001 Mid-Con Tournament winner

The 2001 Mid-Continent Conference men's basketball tournament was held March 4–6, 2001, at the Allen County War Memorial Coliseum in Fort Wayne, Indiana. This was the 18th edition of the tournament for the Association of Mid-Continent Universities/Mid-Continent Conference, now known as the Summit League.

Southern Utah defeated six-time defending champ Valparaiso 62–59 to earn an automatic berth into the 2001 NCAA tournament.

== Bracket ==
Quarterfinals; March 4
1	Valparaiso	84
8	Chicago State	72
4	UMKC	52
5	IUPUI	54
2	Southern Utah	66
7	Western Illinois	53
3	Youngstown State	70
6	Oral Roberts	73

Semifinals; March 5
1	Valparaiso	65
5	IUPUI	54
2	Southern Utah	73
6	Oral Roberts	62

Final; March 6
1	Valparaiso	59
2	Southern Utah	62
