= Gold Dome (Centenary) =

Multi-purpose arena of Centenary College of Louisiana

Coordinates: 32.480921°N 93.729818°W

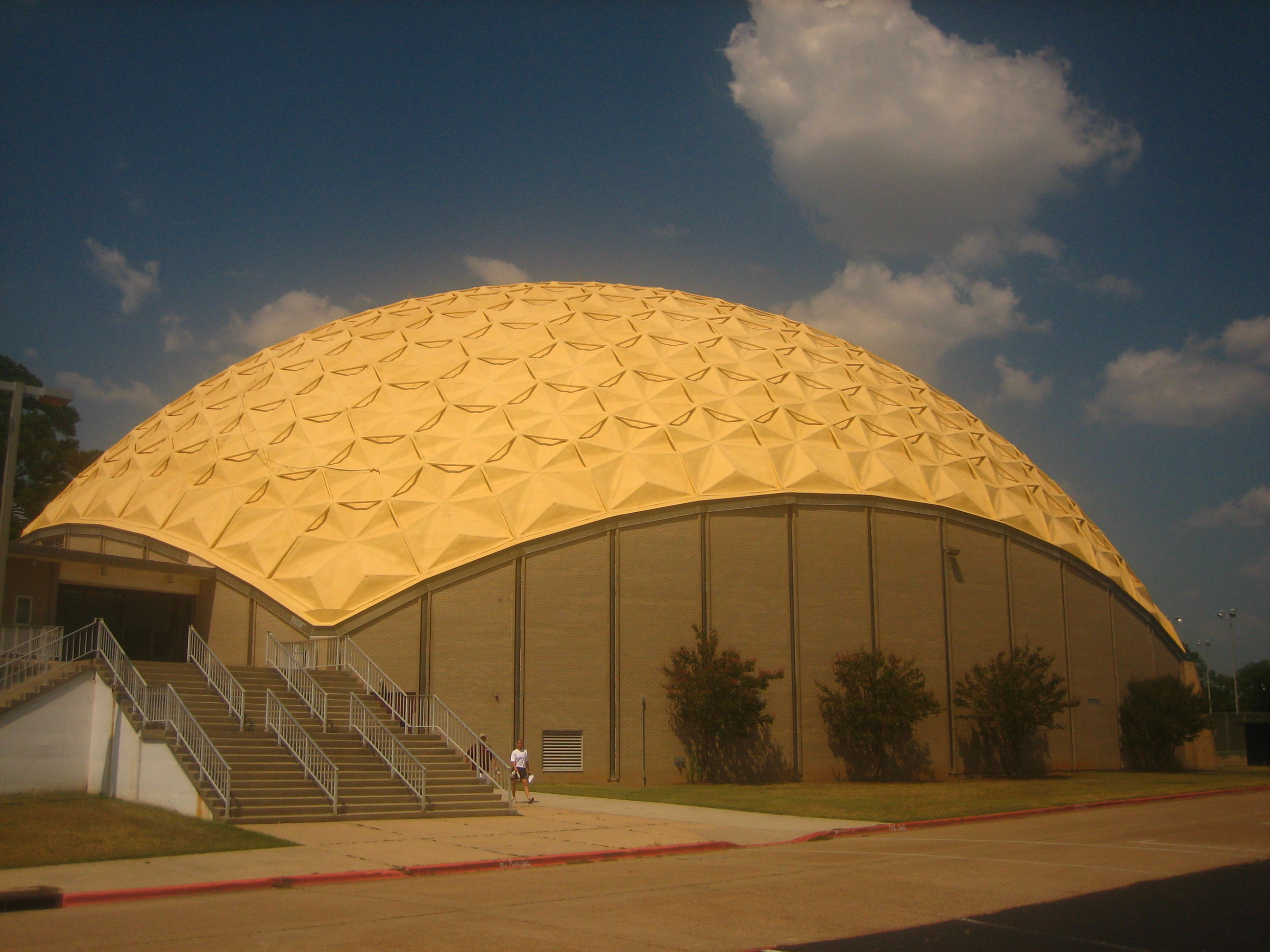
- Interactive map of Gold Dome
- Address: 2911 Centenary Blvd; Shreveport, Louisiana; United States
- Owner: Centenary College of Louisiana
- Operator: Centenary College of Louisiana
- Capacity: 3,000
- Type: Arena
- Current use: Basketball; Volleyball

Construction
- Opened: 1970; 56 years ago
- Renovated: 2011

Tenants
- Centenary Gentlemen and Ladies; Shreveport Mavericks (TBL) (2021–present)

Website
- gocentenary.com/gold_dome

The Gold Dome is a 3,000-seat multi-purpose arena on the campus of Centenary College of Louisiana in Shreveport, Louisiana. It was built in 1970. It is home to the Centenary Gentlemen basketball team, Centenary Ladies basketball team, volleyball team and gymnastics team.

== Construction ==
The Gold Dome is a rare project built entirely by private funds (minus construction financing, for a US$19 million construction cost).

Its only significant structural element is the raised dome section which must be closed off before the entire structure can be lowered into place.

Gold Dome was built at the insistence of the Louisiana Forum Foundation, which granted it a tax-exempt charter in 1967.
