= Union Multipurpose Activity Center =

Multipurpose arena in Tulsa, Oklahoma

Coordinates: 36.064005°N 95.869403°W

The Union Multipurpose Activity Center (also known as the UMAC or John Q. Hammons Arena) is a 5,662-seat multipurpose arena located in Tulsa, Oklahoma. Built in 2003 at a cost of $22 million, it is the home of the Union High School Redhawks basketball team. It hosted The Summit League's men's basketball tournament from 2005 to 2008.

The arena contains 2,934 permanent seats and can host concerts, trade shows (27,480 square feet (2,553 m^{2}) of space at the arena floor), conventions, and other events. There are 6 concession stands and 14 restrooms divided equally between the men and women. The center scoreboard at the UMAC features a 6' x 8' video screen.
