= North Dakota Fighting Hawks men's basketball statistical leaders =

The North Dakota Fighting Hawks men's basketball statistical leaders are individual statistical leaders of the North Dakota Fighting Hawks men's basketball program in various categories, including points, assists, blocks, rebounds, and steals. Within those areas, the lists identify single-game, single-season, and career leaders. The Fighting Hawks represent the University of North Dakota in the NCAA's Summit League.

North Dakota began competing in intercollegiate basketball in 1904. However, the school's record book does not generally list records from before the 1950s, as records from before this period are often incomplete and inconsistent. Since scoring was much lower in this era, and teams played much fewer games during a typical season, it is likely that few or no players from this era would appear on these lists anyway.

The NCAA did not officially record assists as a stat until the 1983–84 season, and blocks and steals until the 1985–86 season, but North Dakota's record books includes players in these stats before these seasons. These lists are updated through the end of the 2024–25 season.

== Scoring ==
Career
| Rk | Player | Points | Seasons |
|---|---|---|---|
| 1 | Scott Guldseth | 2190 | 1989–90 1990–91 1991–92 1992–93 |
| 2 | Dave Vonesh | 2053 | 1986–87 1987–88 1989–90 1990–91 |
| 3 | Troy Huff | 2005 | 2010–11 2011–12 2012–13 2013–14 |
| 4 | Travis Tuttle | 1935 | 1992–93 1994–95 1995–96 1996–97 |
| 5 | Chris Gardner | 1829 | 1989–90 1990–91 1991–92 1992–93 1993–94 |
| 6 | Quinton Hooker | 1787 | 2013–14 2014–15 2015–16 2016–17 |
| 7 | Phil Jackson | 1708 | 1964–65 1965–66 1966–67 |
| 8 | Todd Johnson | 1672 | 1990–91 1991–92 1993–94 1994–95 |
| 9 | Jon Haaven | 1634 | 1951–52 1952–53 1953–54 1956–57 |
| 10 | Chad Mustard | 1568 | 1996–97 1997–98 1998–99 1999–00 |

Season
| Rk | Player | Points | Season |
|---|---|---|---|
| 1 | Dave Vonesh | 788 | 1989–90 |

Single game
| Rk | Player | Points | Season | Opponent |
|---|---|---|---|---|
| 1 | Henry (Doc) O'Keefe | 56 | 1907–08 | Mayville State |
| 2 | Phil Jackson | 52 | 1966–67 | Parsons |
| 3 | Treysen Eaglestaff | 51 | 2024–25 | South Dakota State |
| 4 | Phil Jackson | 50 | 1966–67 | UNI |
| 5 | Al Jenkins | 49 | 1968–69 | Morningside |
| 6 | Henry (Doc) O'Keefe | 46 | 1906–07 | Fargo College |
| 7 | Phil Jackson | 44 | 1965–66 | Valparaiso |
| | Travis Tuttle | 44 | 1995–96 | Morningside |
| 9 | Arthur Netcher | 41 | 1908–09 | Fosston H.S. |
| | Phil Jackson | 41 | 1966–67 | South Dakota State |
| | Jerome Beasley | 41 | 2001–02 | North Dakota State |
| | Jerome Beasley | 41 | 2002–03 | Augustana |
| | Geno Crandall | 41 | 2017–18 | Troy |
| | Greyson Uelmen | 41 | 2025–26 | Denver |

== Rebounds ==
Career
| Rk | Player | Rebounds | Seasons |
|---|---|---|---|
| 1 | Dave Vonesh | 1207 | 1986–87 1987–88 1989–90 1990–91 |
| 2 | Don Augustin | 1142 | 1952–53 1953–54 1954–55 1955–56 |
| 3 | Phil Jackson | 1109 | 1964–65 1965–66 1966–67 |
| 4 | Todd Johnson | 904 | 1990–91 1991–92 1993–94 1994–95 |
| 5 | Chris Gardner | 797 | 1989–90 1990–91 1991–92 1992–93 1993–94 |
| 6 | Chuck Dodge | 788 | 1969–70 1970–71 1971–72 |
| 7 | Troy Huff | 750 | 2010–11 2011–12 2012–13 2013–14 |
| 8 | Chad Mustard | 741 | 1996–97 1997–98 1998–99 1999–00 |
| 9 | Dan Clausen | 736 | 1980–81 1981–82 |
| 10 | Chris Fahrbach | 733 | 1975–76 1976–77 1977–78 1978–79 |

Season
| Rk | Player | Rebounds | Season |
|---|---|---|---|
| 1 | Dave Vonesh | 410 | 1989–90 |
| 2 | Dan Clausen | 376 | 1980–81 |
| 3 | Phil Jackson | 374 | 1965–66 |
| | Phil Jackson | 374 | 1966–67 |
| 5 | Dave Vonesh | 372 | 1990–91 |
| 6 | Phil Jackson | 361 | 1964–65 |
| 7 | Dan Clausen | 360 | 1981–82 |
| 8 | Dave Vonesh | 347 | 1987–88 |
| 9 | Don Augustin | 335 | 1954–55 |
| 10 | Steve Brekke | 334 | 1981–82 |

Single game
| Rk | Player | Rebounds | Season | Opponent |
|---|---|---|---|---|
| 1 | Don Augustin | 32 | 1954–55 | Morningside |

== Assists ==
Career
| Rk | Player | Assists | Seasons |
|---|---|---|---|
| 1 | Burke Barlow | 595 | 1992–93 1993–94 1994–95 1995–96 |
| 2 | Jamal Webb | 485 | 2010–11 2011–12 2012–13 2013–14 |
| 3 | Ben Jacobson | 420 | 1989–90 1990–91 1991–92 1992–93 |
| 4 | Quinton Hooker | 417 | 2013–14 2014–15 2015–16 2016–17 |
| 5 | Rico Burkett | 401 | 1989–90 1990–91 |
| 6 | Rick Bouchard | 392 | 1976–77 1977–78 1978–79 |
| 7 | Geno Crandall | 379 | 2015–16 2016–17 2017–18 |
| 8 | Aaron Anderson | 360 | 2010–11 2011–12 2012–13 2013–14 |
| 9 | Marlon Stewart | 335 | 2017–18 2018–19 2019–20 |
| 10 | Doug Moe | 330 | 1977–78 1978–79 1979–80 1980–81 |

Season
| Rk | Player | Assists | Season |
|---|---|---|---|
| 1 | Rico Burkett | 232 | 1989–90 |
| 2 | Burke Barlow | 205 | 1993–94 |
| 3 | Ben Jacobson | 203 | 1992–93 |
| 4 | Ray Jones | 179 | 1973–74 |
| 5 | Rico Burkett | 169 | 1990–91 |
| 6 | Marlon Stewart | 168 | 2019–20 |
| 7 | Hunter Berg | 167 | 1997–98 |
| 8 | Burke Barlow | 157 | 1994–95 |
| 9 | Burke Barlow | 155 | 1995–96 |
| 10 | Mario Porter | 154 | 2001–02 |

Single game
| Rk | Player | Assists | Season | Opponent |
|---|---|---|---|---|
| 1 | Doug Moe | 14 | 1979–80 | North Dakota State |

== Steals ==
Career
| Rk | Player | Steals | Seasons |
|---|---|---|---|
| 1 | Jamal Webb | 240 | 2010–11 2011–12 2012–13 2013–14 |
| 2 | Troy Huff | 228 | 2010–11 2011–12 2012–13 2013–14 |
| 3 | Quinton Hooker | 195 | 2013–14 2014–15 2015–16 2016–17 |
| 4 | Geno Crandall | 190 | 2015–16 2016–17 2017–18 |
| 5 | Scott Guldseth | 178 | 1989–90 1990–91 1991–92 1992–93 |
| 6 | Eli King | 163 | 2023–24 2024–25 2025–26 |
| 7 | Aaron Anderson | 141 | 2010–11 2011–12 2012–13 2013–14 |
| 8 | Rico Burkett | 127 | 1989–90 1990–91 |
| 9 | Chris Gardner | 124 | 1989–90 1990–91 1991–92 1992–93 1993–94 |
| 10 | Dave Vonesh | 122 | 1986–87 1987–88 1989–90 1990–91 |

Season
| Rk | Player | Steals | Season |
|---|---|---|---|
| 1 | Troy Huff | 79 | 2013–14 |
| 2 | Rico Burkett | 75 | 1989–90 |
| 3 | Jamal Webb | 74 | 2012–13 |
| 4 | Eli King | 72 | 2025–26 |
| 5 | Dave Vonesh | 70 | 1989–90 |
| 6 | Geno Crandall | 67 | 2017–18 |
| 7 | Steve Brekke | 66 | 1982–83 |
| 8 | Geno Crandall | 64 | 2016–17 |
| 9 | Aaron Harris | 60 | 1981–82 |
| | Quinton Hooker | 60 | 2015–16 |

Single game
| Rk | Player | Steals | Season | Opponent |
|---|---|---|---|---|
| 1 | Dave Vonesh | 9 | 1989–90 | Augustana |

== Blocks ==
Career
| Rk | Player | Blocks | Seasons |
|---|---|---|---|
| 1 | Chris Gardner | 313 | 1989–90 1990–91 1991–92 1992–93 1993–94 |
| 2 | Patrick Mitchell | 157 | 2008–09 2009–10 2010–11 2011–12 |
| 3 | Dan Clausen | 133 | 1980–81 1981–82 |
| | Kyle Behrens | 133 | 1997–98 1998–99 1999–2000 2000–01 |
| 5 | Dave Vonesh | 118 | 1986–87 1987–88 1989–90 1990–91 |
| 6 | Scott Guldseth | 106 | 1989–90 1990–91 1991–92 1992–93 |
| 7 | Todd Rypkema | 102 | 2001–02 2002–03 2003–04 2004–05 |
| 8 | Filip Rebraca | 76 | 2018–19 2019–20 2020–21 |
| 9 | Steve Staver | 73 | 1985–86 1986–87 |
| 10 | Mark Basco | 72 | 1982–83 1983–84 1984–85 1985–86 |

Season
| Rk | Player | Blocks | Season |
|---|---|---|---|
| 1 | Chris Gardner | 93 | 1991–92 |
| 2 | Dan Clausen | 78 | 1981–82 |
| 3 | Chris Gardner | 77 | 1992–93 |
| 4 | Chris Gardner | 76 | 1990–91 |
| 5 | Chris Gardner | 61 | 1993–94 |
| 6 | Patrick Mitchell | 56 | 2010–11 |
| 7 | Dan Clausen | 55 | 1980–81 |
| 8 | Dave Vonesh | 49 | 1987–88 |
| 9 | Steve Staver | 47 | 1986–87 |
| | Mitch Wilmer | 47 | 2012–13 |

Single game
| Rk | Player | Blocks | Season | Opponent |
|---|---|---|---|---|
| 1 | Dan Clausen | 10 | 1981–82 | Augustana |
