= Great West Conference men's basketball tournament =

Great West Conference men's basketball tournament (defunct)
- Conference basketball championship
- Sport: Basketball
- Conference: Great West Conference
- Number of teams: 7
- Format: Single-elimination tournament
- Played: 2010–2013
- Last contest: 2013
- Most championships: North Dakota (2)

The Great West Conference men's basketball tournament was the conference championship tournament in basketball for the Great West Conference. The tournament was held every year between 2010 and 2013. It was a single-elimination tournament and seeding was based on regular season records. The winner, declared conference champion, received the conference's automatic bid to the CollegeInsider.com Postseason Tournament.

== History ==
Year	Champion	Score	Runner-up	Location
2010	South Dakota	91–86	Houston Baptist	McKay Events Center • Orem, UT
2011	North Dakota	77–76 ^{(2OT)}	South Dakota	UCCU Center • Orem, UT
2012	North Dakota	75–60	NJIT	Emil and Patricia Jones Convocation Center • Chicago, IL
2013	Chicago State	75–60	Houston Baptist	Emil and Patricia Jones Convocation Center • Chicago, IL

== Winners by school ==
Member	Winners	Winning years
North Dakota	2	2011, 2012
Chicago State	1	2013
South Dakota	1	2010
Houston Baptist	0	—
NJIT	0	—
Texas–Pan American	0	—
Utah Valley	0	—
