= 2010–11 North Dakota Fighting Sioux men's basketball team =

American college basketball season

2010–11 North Dakota Fighting Sioux men's basketball

Great West Tournament Champions

CIT, First Round
- Conference: Great West Conference
- Record: 19–15 (8–4 Great West)
- Head coach: Brian Jones (5th season)
- Associate head coach: Ryan Moody (5th season)
- Assistant coaches: Bryan Martin (3rd season); Nate Philippe (1st season)
- Home arena: Betty Engelstad Sioux Center

2010–11 Great West Conference men's basketball standings
	Conf.				Overall
Team	W		L	PCT	W		L	PCT
Utah Valley	11	–	1	.917	19	–	11	.633
NJIT	9	–	3	.750	15	–	15	.500
North Dakota †	8	–	4	.667	19	–	15	.559
South Dakota	7	–	5	.583	18	–	15	.545
Chicago State	3	–	9	.250	6	–	26	.188
Texas–Pan American	2	–	10	.167	6	–	25	.194
Houston Baptist	2	–	10	.167	5	–	26	.161
† 2011 Great West tournament winner As of March 16, 2011; Rankings from AP Poll

The 2010–11 North Dakota Fighting Sioux men's basketball team represented the University of North Dakota in the 2010–11 NCAA Division I men's basketball season. The Fighting Sioux, led by head coach Brian Jones, played their home games at the Betty Engelstad Sioux Center in Grand Forks, North Dakota, as members of the Great West Conference. This was the last season that North Dakota was known as the Fighting Sioux; following years of controversy, the university announced plans stop using the nickname by April 2011. The team went without a nickname for the next four seasons, later adopting the nickname Fighting Hawks in 2015.

After finishing 3rd in the Great West during the regular season, the Fighting Sioux won three straight games in the Great West tournament by a total of four points, capped off with a double-overtime victory over South Dakota to win the Great West tournament championship.

As a recently formed conference, the Great West Conference was not eligible for an automatic bid to the NCAA Division I men's basketball tournament. Instead, as the Great West champion, North Dakota was given an automatic bid to the 2011 CIT. The Fighting Sioux were eliminated in the first round of the tournament by Air Force, 77–67.

== Roster ==
2010–11 North Dakota Fighting Sioux men's basketball team
Players
Coaches

Pos.	#	Name	Height	Weight	Year	Hometown
G	0	Aaron Anderson	5 ft 10 in (1.78 m)	—	Fr	Brooklyn Park, Minnesota
G	2	Nick Haugen	6 ft 2 in (1.88 m)	—	So	Rockford, Minnesota
C	4	Mike Mathison	6 ft 10 in (2.08 m)	—	Jr	Walhalla, North Dakota
G/F	5	Troy Huff	6 ft 4 in (1.93 m)	—	Fr	Milwaukee, Wisconsin
G	11	Jamal Webb	6 ft 1 in (1.85 m)	—	Fr	Buffalo, New York
G	12	Jordan Allard	6 ft 7 in (2.01 m)	—	So	Fargo, North Dakota
C	22	Mitch Wilmer	6 ft 11 in (2.11 m)	—	So	Warroad, Minnesota
F	23	Spencer Goodman	6 ft 5 in (1.96 m)	—	So	Jackson, Missouri
F/C	24	Brandon Brekke	6 ft 6 in (1.98 m)	—	RS Fr	East Grand Forks, Minnesota
G/F	31	Chris Clausen	6 ft 6 in (1.98 m)	—	Sr	Adelaide, Australia
G	32	Josh Schuler	6 ft 2 in (1.88 m)	—	RS Fr	Urbana, Ohio
F/C	33	Doug Archer	6 ft 7 in (2.01 m)	—	So	Conception Junction, Missouri
F	40	Dan Stockdale	6 ft 7 in (2.01 m)	—	So	Sheboygan, Wisconsin
F	44	Derek Benter	6 ft 7 in (2.01 m)	—	Sr	Crosby, North Dakota
G	45	Patrick Mitchell	6 ft 8 in (2.03 m)	—	Jr	Des Moines, Iowa

Head coach

- Brian Jones (Northern Iowa)

Assistant coach(es)

- Ryan Moody (Benedictine (KS))
- Bryan Martin (Simpson)
- Nate Philippe (Saint Mary's (Halifax))

Legend

- (C) Team captain
- (S) Suspended
- (I) Ineligible
- (W) Walk-on
- Injured
- Current redshirt

Roster
Last update: January 19, 2023

== Schedule and results ==
Date time, TV	Rank^{#}	Opponent^{#}	Result	Record	Site (attendance) city, state
Regular season
November 12, 2010*; 7:00 pm		Waldorf	W 77–46	1–0	Betty Engelstad Sioux Center (1,619); Grand Forks, ND
November 16, 2010*; 7:00 pm		at Wisconsin	L 53–85	1–1	Kohl Center (17,230); Madison, WI
November 19, 2010*; 7:00 pm		Sacramento State	W 64–60	2–1	Betty Engelstad Sioux Center (1,280); Grand Forks, ND
November 23, 2010*; 8:00 pm		IPFW	L 61–71	2–2	Betty Engelstad Sioux Center (1,803); Grand Forks, ND
November 27, 2010*; 8:00 pm		at Northern Iowa	L 52–65	2–3	McLeod Center (4,240); Cedar Falls, IA
December 3, 2010*; 10:00 pm		at Idaho; Basketball Travelers Classic	L 42–63	2–4	Memorial Gymnasium (613); Moscow, ID
December 4, 2010*; 7:30 pm		vs. Eastern Michigan; Basketball Travelers Classic	W 54–49	3–4	Memorial Gymnasium (896); Moscow, ID
December 5, 2010*; 5:30 pm		vs. Monmouth; Basketball Travelers Classic	L 52–57	3–5	Memorial Gymnasium (417); Moscow, ID
December 11, 2010*; 7:00 pm		at North Dakota State	L 55–81	3–6	Fargodome (10,709); Fargo, ND
December 14, 2010*; 7:00 pm		Mayville State	W 74–57	4–6	Betty Engelstad Sioux Center (1,104); Grand Forks, ND
December 18, 2010*; 7:30 pm		at UMKC	L 61–69	4–7	Swinney Recreation Center (1,034); Kansas City, MO
December 20, 2010*; 7:00 pm		at Green Bay	L 68–72	4–8	Resch Center (1,934); Green Bay, WI
December 30, 2010*; 7:00 pm		South Dakota Mines	W 73–64	5–8	Betty Engelstad Sioux Center (1,326); Grand Forks, ND
January 3, 2011*; 3:00 pm		at Nebraska	L 46–77	5–9	Bob Devaney Sports Center (7,579); Lincoln, NE
January 9, 2011*; 6:00 pm		Longwood	W 90–74	6–9	Betty Engelstad Sioux Center (1,301); Grand Forks, ND
January 13, 2011*; 8:00 pm		Minot State	W 79–50	7–9	Betty Engelstad Sioux Center (1,895); Grand Forks, ND
January 15, 2011; 3:00 pm		South Dakota	W 75–62	8–9 (1–0)	Betty Engelstad Sioux Center (2,778); Grand Forks, ND
January 20, 2011; 8:00 pm		Utah Valley	L 96–107 ^{4OT}	8–10 (1–1)	Betty Engelstad Sioux Center (1,587); Grand Forks, ND
January 27, 2011; 8:00 pm		Texas–Pan American	W 91–82	9–10 (2–1)	Betty Engelstad Sioux Center (1,728); Grand Forks, ND
January 29, 2011; 3:00 pm		Houston Baptist	W 83–73	10–10 (3–1)	Betty Engelstad Sioux Center (2,185); Grand Forks, ND
February 5, 2011; 8:00 pm		at South Dakota	W 83–73	11–10 (4–1)	DakotaDome (2,867); Vermillion, SD
February 10, 2011; 6:30 pm		at NJIT	L 49–65	11–11 (4–2)	Fleisher Center (391); Newark, NJ
February 12, 2011; 4:30 pm		at Chicago State	W 80–70	12–11 (5–2)	Emil and Patricia Jones Convocation Center (1,024); Chicago, IL
February 16, 2011*; 7:00 pm		Louisiana Tech	W 76–73	13–11	Betty Engelstad Sioux Center (1,709); Grand Forks, ND
February 19, 2011; 8:00 pm		at Utah Valley	L 64–67	13–12 (5–3)	UCCU Center (2,244); Orem, UT
February 21, 2011*; 8:00 pm		at Northern Colorado	L 69–87	13–13	Butler–Hancock Pavilion (1,931); Greeley, CO
February 26, 2011; 1:00 pm		NJIT	L 52–59	13–14 (5–4)	Betty Engelstad Sioux Center (2,039); Grand Forks, ND
February 28, 2011; 8:00 pm		Chicago State	W 74–52	14–14 (6–4)	Betty Engelstad Sioux Center (1,731); Grand Forks, ND
March 3, 2011; 7:30 pm		at Houston Baptist	W 74–70 ^{OT}	15–14 (7–4)	Sharp Gymnasium (689); Houston, TX
March 5, 2011; 7:30 pm		at Texas–Pan American	W 72–61	16–14 (8–4)	UTPA Fieldhouse (639); Edinburg, TX
Great West tournament
March 10, 2011; 6:00 pm	(3)	vs. (6) Texas–Pan American; Great West Quarterfinals	W 71–70	17–14	UCCU Center (312); Orem, UT
March 11, 2011; 6:00 pm	(3)	vs. (7) Houston Baptist; Great West Semifinals	W 65–63	18–14	UCCU Center (445); Orem, UT
March 12, 2011; 8:30 pm	(3)	vs. (4) South Dakota; Great West Championship	W 71–70 ^{2OT}	19–14	UCCU Center (1,117); Orem, UT
CollegeInsider.com tournament
March 15, 2011; 8:00 pm		at Air Force; CIT First Round	L 67–77	19–15	Clune Arena (1,137); Colorado Springs, CO
*Non-conference game. ^{#}Rankings from AP Poll. (#) Tournament seedings in parentheses. All times are in Central Time.
