= Tracy Dildy =

American college basketball coach

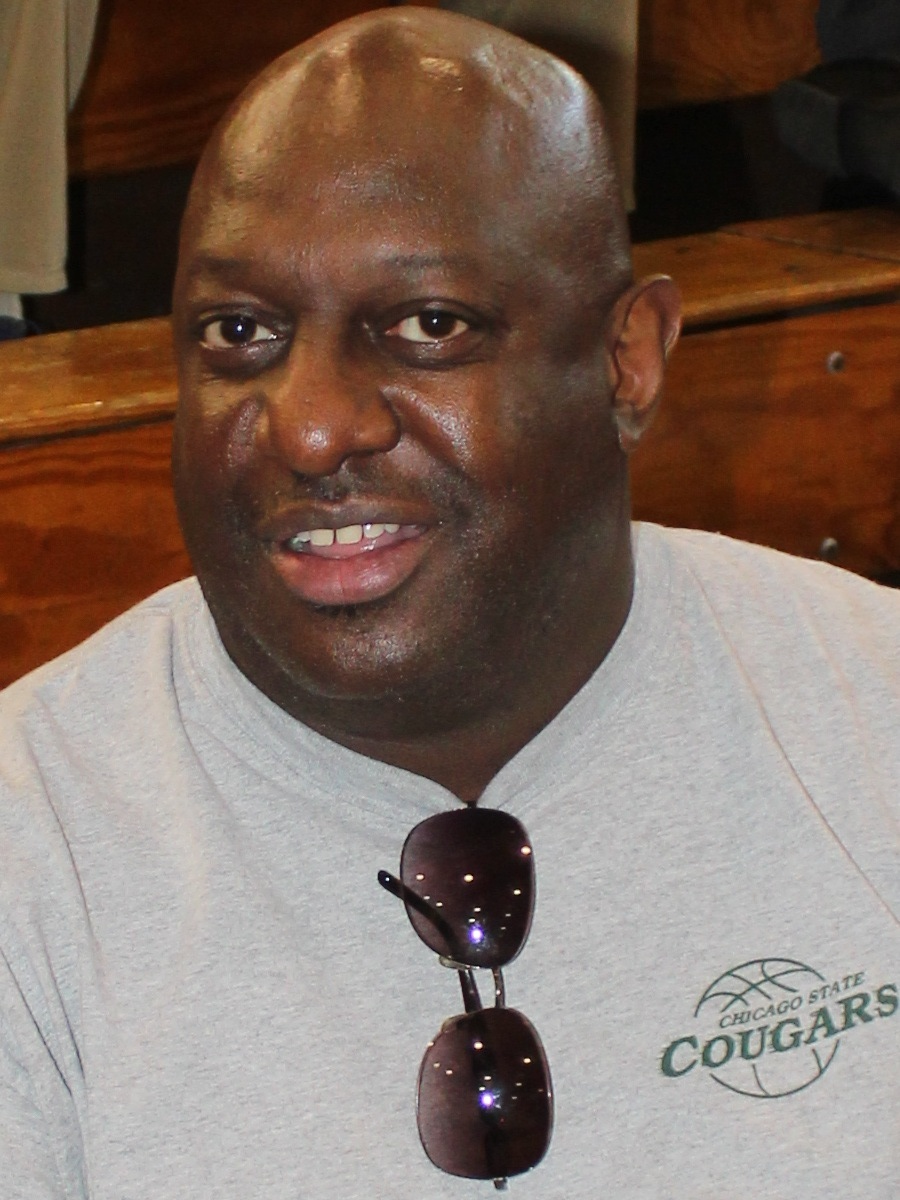

Biographical details
- Born: November 26, 1966 (age 59); Chicago, Illinois, U.S.

Playing career
- 1985–1987: San Diego State
- 1987–1989: UIC
- Position: Point guard

Coaching career (HC unless noted)
- 1994–1997: Ball State (asst.)
- 1997–2002: DePaul (asst.)
- 2002–2004: Auburn (asst.)
- 2004–2006: Ole Miss (asst.)
- 2006–2007: UAB (asst.)
- 2007–2010: UIC (asst.)
- 2010–2018: Chicago State
- 2018–2022: Detroit Mercy (asst.)

Administrative career (AD unless noted)
- 2016–2017: Chicago State (interim)

Head coaching record
- Overall: 55–200 (.216)

Accomplishments and honors

Championships
- Great West tournament championship (2013)

Tracy Heath Dildy (born November 26, 1966) is an American college basketball coach. As of January 2019 he was an assistant coach at Detroit Mercy. He is also the former head men's basketball coach for Chicago State University, replacing Benjy Taylor as head coach of the Cougars on July 12, 2010. He coached the 2012–2013 team to a Great West Conference championship.

== Head coaching record ==
Record table
Season	Team	Overall	Conference	Standing	Postseason
Chicago State Cougars (Great West Conference) (2010–2013)
2010–11	Chicago State	6–26	3–9	5th	
2011–12	Chicago State	4–26	2–8	6th	
2012–13	Chicago State	11–22	3–5	3rd	CIT First Round
Chicago State Cougars (Western Athletic Conference) (2013–2018)
2013–14	Chicago State	13–19	8–8	4th	
2014–15	Chicago State	8–24	4–10	T–7th	
2015–16	Chicago State	4–28	0–14	8th	
2016–17	Chicago State	6–26	1–13	8th	
2017–18	Chicago State	3–29	1–13	8th	
Chicago State:		55–200 (.216)	22–80 (.216)		
Total:		55–200 (.216)			
National champion Postseason invitational champion Conference regular season champion Conference regular season and conference tournament champion Division regular season champion Division regular season and conference tournament champion Conference tournament champion
