= 2012–13 NJIT Highlanders men's basketball team =

American college basketball season

2012–13 NJIT Highlanders men's basketball

Great West Regular Season Champions
- Conference: Great West Conference
- Record: 16–13 (6–2 Great West)
- Head coach: Jim Engles (5th season)
- Assistant coaches: Mike Spisto; Brian Kennedy; Michael Brown
- Home arena: Fleisher Center

2012–13 Great West Conference men's basketball standings
	Conf.				Overall
Team	W		L	PCT	W		L	PCT
NJIT	6	–	2	.750	16	–	13	.552
Texas–Pan American	5	–	3	.625	16	–	16	.500
Chicago State †	3	–	5	.375	11	–	22	.333
Houston Baptist	3	–	5	.375	14	–	17	.452
Utah Valley	3	–	5	.375	14	–	18	.438
† 2013 Great West tournament winner As of March 20, 2013; Rankings from AP Poll

The 2012–13 NJIT Highlanders men's basketball team represented New Jersey Institute of Technology during the 2012–13 NCAA Division I men's basketball season. The Highlanders, led by fifth year head coach Jim Engles, played their home games at the Fleisher Center and were members of the Great West Conference. They finished the season 16–13, 6–2 in Great West play to win the regular season conference championship. They lost in the semifinals of the Great West tournament to Houston Baptist.

This was their final year as a member of the Great West as the conference was disbanded when most of its members joined different conference beginning in the 2013–14 season. NJIT was unable to find conference membership and became the only Division I men's basketball independent for 2013–14.

== Roster ==
Number	Name	Position	Height	Weight	Year	Hometown
0	Ky Howard	Guard	6–3	185	Freshman	Philadelphia, Pennsylvania
1	Chris Flores	Guard	6–2	195	Senior	Dorchester, Massachusetts
2	PJ Miller	Guard	6–3	175	Senior	Fort Washington, Maryland
10	Daquan Holiday	Forward	6–7	205	Sophomore	Allentown, Pennsylvania
11	Winfield Willis	Guard	6–0	180	Sophomore	Baltimore, Maryland
12	Mitch Farrell	Guard	6–3	185	Freshman	Brechin, Canada
14	Ryan Woods	Guard/Forward	6–5	210	Senior	Staten Island, New York
15	Terrence Smith	Forward	6–6	195	Freshman	Fort Lauderdale, Florida
21	Quentin Bastian	Forward	6–6	240	Junior	Port Richey, Florida
22	Odera Nweke	Forward/Guard	6–5	210	Sophomore	Richmond, Texas
23	Nigel Sydnor	Guard	6–2	210	Freshman	Baltimore, Maryland
24	Emmanuel Tselentakis	Guard	6–5	200	Sophomore	Thessaloniki, Greece
50	Sean McCarthy	Center	6–10	265	Senior	Scituate, Massachusetts

== Schedule and results ==
Date time, TV	Rank^{#}	Opponent^{#}	Result	Record	Site (attendance) city, state
Regular season
11/10/2012*; 2:00pm		at Providence	L 63–64	0–1	Dunkin' Donuts Center (5,739); Providence, RI
11/13/2012*; 7:30 pm		Eastern Nazarene	W 76–43	1–1	Fleisher Center (356); Newark, NJ
11/18/2011*; 7:30 pm		at South Carolina State	L 74–77	1–2	SHM Memorial Center (N/A); Orangeburg, SC
11/21/2012*; 7:30 pm		New Hampshire	W 69–67	2–2	Fleisher Center (301); Newark, NJ
11/24/2012*; 2:00 pm		South Carolina State	W 72–63	3–2	Fleisher Center (177); Newark, NJ
11/27/2012*; 7:30 pm		Lyndon State	W 98–42	4–2	Fleisher Center (411); Newark, NJ
12/01/2012*; 12:00 pm		at St. John's	L 49–57	4–3	Carnesecca Arena (4,314); Queens, NY
12/04/2012*; 7:05 pm		at Seton Hall	L 59–68	4–4	Prudential Center (6,203); Newark, NJ
12/11/2012*; 6:30 pm		Army	W 69–67	5–4	Fleisher Center (619); Newark, NJ
12/13/2012*; 7:30 pm		North Carolina A&T	L 71–76	5–5	Fleisher Center (659); Newark, NJ
12/22/2012*; 1:00 pm		City College of New York	W 71–43	6–5	Fleisher Center (491); Newark, NJ
12/28/2012*; 6:00 pm, ESPN3		at Villanova	L 60–70	6–6	The Pavilion (6,500); Villanova, PA
12/30/2012*; 3:20 pm		St. Francis Brooklyn	L 87–89	6–7	Fleisher Center (605); Newark, NJ
01/02/2013*; 6:00 pm		at Lafayette	L 66–83	6–8	Kirby Sports Center (889); Easton, PA
01/05/2013; 8:05 pm, UVU-TV		at Utah Valley	W 57–52	7–8 (1–0)	UCCU Center (3,134); Orem, UT
01/12/2013; 3:20 pm		Chicago State	W 83–78 ^{3OT}	8–8 (2–0)	Fleisher Center (277); Newark, NJ
01/14/2013*; 6:00 pm		at Fairleigh Dickinson	W 66–63	9–8	Rothman Center (412); Hackensack, NJ
01/17/2013*; 6:30 pm		Penn	L 53–54	9–9	Fleisher Center (455); Newark, NJ
01/21/2013*; 7:00 pm		at New Orleans	L 94–96 ^{3OT}	9–10	Lakefront Arena (481); New Orleans, LA
01/26/2013; 3:00 pm		Texas–Pan American	W 64–51	10–10 (3–0)	Fleisher Center (401); Newark, NJ
01/30/2013*; 6:30 pm		Fisher	W 108–69	11–10	Fleisher Center (301); Newark, NJ
02/02/2013; 2:05 pm, Legacy Sports Network		at Houston Baptist	L 57–66	11–11 (3–1)	Sharp Gymnasium (528); Houston, TX
02/06/2013*; 6:00 pm		at Colgate	W 77–58	12–11	Cotterell Court (276); Hamilton, NY
02/09/2013; 5:00 pm, CSU TV		at Chicago State	W 63–58	13–11 (4–1)	Emil and Patricia Jones Convocation Center (418); Chicago, IL
02/16/2013; 3:20 pm		Utah Valley	W 63–55	14–11 (5–1)	Fleisher Center (409); Newark, NJ
02/23/2013*; 1:00 pm		New Orleans	W 84–64	15–11	Fleisher Center (377); Newark, NJ
03/02/2013; 3:00 pm		Houston Baptist	W 69–58	16–11 (6–1)	Fleisher Center (1,500); Newark, NJ
03/09/2013; 7:00 pm, Broncs Live		at Texas–Pan American	L 59–76	16–12 (6–2)	UTPA Fieldhouse (751); Edinburg, TX
2013 Great West Conference men's basketball tournament
03/15/2013; 5:00 pm		vs. Houston Baptist; Semifinals	L 61–62	16–13	Emil and Patricia Jones Convocation Center (1,271); Chicago, IL
*Non-conference game. ^{#}Rankings from AP Poll. (#) Tournament seedings in parentheses. All times are in Central.
