= 2012–13 Utah Valley Wolverines men's basketball team =

American college basketball season

2012–13 Utah Valley Wolverines men's basketball
- Conference: Great West Conference
- Record: 14–18 (3–5 Great West)
- Head coach: Dick Hunsaker (11th season)
- Assistant coaches: Mike Kelly; Steve Payne; Paul Moss
- Home arena: UCCU Center

2012–13 Great West Conference men's basketball standings
	Conf.				Overall
Team	W		L	PCT	W		L	PCT
NJIT	6	–	2	.750	16	–	13	.552
Texas–Pan American	5	–	3	.625	16	–	16	.500
Chicago State †	3	–	5	.375	11	–	22	.333
Houston Baptist	3	–	5	.375	14	–	17	.452
Utah Valley	3	–	5	.375	14	–	18	.438
† 2013 Great West tournament winner As of March 20, 2013; Rankings from AP Poll

The 2012–13 Utah Valley Wolverines men's basketball team represented Utah Valley University in the 2012–13 college basketball season. This was head coach Dick Hunsaker's eleventh season at UVU. The Wolverines played their home games at the UCCU Center and were members of the Great West Conference. They finished the season 14–18, 3–5 in Great West play to finish in a three way tie for third place. They lost in the first round of the Great West tournament to Houston Baptist.

This was Utah Valley's final season in the Great West. The Wolverines will join the WAC starting in the 2013–14 season.

== Roster ==
2012–13 Utah Valley Wolverines men's basketball team
Players
Coaches

Pos.	#	Name	Height	Weight	Year	Previous school	Hometown
G	2	Antoine Hosley	6 ft 0 in (1.83 m)	—	Jr	Jefferson; North Idaho	Portland, OR
G	3	Keawe Enos	6 ft 1 in (1.85 m)	—	Jr	Red Mountain; Mesa CC	Mesa, AZ
G	11	Jason Johnson	6 ft 3 in (1.91 m)	—	Jr	Cleveland; Antelope Valley	Reseda, CA
G	12	Holton Hunsaker	6 ft 0 in (1.83 m)	—	Jr	Woods Cross	North Salt Lake City, UT
G/F	14	Justin Johnson	6 ft 6 in (1.98 m)	—	Fr	Green River	Green River, UT
F	20	Alfonzo Hubbard	6 ft 4 in (1.93 m)	—	Sr	Gallup; Salt Lake Community College	Gallup, NM
F	22	Nick Thompson	6 ft 9 in (2.06 m)	—	Sr	Clearfield; Oklahoma	Clearfield, UT
F	24	Zach Jones	6 ft 8 in (2.03 m)	—	Sr	Arcadia; Central Arizona	Phoenix, AZ
G	32	Taylor Brown	6 ft 5 in (1.96 m)	—	Jr	Alta	Draper, UT
C	34	Ben Aird	6 ft 9 in (2.06 m)	—	Jr	Bountiful	Bountiful, UT
C	45	Will Sinclair	6 ft 8 in (2.03 m)	—	So	Lilydale Heights College	Lilydale, Victoria

Head coach

- Dick Hunsaker (Weber State)

Assistant coach(es)

- Mike Kelly (Westmont)
- Steve Payne (Ball State)
- Paul Moss (Utah)

Legend

- (C) Team captain
- (S) Suspended
- (I) Ineligible
- (W) Walk-on
- Injured
- Current redshirt

== Schedule and results ==
Date time, TV	Opponent	Result	Record	High points	High rebounds	High assists	Site (attendance) city, state
Regular season
11/09/2012*; 2:00 pm	at IUPUI	L 54–67	0–1	19 – Hart	13 – Aird	5 – Rice	IUPUI Gymnasium (507); Indianapolis, IN
11/12/2012*; 5:00 pm	at North Carolina A&T	W 64–55	1–1	18 – Aird	14 – Thompson	5 – Thompson	Corbett Sports Center (947); Greensboro, NC
11/14/2012*; 8:00 pm, P12N	at Washington State; CBE Hall of Fame Classic	L 49–72	1–2	10 – Aird	5 – Aird	2 – Thompson, Hunsaker, Hosley, & Enos	Beasley Coliseum (2,023); Pullman, WA
11/17/2012*; 1:05 pm, UVU-TV	Arizona Christian	W 96–70	2–2	20 – Thompson	7 – Thompson	5 – Hunsaker	UCCU Center (723); Orem, UT
11/20/2012*; 7:00 pm	vs. Eastern Washington; CBE Hall of Fame Classic	W 86–83	3–2	25 – Aird	10 – Thompson	7 – Thompson	Leavey Center (1,169); Santa Clara, CA
11/21/2012*; 9:00 pm	at Santa Clara; CBE Hall of Fame Classic	L 67–75	3–3	19 – Hubbard	7 – Aird	4 – Thompson	Leavey Center (1,222); Santa Clara, CA
11/23/2012*; 3:00 pm	vs. USC Upstate; CBE Hall of Fame Classic	L 50–75	3–4	14 – Hosley	9 – Aird	4 – Thompson	Leavey Center (1,156); Santa Clara, CA
11/27/2012*; 5:00 pm	at North Carolina Central	L 52–70	3–5	12 – Aird	9 – Aird	3 – Hubbard	McLendon-McDougald Gymnasium (735); Durham, NC
12/01/2012*; 7:05 pm, UVU-TV	Pepperdine	W 67–63 ^{OT}	4–5	22 – Hunsaker	9 – Aird	7 – Thompson	UCCU Center (3,427); Orem, UT
12/05/2012*; 7:00 pm, Big Sky TV	at Weber State; Old Oquirrh Bucket	L 56–89	4–6	12 – Thompson, Hunsaker	7 – Hubbard	2 – Aird, Johnson, Brown	Dee Events Center (5,553); Ogden, UT
12/08/2012*; 8:00 pm	at Troy	W 86–82 ^{2OT}	5–6	32 – Hunsaker	12 – Thompson	7 – Thompson	Trojan Arena (1,256); Troy, AL
12/15/2012*; 7:05 pm, UVU-TV; FCS	Utah State; Old Oquirrh Bucket	L 63–69	5–7	17 – Hubbard, Hunsaker	6 – Aird	3 – Thompson	UCCU Center (4,033); Orem, UT
12/19/2012*; 7:05 pm, UVU-TV	Troy	W 67–64 ^{OT}	6–7	18 – Aird	12 – Thompson	4 – Thompson, Hunsaker	UCCU Center (1,009); Orem, UT
12/22/2012*; 4:05 pm, UVU-TV	North Carolina Central	L 67–73	6–8	19 – Thompson, Hubbard	9 – Hubbard	6 – Hunsaker	UCCU Center (548); Orem, UT
12/28/2012*; 2:30 pm	vs. Austin Peay; Dr. Pepper Classic at Chattanooga	W 84–77	7–8	26 – Aird	10 – Thompson	12 – Thompson	McKenzie Arena (2,568); Chattanooga, TN
12/29/2012*; 5:00 pm	at Chattanooga; Dr. Pepper Classic at Chattanooga Championship	L 69–76	7–9	37 – Hunsaker	13 – Aird	4 – Aird, Brown	McKenzie Arena (2,534); Chattanooga, TN
01/05/2013; 7:05 pm, UVU-TV	NJIT	L 52–57	7–10 (0–1)	26 – Aird	13 – Aird	5 – Enos	UCCU Center (3,134); Orem, UT
01/09/2013*; 6:05 pm	at UMKC	W 78–66	8–10	18 – Thompson, Hubbard, Aird	9 – Thompson	6 – Thompson	Swinney Recreation Center (905); Kansas City, MO
01/12/2013; 7:05 pm, UVU-TV	Houston Baptist	W 83–62	9–10 (1–1)	24 – Hubbard	9 – Aird	8 – Thompson	UCCU Center (3,320); Orem, UT
01/19/2013; 6:00 pm, Broncs Live	at Texas–Pan America	L 60–62	9–11 (1–2)	18 – Hunsaker	14 – Aird	5 – Thompson	UTPA Fieldhouse (1,145); Edinburg, TX
01/26/2013; 2:30 pm, CSU TV	at Chicago State	L 54–62	9–12 (1–3)	16 – Thompson	13 – Thompson	3 – Hunsaker	Emil and Patricia Jones Convocation Center (316); Chicago, IL
01/28/2013*; 7:05 pm, UVU-TV Streaming Events	Peru State	W 84–49	10–12	21 – Hunsaker	10 – Thompson	4 – Hunsaker	UCCU Center (890); Orem, UT
02/02/2013*; 8:00 pm	at Cal State Bakersfield	L 62–75	10–13	15 – Aird	8 – Aird	6 – Hunsaker	Icardo Center (1,086); Bakersfield, CA
02/09/2013; 7:05 pm, UVU-TV	Texas–Pan America	W 66–49	11–13 (2–3)	15 – Aird, Johnson	12 – Aird	8 – Thompson	UCCU Center (2,485); Orem, UT
02/11/2013*; 7:05 pm, UVU-TV Streaming Events	Northern New Mexico	W 86–63	12–13	16 – Aird, Hosley	15 – Aird	5 – Johnson, Hunsaker	UCCU Center (1,524); Orem, UT
02/16/2013; 2:20 pm, Highlanders All Access	at NJIT	L 55–63	12–14 (2–4)	16 – Johnson	9 – Aird	4 – Thompson	Fleisher Center (409); Newark, NJ
02/18/2013*; 7:05 pm, UVU-TV Streaming Events	Pacific Union	W 73–43	13–14	18 – Jones	16 – Thompson	4 – Johnson, Brown	UCCU Center (1,524); Orem, UT
02/23/2013; 6:05 pm, Legacy Sports Network	at Houston Baptist	L 63–73	13–15 (2–5)	26 – Hunsaker	13 – Aird	4 – Thompson	Sharp Gymnasium (520); Houston, TX
02/26/2013*; 6:00 pm, NDSU All Access	at North Dakota State	L 56–63	13–16	25 – Aird	9 – Thompson	3 – Hunsaker	Bison Sports Arena (2,351); Fargo, ND
03/02/2013; 7:05 pm, UVU-TV	Chicago State	W 76–69	14–16 (3–5)	24 – Johnson	10 – Thompson	7 – Thompson	UCCU Center (3,138); Orem, UT
03/09/2013*; 7:05 pm, UVU-TV	Cal State Bakersfield	L 58–73	14–17	20 – Johnson	13 – Aird	2 – Thompson, Aird, Brown	UCCU Center (3,826); Orem, UT
2013 Great West Conference men's basketball tournament
03/14/2013; 4:00 pm	vs. Houston Baptist; First Round	L 74–76 ^{2OT}	14–18	22 – Thompson	13 – Thompson	4 – Thompson, Hunsaker, Johnson	Emil and Patricia Jones Convocation Center (N/A); Chicago, IL
*Non-conference game. ^{#}Rankings from AP Poll. (#) Tournament seedings in parentheses.
