= 2012–13 Texas–Pan American Broncs men's basketball team =

American college basketball season

2012–13 Texas–Pan American Broncs men's basketball
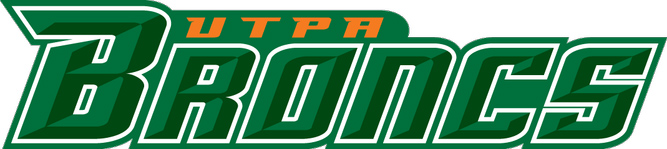
- Conference: Great West Conference
- Record: 16–16 (5–3 Great West)
- Head coach: Ryan Marks (4th season)
- Assistant coaches: Tim Anderson; Nick Bennett; Joel Weiss
- Home arena: UTPA Fieldhouse

2012–13 Great West Conference men's basketball standings
	Conf.				Overall
Team	W		L	PCT	W		L	PCT
NJIT	6	–	2	.750	16	–	13	.552
Texas–Pan American	5	–	3	.625	16	–	16	.500
Chicago State †	3	–	5	.375	11	–	22	.333
Houston Baptist	3	–	5	.375	14	–	17	.452
Utah Valley	3	–	5	.375	14	–	18	.438
† 2013 Great West tournament winner As of March 20, 2013; Rankings from AP Poll

The 2012–13 Texas–Pan American Broncs men's basketball team represented the University of Texas–Pan American during the 2012–13 NCAA Division I men's basketball season. This was head coach Ryan Mark's fourth season at UTPA. The Broncs played their home games at the UTPA Fieldhouse and were members of the Great West Conference. They finished the season 16–16. 5–3 in Great West play to finish in second place. They lost in the semifinals of the Great West tournament to Chicago State. On March 18, head coach Ryan Marks was fired after posting a record of 39–89 in four seasons.

This was the Broncs last season in the Great West. The Broncs will join the Western Athletic Conference for the 2013–14 season.

== Roster ==
2012–13 UTPA Broncs men's basketball team
Players
Coaches

Pos.	#	Name	Height	Weight	Year	Previous school	Hometown
G	1	Brandon Provost	6 ft 3 in (1.91 m)	189 lb (86 kg)	Sr	Seven Lakes; Air Force	Katy, TX
G	2	Blake Provost (redshirt)	5 ft 10 in (1.78 m)	170 lb (77 kg)	Fr	Katy Taylor	Katy, TX
G	3	Aaron Urbanus	6 ft 0 in (1.83 m)	147 lb (67 kg)	Sr	James Bowie	Austin, TX
G	4	Jamal Dantzler	6 ft 3 in (1.91 m)	190 lb (86 kg)	Jr	Von Stuben; Kennedy-King	Chicago, IL
G	5	DeMarko Nash	5 ft 10 in (1.78 m)	160 lb (73 kg)	Jr	Lincoln Park; Kennedy-King	Chicago, IL
G/F	11	Aly Hudgins	6 ft 5 in (1.96 m)	201 lb (91 kg)	Fr	James Richards; Fishburne Military	Oppegård, Norway
F	13	Ruben Cabrera	6 ft 7 in (2.01 m)	245 lb (111 kg)	Sr	Marianapolis Prep; Collin	Bayamón, Puerto Rico
G	14	AJ Moutry	6 ft 1 in (1.85 m)	180 lb (82 kg)	Fr	McKinney	McKinney, TX
G	20	Wes Koral	6 ft 3 in (1.91 m)	190 lb (86 kg)	Fr	Wheaton Academy; St. John's Northwest Military	Naperville, IL
F	21	Lauri Toivonen	6 ft 7 in (2.01 m)	215 lb (98 kg)	So	Makelanrinne; Ohlone JC	Riihimäki, Finland
G	23	Jesus Delgado	6 ft 4 in (1.93 m)	200 lb (91 kg)	Sr	Montwood; Collin	El Paso, TX
F	24	Shaquille Hines	6 ft 7 in (2.01 m)	195 lb (88 kg)	Fr	Harlan; Trent Prep High	Chicago, IL
F	25	Josh Cleveland	6 ft 6 in (1.98 m)	225 lb (102 kg)	Jr	Elsik	Houston, TX
G	30	Hurley Johnson	6 ft 1 in (1.85 m)	185 lb (84 kg)	Jr	Woods Haven Prep; Colby	Clewiston, FL
F	32	Justin Leathers	6 ft 5 in (1.96 m)	215 lb (98 kg)	Jr	Park Hill; Johnson County	Kansas City, MO
F	33	Noe Espericueta	6 ft 4 in (1.93 m)	215 lb (98 kg)	Fr	Edinburg	Edinburg, TX

Head coach

- Ryan Marks (USC)

Assistant coach(es)

- Tim Anderson (Oklahoma Panhandle State)
- Nick Bennett (UW–Stevens Point)
- Joel Weiss (Claremont McKenna)

Legend

- (C) Team captain
- (S) Suspended
- (I) Ineligible
- (W) Walk-on
- Injured
- Current redshirt

== Schedule and results ==
Date time, TV	Opponent	Result	Record	Site (attendance) city, state
Regular season
11/09/2012*; 8:00 pm, MC22/BTN Digital	at Iowa	L 55–86	0–1	Carver-Hawkeye Arena (14,859); Iowa City, IA
11/12/2012*; 7:00 pm, Bradley TV	at Bradley	L 61–78	0–2	Renaissance Coliseum (3,151); Peoria, IL
11/14/2012*; 7:00 pm, EMU Showcase	vs. Rochester; EMU "Ice Man" Classic	W 74–65	1–2	Convocation Center (90); Ypsilanti, MI
11/16/2012*; 4:30 pm, EMU Showcase	vs. IPFW; EMU "Ice Man" Classic	L 94–97 ^{3OT}	1–3	Convocation Center (N/A); Ypsilanti, MI
11/17/2012*; 4:30 pm, EMU Showcase	vs. Eastern Illinois; EMU "Ice Man" Classic	L 50–63	1–4	Convocation Center (83); Ypsilanti, MI
11/18/2012*; 7:00 pm, EMU Showcase	at Eastern Michigan; EMU "Ice Man" Classic	L 47–57	1–5	Convocation Center (938); Ypsilanti, MI
11/24/2012*; 7:00 pm, Broncs Live	SIU Edwardsville	W 77–66	2–5	UTPA Fieldhouse (305); Edinburg, TX
12/03/2012*; 7:00 pm, Broncs Live	Texas–Arlington	L 51–60	2–6	UTPA Fieldhouse (437); Edinburg, TX
12/08/2012*; 2:00 pm, Texas State Showcase	at Texas State	L 58–73	2–7	Strahan Coliseum (1,361); San Marcos, TX
12/13/2012*; 7:00 pm, Broncs Live	Eureka	W 92–64	3–7	UTPA Fieldhouse (460); Edinburg, TX
12/15/2012*; 7:00 pm, Broncs Live	Lamar	W 75–70	4–7	UTPA Fieldhouse (494); Edinburg, TX
12/19/2012*; 7:20 pm, Tulane All Access	at Tulane; Tulane Classic	L 49–76	4–8	Avron B. Fogelman Arena (1,502); New Orleans, LA
12/20/2011*; 4:00 pm, Tulane All Access	vs. Alabama State; Tulane Classic	W 76–70 ^{OT}	5–8	Avron B. Fogelman Arena (1,571); New Orleans, LA
12/22/2012*; 7:00 pm, Broncs Live	Nebraska–Omaha	W 80–72	6–8	UTPA Fieldhouse (383); Edinburg, TX
12/29/2012*; 9:30 pm, Portland Portal	at Portland	W 56–52	7–8	Chiles Center (1,296); Portland, OR
12/31/2012*; 4:00 pm, Pac-12 Network	at Oregon State	L 59–84	7–9	Gill Coliseum (3,276); Corvallis, OR
01/03/2013*; 7:00 pm, Houston All Access	Houston	L 71–96	7–10	Hofheinz Pavilion (3,113); Houston, TX
01/08/2013; 7:05 pm, Legacy Sports Network	at Houston Baptist	W 70–60	8–10 (1–0)	Sharp Gymnasium (617); Houston, TX
01/12/2013*; 7:00 pm, Broncs Live	Fisher	W 95–49	9–10	UTPA Fieldhouse (337); Edinburg, TX
01/19/2013; 7:00 pm, Broncs Live	Utah Valley	W 62–60	10–10 (2–0)	UTPA Fieldhouse (1,145); Edinburg, TX
01/26/2013; 3:00 pm, NJIT All Access	at NJIT	L 51–64	10–11 (2–1)	Fleisher Center (401); Newark, NJ
01/29/2013*; 7:00 pm, Broncs Live	Oklahoma Panhandle State	W 76–68	11–11	UTPA Fieldhouse (555); Edinburg, TX
02/02/2013; 7:00 pm, Broncs Live	Chicago State	W 68–65	12–11 (3–1)	UTPA Fieldhouse (615); Edinburg, TX
02/06/2013*; 7:00 pm, Privateers Showcase	at New Orleans	L 73–75 ^{OT}	12–12	Lakefront Arena (684); New Orleans, LA
02/09/2013; 8:05 pm, UVU-TV	at Utah Valley	L 49–66	12–13 (3–2)	UCCU Center (2,485); Orem, UT
02/14/2013*; 7:00 pm, Broncs Live	Cal State Bakersfield	W 79–73 ^{OT}	13–13	UTPA Fieldhouse (956); Edinburg, TX
02/16/2013; 7:00 pm, Broncs Live	Houston Baptist	L 48–53	13–14 (3–3)	UTPA Fieldhouse (2,101); Edinburg, TX
02/20/2013*; 7:00 pm	at Texas–Arlington	L 48–63	13–15	College Park Center (1,085); Arlington, TX
02/23/2013; 7:30 pm, CSU TV	at Chicago State	W 55–51	14–15 (4–3)	Emil and Patricia Jones Convocation Center (1,278); Chicago, IL
03/03/2013*; 2:00 pm, Broncs Live	New Orleans	W 71–57	15–15	UTPA Fieldhouse (361); Edinburg, TX
03/09/2013; 7:00 pm, Broncs Live	NJIT	W 76–59	16–15 (5–3)	UTPA Fieldhouse (751); Edinburg, TX
2013 Great West tournament
03/15/2013; 7:30 pm	vs. Chicago State	L 55–63	16–16	Emil and Patricia Jones Convocation Center (1,271); Chicago, IL
*Non-conference game. ^{#}Rankings from AP Poll. (#) Tournament seedings in parentheses. All times are in Central.
