= 2011 Great West Conference men's basketball tournament =

- Tournament logo
- Classification: Division I
- Season: 2010–11
- Teams: 7
- Site: UCCU Center; Orem, Utah
- Champions: North Dakota (1st title)
- Winning coach: Brian Jones (1st title)
- MVP: Patrick Mitchell (North Dakota)

2010–11 Great West Conference men's basketball standings
	Conf.				Overall
Team	W		L	PCT	W		L	PCT
Utah Valley	11	–	1	.917	19	–	11	.633
NJIT	9	–	3	.750	15	–	15	.500
North Dakota †	8	–	4	.667	19	–	15	.559
South Dakota	7	–	5	.583	18	–	15	.545
Chicago State	3	–	9	.250	6	–	26	.188
Texas–Pan American	2	–	10	.167	6	–	25	.194
Houston Baptist	2	–	10	.167	5	–	26	.161
† 2011 Great West tournament winner As of March 16, 2011; Rankings from AP Poll

The 2011 Great West Conference men's basketball tournament took place March 10–12, 2011 in Orem, Utah. According to National Collegiate Athletic Association (NCAA) regulations, as a new Division I conference the Great West champion does not receive an automatic bid into the NCAA tournament until 2020. However, 2011 champion North Dakota received an automatic bid to the 2011 CollegeInsider.com Tournament. In the 2010 tournament the South Dakota Coyotes defeated the Houston Baptist Huskies to claim their first basketball tournament championship.

The third seeded Fighting Sioux of North Dakota defeated 2010 Great West tournament champion South Dakota 77–76 in a double-overtime thriller. The Coyotes had upset number 1 seed Utah Valley in the semi-finals. The game was won on a three-pointer from Sioux guard Josh Schuler with four seconds remaining. The championship result was a fitting end to a tournament that saw all six games decided by a total of eleven points. North Dakota's Patrick Mitchell was named tournament MVP.

== Format ==
All seven conference members participated in the tournament with seeding based on results from the regular season; the number one seed received a bye to the semifinal round.

== Bracket ==
Quarterfinal round Thursday, March 10
4	South Dakota	73
5	Chicago State	70
2	NJIT	70
7	Houston Baptist	72
3	North Dakota	71
6	Texas–Pan American	70

Semifinal round Friday, March 11
1	Utah Valley	70
4	South Dakota	72
7	Houston Baptist	63
3	North Dakota	65

Championship round Saturday, March 12
4	South Dakota	76 ^{2OT}
3	North Dakota	77
