= 2013 Great West Conference men's basketball tournament =

- Classification: Division I
- Season: 2012–13
- Teams: 5
- Site: Emil and Patricia Jones Convocation Center; Chicago, IL
- Champions: Chicago State (1st title)
- Winning coach: Tracy Dildy (1st title)
- MVP: Nate Duhon (Chicago State)

2012–13 Great West Conference men's basketball standings
	Conf.				Overall
Team	W		L	PCT	W		L	PCT
NJIT	6	–	2	.750	16	–	13	.552
Texas–Pan American	5	–	3	.625	16	–	16	.500
Chicago State †	3	–	5	.375	11	–	22	.333
Houston Baptist	3	–	5	.375	14	–	17	.452
Utah Valley	3	–	5	.375	14	–	18	.438
† 2013 Great West tournament winner As of March 20, 2013; Rankings from AP Poll

The 2013 Great West Conference men's basketball tournament was held March 14–16, 2013, at the Emil and Patricia Jones Convocation Center in Chicago, Illinois. Per NCAA regulations as a new Division I conference, the Great West champion would not have received an automatic bid into the NCAA tournament until 2020; however, the winner was extended an automatic bid to the CollegeInsider.com Postseason Tournament.

This edition was to be the last Great West Conference Men's Basketball Tournament as Houston Baptist would depart the conference after the season to join the Southland Conference and Chicago State, Texas–Pan American and Utah Valley would depart the conference after the season to join the Western Athletic Conference, leaving the New Jersey Institute of Technology as its sole remaining member.

== Format ==
Chicago State re-established postseason eligibility (after failing for 2012) by meeting the NCAA's Academic Progress Rate requirements, but North Dakota had joined the Big Sky Conference for the 2012–13 season; as a result, the conference utilized the same five-team format they used for 2012 as the outline.

== Bracket ==
The entire tournament was streamed online by CSU-TV.

First round March 14, 2013
4	Houston Baptist	76
5	Utah Valley	74 ^{2OT}

Semifinal round March 15, 2013
1	NJIT	61
4	Houston Baptist	62
2	Texas–Pan American	55
3	Chicago State	63

Championship round March 16, 2013
4	Houston Baptist	60
3	Chicago State	75
