= 2012–13 New Orleans Privateers men's basketball team =

American college basketball season

2012–13 New Orleans Privateers men's basketball
- Conference: Independent
- Record: 8–18
- Head coach: Mark Slessinger (2nd season)
- Assistant coaches: Kenyon Spears; Kris Arkenberg; Kerwin Forges
- Home arena: Lakefront Arena

2012–13 NCAA Division I men's basketball independents standings
	Conf.				Overall
Team	W		L	PCT	W		L	PCT
Cal State Bakersfield		–		–	14	–	16	.467
New Orleans		–		–	8	–	18	.308
Rankings from AP Poll

The 2012–13 New Orleans Privateers men's basketball team represented the University of New Orleans during the 2012–13 NCAA Division I men's basketball season. The Privateers led by second year head coach Mark Slessinger, played their home games at Lakefront Arena and played as an independent. They finished the season 8–18. This was the Privateers last year as an independent as they will join the Southland Conference in July 2013.

== Roster ==
Number	Name	Position	Height	Weight	Year	Hometown
0	Tradarrius McPhearson	Guard	6–1	195	Junior	Edwards, Mississippi
1	Corey Blake	Guard	6–5	200	Junior	Lecompte, Louisiana
2	Darrell Williams	Guard	5–9	165	Senior	New Orleans, Louisiana
3	Rarlensee Nelson	Guard	5–8	180	Senior	Ville Platte, Louisiana
4	Cory Dixon	Forward	6–7	205	Junior	Argyle, Texas
5	Eddie Denard	Forward	6–5	240	Junior	Chicago, Illinois
10	Tommy Hobbs	Forward	6–5	200	Freshman	Anchorage, Alaska
11	Isaac Mack	Guard	6–1	170	Junior	Indianapolis, Indiana
12	Max Banchy	Guard	6–3	180	Junior	Stillwater, Minnesota
13	John Reese	Guard	6–4	175	Freshman	Leesville, Louisiana
15	Kevin Hill	Forward	6–7	210	Freshman	Marrero, Louisiana
20	Evans Ganapamo	Guard/Forward	6–5	185	Freshman	Mandeville, Louisiana
22	Mitchell Parker	Forward	6–8	195	Freshman	Tallahassee, Florida
24	Maurice County	Guard	6–1	195	Senior	Pineville, Louisiana
25	Benjamin James	Guard	6–3	200	Sophomore	Maurice, Louisiana
32	Lovell Cook	Forward	6–6	215	Senior	New Orleans, Louisiana
40	Travis Avery	Center	6–8	215	Freshman	Algiers, Louisiana

== Schedule ==
Date time, TV	Opponent	Result	Record	Site (attendance) city, state
Regular Season
11/09/2012; 8:00 pm	San Jose State	W 72–68	1–0	Lakefront Arena (1,419); New Orleans, LA
11/12/2012; 7:00 pm	Southern Illinois	L 55–72	1–1	Lakefront Arena (690); New Orleans, LA
11/15/2012; 7:00 pm	Bethune-Cookman	L 65–71	1–2	Lakefront Arena (471); New Orleans, LA
11/20/2012; 7:00 pm	Blue Mountain	W 99–51	2–2	Lakefront Arena (433); New Orleans, LA
11/26/2012; 6:30 pm	at Nicholls State	L 79–92	2–3	Stopher Gym (650); Thibodaux, LA
11/29/2012; 7:00 pm	Southeast Missouri State	L 67–83	2–4	Lakefront Arena (442); New Orleans, LA
12/08/2012; 6:00 pm	at Duquesne	L 70–88	2–5	A. J. Palumbo Center (2,646); Pittsburgh, PA
12/12/2012; 7:00 pm	Nicholls State	W 79–76	3–5	Lakefront Arena (584); New Orleans, LA
12/17/2012; 7:00 pm	at Southern Illinois	L 61–74	3–6	SIU Arena (5,031); Carbondale, IL
12/19/2012; 7:00 pm	at Southeast Missouri State	L 71–94	3–7	Show Me Center (1,820); Cape Girardeau, MO
12/23/2012; 3:00 pm	vs. Boise State; MGM Grand Garden Classic	L 51–67	3–8	MGM Grand Garden Arena (732); Paradise, NV
01/03/2013; 6:00 pm, CSS/ESPN3	at Mississippi State	L 46–97	3–9	Humphrey Coliseum (6,028); Starkville, MS
01/05/2013; 1:00 pm	at No. 17 Butler	L 44–57	3–10	Hinkle Fieldhouse (7,076); Indianapolis, IN
01/08/2013; 9:00 pm	at San Jose State	L 64–71	3–11	Event Center Arena (1,134); San Jose, CA
01/12/2013; 12:00 pm	Champion Baptist	W 87–50	4–11	Lakefront Arena (403); New Orleans, LA
01/19/2013; 7:00 pm	at Rice	L 71–95	4–12	Tudor Fieldhouse (1,423); Houston, TX
01/21/2013; 7:00 pm	NJIT	W 96–94 ^{3OT}	5–12	Lakefront Arena (481); New Orleans, LA
01/23/2013; 8:00 pm	at Air Force	L 48–90	5–13	Clune Arena (1,671); Colorado Springs, CO
01/26/2013; 12:00 pm	Champion Baptist	W 94–54	6–13	Lakefront Arena (N/A); New Orleans, LA
02/06/2013; 7:00 pm	Texas–Pan American	W 75–73 ^{OT}	7–13	Lakefront Arena (684); New Orleans, LA
02/09/2013; 12:00 pm	Houston Baptist	L 68–75 ^{OT}	7–14	Lakefront Arena (489); New Orleans, LA
02/18/2013; 7:00 pm	Central Baptist	W 100–59	8–14	Lakefront Arena (417); New Orleans, LA
02/21/2013; 6:00 pm	at Bowling Green	L 56–87	8–15	Stroh Center (1,517); Bowling Green, OH
02/23/2013; 1:00 pm	at NJIT	L 64–84	8–16	Fleisher Center (377); Newark, NJ
02/25/2013; 7:05 pm	at Houston Baptist	L 52–65	8–17	Sharp Gymnasium (581); Houston, TX
03/03/2013; 2:00 pm	at Texas–Pan American	L 57–71	8–18	UTPA Fieldhouse (361); Edinburg, TX
*Non-conference game. ^{#}Rankings from AP Poll. (#) Tournament seedings in parentheses. All times are in Central Time.
