= Marlon Stewart (basketball player) =

American basketball player (born 1997)

Personal information
- Born: February 18, 1997 (age 29)
- Listed height: 6 ft 3 in (1.91 m)
- Listed weight: 209 lb (95 kg)

Career information
- High school: North Scott (Eldridge, Iowa)
- College: Creighton (2015–2016); North Dakota (2017–2020)
- NBA draft: 2020: undrafted
- Playing career: 2021–2022
- Position: Point guard

Career history
- 2021: Kirchheim Knights
- 2021: Lakeland Magic
- 2021—2022: Birmingham Squadron
- 2022: Venados de Mazatlán
- 2022: Caballeros de Culiacán

Career highlights
- First team All–Summit League (2020); All–Summit League Tournament team (2020)

Marlon Stewart (born February 18, 1997) is an American former professional basketball player who last played for the Caballeros de Culiacán of the Circuito de Baloncesto de la Costa del Pacífico. He played college basketball for the North Dakota Fighting Hawks.

== High school ==
Stewart grew up in Rock Island, Illinois. He attended Davenport West High School during his freshman and sophomore years of high school, but then transferred to North Scott High School in Eldridge, Iowa. While there, he helped North Scott win their first-ever state championship in 2015 and was named to the 4A All-State first team.

=== Recruiting ===
On September 20, 2014, Stewart was offered by Creighton, then committed only two days later.

College recruiting
Name	Hometown	School	Height	Weight	Commit date
Marlon Stewart; PG	Eldridge, IA	North Scott (IA)	6 ft 3 in (1.91 m)	195 lb (88 kg)	Sep 22, 2014
Marlon Stewart; PG	Recruit ratings: Rivals: 247Sports: ESPN: (76)				
Overall recruit ranking:
Note: In many cases, Scout, Rivals, 247Sports, On3, and ESPN may conflict in their listings of height and weight.; In these cases, the average was taken. ESPN grades are on a 100-point scale.; Sources: "Creighton 2015 Basketball Commitments". Rivals.; "2015 Team Ranking". Rivals.

== College career ==
Stewart played for one year under Greg McDermott at Creighton before transferring to the University of North Dakota to play with former high school teammate Cortez Seales.

After redshirting during the 2016-17 season, Stewart was a three-year starter for the Fighting Hawks averaging 15 points, 3.8 rebounds, and 4 assists per game. He scored a career-high 35 points on February 22, 2020, against North Dakota State, which also included the game-winning shot as North Dakota won 71–68. Prior to his senior year, head coach Brian Jones left the team and Paul Sather was hired. During that year, the Fighting Hawks made it to the Summit League tournament championship game where they lost to North Dakota State. Stewart was named to the All-Tournament team and also was named during that year to the All-Summit League first team. He averaged 18.6 points, 5.5 rebounds and 5.1 assists per game.

== Professional career ==
=== Kirchheim Knights (2021) ===
On September 16, 2021, Stewart signed with the Kirchheim Knights of the German ProA league. He parted ways with the team on September 29.

=== Lakeland Magic (2021) ===
Stewart was selected with the 20th pick in the 2021 NBA G League draft by the Lakeland Magic. However, he was waived on December 1, after five appearances.

=== Birmingham Squadron (2021–2022) ===
After playing for the Birmingham Squadron in 2021, Stewart was then later waived on January 12, 2022.

=== Venados de Mazatlán (2022) ===
Stewart signed with the Venados de Mazatlán of the Circuito de Baloncesto de la Costa del Pacífico (CIBACOPA) ahead of the 2022 season. He recorded 28 points, four rebounds and four assists in the season opener, a 98–96 victory over the Caballeros de Culiacán. He made 20 appearances for the team, averaging 15 points per game.

=== Caballeros de Culiacán (2022) ===
Stewart joined the Caballeros de Culiacán, also in the CIBACOPA, in May 2022.

== Career stats ==
Legend
GP	Games played	GS	Games started	MPG	Minutes per game
FG%	Field goal percentage	3P%	3-point field goal percentage	FT%	Free throw percentage
RPG	Rebounds per game	APG	Assists per game	SPG	Steals per game
BPG	Blocks per game	PPG	Points per game	**Bold**	Career high

=== College ===
Per

Year	Team	GP	GS	MPG	FG%	3P%	FT%	RPG	APG	SPG	BPG	PPG
2015–16	Creighton	13	0	3.1	.231	.167		0.2	0.0	0.0	0.0	0.5
2017–18	North Dakota	32	31	28.1	.432	.303	.763	2.7	3.0	1.3	0.1	11.7
2018–19	North Dakota	19	15	31.8	.410	.326	.772	3.0	3.8	0.8	0.1	14.3
2019–20	North Dakota	33	33	34.2	.434	.356	.783	5.5	5.1	0.7	0.1	18.7
