= 2012–13 Chicago State Cougars men's basketball team =

American college basketball season

2012–13 Chicago State Cougars men's basketball
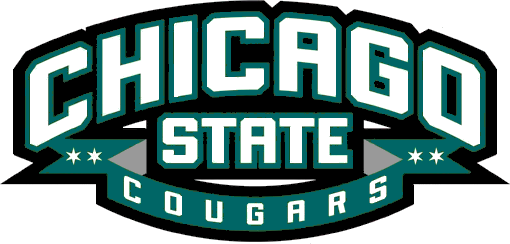

Great West tournament champions

CIT, First Round
- Conference: Great West Conference
- Record: 11–22 (3–5 Great West)
- Head coach: Tracy Dildy (3rd season)
- Assistant coaches: James Farr; Sean Pryor; Matt Raidbard
- Home arena: Emil and Patricia Jones Convocation Center

2012–13 Great West Conference men's basketball standings
	Conf.				Overall
Team	W		L	PCT	W		L	PCT
NJIT	6	–	2	.750	16	–	13	.552
Texas–Pan American	5	–	3	.625	16	–	16	.500
Chicago State †	3	–	5	.375	11	–	22	.333
Houston Baptist	3	–	5	.375	14	–	17	.452
Utah Valley	3	–	5	.375	14	–	18	.438
† 2013 Great West tournament winner As of March 20, 2013; Rankings from AP Poll

The 2012–13 Chicago State Cougars men's basketball team represented Chicago State University during the 2012–13 NCAA Division I men's basketball season. The Cougars, led by third year head coach Tracy Dildy, played their home games at the Emil and Patricia Jones Convocation Center as member of the Great West Conference. They finished the season 11–22, 3–5 in Great West play to finish in a three way tie for third place. They were champions of the Great West tournament, held on their home floor, to earn an automatic bid into the 2013 CIT where they lost in the first round to Illinois–Chicago.

This was Chicago State's final season in the Great West. They joined the Western Athletic Conference in July 2013.

== Roster ==
Number	Name	Position	Height	Weight	Year	Hometown
0	Corey Gray	Guard	5–11	180	Junior	Houston, Texas
1	Greg Tucker	Guard	6–2	175	Junior	Chicago, Illinois
2	Jamere Dismukes	Guard	6–1	175	Junior	Park Forest, Illinois
5	Arthur Gage	Center	6–10	225	Junior	Plainfield, Illinois
10	Mashawn Chamberlain	Forward	6–4	210	Junior	Chicago, Illinois
14	Nate Henry	Guard	6–2	175	Junior	Chicago, Illinois
23	Aaron Williams	Forward	6–6	215	Junior	Chicago, Illinois
31	Jeremy Robinson	Forward	6–9	225	Senior	Decatur, Illinois
32	Nate Duhon	Guard	6–3	197	Junior	Lansing, Michigan
33	Quinton Pippen	Guard/Forward	6–4	205	Junior	Hamburg, Arkansas
34	Quincy Ukaigwe	Center	6–9	201	Senior	Matteson, Illinois
35	Clarke Rosenberg	Guard	6–3	170	Sophomore	Skokie, Illinois
42	Matt Ross	Forward	6–8	220	Junior	Dixon, Illinois
45	Willie Rosenthal	Center	6–11	220	Freshman	Rolling Meadows, Illinois
54	Marcus Starks	Forward	6–5	210	Junior	Calumet City, Illinois

== Schedule and results ==
Date time, TV	Opponent	Result	Record	Site (attendance) city, state
Regular season
11/10/2012*; 1:00 pm	at Green Bay	L 67–72	0–1	Resch Center (2,249); Green Bay, WI
11/13/2012*; 7:05 pm	Concordia University Chicago	W 81–65	1–1	Emil and Patricia Jones Convocation Center (743); Chicago, IL
11/16/2011*; 6:00 pm	at Kent State; Joe Cipriano Nebraska Classic	L 63–92	1–2	M.A.C. Center (2,380); Kent, OH
11/18/2012*; 1:00 pm	at Tulane; Joe Cipriano Nebraska Classic	L 51–79	1–3	Avron B. Fogelman Arena (1,749); New Orleans, LA
11/23/2012*; 7:05 pm	at Valparaiso; Joe Cipriano Nebraska Classic	L 46–67	1–4	Athletics–Recreation Center (2,477); Valparaiso, IN
11/24/2012*; 4:30 pm	vs. Nebraska-Omaha; Joe Cipriano Nebraska Classic	L 66–68	1–5	Athletics–Recreation Center (2,088); Valparaiso, IN
11/26/2012*; 6:00 pm, ESPNU	at Notre Dame	L 65–92	1–6	Purcell Pavilion (7,523); South Bend, IN
11/29/2012*; 7:05 pm	Trinity Christian	W 87–61	2–6	Emil and Patricia Jones Convocation Center (440); Chicago, IL
12/01/2012*; 2:00 pm	at SIU Edwardsville	L 57–71	2–7	Vadalabene Center (1,502); Edwardsville, IL
12/05/2012*; 7:05 pm, Lakeshore PTV/ESPN3	DePaul	L 64–74	2–8	Emil and Patricia Jones Convocation Center (2,691); Chicago, IL
12/08/2012*; 2:05 pm	Alabama State	W 67–54	3–8	Emil and Patricia Jones Convocation Center (379); Chicago, IL
12/16/2012*; 6:00 pm, Pac-12 Network	at Oregon State	L 77–87	3–9	Gill Coliseum (4,183); Corvallis, OR
12/19/2012*; 7:00 pm	at Rice	L 60–63 ^{OT}	3–10	Tudor Fieldhouse (1,077); Houston, TX
12/22/2012*; 3:00 pm	at Houston	L 57–79	3–11	Hofheinz Pavilion (3,113); Houston, TX
12/29/2012*; 3:30 pm, BTN	at No. 10 Ohio State	L 44–87	3–12	Value City Arena (16,881); Columbus, OH
12/31/2012*; 12:00 pm	at Toledo	W 58–53	4–12	Savage Arena (3,606); Toledo, OH
01/03/2013*; 9:00 pm	at UNLV	L 52–74	4–13	Thomas & Mack Center (14,122); Paradise, NV
01/12/2013; 3:20 pm	at NJIT	L 78–83 ^{3OT}	4–14 (0–1)	Fleisher Center (277); Newark, NJ
01/14/2013*; 7:00 pm, CSU-TV	Benedictine-Springfield	W 77–53	5–14	Emil and Patricia Jones Convocation Center (412); Chicago, IL
01/19/2013; 5:00 pm, CSU-TV	Houston Baptist	W 81–56	6–14 (1–1)	Emil and Patricia Jones Convocation Center (389); Chicago, IL
01/20/2013*; 7:05 pm, Lakeshore PTV/CSU-TV/ESPN3	Loyola–Chicago	L 63–66 ^{OT}	6–15	Emil and Patricia Jones Convocation Center (1,159); Chicago, IL
01/26/2013; 3:30 pm, CSU-TV	Utah Valley	W 62–54	7–15 (2–1)	Emil and Patricia Jones Convocation Center (316); Chicago, IL
02/02/2013; 7:00 pm, Broncs Live	at Texas–Pan American	L 65–68	7–16 (2–2)	UTPA Fieldhouse (615); Edinburg, TX
02/09/2013; 5:00 pm, CSU-TV	NJIT	L 58–63	7–17 (2–3)	Emil and Patricia Jones Convocation Center (418); Chicago, IL
02/16/2013*; 2:05 pm, CSU-TV	Urbana	W 82–74	8–17	Emil and Patricia Jones Convocation Center (373); Chicago, IL
02/19/2013*; 7:00 pm	at Nebraska–Omaha	L 75–79	8–18	Ralston Arena (820); Ralston, NE
02/23/2013; 7:30 pm, CSU-TV	Texas–Pan American	L 51–55	8–19 (2–4)	Emil and Patricia Jones Convocation Center (1,278); Chicago, IL
02/26/2013*; 7:05 pm, Lakeshore PTV/ CSU-TV/ESPN3	Eastern Illinois	L 50–58	8–20	Emil and Patricia Jones Convocation Center (480); Chicago, IL
03/02/2013; 8:05 pm, UVU-TV	at Utah Valley	L 69–76	8–21 (2–5)	UCCU Center (3,138); Orem, UT
03/09/2013; 7:05 pm, Legacy Sports Network	at Houston Baptist	W 71–58	9–21 (3–5)	Sharp Gymnasium (580); Houston, TX
2013 Great West Conference men's basketball tournament
03/15/2013; 7:30 pm, CSU-TV	Texas–Pan American; Semifinals	W 63–55	10–21	Emil and Patricia Jones Convocation Center (1,271); Chicago, IL
03/16/2013; 7:30 pm, Lakeshore PTV/ CSU-TV/ ESPN3	Houston Baptist; Championship Game	W 75–60	11–21	Emil and Patricia Jones Convocation Center (1,004); Chicago, IL
2013 CIT
03/20/2013*; 7:00 pm	at UIC; First Round	L 69–80	11–22	UIC Pavilion (2,417); Chicago, IL
*Non-conference game. ^{#}Rankings from AP Poll. (#) Tournament seedings in parentheses. All times are in Central.
