= 2012–13 Houston Baptist Huskies men's basketball team =

American college basketball season

2012–13 Houston Baptist Huskies men's basketball
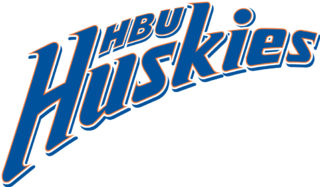
- Conference: Great West Conference
- Record: 14–17 (3–5 Great West)
- Head coach: Ron Cottrell (22nd season)
- Assistant coaches: Steven Key; Justin Kinne; Jeremy Case
- Home arena: Sharp Gymnasium

2012–13 Great West Conference men's basketball standings
	Conf.				Overall
Team	W		L	PCT	W		L	PCT
NJIT	6	–	2	.750	16	–	13	.552
Texas–Pan American	5	–	3	.625	16	–	16	.500
Chicago State †	3	–	5	.375	11	–	22	.333
Houston Baptist	3	–	5	.375	14	–	17	.452
Utah Valley	3	–	5	.375	14	–	18	.438
† 2013 Great West tournament winner As of March 20, 2013; Rankings from AP Poll

The 2012–13 Houston Baptist Huskies men's basketball team represented Houston Baptist University in the 2012–13 college basketball season. This was head coach Ron Cottrell's twenty-second season at HBU. The Huskies played their home games at the Sharp Gymnasium and were members of the Great West Conference. They finished the season 14–17, 3–5 in Great West play to finish in a three way tie for third place. They advanced to the championship game of the Great West tournament where they lost to Chicago State.

This was the Huskies final season as members of the Great West, as Houston Baptist will join the Southland Conference for the 2013 season.

== Media ==
All Houston Baptist games will be broadcast on the radio and online live by Legacy Sports Network (LSN). LSN will also provide online video for every Huskies home game.

== Roster ==
2012–13 Houston Baptist Huskies men's basketball team
Players
Coaches

Pos.	#	Name	Height	Weight	Year	Previous school	Hometown
G	2	Marcel Smith	5 ft 6 in (1.68 m)	150 lb (68 kg)	So	Academy for Business and Technology in Melvindale	Detroit, MI
G	3	Tyler Russell	6 ft 0 in (1.83 m)	180 lb (82 kg)	So	Millennium	Goodyear, AZ
F	4	Art Bernardi	6 ft 9 in (2.06 m)	225 lb (102 kg)	Sr	Colegio Avanco; New Mexico JC	Caxias do Sul, Brazil
G	5	James Harper	6 ft 4 in (1.93 m)	185 lb (84 kg)	Fr	Brophy Prep	Phoenix, AZ
F	10	Lamar Thomas	6 ft 9 in (2.06 m)	235 lb (107 kg)	Sr	Solebury Prep; Fordham	Littleton, CO
G	11	Anthony Hill	6 ft 0 in (1.83 m)	175 lb (79 kg)	Sr	Plano East; Colgate	Plano, TX
G	12	Rob Lewis	5 ft 11 in (1.8 m)	180 lb (82 kg)	Fr	Clear Lake	Clear Lake, TX
G	14	Aaron Asp	5 ft 10 in (1.78 m)	180 lb (82 kg)	Jr	CHSA	Houston, TX
G/F	22	Dauson Womack	6 ft 6 in (1.98 m)	205 lb (93 kg)	Fr	North Cobb Christian; South Mountain CC	Milwaukee, WI
G	23	Dewayne Bowden	5 ft 11 in (1.8 m)	165 lb (75 kg)	So	Aldine	Houston, TX
F	32	Marcus Davis	6 ft 5 in (1.96 m)	190 lb (86 kg)	Jr	La Joya; South Mountain CC	Glendale, AZ
C	33	Spencer Gales	6 ft 8 in (2.03 m)	190 lb (86 kg)	Fr	Northwest	Wichita, KS
G/F	34	Caleb Crayton	6 ft 3 in (1.91 m)	205 lb (93 kg)	Fr	Northeast Academy	Oklahoma City, OK
G	35	Jonathan Evans	5 ft 10 in (1.78 m)	170 lb (77 kg)	Jr	Bellaire	Houston, TX
F	42	Cody Joyce	6 ft 8 in (2.03 m)	220 lb (100 kg)	Fr	Southern	Churchton, MD

Head coach

- Ron Cottrell (Arkansas)

Assistant coach(es)

- Steven Key (Houston Baptist)
- Justin 'Jud' Kinne (Albion)
- Jeremy Case (Kansas)

Legend

- (C) Team captain
- (S) Suspended
- (I) Ineligible
- (W) Walk-on
- Injured
- Current redshirt

== Schedule and results ==
Date time, TV	Rank^{#}	Opponent^{#}	Result	Record	High points	High rebounds	High assists	Site (attendance) city, state
Exhibition
11/03/2012*; 7:05 pm, LSN		Hillsdale College; Homecoming	W 108–47	0–0	16 – Russell	11 – Bernardi	6 – Smith	Sharp Gymnasium (N/A); Houston, TX
Regular Season
11/09/2012*; 8:30 pm		vs. Arkansas-Pine Bluff; Rainbow Classic	W 72–68	1–0	22 – Davis	7 – Crayton	2 – Bernardi, Hill, Russell	Stan Sheriff Center (5,674); Honolulu, HI
11/11/2012*; 6:30 pm		vs. Maryland–Eastern Shore; Rainbow Classic	W 70–55	2–0	22 – Bernardi	7 – Bernardi	4 – Smith, Russell, Davis	Stan Sheriff Center (5,339); Honolulu, HI
11/13/2012*; 3:00 am, ESPN		at Hawaiʻi; Rainbow Classic	L 60–73	2–1	22 – Bernardi	8 – Bernardi	5 – Evans	Stan Sheriff Center (5,388); Honolulu, HI
11/17/2012*; 7:05 pm, LSN		Dallas Christian	W 82–73	3–1	21 – Bernardi	7 – Bernardi	5 – Russell	Sharp Gymnasium (634); Houston, TX
11/20/2012*; 7:05 pm, LSN		Pepperdine	L 53–57 ^{OT}	3–2	14 – Russell & Bernardi	15 – Womack	3 – Bernardi & Davis	Sharp Gymnasium (815); Houston, TX
11/24/2012*; 2:00 pm, OVC Digital Network		at Eastern Illinois	L 44–64	3–3	11 – Russell	7 – Davis	3 – Smith, Lewis	Lantz Arena (226); Charleston, IL
12/01/2012*; 7:05 pm, Owl Vision		at Rice	L 53–61	3–4	15 – Bernardi, Russell	14 – Bernardi	3 – Russell	Tudor Fieldhouse (1,827); Houston, TX
12/08/2012*; 7:05 pm, LSN		Sam Houston State	L 57–69	3–5	17 – Bernardi	8 – Davis	3 – Russell	Sharp Gymnasium (691); Houston, TX
12/13/2012*; 7:00 pm		at UT–Arlington	L 47–81	3–6	8 – Harper	5 – Crayton, Davis	4 – Smith	UT Arlington College Park Center (1,259); Arlington, TX
12/18/2012*; 7:05 pm, LSN		Arlington Baptist	W 100–61	4–6	19 – Womack	10 – Womack	7 – Lewis	Sharp Gymnasium (235); Houston, TX
12/22/2012*; 2:00 pm, Pac-12 Network		at Oregon	L 50–91	4–7	14 – Bernardi	9 – Gales	3 – Lewis	Matthew Knight Arena (5,284); Egene, OR
12/28/2012*; 7:00 pm, CST		at LSU	L 58–75	4–8	15 – Russell	8 – Womack, Crayton	4 – Russell	Pete Maravich Assembly Center (7,032); Baton Rouge, LA
12/31/2012*; 2:05 pm, LSN		Army	L 86–95	4–9	24 – Russell	9 – Bernardi	5 – Russell	Sharp Gymnasium (824); Houston, TX
01/03/2013*; 5:30 pm, FSSW		at Texas A&M	L 59–67	4–10	13 – Crayton	8 – Womack	7 – Smith	Reed Arena (5,463); College Station, TX
01/08/2013; 7:05 pm, LSN		UT-Pan American	L 60–70	4–11 (0–1)	14 – Smith	6 – Bernardi	2 – Smith, Hill	Sharp Gymnasium (617); Houston, TX
01/12/2013; 8:05 pm, UVU-TV		at Utah Valley	L 62–83	4–12 (0–2)	17 – Bernardi	5 – Bernardi	4 – Hill	UCCU Center (3,320); Orem, UT
01/14/2013*; 8:00 pm, Miner TV		at UTEP	L 44–72	4–13	14 – Crayton	6 – Bernardi, Crayton	3 – Hill, Lewis	Don Haskins Center (6,608); El Paso, TX
01/19/2013; 5:00 pm, CSU-TV		at Chicago State	L 56–81	4–14 (0–3)	21 – Bernardi	13 – Bernardi	2 – Lewis	Emil and Patricia Jones Convocation Center (389); Chicago, IL
01/22/2013*; 7:05 pm, KSMO		at UMKC	W 63–61	5–14	25 – Bernardi	8 – Bernardi	2 – Bernardi, Crayton, Womack	Swinney Recreation Center (1,122); Kansas City, MO
01/26/2013*; 7:05 pm, LSN		Ecclesia	W 94–40	6–14	20 – Bernardi	11 – Bernardi	5 – Smith, Lewis	Sharp Gymnasium (670); Houston, TX
02/02/2013; 2:05 pm, LSN		NJIT	W 66–57	7–14 (1–3)	22 – Bernardi	12 – Bernardi	4 – Smith	Sharp Gymnasium (528); Houston, TX
02/06/2013*; 7:05 pm, LSN		UMKC	W 66–45	8–14	15 – Bernardi	10 – Bernardi	6 – Smith	Sharp Gymnasium (591); Houston, TX
02/09/2013*; 12:00 pm, Privateers Showcase		at New Orleans	W 75–68 ^{OT}	9–14	23 – Bernardi	11 – Crayton	5 – Hill, Crayton	Lakefront Arena (489); New Orleans, LA
02/16/2013; 7:00 pm, Broncs Live		at UT-Pan American	W 53–48	10–14 (2–3)	12 – Hill, Lewis	11 – Womack	2 – Bernardi, Crayton	UTPA Fieldhouse (2,101); Edinburg, TX
02/23/2013; 7:05 pm, LSN		Utah Valley	W 73–63	11–14 (3–3)	23 – Crayton	8 – Bernardi	2 – Smith, Hill, Crayton	Sharp Gymnasium (520); Houston, TX
02/25/2013*; 7:05 pm, LSN		New Orleans	W 65–52	12–14	15 – Womack	12 – Womack	3 – Hill, Smith	Sharp Gymnasium (581); Houston, TX
03/02/2013; 3:00 pm, Highlanders All Access		at NJIT	L 58–69	12–15 (3–4)	16 – Lewis	11 – Bernardi	3 – Smith	Fleisher Center (1,500); Newark, NJ
03/09/2013; 7:05 pm, LSN		Chicago State	L 58–71	12–16 (3–5)	14 – Bernardi, Lewis	10 – Bernardi	3 – Lewis	Sharp Gymnasium (580); Houston, TX
Great West tournament
03/14/2013; 5:00 pm, CSU-TV	(4)	vs. (5) Utah Valley; First Round	W 76–74 ^{2OT}	13–16	24 – Lewis	12 – Bernardi	2 – Smith, Womack	Emil and Patricia Jones Convocation Center (N/A); Chicago, IL
03/15/2013; 5:00 pm, CSU-TV	(4)	vs. (1) NJIT; Semifinals	W 62–61	14–16	18 – Bernardi	8 – Bernardi	4 – Bernardi	Emil and Patricia Jones Convocation Center (1,271); Chicago, IL
03/16/2013; 7:30 pm, CSU-TV/Lakeshore PTV/ESPN3	(4)	at (3) Chicago State; Championship Game	L 60–75	14–17	17 – Bernardi	5 – Bowden	2 – Smith	Emil and Patricia Jones Convocation Center (1,004); Chicago, IL
*Non-conference game. ^{#}Rankings from AP Poll. (#) Tournament seedings in parentheses. All times are in Central.
