= Jerome Beasley =

American basketball player (born 1980)

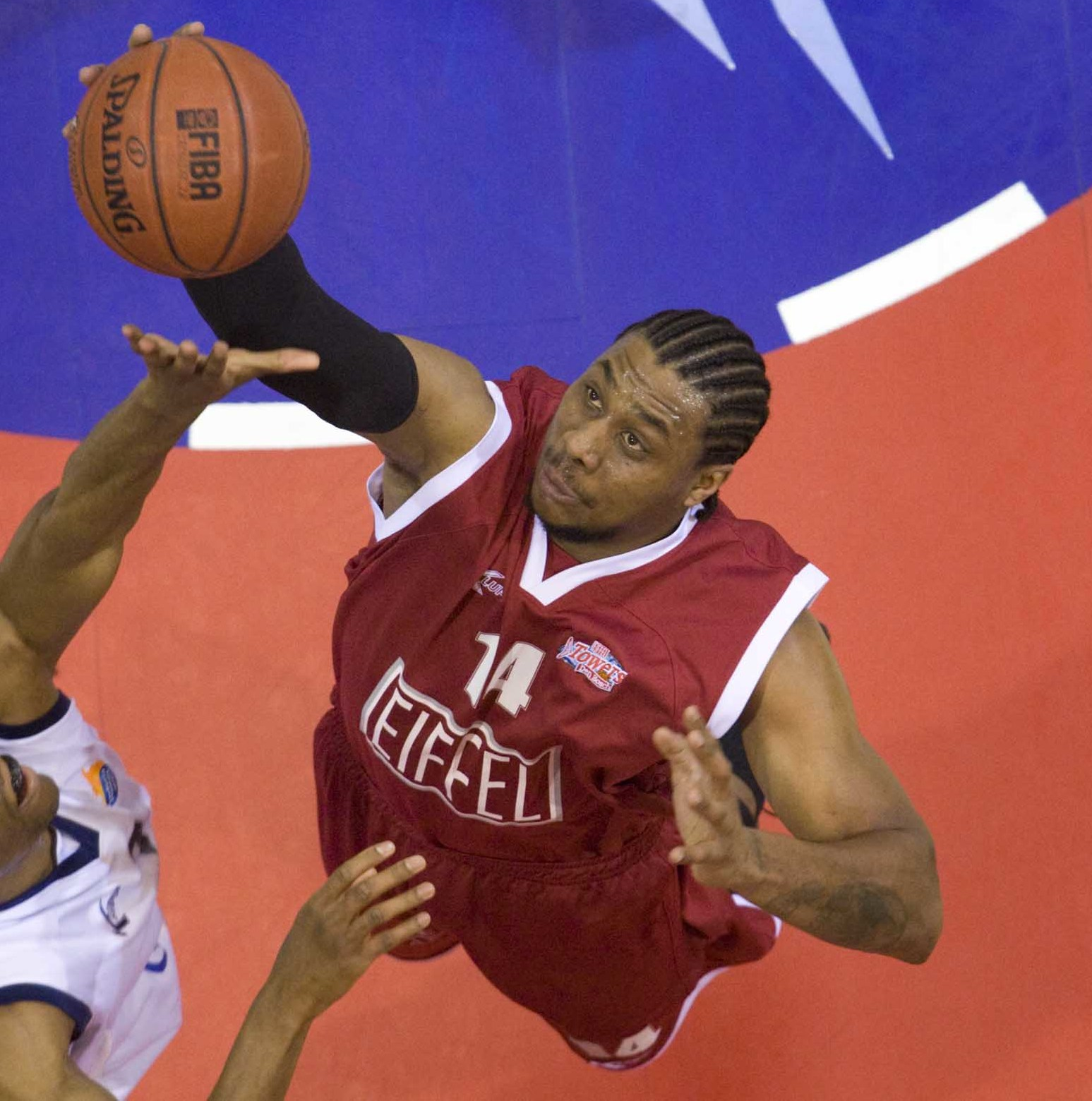
- Beasley playing with EiffelTowers in 2010

Personal information
- Born: May 17, 1980 (age 46) Compton, California
- Listed height: 6 ft 10 in (2.08 m)
- Listed weight: 240 lb (109 kg)

Career information
- High school: Moreno Valley (Moreno Valley, California)
- College: Midland (1999–2001); North Dakota (2001–2003)
- NBA draft: 2003: 2nd round, 33rd overall pick
- Drafted by: Miami Heat
- Playing career: 2003–2012
- Position: Center / power forward
- Number: 14, 24

Career history
- 2003–2005: Miami Heat
- 2004: Sioux Falls Skyforce
- 2005: Ülkerspor
- 2005–2006: Granada
- 2006: Polpak Świecie
- 2006: Dakota Wizards
- 2007: Sydney Kings
- 2007: Trotamundos de Carabobo
- 2007: Reales de La Vega
- 2007–2008: Ironi Ramat Gan
- 2008–2010: EiffelTowers Den Bosch
- 2010–2011: Dnipro
- 2011–2012: APOEL

Career highlights
- Dutch Cup champion (2009); CBA champion (2005); NBA D-League champion (2007); 2× NCC Player of the Year (2002, 2003); 2× First-team All-NCC (2002, 2003)
- Stats at NBA.com
- Stats at Basketball Reference

Jerome Beasley (born May 17, 1980) is an American former professional basketball player. Standing at 6 ft 10 in, he played the center and power forward positions.

== High school career ==
Beasley graduated from Moreno Valley High School in California in 1999. In his senior year, he led Moreno Valley to a 25–6 record and averaged 19 points, 15 rebounds, and 4 assists per game.

== College career ==
From 1999 to 2001, Beasley played at Midland College, a junior college in Texas, then transferred to the University of North Dakota. As a senior Beasley averaged 26.6 points and 8.9 rebounds per game, while shooting 51.3% from the field, and with a 73.6% free throw accuracy.

== Professional career ==
Drafted by the NBA's Miami Heat in the second round of the 2003 NBA draft, he played only two games for them before being cut. These two games with Miami ended up being Beasley's only time in the NBA, as his final game ever was also his 2nd game on November 16, 2003. That day, Miami would lose to the Los Angeles Lakers 77 - 99, with Beasley recording 1 rebound and only 2 and half minutes of playing time. In his 2 NBA games, Beasley had career totals of 2 points, 1 rebound, and 5 minutes of playing time.

He also played for the CBA's Sioux Falls Skyforce and the NBA D-League's Dakota Wizards for nine games before buying out his own contract.

Beasley played for the Sydney Kings of Australia's NBL during the 2006–07 season, but he was released following the team's exit from the playoffs. In October 2007, he moved to Israel and signed with Ironi Ramat Gan. Beasley joined the EiffelTowers Den Bosch of the Netherlands for the 2008–2009 season, but he was released in January 2009, after testing positive for Carboxy-THC, the active ingredient of marijuana. He was then resigned to a one-year contract by the EiffelTowers for the 2009/2010 season in hope that he would be their starting center for the season, and won the 2009 Dutch Basketball Cup with them.

In the 2010/2011 season he signed with BC Dnipro from the top division in Ukraine. In June 2011 he moved to APOEL in Cyprus for the 2011/2012 season and then quit his professional career.

== Legal problems ==
In 2010, Beasley was arrested for falling behind on child support payments.

== American National Team ==
Beasley took part in the preliminary matches of the 2006 FIBA World Championship, playing ten games for Team USA.
