= Brian Jones (basketball, born 1971) =

American college basketball coach (born 1971)

Current position
- Title: Assistant coach
- Team: Bradley
- Conference: MVC

Biographical details
- Born: April 22, 1971 (age 55); Rock Island, Illinois, U.S.

Playing career
- 1990–1994: Northern Iowa
- Position: Forward/guard

Coaching career (HC unless noted)
- 1994–1996: Alleman Catholic HS (assistant)
- 1996–1998: Nebraska–Omaha (assistant)
- 1998–1999: Southwest Missouri State (admin. asst.)
- 1999–2006: Iowa (assistant)
- 2006–2019: North Dakota
- 2019–2022: Illinois State (assistant)
- 2022: Illinois State (interim head coach)
- 2022–2023: Bradley (assistant)
- 2023–2025: East Tennessee State (assistant)
- 2025–present: Bradley (assistant)

Head coaching record
- Overall: 192–222 (.464)
- Tournaments: 0–1 (NCAA Division I); 0–5 (CIT)

Accomplishments and honors

Championships
- 2 Great West tournament (2011, 2012); Big Sky regular season (2017); Big Sky tournament (2017)

Awards
- Big Sky Coach of the Year (2017)

Brian Daniel Jones (born April 22, 1971) is an American college basketball coach. Jones is a graduate of University of Northern Iowa. From 2006 to 2019, Jones was head coach at North Dakota, with an overall record of 190–217. He is currently an assistant coach at Bradley.

== Early life and college playing career ==
Jones was born in Rock Island, Illinois. At Rock Island High School, Jones earned two all-state honors in basketball and graduated in 1990.

From 1990 to 1994, Jones attended the University of Northern Iowa, playing four seasons at forward and guard under head coach Eldon Miller. For the Northern Iowa Panthers, Jones played 104 games with 22 starts, averaging 3.7 points and 2.9 rebounds. Jones graduated from Northern Iowa in 1994 with a bachelor's degree in communications and broadcasting.

== Coaching career ==
=== Early coaching career (1994–2006) ===
In the spring of 1994, Jones signed a professional contract to play basketball in Australia.

Returning to Rock Island, Jones was an assistant coach at Alleman Catholic High School from 1994 to 1996. Then from 1996 to 1998, Jones was an assistant coach at Nebraska–Omaha while attending graduate school there.

In 1998, Jones began the first of several positions under head coach Steve Alford as administrative assistant for Southwest Missouri State. Jones then followed Alford to Iowa for the same position in 1999. In July 2001, Alford promoted Jones to assistant coach. Jones would remain as assistant through 2006, during which Iowa had the Big Ten Conference's leading rebounder for four seasons and three straight seasons with the conference's best shot blocker.

Jones completed his master's degree in athletics administration at the University of Nebraska Omaha in 2003.

=== North Dakota (2006–2019) ===
The University of North Dakota hired Jones as the eighteenth North Dakota Fighting Sioux (later Fighting Hawks) men's basketball head coach on May 19, 2006. Jones was an early applicant among nearly fifty.

During Jones' tenure, he oversaw the men's basketball program's transition from NCAA Division II (D-II) to NCAA Division I (D-I). The university won back-to-back Great West tournament championships in 2011 and 2012, and he led North Dakota to five overall (four consecutive) appearances in the CollegeInsider.com Postseason Tournament. In 2017, he led them to the NCAA Division I Tournament for the first time.

After thirteen seasons, Jones resigned from North Dakota on May 1, 2019, to become associate head coach at Illinois State.

=== Later coaching career (2019–present) ===
Having been associate head coach since 2019, Jones became interim head coach at Illinois State on February 14, 2022, through the end of the season following Dan Muller's resignation. After the season, Jones became assistant coach at Bradley under head coach Brian Wardle, helping the 2022–23 Bradley Braves win the first Missouri Valley Conference regular season title since 1996 and qualify for the 2023 National Invitation Tournament.

On May 3, 2023, Jones became assistant coach at East Tennessee State under head coach Brooks Savage.

Jones returned to Bradley as assistant coach on May 1, 2025, reuniting with Wardle.

== Head coaching record ==
Record table
Season	Team	Overall	Conference	Standing	Postseason
North Dakota Fighting Sioux (North Central Conference) (2006–2008)
2006–07	North Dakota	11–17	3–10	T–5th	
2007–08	North Dakota	15–15	2–10	T–6th	
North Dakota:		26–32 (.448)	5–20 (.200)		
North Dakota Fighting Sioux / North Dakota (Great West Conference) (2008–2012)
2008–09	North Dakota	16–12	5–7	4th	
2009–10	North Dakota	8–23	5–7	T–3rd	
2010–11	North Dakota	19–15	8–4	3rd	CIT First Round
2011–12	North Dakota	17–15	6–4	2nd	CIT First Round
North Dakota:		60–65 (.480)	24–22 (.522)		
North Dakota / North Dakota Fighting Hawks (Big Sky Conference) (2012–2018)
2012–13	North Dakota	16–17	12–8	3rd	CIT First Round
2013–14	North Dakota	17–17	12–8	T–2nd	CIT First Round
2014–15	North Dakota	8–22	4–14	T–10th	
2015–16	North Dakota	17–16	10–8	T–5th	CIT First Round
2016–17	North Dakota	22–10	14–4	1st	NCAA Division I First Round
2017–18	North Dakota	12–20	6–12	T–8th	
North Dakota:		92–102 (.474)	58–54 (.518)		
North Dakota Fighting Hawks (The Summit League) (2018–2019)
2018–19	North Dakota	12–18	6–10	7th	
North Dakota:		12–18 (.400)	6–10 (.375)		
Illinois State Redbirds (Missouri Valley Conference) (2022)
2021–22 *	Illinois State	2–5 (.286)	1–4 (.200)		
Illinois State:		2–5 (.286)	1–4 (.200)		
Total:		192–222 (.464)	94–110 (.461)		
National champion Postseason invitational champion Conference regular season champion Conference regular season and conference tournament champion Division regular season champion Division regular season and conference tournament champion Conference tournament champion

* Interim coach
