= North Dakota Fighting Hawks men's basketball =

2026–27 North Dakota Fighting Hawks men's basketball team
- University: University of North Dakota
- First season: 1904-1905
- Head coach: Paul Sather (7th season)
- Location: Grand Forks, North Dakota
- Arena: Betty Engelstad Sioux Center (capacity: 3,300)
- Conference: Summit League
- Nickname: Fighting Hawks
- Colors: Kelly green and white
- All-time record: 371–332 (.528)

NCAA Division I tournament Final Four
- NCAA Division II; 1965, 1966, 1990
Other NCAA Division I tournament results
Elite Eight	NCAA Division II; 1965, 1966, 1975, 1976, 1977, 1982, 1990, 1991
Sweet Sixteen	NCAA Division II; 1965, 1966, 1975, 1976, 1977, 1982, 1990, 1991, 1993
Appearances	NCAA Division I 2017; NCAA Division II; 1965, 1966, 1967, 1974, 1975, 1976, 1977, 1979, 1980, 1981, 1982, 1990, 1991, 1992, 1993, 1994, 1995, 2000, 2003

NAIA tournament appearances
- 1949, 1953, 1954

Conference tournament champions
- 1992, 1993, 1994, 2011, 2012, 2017

Conference regular-season champions
- 1928, 1934, 1935, 1936, 1937, 1954, 1955, 1965, 1966, 1967, 1974, 1975, 1976, 1977, 1982, 1990, 1991, 1995, 2017

Uniforms
Home	Away	Alternate

The North Dakota Fighting Hawks men's basketball team represents the University of North Dakota NCAA Division I men's basketball. The Fighting Hawks are members of the Summit League. Prior to membership in the Summit, they were members of Division II's North Central Conference and Division I's Great West Conference and Big Sky Conference. The current head coach is Paul Sather. The Fighting Hawks made their only appearance in the NCAA Division I men's basketball tournament in 2017.

On July 1, 2018, the school officially joined the Summit League in all sports except for football, in which it remained a Big Sky member before joining the Missouri Valley Football Conference in 2020.

The team was known as the Flickertails until 1929, when it was renamed the Fighting Sioux. It dropped that name in 2011 and went without a nickname until 2015, when it became the Fighting Hawks.

== History ==
The North Dakota Men's basketball team is the fourth winningest program in the history of NCAA's Division II basketball.

== Championships ==
North Dakota has a total of 19 regular-season championships and six conference tournament championships.

North Central Conference

Championship	Years
Regular season (18)	1928, 1934, 1935, 1936, 1937, 1954, 1955, 1965, 1966, 1967, 1974, 1975, 1976, 1977, 1982, 1990, 1991, 1995
Conference tournament (3)	1992, 1993, 1994

Great West Conference

Championship	Years
Conference tournament (2)	2011, 2012

Big Sky Conference

Championship	Years
Regular season (1)	2017
Conference tournament (1)	2017

NCAA Division II tournament appearances

Round	Years
Elite Eight (8)	1965, 1966, 1975, 1976, 1977, 1982, 1990, 1991
Final Four (3)	1965, 1966, 1990

== Postseason ==
=== NCAA Division I tournament results ===
North Dakota has appeared in one NCAA Division I tournament. Their record is 0–1.

Year	Seed	Round	Opponent	Result
2017	#15	First round	Arizona	L 82–100

=== Summit League tournament results ===
North Dakota has appeared in seven Summit League tournaments. Their combined record is 6–7.

Year	Seed	Round	Opponent	Result
2019	7	Quarterfinals	Omaha	L 76–81
2020	6	Quarterfinals; Semifinals; Championship	South Dakota; Purdue Fort Wayne; North Dakota State	W 74–71; W 73–56; L 53–89
2021	5	Quarterfinals	Oral Roberts	L 65–76
2023	9	First Round; Quarterfinals	Denver; Oral Roberts	W 83–68; L 80–96
2024	3	Quarterfinals	Omaha	L 72–73
2025	6	Quarterfinals; Semifinals	South Dakota State; St. Thomas	W 85–69; L 69–85
2026	3	Quarterfinals; Semifinals; Championship	Denver; St. Thomas; North Dakota State	W 83–67; W 67–66; L 62–70

=== Big Sky tournament results ===
North Dakota has appeared in the Big Sky Conference men's basketball tournament 5 times. Their combined record is 9–4.

Tournament Champions

Year	Seed	Round	Opponent	Result
2013	3	Quarterfinals; Semifinals	Southern Utah; Weber State	W 69–52; L 74–76
2014	2	Quarterfinals; Semifinals; Championship	Sacramento State; Portland State; Weber State	W 79–76; W 79–63; L 67–88
2016	5	First Round; Quarterfinals; Semifinals	Southern Utah; Idaho State; Weber State	W 85–80; W 83–49; L 78–83 OT
2017	1	Quarterfinals; Semifinals; Championship	Portland State; Idaho; Weber State	W 95–72; W 69–64; W 93–89 OT
2018	8	First Round; Quarterfinals	Montana State; Montana	W 76–74; L 76–84

=== Great West tournament results ===
North Dakota appeared in the Great West Conference men's basketball tournament 3 times. Their combined record is 5–1.

Tournament Champions

Year	Seed	Round	Opponent	Result
2010	3	Quarterfinals	NJIT	L 57–70
2011	3	Quarterfinals; Semifinals; Championship	Texas–Pan American; Houston Baptist; South Dakota	W 71–70; W 65–63; W 77–76 2OT
2012	2	Semfinals; Championship	Texas–Pan American; NJIT	W 63–59; W 75–60

=== NCAA Division II tournament results ===
North Dakota has appeared in the NCAA Division II tournament 19 times. Their combined record is 29–22.

Year	Round	Opponent	Result
1965	Regional semifinals Regional Finals; Elite Eight; Final Four; National 3rd-place game	Minnesota–Duluth; Minnesota State–Moorhead; Seattle Pacific; Southern Illinois; Saint Michael's	W 67–57; W 82–57; W 97–83; L 64–97; W 94–86
1966	Regional semifinals Regional Finals; Elite Eight; Final Four; National 3rd-place game	Northern Colorado; Valparaiso; Abilene Christian; Southern Illinois; Akron	W 84–71; W 112–82; W 63–62; L 61–69; L 71–76
1967	Regional semifinals Regional 3rd-place game	Louisiana Tech; Parsons	L 77–86; W 107–56
1974	Regional Quarterfinals; Regional semifinals Regional 3rd-place game	Monmouth (IL); Southwest Missouri State; Saint Cloud State	W 73–67; L 63–71; W 75–71
1975	Regional semifinals Regional Finals; Elite Eight	Missouri–Rolla; Nebraska–Omaha; Old Dominion	W 72–61; W 84–71; L 62–78
1976	Regional semifinals Regional Finals; Elite Eight	Nebraska–Omaha; Green Bay; Puget Sound	W 86–74 OT; W 65–61; L 77–80
1977	Regional semifinals Regional Finals; Elite Eight	Augustana (SD); Green Bay; Chattanooga	W 71–64; W 45–43; L 52–76
1979	Regional semifinals Regional 3rd-place game	Green Bay; Nebraska–Omaha	L 48–63; L 75–86
1980	Regional semifinals Regional 3rd-place game	Western Illinois; Stonehill	L 79–102; L 57–70
1981	Regional semifinals Regional Finals	Central Missouri State; Green Bay	W 87–80; L 60–72
1982	Regional semifinals Regional Finals; Elite Eight	Eastern Montana; Nebraska–Omaha; Cal State Bakersfield	W 59–54; W 83–75; L 65–67
1990	Regional semifinals Regional Finals; Elite Eight; Final Four; National 3rd-place game	Alaska–Anchorage; Metro State; Jacksonville State; Kentucky Wesleyan; Morehouse	W 78–71; W 85–80; W 89–64; L 92–101; W 98–77
1991	Regional semifinals Regional Finals; Elite Eight	Kearney State; South Dakota State; Virginia Union	W 90–60; W 54–51; L 63–64
1992	Regional semifinals Regional 3rd-place game	Denver; Saint Cloud State	L 68–73; W 80–60
1993	Regional semifinals Regional Finals	Western State; South Dakota	W 80–61; L 64–66 OT
1994	Regional semifinals Regional 3rd-place game	South Dakota; Mesa State	L 76–94; W 97–88
1995	Regional Quarterfinals	Morningside	L 86–92
2000	Regional Quarterfinals; Regional semifinals	South Dakota State; Metro State	W 73–67; L 58–82
2003	Regional Quarterfinals	Saint Cloud State	L 69–74

=== NAIA tournament results ===
North Dakota has appeared in the NAIA tournament three times. Their combined record is 1–3.

Year	Round	Opponent	Result
1949	First Round; Second Round	Hawaiʻi; Texas Tech	W 70–53; L 57–62
1953	First Round	Saint Benedict's	L 66–69
1954	First Round	Saint Ambrose	L 70–77

=== CIT results ===
North Dakota has appeared in the CollegeInsider.com Postseason Tournament (CIT) five times. Their combined record is 0–5.

Year	Round	Opponent	Result
2011	First round	Air Force	L 67–77
2012	First round	Drake	L 64–70
2013	First round	Northern Iowa	L 66–77
2014	First round	Nebraska–Omaha	L 75–91
2016	First round	UC Irvine	L 86–89^{OT}

== List of head coaches ==
Number	Name	Tenure
1	George Sweetland	1904–1907
2	David Dunlap	1909–1911
3	Charles Armstrong	1912
4	Fred Archer	1913
5	Thomas Gill	1914–1917
6	Harry Caldwell	1918
7	Paul J. Davis	1919–1923
8	Edgar "Dutch" Houser	1924
9	Clement W. Letich	1925–1943
10	Jack West	1944
11	Red Jarrett	1945
12	Harold "Cookie" Cunningham	1946–1948
13	Red Jarrett	1949–1950
14	Louis D. Bogan	1951–1961
15	Bill Fitch	1962–1966
16	Jimmy Rodgers	1967–1969
17	Dave Gunther	1970–1987
18	Rich Glas	1988–2006
19	Brian Jones	2007–2019
20	Paul Sather	2019–present

== Arenas ==
- Budge Hall 1904–1905
- YMCA 1906
- Armory-Gym 1907–1918
- New Armory 1919–1950
- Hyslop Sports Center 1951–2003
- Betty Engelstad Sioux Center 2004–present

== NBA draft picks ==
North Dakota has had four of its players selected in the NBA draft.

Round	Name	Year
8	Jon Haaven	1957
2	Phil Jackson	1967
10	Chris Fahrbach	1979
2	Jerome Beasley	2003

The following players were drafted into the NBA G League

Round	Name	Year
1	Marlon Stewart	2021

== Individual awards and honors ==
=== NCC awards ===
All-NCC

- Walter Burkman (1923)
- Arthur Busdicker (1923–24)
- Edmund Boe (1926–27)
- Albert Wild (1926)
- Paul Boyd (1927 and 1929)
- Victor Brown (1927–28 and 1930)
- Alford Letch (1927–28)
- Lewis Lee (1928–29)
- Harold Eberly (1929)
- William Lowe (1930–31)
- Verne DuChene (1930)
- Curtis Schave (1931)
- Gordon Dablow (1932–33)
- Fred Felber (1932)
- Ted Meinhover (1932–34)
- Bernard Smith (1932–34)
- Ken Mullen (1934)
- Emmet Birk (1935–37)
- Weston Booth (1935)
- Herman Witasek (1935–36)
- Robert Finnegan (1936–37)
- William McCosh (1938–39)
- Don Pepke (1939)
- Bruce Stevenson (1940–42)
- Dudley Draxton (1947–48)
- Don Meredith (1949)
- Ed Weber (1949–1950)
- Fritz Engel (1950–51)
- Chuck Wolfe (1951–53)
- Jon Haaven (1953–54 and 1957)
- Don Augustin (1954–56)
- Ron Lackle (1955)
- Warner Brand (1955)
- Bob Hokanson (1958)
- Bill Monson (1959)
- Larry Exel (1960)
- Prentiss Thompson (1961)
- Curt Holt (1962–63)
- Tom Nesbitt (1964–66)
- Jim Hester (1965 and 1967)
- Paul Pederson (1966–67)
- Phil Jackson (1965–67)
- Vern Praus (1968–69)
- Al Jenkins (1969)
- Mahlon Sanders (1970–71)
- Chuck Dodge (1970 and 1972)
- Craig Skarperud (1972)
- Jim Goodrich (1974 and 1976)
- Don Gunhus (1974)
- Mark Lindahl (1975–76)
- Jim Goodrich (1976)
- Fred Lukens (1977)
- Chris Fahrbach (1977–79)
- Todd Bakken (1980)
- Aaron Harris (1981–82)
- Dan Clausen (1981–82)
- Steve Brekke (1982–83)
- Roland Jacobs (1985)
- Steve Staver (1987)
- Dave Vonesh (1988 and 1990–91)
- Mike Boschee (1989)
- Scott Guldseth (1991–93)
- Chris Gardner (1992 and 1994)
- Todd Johnson (1993–95)
- Travis Tuttle (1995–97)
- Frank Iverson (1996)
- Hunter Berg (1998 and 1999)
- Chad Mustard (2000)
- Hunter Reinke (2000)
- Kyle Behrens (2001)
- Jerome Beasley (2002–03)
- Jeff Brandt (2002)
- Evan Lindahl (2004 and 2006)
- Todd Rypkema (2004–05)
- Emmanuel Little (2007–08)

NCC MVPs

- Chuck Wolfe (1953)
- Jon Haaven (1954)
- Don Augustin (1955)
- Phil Jackson (1966–67)
- Al Jenkins (1969)
- Dan Clausen (1982)
- Dave Vonesh (1990–91)
- Scott Guldseth (1993)
- Kyle Behrens (2001)
- Jerome Beasley (2002–03)

Defensive Player of the Year

- Rico Burkett (1991)
- Frank Iverson (1996)
- Harry Boyce (2007)

Newcomer of the Year

- Broderick Powell (1992)
- Jerome Beasley (2002)

Freshman of the Year

- Jeff Brandt (2001)

NCC All-Freshman Team

- Chris Gardner (1991)
- Todd Johnson (1992)
- Travis Tuttle (1993)
- Brian Ehrp (1994)
- Dale Aue (1995)

Academic All-NCC

- Fred Lukens (1975–77)
- Doug Moe (1979–81)
- Todd Bakken (1979–81)
- Jon Sonat (1982)
- Mark Basco (1986)
- Pete Stewart (1987)
- Scott Guldseth (1992–93)
- Ben Jacobson (1993)
- Travis Tuttle (1997)
- Blaine Ristvedt (2000)
- Kyle Behrens (2001)
- Steve Bradley (2005)
- Todd Rypkema (2005)
- Josh Doyle (2006–08)
- Jimmy Hoy (2006 and 2008)
- Derek Benter (2008)
- Tyler Koenig (2008)

=== Great West awards ===
First Team All-Great West

- Travis Bledsoe (2010)

Second Team All-Great West

- Troy Huff (2011–12)
- Patrick Mitchell (2012)

All-Tournament team

- Patrick Mitchell (2011**)
- Troy Huff (2011–12)
- Jamal Webb (2012**)

* = Tournament MVP

Academic All-Great West

- Derek Benter (2009)
- Daniel Haskins (2009)
- Dustin Monsebroten (2009)

=== Big Sky awards ===
First Team All-Big Sky

- Troy Huff (2013–14)
- Quinton Hooker (2016–17)

Second Team All-Big Sky

- Aaron Anderson (2013)
- Geno Crandall (2017–18)

All-Tournament team

- Troy Huff (2013–14)
- Quinton Hooker (2016–17**)
- Corey Baldwin (2017)

** = Tournament MVP

Reserve of the Year

- Jamal Webb (2014)
- Cortez Seales (2017)

Academic All-Big Sky

- Chad Calcaterra (2014)
- Dustin Hobaugh (2015–16)
- Conner Avants (2016 and 2018)
- Dale Jones (2018)

=== Summit League awards ===
First Team All-Summit League

- Marlon Stewart (2020)
- B.J. Omot (2024)

Second Team All-Summit League

- Filip Rebrača (2021)
- Tyree Ihenacho (2024)
- Treysen Eaglestaff (2025)
- Greyson Uelmen (2026)
- Eli King (2026)

Honorable Mention All-Summit League

- Cortez Seales (2019)
- Mier Panoam (2025)

All-Defensive team

- Eli King (2024–26)

All-Newcomer team

- Amar Kuljuhovic (2024)
- Greyson Uelmen (2026)

All-Tournament team

- Marlon Stewart (2020)
- Treysen Eaglestaff (2025)
- Greyson Uelmen (2026)
- Eli King (2026)

Freshman of the Year

- Tyree Ihenacho (2021)
- Paul Bruns (2022)

Sixth Man of the Year

- Matt Norman (2023)

Defensive Player of the Year

- Eli King (2026)

== All-time statistical leaders ==
=== Single-game leaders ===
- Points: Henry (Doc) O'Keefe (56, 1908)
- Assists: Doug Moe (14, 1979)
- Rebounds: Don Augustin (32, 1955)
- Steals: Dave Vonesh (9, 1990)
- 3 point FG made: Travis Tuttle (10, 1994), Patrick Mitchell (10, 2010)
- Free Throws made: Phil Jackson (23, 1967)

=== Single-season leaders ===
- Points: Dave Vonesh (788, 1989–90)
- Assists: Rico Burkett (232, 1989–90)
- Rebounds: Dave Vonesh (410, 1989–90)
- Steals: Troy Huff (79, 2013–14)
- Blocks: Chris Gardner (93, 1991–93)
- FG made: Dave Vonesh (303, 1989–90)
- 3 point FG made: Travis Tuttle (102, 1994–95)
- Free Throws Made: Phil Jackson (208)

=== Career leaders ===
- Points: Scott Guldseth (2190, 1989–93)
- Assists: Burke Barlow (595, 1993–95)
- Rebounds: Dave Vonesh (1207, 1987–91)
- Steals: Jamal Webb (240, 2010–14)
- Blocks: Chris Gardner (313, 1990–94)
- FG made: Scott Guldseth (806, 1989–93)
- 3 point FG made: Travis Tuttle (350, 1993–97)
- Free Throws made: Dave Vonesh (507, 1987–91)
- Games Played: Brady Danielson (150, 2019–24)
