= Chicago State Cougars men's basketball =

American college basketball team

2026–27 Chicago State Cougars men's basketball team
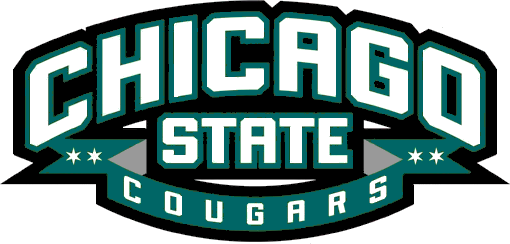
- University: Chicago State University
- Head coach: Landon Bussie (2nd season)
- Location: Chicago, Illinois
- Arena: Emil and Patricia Jones Convocation Center (capacity: 7,000)
- Conference: NEC
- Nickname: Cougars
- Colors: Green and white

Conference tournament champions
- Great West: 2013

The Chicago State Cougars men's basketball team represents Chicago State University in Chicago, Illinois, United States. The team currently competes in the Northeast Conference and is led by first-year coach Landon Bussie, who was hired on March 20, 2025. The Cougars play their home games at the Emil and Patricia Jones Convocation Center. They joined the Northeast Conference in the 2024-2025 season.

The 2012–13 Cougars won the Great West Conference tournament championship to earn an automatic bid to the CollegeInsider.com Tournament, since this conference did not have an auto-bid to the NCAA Tournament. The Cougars have never appeared in the NCAA tournament.

== Conference affiliations ==
- 1966–67 to 1976–77 – NAIA Independent
- 1977–78 to 1980–81 – Chicagoland Collegiate Athletic Conference
- 1981–82 to 1983–84 – NAIA Independent
- 1984–85 to 1992–93 – NCAA Division I Independent
- 1993–94 – East Coast Conference
- 1994–95 to 2005–06 – Mid-Continent Conference
- 2006–07 to 2008–09 – NCAA Division I Independent
- 2009–10 to 2012–13 – Great West Conference
- 2013–14 to 2021–22 – Western Athletic Conference
- 2022–23 to 2023–24 – NCAA Division I Independent
- From 2024–25 – Northeast Conference

== Postseason tournaments ==
=== NAIA Tournament results ===
The Cougars have appeared in three NAIA Tournaments. Their record is 5–3.

Year	Round	Opponent	Result
1981	First Round	Bethany Nazarene	L 63–69
1983	First Round; Second Round	Tri-State; West Virginia Wesleyan	W 76–65; L 70–87
1984	First Round; Second Round; Quarterfinals; Semifinals; 3rd Place Game	Franklin Pierce; Kearney State; Chaminade; Fort Hays State; Westmont	W 79–62; W 105–104 ^{2OT} W 68–66; L 84–86 ^{OT} W 86–82 ^{OT}

=== CIT results ===
The Cougars have appeared in one CollegeInsider.com Postseason Tournament (CIT). Their record is 0–1.

Year	Round	Opponent	Result
2013	First Round	UIC	L 69–80

=== CBI results ===
The Cougars have appeared in one College Basketball Invitational (CBI). They have a combined record of 1–1.

Year	Round	Opponent	Result
2024	First Round; Second Round	UC San Diego; Fairfield	W 77–75; L 74–77
