= Emil and Patricia Jones Convocation Center =

Multi-purpose arena in Chicago, Illinois

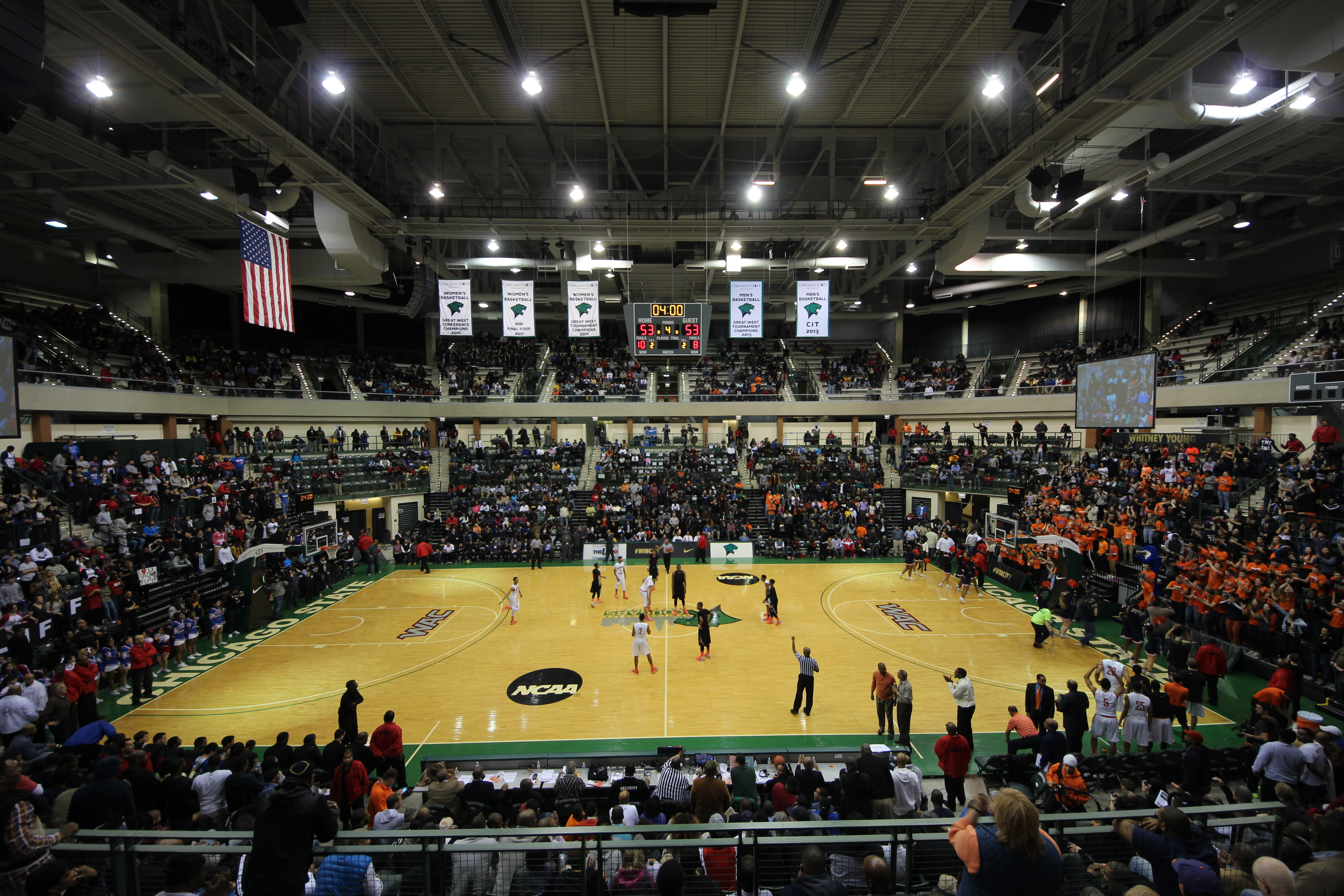
- Arena during the 2014 Chicago Public League boys' basketball championship game
- Interactive map of Emil and Patricia Jones Convocation Center
- Location: Chicago State University; 9501 South King Dr. Chicago, IL 60628 USA
- Coordinates: 41.7165°N 87.6084°W
- Owner: Chicago State University
- Operator: Chicago State University
- Capacity: 7,000

Construction
- Groundbreaking: October 4, 2002
- Opened: Fall 2007
- Cost: $38 million
- Architects: Loebl Schlossman & Hackl; Chicago, IL; William E. Brazley & Associates, Ltd. Matteson, IL

Tenants
- Chicago State Cougars men's basketball Chicago State Cougars women's basketball

The Emil and Patricia Jones Convocation Center, also known as the Jones Convocation Center or simply the JCC, is a 7,000-seat multi-purpose arena in Chicago, Illinois, United States. Completed in 2007, the arena is home court for the Chicago State University Cougars men's and women's basketball teams. The arena replaced the Dickens Athletic Center, which only had capacity to seat 2,500 persons.

The center cost nearly $38 million to build.

The venue hosted the 2012 and 2013 Great West Conference men's basketball tournaments.

== See also ==
- List of NCAA Division I basketball arenas
