= 2001–02 Valparaiso Crusaders men's basketball team =

American college basketball season

2001–02 Valparaiso Crusaders men's basketball

Mid-Con Regular season champions Mid-Con tournament champions

NCAA tournament, First Round
- Conference: Mid-Continent Conference
- Record: 25–8 (12–2 Mid-Con)
- Head coach: Homer Drew (14th season)
- Home arena: Athletics–Recreation Center

2001–02 Mid-Continent Conference men's basketball standings
	Conf.				Overall
Team	W		L	PCT	W		L	PCT
Valparaiso †	12	–	2	.857	25	–	8	.758
Oral Roberts	10	–	4	.714	17	–	14	.548
Oakland	10	–	4	.714	17	–	13	.567
Southern Utah	8	–	6	.571	11	–	16	.407
UMKC	7	–	7	.500	18	–	11	.621
IUPUI	6	–	8	.429	15	–	15	.500
Western Illinois	3	–	11	.214	12	–	16	.429
Chicago State	0	–	14	.000	2	–	26	.071
† 2002 Mid-Con Tournament winner Rankings from AP Poll

The 2001–02 Valparaiso Crusaders men's basketball team represented Valparaiso University during the 2001–02 NCAA Division I men's basketball season. The Crusaders, led by 14th-year head coach Homer Drew, played their home games at the Athletics–Recreation Center as members of the Mid-Continent Conference. Valpo finished atop the Mid-Con regular season standings, and went on to win the Mid-Con tournament to receive an automatic bid to the NCAA tournament. As No. 13 seed in the East region, the Crusaders lost to No. 4 seed Kentucky, 83–68, to finish with a record of 25–8 (12–2 Mid-Con).

== Roster ==
2001–02 Valparaiso Crusaders men's basketball team
Players
Coaches

Pos.	#	Name	Height	Weight	Year	Hometown
F	1	Luboš Bartoň	6 ft 8 in (2.03 m)	229 lb (104 kg)	Sr	Česká Lípa, Czechoslovakia
F/C	5	Raitis Grafs	6 ft 9 in (2.06 m)	235 lb (107 kg)	Jr	Riga, Latvia

Head coach

- Homer Drew (William Jewell)

Assistant coach(es)

Legend

- (C) Team captain
- (S) Suspended
- (I) Ineligible
- (W) Walk-on
- Injured
- Current redshirt

Roster

== Schedule and results ==
Date time, TV	Rank^{#}	Opponent^{#}	Result	Record	Site (attendance) city, state
Non-conference Regular season
Nov 16, 2001*		Purdue	L 69–73	0–1	Athletics-Recreation Center (5,425); Valparaiso, Indiana
Nov 19, 2001*		at Belmont	L 72–74	0–2	Nashville Municipal Auditorium (856); Nashville, Tennessee
Nov 21, 2001*		at Indiana State	W 71–54	1–2	Hulman Center (6,252); Terre Haute, Indiana
Nov 24, 2001*		Wisconsin–Milwaukee	W 82–69	2–2	Athletics-Recreation Center (2,611); Valparaiso, Indiana
Nov 27, 2001*		at Northern Illinois	W 70–50	3–2	Chick Evans Field House (1,594); DeKalb, Illinois
Nov 29, 2001*		Youngstown State	W 80–50	4–2	Athletics-Recreation Center (4,203); Valparaiso, Indiana
Dec 5, 2001*		at Charlotte	W 70–63	5–2	Dale F. Halton Arena (6,072); Charlotte, North Carolina
Dec 8, 2001*		Rhode Island	W 68–43	6–2	Athletics-Recreation Center (4,943); Valparaiso, Indiana
Dec 13, 2001*		Goshen	W 98–54	7–2	Athletics-Recreation Center (3,761); Valparaiso, Indiana
Dec 20, 2001*		vs. New Mexico State	L 77–94	7–3	George Q. Cannon Activities Center (556); Laie, Hawaii
Dec 21, 2001*		vs. Columbia	W 71–55	8–3	George Q. Cannon Activities Center (324); Laie, Hawaii
Dec 22, 2001*		vs. Buffalo	W 87–80	9–3	George Q. Cannon Activities Center (322); Laie, Hawaii
Dec 28, 2001*		vs. West Virginia	W 76–57	10–3	McKale Center (14,566); Tucson, Arizona
Dec 30, 2001*		at No. 14 Arizona	L 70–74	10–4	McKale Center (14,515); Tucson, Arizona
Jan 2, 2002*		at No. 2 Kansas	L 73–81	10–5	Allen Fieldhouse (16,300); Lawrence, Kansas
Mid-Continent Regular season
Jan 5, 2002		at Western Illinois	W 78–68	11–5 (1–0)	Western Hall (2,593); Macomb, Illinois
Jan 10, 2002		at Southern Utah	L 62–78	11–6 (1–1)	Centrum Arena (3,007); Cedar City, Utah
Jan 12, 2002		at Chicago State	W 78–66	12–6 (2–1)	Dickens Athletic Center (1,131); Chicago, Illinois
Jan 17, 2002		Oral Roberts	W 87–67	13–6 (3–1)	Athletics-Recreation Center (4,201); Valparaiso, Indiana
Jan 19, 2002*		UMKC	W 78–60	14–6 (4–1)	Athletics-Recreation Center (4,342); Valparaiso, Indiana
Jan 24, 2002		at IUPUI	W 74–73 ^{OT}	15–6 (5–1)	The Jungle (1,824); Indianapolis, Indiana
Jan 26, 2002		at Oakland	W 86–77	16–6 (6–1)	Athletics Center O'rena (3,505); Auburn Hills, Michigan
Feb 2, 2002		Western Illinois	W 84–60	17–6 (7–1)	Athletics-Recreation Center (5,010); Valparaiso, Indiana
Mid-Con tournament
Mar 3, 2002*		vs. Chicago State; Quarterfinals	W 81–50	23–7	Allen County War Memorial Coliseum (1,408); Fort Wayne, Indiana
Mar 4, 2002*		vs. UMKC; Semifinals	W 71–58	24–7	Allen County War Memorial Coliseum (1,489); Fort Wayne, Indiana
Mar 5, 2002*		vs. IUPUI; Championship game	W 88–55	25–7	Allen County War Memorial Coliseum (2,412); Fort Wayne, Indiana
NCAA tournament
Mar 14, 2002*	(13 E)	vs. (4 E) No. 16 Kentucky; First round	L 68–83	25–8	Edward Jones Dome (25,251); St. Louis, Missouri
*Non-conference game. ^{#}Rankings from AP poll. (#) Tournament seedings in parentheses. E=East. All times are in Central Time.
