= 1998 Mid-Continent Conference men's basketball tournament =

- Classification: Division I
- Season: 1997–98
- Teams: 7
- Site: The MARK of the Quad Cities; Moline, Illinois
- Champions: Valparaiso (4th title)
- Winning coach: Homer Drew (4th title)
- MVP: Bryce Drew (3rd MVP) (Valparaiso)
- Mid-Continent Conference men's basketball tournaments

1997–98 Mid-Continent Conference men's basketball standings
	Conf.				Overall
Team	W		L	PCT	W		L	PCT
Valparaiso †	13	–	3	.813	23	–	10	.697
Oral Roberts	12	–	4	.750	19	–	12	.613
Youngstown State	11	–	5	.688	20	–	9	.690
Western Illinois	11	–	5	.688	16	–	11	.593
Buffalo	9	–	7	.563	15	–	13	.536
Missouri–Kansas City	7	–	9	.438	9	–	18	.333
Southern Utah	4	–	12	.250	7	–	20	.259
Northeastern Illinois	3	–	13	.188	6	–	19	.240
Chicago State	2	–	14	.125	2	–	25	.074
† 1998 Mid-Con Tournament winner Rankings from

The 1998 Mid-Continent Conference men's basketball tournament was held March 1–3, 1998, at The MARK of the Quad Cities in Moline, Illinois. This was the 15th edition of the tournament for the Association of Mid-Continent Universities/Mid-Continent Conference, now known as the Summit League.

Top-seeded Valparaiso defeated #3 seed Youngstown State 67–48 to earn an automatic berth into the 1998 NCAA tournament.

== Bracket ==
Quarterfinals; March 1
4	Western Illinois	74
5	Buffalo	81
2	Oral Roberts	94
7	Southern Utah	84
3	Youngstown State	75
6	Missouri–Kansas City	59

Semifinals; March 2
1	Valparaiso	84
5	Buffalo	73
2	Oral Roberts	60
3	Youngstown State	74

Final; March 3
1	Valparaiso	67
3	Youngstown State	48
