= 1995–96 Valparaiso Crusaders men's basketball team =

American college basketball season

1995–96 Valparaiso Crusaders men's basketball

Mid-Con Regular season champions Mid-Con tournament champions

NCAA tournament, First round
- Conference: Mid-Continent Conference
- Record: 21–11 (13–5 Mid-Con)
- Head coach: Homer Drew (8th season)
- Home arena: Athletics–Recreation Center

1995–96 Mid-Continent Conference men's basketball standings
	Conf.				Overall
Team	W		L	PCT	W		L	PCT
Valparaiso †	13	–	5	.722	21	–	11	.656
Western Illinois	12	–	6	.667	17	–	12	.586
Missouri–Kansas City	10	–	8	.556	12	–	15	.444
Buffalo	10	–	8	.556	13	–	14	.481
Northeastern Illinois	10	–	8	.556	14	–	13	.519
Eastern Illinois	9	–	9	.500	13	–	15	.464
Central Connecticut State	9	–	9	.500	13	–	15	.464
Troy State	8	–	10	.444	11	–	16	.407
Youngstown State	7	–	11	.389	12	–	15	.444
Chicago State	2	–	16	.111	2	–	25	.074
† 1996 Mid-Con Tournament winner Rankings from AP Poll

The 1995–96 Valparaiso Crusaders men's basketball team represented Valparaiso University during the 1995–96 NCAA Division I men's basketball season. The Crusaders, led by eighth-year head coach Homer Drew, played their home games at the Athletics–Recreation Center as members of the Mid-Continent Conference. Valpo finished atop the conference regular season standings and followed that success by winning the Mid-Con tournament to receive the conference's automatic bid to the NCAA tournament. Playing as the No. 14 seed in the West region, the Crusaders were beaten by No. 3 seed Arizona in the opening round. The team finished with a record of 21–11 (13–5 Mid-Con) which was later adjusted to 22–10.

This season marked the first of five straight trips to the NCAA tournament and seven appearances in and eight-year period.

== Roster ==
1995–96 Valparaiso Crusaders men's basketball team
Players
Coaches

Pos.	#	Name	Height	Weight	Year	Previous school	Hometown
G		Jamie Sykes	5 ft 11 in (1.8 m)	—	So
G	24	Bryce Drew	6 ft 3 in (1.91 m)	180 lb (82 kg)	So	Valparaiso	Valparaiso, Indiana
C	33	Zoran Viskovic	6 ft 11 in (2.11 m)	—	Fr		Croatia
F	44	Bill Jenkins	6 ft 6 in (1.98 m)	—	So
F		Kareem Abdul-Jabbar Jr.	6 ft 6 in (1.98 m)	—	Fr	Brentwood

Head coach

- Homer Drew (William Jewell)

Assistant coach(es)

Legend

- (C) Team captain
- (S) Suspended
- (I) Ineligible
- (W) Walk-on
- Injured
- Current redshirt

Roster

== Schedule and results ==
Date time, TV	Rank^{#}	Opponent^{#}	Result	Record	Site (attendance) city, state
Regular season
Nov 24, 1995*		vs. Minnesota	L 66–70	0–1	Afook-Chinen Civic Auditorium; Hilo, Hawaii
Nov 26, 1995*		vs. Toledo	W 84–65	1–1	Afook-Chinen Civic Auditorium; Hilo, Hawaii
Nov 27, 1995*		vs. Utah State	W 79–70	2–1	Afook-Chinen Civic Auditorium; Hilo, Hawaii
Dec 14, 1995*		at Wisconsin	L 73–90	5–2	Wisconsin Field House; Madison, Wisconsin
Dec 21, 1995*		at Purdue	L 53–74	5–3	Mackey Arena; West Lafayette, Indiana
Dec 23, 1995*		Canisius	L 68–72	5–4	Athletics-Recreation Center; Valparaiso, Indiana
Dec 28, 1995*		at Illinois-Chicago	L 72–84	5–5	UIC Pavilion; Chicago, Illinois
Mid-Con tournament
Mar 3, 1996*		vs. Chicago State; Quarterfinals	W 118–83	19–10	The MARK of the Quad Cities; Moline, Illinois
Mar 4, 1996*		vs. Eastern Illinois; Semifinals	W 78–65	20–10	The MARK of the Quad Cities; Moline, Illinois
Mar 5, 1996*		vs. Western Illinois; Championship game	W 75–52	21–10	The MARK of the Quad Cities; Moline, Illinois
NCAA tournament
Mar 15, 1996*	(14 W)	vs. (3 W) No. 11 Arizona; First round	L 51–90	21–11	ASU Activity Center; Tempe, Arizona
*Non-conference game. ^{#}Rankings from AP poll. (#) Tournament seedings in parentheses. All times are in Central Time.
