= 1999–2000 Valparaiso Crusaders men's basketball team =

American college basketball season

1999–2000 Valparaiso Crusaders men's basketball

Mid-Con Regular season champions Mid-Con tournament champions

NCAA tournament, First Round
- Conference: Mid-Continent Conference
- Record: 19–13 (10–6 Mid-Con)
- Head coach: Homer Drew (12th season)
- Home arena: Athletics–Recreation Center

1999–2000 Mid-Continent Conference men's basketball standings
	Conf.				Overall
Team	W		L	PCT	W		L	PCT
Oakland	11	–	5	.688	13	–	17	.433
Valparaiso †	10	–	6	.625	19	–	13	.594
Southern Utah	10	–	6	.625	16	–	13	.552
Missouri–Kansas City	10	–	6	.625	16	–	13	.552
Youngstown State	9	–	7	.563	12	–	16	.429
Oral Roberts	8	–	8	.500	13	–	17	.433
Chicago State	7	–	9	.438	10	–	18	.357
IUPUI	4	–	12	.250	7	–	21	.250
Western Illinois	3	–	13	.188	8	–	22	.267
† 2000 Mid-Con Tournament winner

The 1999–2000 Valparaiso Crusaders men's basketball team represented Valparaiso University during the 1999–2000 NCAA Division I men's basketball season. The Crusaders, led by 12th-year head coach Homer Drew, played their home games at the Athletics–Recreation Center as members of the Mid-Continent Conference. Valpo finished second in the Mid-Con regular season standings, but went on to win the Mid-Con tournament to receive an automatic bid to the NCAA tournament. As No. 16 seed in the Midwest region, the Crusaders lost to No. 1 seed an eventual National champion Michigan State, 65–38, to finish with a record of 19–13 (10–6 Mid-Con).

== Roster ==
1999–2000 Valparaiso Crusaders men's basketball team
Players
Coaches

Pos.	#	Name	Height	Weight	Year	Previous school	Hometown
F	1	Luboš Bartoň	6 ft 8 in (2.03 m)	—	So
G	11	Milo Stovall	6 ft 4 in (1.93 m)	—	So
C	14	Ivan Vujic	6 ft 11 in (2.11 m)	—	Sr

Head coach

- Homer Drew (William Jewell)

Assistant coach(es)

Legend

- (C) Team captain
- (S) Suspended
- (I) Ineligible
- (W) Walk-on
- Injured
- Current redshirt

Roster

== Schedule and results ==
Date time, TV	Rank^{#}	Opponent^{#}	Result	Record	Site (attendance) city, state
Regular season
Nov 21, 1999*		Trinity International (IL)	W 100–49	1–0	Athletics-Recreation Center (2,739); Valparaiso, Indiana
Nov 26, 1999*		vs. Mississippi State	W 68–59	2–0	Family Arena (3,982); St. Charles, Missouri
Nov 27, 1999*		vs. Murray State	L 58–78	2–1	Family Arena (2,090); St. Charles, Missouri
Nov 28, 1999*		vs. Evansville	L 66–71	2–2	Family Arena (2,765); St. Charles, Missouri
Dec 2, 1999		at Oral Roberts	L 55–61	2–3 (0–1)	Mabee Center (4,701); Tulsa, Oklahoma
Dec 4, 1999*		at Minnesota	L 44–57	2–4	Williams Arena (13,872); Minneapolis, Minnesota
Dec 8, 1999*		at Notre Dame	L 42–65	2–5	Joyce Center (10,382); Notre Dame, Indiana
Dec 11, 1999*		at Houston	L 72–90	2–6	Hofheinz Pavilion (8,642); Houston, Texas
Dec 12, 1999*		at Texas A&M-Corpus Christi	W 75–67	3–6	Circle K Court (2,297); Corpus Christi, Texas
Dec 19, 1999*		Wisconsin Lutheran	W 82–43	4–6	Athletics-Recreation Center (2,755); Valparaiso, Indiana
Dec 29, 1999*		vs. Arkansas State	L 56–64	4–7	Myriad Convention Center (8,098); Oklahoma City, Oklahoma
Dec 30, 1999*		vs. Mount St. Mary's	W 68–48	5–7	Myriad Convention Center (8,265); Oklahoma City, Oklahoma
Jan 3, 2000		at UMKC	L 49–63	5–8 (0–2)	Municipal Auditorium (2,207); Kansas City, Missouri
Jan 6, 2000		at Southern Utah	L 79–86	5–9 (0–3)	America First Event Center (2,287); Cedar City, Utah
Jan 10, 2000*		Belmont	W 89–86 ^{OT}	6–9	Athletics-Recreation Center (3,728); Valparaiso, Indiana
Jan 13, 2000		Oakland	W 58–56	7–9 (1–3)	Athletics-Recreation Center (3,963); Valparaiso, Indiana
Jan 15, 2000		at Youngstown State	L 49–55	7–10 (1–4)	Beeghly Center (3,550); Youngstown, Ohio
Jan 22, 2000		Western Illinois	L 50–64	7–11 (1–5)	Athletics-Recreation Center (4,517); Valparaiso, Indiana
Jan 27, 2000		Chicago State	W 84–59	8–11 (2–5)	Athletics-Recreation Center (4,037); Valparaiso, Indiana
Jan 29, 2000		at IUPUI	W 65–49	9–11 (3–5)	The Jungle (1,429); Indianapolis, Indiana
Feb 3, 2000		at Oakland	W 65–62	10–11 (4–5)	Athletics Center O'rena (3,105); Auburn Hills, Michigan
Feb 5, 2000		Southern Utah	W 76–62	11–11 (5–5)	Athletics-Recreation Center (4,579); Valparaiso, Indiana
Feb 7, 2000*		at Belmont	W 86–60	12–11	Striplin Gymnasium (1,109); Nashville, Tennessee
Feb 10, 2000		UMKC	W 92–76	13–11 (6–5)	Athletics-Recreation Center (4,371); Valparaiso, Indiana
Feb 12, 2000		Oral Roberts	W 60–59	14–11 (7–5)	Athletics-Recreation Center (4,314); Valparaiso, Indiana
Feb 17, 2000		at Western Illinois	W 80–67	15–11 (8–5)	Western Hall (2,143); Macomb, Illinois
Feb 19, 2000		Youngstown State	W 65–57	16–11 (9–5)	Athletics-Recreation Center (4,611); Valparaiso, Indiana
Feb 24, 2000		at Chicago State	L 47–69	16–12 (9–6)	Dickens Athletic Center (1,105); Chicago, Illinois
Feb 26, 2000		IUPUI	W 68–41	17–12 (10–6)	Athletics-Recreation Center (4,814); Valparaiso, Indiana
Mid-Con tournament
Mar 6, 2000*		vs. Oral Roberts; Semifinals	W 71–56	18–12	Allen County War Memorial Coliseum (2,143); Fort Wayne, Indiana
Mar 7, 2000*		vs. Southern Utah; Championship game	W 71–62	19–12	Allen County War Memorial Coliseum (3,043); Fort Wayne, Indiana
NCAA tournament
Mar 16, 2000*; CBS	(16 MW)	vs. (1 MW) No. 2 Michigan State; First Round	L 38–65	19–13	CSU Convocation Center (13,374); Cleveland, Ohio
*Non-conference game. ^{#}Rankings from AP poll. (#) Tournament seedings in parentheses. All times are in Central Time.
