= 1997 Mid-Continent Conference men's basketball tournament =

- Classification: Division I
- Season: 1996–97
- Teams: 8
- Site: The MARK of the Quad Cities; Moline, Illinois
- Champions: Valparaiso (3rd title)
- Winning coach: Homer Drew (3rd title)
- MVP: Janthony Joseph (Western Illinois)
- Mid-Continent Conference men's basketball tournaments

1996–97 Mid-Continent Conference men's basketball standings
	Conf.				Overall
Team	W		L	PCT	W		L	PCT
Valparaiso †	13	–	5	.722	24	–	7	.774
Buffalo	11	–	5	.688	17	–	11	.607
Western Illinois	11	–	5	.688	19	–	10	.655
Troy State	10	–	6	.625	16	–	11	.593
Northeastern Illinois	8	–	8	.500	16	–	12	.571
Missouri–Kansas City	7	–	9	.438	10	–	17	.370
Youngstown State	4	–	12	.250	9	–	18	.333
Chicago State	4	–	12	.250	4	–	23	.148
Central Connecticut State	4	–	12	.250	8	–	19	.296
† 1997 Mid-Con Tournament winner Rankings from AP Poll

The 1997 Mid-Continent Conference men's basketball tournament was held March 2–4, 1997, at The MARK of the Quad Cities in Moline, Illinois. This was the 14th edition of the tournament for the Association of Mid-Continent Universities/Mid-Continent Conference, now known as the Summit League.

Top-seeded Valparaiso defeated #3 seed Western Illinois 63–59 to earn an automatic berth into the 1997 NCAA tournament.

== Bracket ==
Quarterfinals; March 2
1	Valparaiso	97
8	Central Connecticut State	73
4	Northeastern Illinois	75
5	Missouri–Kansas City	48
2	Buffalo	81
7	Chicago State	58
3	Western Illinois	66
6	Youngstown State	64

Semifinals; March 3
1	Valparaiso	88
4	Northeastern Illinois	82 ^{OT}
2	Buffalo	77
3	Western Illinois	80

Final; March 4
1	Valparaiso	63
3	Western Illinois	59
