= 1996 Mid-Continent Conference men's basketball tournament =

- Classification: Division I
- Season: 1995–96
- Teams: 8
- Site: The MARK of the Quad Cities; Moline, Illinois
- Champions: Valparaiso (2nd title)
- Winning coach: Homer Drew (2nd title)
- MVP: Bryce Drew (2nd MVP) (Valparaiso)
- Mid-Continent Conference men's basketball tournaments

1995–96 Mid-Continent Conference men's basketball standings
	Conf.				Overall
Team	W		L	PCT	W		L	PCT
Valparaiso †	13	–	5	.722	21	–	11	.656
Western Illinois	12	–	6	.667	17	–	12	.586
Missouri–Kansas City	10	–	8	.556	12	–	15	.444
Buffalo	10	–	8	.556	13	–	14	.481
Northeastern Illinois	10	–	8	.556	14	–	13	.519
Eastern Illinois	9	–	9	.500	13	–	15	.464
Central Connecticut State	9	–	9	.500	13	–	15	.464
Troy State	8	–	10	.444	11	–	16	.407
Youngstown State	7	–	11	.389	12	–	15	.444
Chicago State	2	–	16	.111	2	–	25	.074
† 1996 Mid-Con Tournament winner Rankings from AP Poll

The 1996 Mid-Continent Conference men's basketball tournament was held March 3–5, 1996, at The MARK of the Quad Cities in Moline, Illinois. This was the 13th edition of the tournament for the Association of Mid-Continent Universities/Mid-Continent Conference, now known as the Summit League.

== Bracket ==
Quarterfinals; March 3
1	Valparaiso	118
8	Chicago State	83
4	Buffalo	55
5	Eastern Illinois	59
2	Western Illinois	68
7	Youngstown State	48
3	Missouri–Kansas City	83
6	Central Connecticut State	89

Semifinals; March 4
1	Valparaiso	78
5	Eastern Illinois	65
2	Western Illinois	68
3	Central Connecticut State	66

Final; March 5
1	Valparaiso	75
2	Western Illinois	52
