= 1998–99 Valparaiso Crusaders men's basketball team =

American college basketball season

1998–99 Valparaiso Crusaders men's basketball

Mid-Con tournament champions

NCAA tournament, First Round
- Conference: Mid-Continent Conference
- Record: 23–9 (10–4 Mid-Con)
- Head coach: Homer Drew (11th season)
- Home arena: Athletics–Recreation Center

1998–99 Mid-Continent Conference men's basketball standings
	Conf.				Overall
Team	W		L	PCT	W		L	PCT
Oral Roberts	10	–	4	.714	17	–	11	.607
Valparaiso †	10	–	4	.714	23	–	9	.719
Western Illinois	9	–	5	.643	16	–	12	.571
Youngstown State	9	–	5	.643	14	–	14	.500
Southern Utah	6	–	8	.429	13	–	17	.433
IUPUI	6	–	8	.429	11	–	16	.407
Missouri–Kansas City	3	–	11	.214	8	–	22	.267
Chicago State	3	–	11	.214	3	–	24	.111
† 1999 Mid-Con Tournament winner Rankings from

The 1998–99 Valparaiso Crusaders men's basketball team represented Valparaiso University during the 1998–99 NCAA Division I men's basketball season. The Crusaders, led by 11th-year head coach Homer Drew, played their home games at the Athletics–Recreation Center as members of the Mid-Continent Conference. Valpo finished second in the Mid-Con regular season standings, but went on to win the Mid-Con tournament to receive an automatic bid to the NCAA tournament. As No. 15 seed in the Midwest region, the Crusaders lost to No. 2 seed Maryland, 82–60, to finish with a record of 23–9 (10–4 Mid-Con).

== Roster ==
1998–99 Valparaiso Crusaders men's basketball team
Players
Coaches

Pos.	#	Name	Height	Weight	Year	Previous school	Hometown
F	1	Luboš Bartoň	6 ft 8 in (2.03 m)	—	Fr
G	11	Milo Stovall	6 ft 4 in (1.93 m)	—	Fr
C	14	Ivan Vujic	6 ft 11 in (2.11 m)	—	Jr
C	33	Zoran Viskovic	6 ft 11 in (2.11 m)	—	Sr		Croatia

Head coach

- Homer Drew (William Jewell)

Assistant coach(es)

Legend

- (C) Team captain
- (S) Suspended
- (I) Ineligible
- (W) Walk-on
- Injured
- Current redshirt

Roster

== Schedule and results ==
Date time, TV	Rank^{#}	Opponent^{#}	Result	Record	Site (attendance) city, state
Regular season
Nov 7, 1998*		vs. South Carolina	W 67–61	1–0	RCA Dome; Indianapolis, Indiana
Nov 8, 1998*		vs. Seton Hall	W 64–54	2–0	RCA Dome; Indianapolis, Indiana
Mid-Con tournament
Feb 28, 1999*		vs. Chicago State; Quarterfinals	W 81–43	21–8	The MARK of the Quad Cities; Moline, Illinois
Mar 1, 1999*		vs. Western Illinois; Semifinals	W 77–59	22–8	The MARK of the Quad Cities; Moline, Illinois
Mar 2, 1999*		vs. Oral Roberts; Championship game	W 73–69	23–8	The MARK of the Quad Cities; Moline, Illinois
NCAA tournament
Mar 11, 1999*	(15 MW)	vs. (2 MW) No. 5 Maryland; First round	L 60–82	23–9	Orlando Arena; Orlando, Florida
*Non-conference game. ^{#}Rankings from AP poll. (#) Tournament seedings in parentheses. All times are in Central Time.
