= 1996–97 Valparaiso Crusaders men's basketball team =

American college basketball season

1996–97 Valparaiso Crusaders men's basketball

Mid-Con Regular season champions Mid-Con tournament champions

NCAA tournament, First round
- Conference: Mid-Continent Conference
- Record: 24–7 (13–3 Mid-Con)
- Head coach: Homer Drew (9th season)
- Home arena: Athletics–Recreation Center

1996–97 Mid-Continent Conference men's basketball standings
	Conf.				Overall
Team	W		L	PCT	W		L	PCT
Valparaiso †	13	–	5	.722	24	–	7	.774
Buffalo	11	–	5	.688	17	–	11	.607
Western Illinois	11	–	5	.688	19	–	10	.655
Troy State	10	–	6	.625	16	–	11	.593
Northeastern Illinois	8	–	8	.500	16	–	12	.571
Missouri–Kansas City	7	–	9	.438	10	–	17	.370
Youngstown State	4	–	12	.250	9	–	18	.333
Chicago State	4	–	12	.250	4	–	23	.148
Central Connecticut State	4	–	12	.250	8	–	19	.296
† 1997 Mid-Con Tournament winner Rankings from AP Poll

The 1996–97 Valparaiso Crusaders men's basketball team represented Valparaiso University during the 1996–97 NCAA Division I men's basketball season. The Crusaders, led by ninth-year head coach Homer Drew, played their home games at the Athletics–Recreation Center as members of the Mid-Continent Conference. The Crusaders won Mid-Con regular season and tournament titles, and received an automatic bid to the NCAA tournament as No. 12 seed in the West region. In the opening round, Valpo was beaten by No. 5 seed Boston College, 73–66. The team finished with a record of 24–7 (13–3 Mid-Con).

== Roster ==
1996–97 Valparaiso Crusaders men's basketball team
Players
Coaches

Pos.	#	Name	Height	Weight	Year	Previous school	Hometown
G		Jamie Sykes	5 ft 11 in (1.8 m)	—	Jr
G	24	Bryce Drew	6 ft 3 in (1.91 m)	180 lb (82 kg)	Jr	Valparaiso	Valparaiso, Indiana
C	33	Zoran Viskovic	6 ft 11 in (2.11 m)	—	So		Croatia
F	44	Bill Jenkins	6 ft 6 in (1.98 m)	—	Jr

Head coach

- Homer Drew (William Jewell)

Assistant coach(es)

Legend

- (C) Team captain
- (S) Suspended
- (I) Ineligible
- (W) Walk-on
- Injured
- Current redshirt

Roster

== Schedule and results ==
Date time, TV	Rank^{#}	Opponent^{#}	Result	Record	Site (attendance) city, state
Regular season
Nov 20, 1996*		at Vanderbilt	L 66–74	0–1	Memorial Gymnasium (11,575); Nashville, Tennessee
Nov 25, 1996*		at Canisius	W 66–52	1–1	Koessler Athletic Center (911); Buffalo, New York
Nov 27, 1996*		at Northern Illinois	W 88–83	2–1	Chick Evans Field House (1,972); DeKalb, Illinois
Dec 4, 1996*		Indiana Wesleyan	W 92–69	3–1	Athletics-Recreation Center (2,436); Valparaiso, Indiana
Dec 7, 1996*		Wisconsin–Milwaukee	W 71–46	4–1	Athletics-Recreation Center (3,011); Valparaiso, Indiana
Dec 10, 1996*		Wisconsin–Green Bay	W 50–44	5–1	Athletics-Recreation Center (3,233); Valparaiso, Indiana
Dec 14, 1996*		Illinois-Chicago	W 77–68	6–1	Athletics-Recreation Center (3,112); Valparaiso, Indiana
Dec 27, 1996*		vs. Army; Union Federal Hoosier Classic	W 88–48	7–1	Market Square Arena (12,860); Indianapolis, Indiana
Dec 28, 1996*		vs. No. 13 Indiana; Union Federal Hoosier Classic	L 51–72	7–2	Market Square Arena (13,203); Indianapolis, Indiana
Jan 2, 1997		at Troy State	W 76–70	8–2 (1–0)	Sartain Hall (334); Troy, Alabama
Jan 4, 1997		at UMKC	W 81–66	9–2 (2–0)	Municipal Auditorium (4,447); Kansas City, Missouri
Jan 6, 1997*		Youngstown State	W 57–46	10–2 (3–0)	Athletics-Recreation Center (3,410); Valparaiso, Indiana
Jan 8, 1997		Buffalo	W 72–55	11–2 (4–0)	Athletics-Recreation Center (4,117); Valparaiso, Indiana
Jan 11, 1997		at Northeastern Illinois	W 82–80 ^{OT}	12–2 (5–0)	NEIU Physical Education Complex (850); Chicago, Illinois
Jan 14, 1997		at Chicago State	W 76–59	13–2 (6–0)	Dickens Athletic Center (504); Chicago, Illinois
Jan 18, 1997*		Central Connecticut State	W 61–54	14–2 (7–0)	Athletics-Recreation Center (4,853); Valparaiso, Indiana
Jan 20, 1997*		at Oral Roberts	L 72–76	14–3	Mabee Center (5,020); Tulsa, Oklahoma
Jan 25, 1997		Western Illinois	L 78–84	14–4 (7–1)	Athletics-Recreation Center (4,459); Valparaiso, Indiana
Jan 27, 1997*		Northland	W 110–77	15–4	Athletics-Recreation Center (2,203); Valparaiso, Indiana
Feb 1, 1997		at Buffalo	W 64–62	16–4 (8–1)	Alumni Arena (5,284); Buffalo, New York
Feb 3, 1997		at Youngstown State	L 64–66	16–5 (8–2)	Beeghly Center (1,810); Youngstown, Ohio
Feb 6, 1997*		Chicago State	W 85–58	17–5 (9–2)	Athletics-Recreation Center (3,102); Valparaiso, Indiana
Feb 8, 1997		Northeastern Illinois	W 102–84	18–5 (10–2)	Athletics-Recreation Center (4,460); Valparaiso, Indiana
Feb 12, 1997		at Central Connecticut State	W 71–59	19–5 (11–2)	Detrick Gymnasium (538); New Britain, Connecticut
Feb 15, 1997		at Western Illinois	W 83–74	20–5 (12–2)	Western Hall (3,647); Macomb, Illinois
Feb 22, 1997		UMKC	W 90–63	21–5 (12–3)	Athletics-Recreation Center (4,251); Valparaiso, Indiana
Feb 24, 1997		Troy State	L 69–72 ^{OT}	21–6 (13–3)	Athletics-Recreation Center (4,477); Valparaiso, Indiana
Mid-Con tournament
Mar 2, 1997*		vs. Central Connecticut State; Quarterfinals	W 97–73	22–6	The MARK of the Quad Cities (NA); Moline, Illinois
Mar 3, 1997*		vs. Northeastern Illinois; Semifinals	W 88–82 ^{OT}	23–6	The MARK of the Quad Cities (NA); Moline, Illinois
Mar 4, 1997*		vs. Western Illinois; Championship game	W 63–59	24–6	The MARK of the Quad Cities (4,251); Moline, Illinois
NCAA tournament
Mar 13, 1997*	(12 W)	vs. (5 W) No. 23 Boston College; First round	L 66–73	24–7	Jon M. Huntsman Center (12,541); Salt Lake City, Utah
*Non-conference game. ^{#}Rankings from AP poll. (#) Tournament seedings in parentheses. All times are in Central Time.
