= 1997–98 UMKC Kangaroos men's basketball team =

American college basketball season

1997–98 UMKC Kangaroos men's basketball
- Conference: Mid–Continent Conference
- Record: 9–18 (7–9 Mid–Con)
- Head coach: Bob Sundvold (2nd season)
- Assistant coaches: Brian Ostermann (2nd season); Bernie Pearson (1st season); Mike Sharpe (1st season)
- Home arena: Municipal Auditorium, Kemper Arena

1997–98 Mid-Continent Conference men's basketball standings
	Conf.				Overall
Team	W		L	PCT	W		L	PCT
Valparaiso †	13	–	3	.813	23	–	10	.697
Oral Roberts	12	–	4	.750	19	–	12	.613
Youngstown State	11	–	5	.688	20	–	9	.690
Western Illinois	11	–	5	.688	16	–	11	.593
Buffalo	9	–	7	.563	15	–	13	.536
Missouri–Kansas City	7	–	9	.438	9	–	18	.333
Southern Utah	4	–	12	.250	7	–	20	.259
Northeastern Illinois	3	–	13	.188	6	–	19	.240
Chicago State	2	–	14	.125	2	–	25	.074
† 1998 Mid-Con Tournament winner Rankings from

The 1997–98 UMKC Kangaroos men's basketball team represented the University of Missouri–Kansas City during the 1997–98 NCAA Division I men's basketball season. The Kangaroos played their home games off-campus, primarily at Municipal Auditorium (with one at Kemper Arena) in Kansas City, Missouri, as a member of the Mid–Continent Conference.

== Previous season ==
The Kangaroos finished the 1996–97 season with a record of 10–17 overall, 7–9 in the Mid–Continent Conference to finish in sixth place.

== Roster ==
1997–98 UMKC Kangaroos men's basketball team
Players
Coaches

Pos.	#	Name	Height	Weight	Year	Previous school	Hometown
G	21	Anthony Perry	6 ft 2 in (1.88 m)	—	Sr	Missouri State–West Plains; Northside HS	Fort Smith, AR
C	45	Seth Breitkreutz	6 ft 9 in (2.06 m)	221 lb (100 kg)	Jr	Bethany Lutheran; Redwood Valley HS	Redwood Falls, MN
G	44	Anton Hall	6 ft 2 in (1.88 m)	206 lb (93 kg)	Jr	Kennedy–King; Manley Career HS	Chicago, IL
F	15	Jimmy Keller	6 ft 6 in (1.98 m)	224 lb (102 kg)	Jr	Cloud County CC; Milwaukee Lutheran HS	Milwaukee, WI
C	42	Geoff Markos	6 ft 8 in (2.03 m)	—	Jr	Butler County CC
G	12	Nick Richmond	6 ft 2 in (1.88 m)	—	Jr	Frayser HS	Memphis, TN
G	33	Eddie Smith	6 ft 0 in (1.83 m)	170 lb (77 kg)	Jr	Cloud County CC; Omaha Central HS	Omaha, NE
G	32	Paul Taylor	6 ft 0 in (1.83 m)	—	Jr	Northeast Missouri State	Columbia, MO
G	20	Ralph Williams	6 ft 0 in (1.83 m)	—	Jr
F	31	Sherod Dent	6 ft 4 in (1.93 m)	209 lb (95 kg)	So	Columbia; John Marshall Metropolitan HS	Chicago, IL
G	10	Anthony Love	5 ft 9 in (1.75 m)	165 lb (75 kg)	So	Vashon HS	St. Louis, MO
F	4	Brad Mann	6 ft 6 in (1.98 m)	226 lb (103 kg)	So	Riverton HS	Riverton, KS
F	11	Jack Savage	6 ft 4 in (1.93 m)	206 lb (93 kg)	Fr	Houston HS	Memphis, TN

Head coach

- Bob Sundvold (South Dakota State)

Assistant coach(es)

- Brian Ostermann (Wisconsin–La Crosse)
- Bernie Pearson (Friends)
- Mike Sharpe (Kansas State)

Legend

- (C) Team captain
- (S) Suspended
- (I) Ineligible
- (W) Walk-on
- (5Y) Fifth-year Senior
- Injured
- Current redshirt

Roster
Last update: November 3, 2024

== Schedule & Results ==
Date time, TV	Rank^{#}	Opponent^{#}	Result	Record	High points	High rebounds	High assists	Site (attendance) city, state
Regular Season
November 14, 1997*		at Creighton	L 59–81	0–1	17 – Smith	6 – Keller, Williams	3 – Richmond	Omaha Civic Auditorium; Omaha, NE
November 22, 1997*		at Texas–San Antonio	L 81–82	0–2	28 – Keller	18 – Keller	5 – Keller	Convocation Center (893); San Antonio, TX
November 24, 1997*		at Texas A&M	L 61–102	0–3	11 – Smith	6 – Smith	4 – Williams	G. Rollie White Coliseum (2,501); College Station, TX
November 26, 1997*		Doane	W 74–62	1–3	16 – Smith	9 – Smith, Savage	2 – Hall, Smith, Savage	Municipal Auditorium (1,881); Kansas City, MO
December 1, 1997*		at Northern Iowa	L 61–79	1–4	16 – Keller	6 – Keller	6 – Williams	Young Arena (1,823); Waterloo, IA
December 3, 1997*		Kansas State	L 50–71	1–5	21 – Richmond	9 – Dent	2 – Williams	Municipal Auditorium (5,270); Kansas City, MO
December 6, 1997		Youngstown State	L 60–75	1–6 (0–1)	14 – Keller, Richmond	7 – Hall	3 – Keller, Richmond, Smith	Municipal Auditorium (1,378); Kansas City, MO
December 10, 1997*		Denver	W 66–54	2–6	14 – Richmond, Williams	11 – Williams	3 – Keller	Municipal Auditorium (1,189); Kansas City, MO
December 13, 1997*; 1:00 PM		Saint Louis	L 59–68	2–7	13 – Richmond	6 – Keller, Mann	3 – Keller, Smith, Williams	Municipal Auditorium (2,632); Kansas City, MO
December 16, 1997*		South Alabama	L 52–79	2–8	15 – Dent	5 – Mann	3 – Richmond, Williams	Municipal Auditorium (1,715); Kansas City, MO
December 20, 1997		Valparaiso	L 68–80	2–9 (0–2)	13 – Keller, Williams	7 – Keller	5 – Williams	Municipal Auditorium (1,823); Kansas City, MO
December 29, 1997*		at California Polytechnic State– San Luis Obispo	L 78–79	2–10	16 – Savage	10 – Savage	3 – Savage	Mott Gym (2,666); San Luis Obispo, CA
January 3, 1998		at Western Illinois	L 63–85	2–11 (0–3)	19 – Smith	6 – Smith	3 – Williams	Western Hall (3,304); Macomb, IL
January 8, 1998		at Northeastern Illinois	W 88–62	3–11 (1–3)	19 – Smith	9 – Breitkreutz	5 – Richmond	Physical Education Complex (155); Chicago, IL
January 10, 1998		at Chicago State	L 69–79	3–12 (1–4)	17 – Savage	10 – Hall	3 – Williams	Jacoby D. Dickens Physical; Education and Athletics Center (221); Chicago, IL
January 15, 1998		Oral Roberts	L 63–65	3–13 (1–5)	14 – Breitkreutz	9 – Keller	5 – Savage	Municipal Auditorium (2,083); Kansas City, MO
January 17, 1998		Southern Utah	W 80–51	4–13 (2–5)	13 – Dent	7 – Smith, Dent, Mann	5 – Hall	Municipal Auditorium (2,083); Kansas City, MO
January 21, 1998		at Buffalo	W 81–67	5–11 (3–5)	14 – Smith	7 – Keller, Savage	5 – Smith	Alumni Arena (1,371); Amherst, NY
January 31, 1998		Western Illinois	W 71–64 ^{OT}	6–13 (4–5)	21 – Smith	5 – Keller, Dent, Mann	3 – Smith	Municipal Auditorium (6,883); Kansas City, MO
February 5, 1998		Chicago State	W 89–65	7–13 (5–5)	15 – Perry	7 – Perry	8 – Hall	Municipal Auditorium (1,690); Kansas City, MO
February 7, 1998		Northeastern Illinois	W 93–67	8–13 (6–5)	19 – Dent	6 – Perry, Keller	5 – Dent, Savage	Kemper Arena (2,310); Kansas City, MO
February 12, 1998		at Southern Utah	L 62–71	8–14 (6–6)	13 – Dent	9 – Hall	3 – Hall, Mann	Centrum Arena (2,066); Cedar City, UT
February 14, 1998		at Oral Roberts	L 75–89	8–15 (6–7)	20 – Smith	7 – Smith	5 – Smith	Mabee Center (6,024); Tulsa, OK
February 16, 1998		at Youngstown State	L 47–69	8–16 (6–8)	9 – Keller	5 – Hall, Dent, Savage	4 – Richmond	Beeghly Physical Education Center (2,100); Youngstown, OH
February 21, 1998		Buffalo	W 78–68	9–16 (7–8)	15 – Dent	10 – Keller	4 – Hall, Smith	Municipal Auditorium (3,553); Kansas City, MO
February 23, 1998		at Valparaiso	L 65–75	9–17 (7–9)	14 – Perry	6 – Savage	3 – Hall, Smith, Savage	Athletics–Recreation Center (4,019); Valparaiso, IN
Conference Tournament
March 1, 1998*; 6:00 PM	(6)	vs. (3) Youngstown State; Quarterfinal	L 59–75	9–18	10 – Hall, Keller	7 – Perry	2 – Perry, Keller, Smith	The MARK of the Quad Cities; Moline, IL
*Non-conference game. ^{#}Rankings from AP Poll. (#) Tournament seedings in parentheses. All times are in Central Standard Time (CST).
