= Bob Sundvold =

American basketball player and coach

Current position
- Title: Head coach
- Team: Missouri–St. Louis
- Conference: GLVC
- Record: 232–150 (.607)

Biographical details
- Born: June 15, 1955 (age 71); Sioux Falls, South Dakota, U.S.

Playing career
- 1973–1975: Platte CC
- 1975–1977: South Dakota State

Coaching career (HC unless noted)
- 1978–1991: Missouri (assistant)
- 1991–1992: Southwest Missouri State (assistant)
- 1992–1996: Central Missouri
- 1996–2000: Missouri–Kansas City
- 2001–2004: Iowa State (assistant)
- 2004–2005: Kansas City Knights
- 2008–2010: Toledo (assistant)
- 2012–2013: Eastern Illinois (assistant)
- 2013–present: Missouri–St. Louis

Head coaching record
- Overall: 356–259 (.579)
- Tournaments: 13–6 (NCAA Division II)

Accomplishments and honors

Championships
- 1 GLVC regular season (2020); 1 GLVC tournament (2022); 1 GLVC Central Division (2022)

Awards
- 1× GLVC Coach of the Year (2020)

Bob Sundvold (born June 15, 1955) is an American college basketball coach, currently head coach of the Tritons of the NCAA Division II University of Missouri–St. Louis.

Sundvold, the older brother of former NBA player Jon Sundvold, was an all-conference player at South Dakota State. In 1978, he started his coaching career as an assistant to Norm Stewart at Missouri. His first head coaching job came at Division II Central Missouri in 1992, where in four years his teams went 81–39 with three NCAA Tournament berths. From there he moved to Division I UMKC, where he led the Kangaroos to a 43–70 mark from 1996 to 2000.

After spending several seasons as a college assistant coach, announcer, and professional coach in the American Basketball Association, Sundvold returned to college as a head coach in 2013 as he was named head coach of the University of Missouri–St. Louis.

== Head coaching record ==
Record table
Season	Team	Overall	Conference	Standing	Postseason
Central Missouri State Mules (Mid-America Intercollegiate Athletics Association) (1992–1996)
1992–93	Central Missouri State	13–14	6–10	7th	
1993–94	Central Missouri State	22–8	12–4	2nd	NCAA Division II Round of 32
1994–95	Central Missouri State	24–8	11–5	4th	NCAA Division II Elite Eight
1995–96	Central Missouri State	22–9	9–7	4th	NCAA Division II Round of 32
Central Missouri State:		81–39 (.675)	38–26 (.594)		
UMKC Kangaroos (Mid-Continent Conference) (1996–2000)
1996–97	UMKC	10–17	7–9	6th	
1997–98	UMKC	9–18	7–9	6th	
1998–99	UMKC	8–22	3–11	T–7th	
1999–2000	UMKC	16–13	10–6	T–2nd	
UMKC:		43–70 (.381)	27–35 (.435)		
Missouri–St. Louis Tritons (Great Lakes Valley Conference) (2013–present)
2013–14	Missouri–St. Louis	16–12	9–9	3rd (West)	
2014–15	Missouri–St. Louis	19–11	10–8	3rd (West)	
2015–16	Missouri–St. Louis	12–16	6–12	5th (West)	
2016–17	Missouri–St. Louis	11–18	5–13	T–6th (West)	
2017–18	Missouri–St. Louis	14–13	9–9	2nd (Central)	
2018–19	Missouri–St. Louis	20–9	11–7	T–6th	
2019–20	Missouri–St. Louis	27–6	16–4	T–1st	NCAA Division II Canceled*
2020–21	Missouri–St. Louis	13–6	12–5	2nd (Central)	
2021–22	Missouri–St. Louis	26–7	14–5	1st (Central)	NCAA Division II Sweet 16
2022–23	Missouri–St. Louis	24–11	11–9	T–4th	NCAA Division II Elite Eight
2023–24	Missouri–St. Louis	13–16	11–9	T–6th	
2024–25	Missouri–St. Louis	21–12	15–5	2nd	NCAA Division II Sweet 16
2025–26	Missouri–St. Louis	16–13	10–10	T–8th	
Missouri–St. Louis:		232–150 (.607)	139–105 (.570)		
Total:		356–259 (.579)	204–166 (.551)		
National champion Postseason invitational champion Conference regular season champion Conference regular season and conference tournament champion Division regular season champion Division regular season and conference tournament champion Conference tournament champion

*The 2020 NCAA tournament was canceled due to concerns over the coronavirus pandemic.
