= 2001–02 UMKC Kangaroos men's basketball team =

American college basketball season

2001–02 UMKC Kangaroos men's basketball
- Conference: Mid–Continent Conference
- Record: 18–11 (7–7 Mid–Con)
- Head coach: Rich Zvosec (1st season)
- Associate head coach: Ken Dempsey (1st season)
- Assistant coach: Jason Ivey (2nd season)
- Home arena: Municipal Auditorium, Kemper Arena

2001–02 Mid-Continent Conference men's basketball standings
	Conf.				Overall
Team	W		L	PCT	W		L	PCT
Valparaiso †	12	–	2	.857	25	–	8	.758
Oral Roberts	10	–	4	.714	17	–	14	.548
Oakland	10	–	4	.714	17	–	13	.567
Southern Utah	8	–	6	.571	11	–	16	.407
UMKC	7	–	7	.500	18	–	11	.621
IUPUI	6	–	8	.429	15	–	15	.500
Western Illinois	3	–	11	.214	12	–	16	.429
Chicago State	0	–	14	.000	2	–	26	.071
† 2002 Mid-Con Tournament winner Rankings from AP Poll

The 2001–02 UMKC Kangaroos men's basketball team represented the University of Missouri–Kansas City during the 2001–02 NCAA Division I men's basketball season. The Kangaroos played their home games off-campus, most at Municipal Auditorium (with three at Kemper Arena) in Kansas City, Missouri, as a member of the Mid–Continent Conference.

== Previous season ==
The Kangaroos finished the 2000–2001 season with a record of 14–16 overall, 9–7 in the Mid–Continent Conference to finish in fourth place.

== Roster ==
2001–02 UMKC Kangaroos men's basketball team
Players
Coaches

Pos.	#	Name	Height	Weight	Year	Previous school	Hometown
G	4	Marcus Golson	6 ft 8 in (2.03 m)	195 lb (88 kg)	Sr	Butler County CC/ Baylor; Blue Valley Northwest HS	Kansas City, KS
G	30	Michael Jackson	6 ft 7 in (2.01 m)	215 lb (98 kg)	Sr	Butler County CC; Blue Valley Northwest HS	Overland Park, KS
G	40	Will Palmer	6 ft 7 in (2.01 m)	235 lb (107 kg)	Sr	Truman HS	Independence, MO
G	12	Marc Stricker (injured) (redshirt)	6 ft 4 in (1.93 m)	190 lb (86 kg)	Sr	Christian Brothers College HS	St. Louis, MO
G	11	Matt Suther	6 ft 4 in (1.93 m)	195 lb (88 kg)	Sr	Butler County CC; Frankfort HS	Frankfort, KS
G	5	Randall Atchison	6 ft 5 in (1.96 m)	202 lb (92 kg)	Jr	Piper HS	Fort Lauderdale, FL
F	50	Tom Curtis	6 ft 9 in (2.06 m)	225 lb (102 kg)	Jr	Grand Rapids CC; Garden City HS	Garden City, MI
C	32	Carlton Aaron (redshirt)	6 ft 9 in (2.06 m)	322 lb (146 kg)	So	Temple; The Winchendon/ Atlantic Shores Christian	Bronx, NY
C	45	Randall Logan	6 ft 10 in (2.08 m)	300 lb (136 kg)	So	Shaw; James Madison University HS	Milwaukee, WI
F	22	Michael Watson	6 ft 4 in (1.93 m)	185 lb (84 kg)	So	Central HS	Kansas City, MO
C	54	Dan Leadbetter	6 ft 10 in (2.08 m)	265 lb (120 kg)	Fr	Abingdon–Avon HS	Abingdon, IL
F	15	Brandon Lipsey (redshirt)	6 ft 8 in (2.03 m)	200 lb (91 kg)	Fr	Sumner Arts And Science	Kansas City, KS
G	21	Edward Spencer	6 ft 2 in (1.88 m)	180 lb (82 kg)	Fr	Prairie View HS	Kansas City, MO

Head coach

- Rich Zvosec (Defiance)

Assistant coach(es)

- Ken Dempsey (Moravian)
- Jason Ivey (Temple)

Legend

- (C) Team captain
- (S) Suspended
- (I) Ineligible
- (W) Walk-on
- (5Y) Fifth-year Senior
- Injured
- Current redshirt

Roster
Last update: November 3, 2024

== Schedule & Results ==
Date time, TV	Rank^{#}	Opponent^{#}	Result	Record	High points	High rebounds	High assists	Site (attendance) city, state
Exhibition Season
November 6, 2001*; 7:00 PM		Australian National Team						Municipal Auditorium; Kansas City, MO
November 13, 2001*; 7:00 PM		M. M. S. (Amateur Athletic Union)						Municipal Auditorium; Kansas City, MO
Regular Season
November 17, 2001*; 7:05 PM		at Wisconsin–Green Bay	W 48–47	1–0	16 – Watson	5 – Curtis, Watson	3 – Jackson	Brown County; Veterans Memorial Arena (2,851); Ashwaubenon, WI
November 24, 2001*; 7:00 PM		Maryland–Eastern Shore	W 58–55	2–0	21 – Golson	7 – Golson, Jackson	6 – Suther	Municipal Auditorium; Kansas City, MO
November 27, 2001*; 7:30 PM		Southwest Missouri State	W 69–63 ^{OT}	3–0	29 – Watson	10 – Golson	8 – Suther	Municipal Auditorium (3,522); Kansas City, MO
December 1, 2001*; 7:00 PM		Northern Iowa	W 79–64	4–0	23 – Watson	7 – Jackson	6 – Jackson, Watson	Municipal Auditorium (4,055); Kansas City, MO
December 5, 2001*; 6:30 PM		at Robert Morris	W 70–63	5–0	26 – Watson	8 – Suther	3 – Suther, Watson	Charles L. Sewall Center (434); Moon Township, PA
December 8, 2001*; 7:05 PM		at No. 4 Kansas	L 68–79	5–1	29 – Watson	10 – Jackson	4 – Suther	Allen Fieldhouse (16,300); Lawrence, KS
December 15, 2001*; 1:00 PM		Wisconsin–Green Bay	W 67–54	6–1	24 – Watson	11 – Golson	2 – Palmer, Suther, Watson	Municipal Auditorium (3,709); Kansas City, MO
December 19, 2001*; 7:00 PM		No. 6 Oklahoma State	L 50–62	6–2	14 – Golson, Watson	10 – Golson	4 – Suther	Municipal Auditorium (8,643); Kansas City, MO
December 22, 2001*; 7:00 PM		Youngstown State	W 68–53	7–2	18 – Watson	12 – Curtis	6 – Jackson	Municipal Auditorium (3,755); Kansas City, MO
December 28, 2001*; 5:00 PM		vs. Arkansas State; Koch Petroleum Islander Classic [Semifinal]	L 58–60	7–3	21 – Jackson	6 – Jackson, Curtis	4 – Suther	Memorial Coliseum; Corpus Christi, TX
December 29, 2001*; 5:00 PM		vs. Wayland Baptist; Koch Petroleum Islander Classic [Consolation Final]	W 63–53	8–3	31 – Watson	7 – Golson	3 – Suther, Watson	Memorial Coliseum; Corpus Christi, TX
January 5, 2002; 7:00 PM		Oral Roberts	L 55–67	8–4 (0–1)	27 – Watson	7 – Jackson	2 – Jackson, Suther	Municipal Auditorium (4,221); Kansas City, MO
January 10, 2002; 7:00 PM		Oakland	W 72–63	9–4 (1–1)	18 – Golson	13 – Golson	4 – Watson	Municipal Auditorium (2,685); Kansas City, MO
January 12, 2002; 7:00 PM		Indiana/Purdue–Indianapolis	L 63–64 ^{OT}	9–5 (1–2)	16 – Golson, Jackson	9 – Palmer	3 – Jackson, Watson	Municipal Auditorium (4,611); Kansas City, MO
January 14, 2002*; 7:00 PM		Texas A&M–Corpus Christi	W 67–61	10–5	16 – Jackson, Watson	9 – Jackson, Curtis	6 – Watson	Kemper Arena (1,579); Kansas City, MO
January 17, 2002; 7:00 PM		at Western Illinois	W 63–51	11–5 (2–2)	24 – Watson	8 – Jackson	6 – Suther	Western Hall (2,393); Macomb, IL
January 19, 2002; 11:00 AM		at Valparaiso	L 60–78	11–6 (2–3)	23 – Watson	7 – Jackson	4 – Suther	Athletics–Recreation Center (4,342); Valparaiso, IN
January 24, 2002; 7:00 PM		Chicago State	W 67–53	12–6 (3–3)	23 – Watson	9 – Golson	4 – Atchison	Kemper Arena (2,026); Kansas City, MO
January 26, 2002; 7:00 PM		Southern Utah	L 49–54	12–7 (3–4)	16 – Golson	10 – Curtis	6 – Suther	Kemper Arena (2,355); Kansas City, MO
February 2, 2002; 7:00 PM		at Oral Roberts	L 75–85	12–8 (3–5)	31 – Watson	7 – Watson	3 – Jackson, Watson	Mabee Center (6,827); Tulsa, OK
February 7, 2002; 6:00 PM		at Indiana/Purdue–Indianapolis	W 55–54	13–8 (4–5)	15 – Jackson	5 – Palmer	3 – Watson	IUPUI Gymnasium (1,127); Indianapolis, IN
February 9, 2002; 5:00 PM		at Oakland	L 59–72	13–9 (4–6)	21 – Watson	6 – Golson, Suther	2 – Golson, Suther, Watson	Athletics Center O'rena (2,315); Auburn Hills, MI
February 14, 2002; 7:00 PM		Valparaiso	L 63–76	13–10 (4–7)	34 – Watson	6 – Jackson	8 – Suther	Municipal Auditorium (3,546); Kansas City, MO
February 16, 2002; 7:00 PM		Western Illinois	W 64–52	14–10 (5–7)	24 – Watson	10 – Jackson	4 – Watson	Municipal Auditorium (4,443); Kansas City, MO
February 21, 2002; 8:05 PM		at Southern Utah	W 72–71 ^{OT}	15–10 (6–7)	31 – Watson	7 – Golson	3 – Golson, Suther, Watson	Centrum Arena (1,085); Cedar City, UT
February 23, 2002; 4:00 PM		at Chicago State	W 61–48	16–10 (7–7)	29 – Jackson	5 – Suther, Curtis	7 – Watson	Jacoby D. Dickens Physical; Education and Athletics Center (629); Chicago, IL
February 26, 2002*; 7:00 PM		Indiana/Purdue–Fort Wayne	W 81–66	17–10	20 – Jackson	16 – Palmer	3 – Suther	Municipal Auditorium (2,527); Kansas City, MO
Conference Tournament
March 3, 2002*; 2:15 PM	(5)	vs. (4) Southern Utah [Quarterfinal]	W 70–57	18–10	29 – Watson	8 – Jackson	5 – Watson	Allen County; War Memorial Coliseum (1,408); Fort Wayne, IN
March 4, 2002*; 6:00 PM	(5)	vs. (1) Valparaiso [Semifinal]	L 58–71	18–11	27 – Watson	9 – Curtis	3 – Suther	Allen County; War Memorial Coliseum; Fort Wayne, IN
*Non-conference game. ^{#}Rankings from AP Poll. (#) Tournament seedings in parentheses. All times are in Central Standard Time (CST).
