= 1998–99 UMKC Kangaroos men's basketball team =

American college basketball season

1998–99 UMKC Kangaroos men's basketball
- Conference: Mid–Continent Conference
- Record: 8–22 (3–11 Mid–Con)
- Head coach: Bob Sundvold (3rd season)
- Assistant coaches: Brian Ostermann (3rd season); Bernie Pearson (2nd season); Mike Sharpe (2nd season)
- Home arena: Municipal Auditorium

1998–99 Mid-Continent Conference men's basketball standings
	Conf.				Overall
Team	W		L	PCT	W		L	PCT
Oral Roberts	10	–	4	.714	17	–	11	.607
Valparaiso †	10	–	4	.714	23	–	9	.719
Western Illinois	9	–	5	.643	16	–	12	.571
Youngstown State	9	–	5	.643	14	–	14	.500
Southern Utah	6	–	8	.429	13	–	17	.433
IUPUI	6	–	8	.429	11	–	16	.407
Missouri–Kansas City	3	–	11	.214	8	–	22	.267
Chicago State	3	–	11	.214	3	–	24	.111
† 1999 Mid-Con Tournament winner Rankings from

The 1998–99 UMKC Kangaroos men's basketball team represented the University of Missouri–Kansas City during the 1998–99 NCAA Division I men's basketball season. The Kangaroos played their home games off-campus at Municipal Auditorium in Kansas City, Missouri as a member of the Mid–Continent Conference.

== Previous season ==
The Kangaroos finished the 1997–98 season with a record of 9–18 overall, 7–9 in the Mid–Continent Conference to finish in sixth place.

== Roster ==
1998–99 UMKC Kangaroos men's basketball team
Players
Coaches

Pos.	#	Name	Height	Weight	Year	Previous school	Hometown
C	45	Seth Breitkreutz	6 ft 9 in (2.06 m)	221 lb (100 kg)	Sr	Bethany Lutheran; Redwood Valley HS	Redwood Falls, MN
G	44	Anton Hall	6 ft 2 in (1.88 m)	206 lb (93 kg)	Sr	Kennedy–King; Manley Career HS	Chicago, IL
F	15	Jimmy Keller	6 ft 6 in (1.98 m)	224 lb (102 kg)	Sr	Cloud County CC; Milwaukee Lutheran HS	Milwaukee, WI
C	3	Hal Lewis	6 ft 7 in (2.01 m)	225 lb (102 kg)	Sr	Alabama–Birmingham/ Cowley; Eufaula HS	Eufaula, AL
G	12	Nick Richmond	6 ft 2 in (1.88 m)	180 lb (82 kg)	Sr	Frayser HS	Memphis, TN
G	33	Eddie Smith	6 ft 0 in (1.83 m)	170 lb (77 kg)	Sr	Cloud County CC; Omaha Central HS	Omaha, NE
F	31	Sherod Dent	6 ft 4 in (1.93 m)	209 lb (95 kg)	Jr	Columbia; John Marshall Metropolitan HS	Chicago, IL
G	10	Anthony Love	5 ft 9 in (1.75 m)	165 lb (75 kg)	Jr	Vashon HS	St. Louis, MO
F	4	Brad Mann	6 ft 6 in (1.98 m)	226 lb (103 kg)	Jr	Riverton HS	Riverton, KS
F	11	Jack Savage	6 ft 4 in (1.93 m)	206 lb (93 kg)	So	Houston HS	Memphis, TN
G	21	Robby Graves	6 ft 2 in (1.88 m)	205 lb (93 kg)	Fr	Lee's Summit HS	Lee's Summit, MO
G	40	Will Palmer	6 ft 7 in (2.01 m)	235 lb (107 kg)	Fr	Truman HS	Independence, MO
G	32	Marc Stricker	6 ft 4 in (1.93 m)	185 lb (84 kg)	Fr	Christian Brothers College HS	St. Louis, MO

Head coach

- Bob Sundvold (South Dakota State)

Assistant coach(es)

- Brian Ostermann (Wisconsin–La Crosse)
- Bernie Pearson (Friends)
- Mike Sharpe (Kansas State)

Legend

- (C) Team captain
- (S) Suspended
- (I) Ineligible
- (W) Walk-on
- (5Y) Fifth-year Senior
- Injured
- Current redshirt

Roster
Last update: November 3, 2024

== Schedule & Results ==
Date time, TV	Rank^{#}	Opponent^{#}	Result	Record	High points	High rebounds	High assists	Site (attendance) city, state
Regular Season
November 14, 1998*		at South Alabama	L 62–74	0–1	20 – Smith	5 – Keller	4 – Dent	Mitchell Center (1,715); Mobile, AL
November 18, 1998*; 7:00 PM		Creighton	L 58–79	0–2	26 – Smith	8 – Dent	3 – Smith	Municipal Auditorium (1,552); Kansas City, MO
November 21, 1998*		William Penn	W 86–48	1–2	15 – Keller	11 – Keller	3 – Mann	Municipal Auditorium (1,511); Kansas City, MO
November 23, 1998*		at Southwest Missouri State	L 62–74	1–3	20 – Smith	5 – Keller	4 – Dent	John Q. Hammons; Student Center (8,074); Springfield, MO
November 27, 1998*		vs. Illinois State; AT&T/Hawaii Pacific University; Thanksgiving Classic [Quarterfinal]	L 48–50	1–4	12 – Keller, Lewis	7 – Dent	2 – Smith	Neal S. Blaisdell Arena (1,650); Honolulu, HI
November 28, 1998*		vs. Hofstra; AT&T/Hawaii Pacific University; Thanksgiving Classic [Consolation Semifinal]	W 52–51	2–4	13 – Keller	5 – Lewis	6 – Smith	Neal S. Blaisdell Arena; Honolulu, HI
November 29, 1998*		vs. Baylor; AT&T/Hawaii Pacific University; Thanksgiving Classic [Consolation Final]	W 49–46	3–4	13 – Richmond	14 – Keller	2 – Keller	Neal S. Blaisdell Arena; Honolulu, HI
December 5, 1998		at Valparaiso	L 63–66	3–5 (0–1)	15 – Richmond	7 – Breitkreutz	9 – Smith	Athletics–Recreation Center (4,411); Valparaiso, IN
December 7, 1998		at Indiana/Purdue–Indianapolis	L 76–80	3–6 (0–2)	27 – Smith	10 – Keller	3 – Richmond, Smith, Dent, Graves	IUPUI Gymnasium (977); Indianapolis, IN
December 12, 1998*		at Wisconsin–Milwaukee	W 88–68	4–6	22 – Lewis, Smith	5 – Lewis	7 – Stricker	J. Martin Klotsche Center (1,134); Milwaukee, WI
December 16, 1998*		Texas–San Antonio	L 83–85	4–7	19 – Smith	6 – Palmer	4 – Richmond, Graves	Municipal Auditorium (1,283); Kansas City, MO
December 19, 1998*		at Kansas State	L 39–67	4–8	11 – Smith	7 – Graves	3 – Richmond	Fred Bramlage Coliseum (8,800); Manhattan, KS
December 22, 1998*		California Polytechnic State– San Luis Obispo	W 103–97	5–8	28 – Smith	9 – Keller	4 – Keller	Municipal Auditorium (1,207); Kansas City, MO
December 30, 1998*		Nebraska	L 65–81	5–9	19 – Graves	10 – Keller	4 – Smith	Municipal Auditorium (4,180); Kansas City, MO
January 2, 1999		Chicago State	W 64–49	6–9 (1–2)	22 – Smith	12 – Palmer	4 – Richmond, Palmer	Municipal Auditorium (1,198); Kansas City, MO
January 4, 1999		Western Illinois	W 87–81	7–9 (2–2)	22 – Smith	7 – Breitkreutz	8 – Smith	Municipal Auditorium (1,210); Kansas City, MO
January 7, 1999		Oral Roberts	L 72–80	7–10 (2–3)	23 – Smith	11 – Palmer	5 – Graves	Municipal Auditorium (1,301); Kansas City, MO
January 9, 1999		at Southern Utah	L 80–90	7–11 (2–4)	30 – Smith	7 – Mann	4 – Smith	Centrum Arena (2,453); Cedar City, UT
January 16, 1999*		at Oakland	L 81–88	7–12	19 – Mann	10 – Graves	6 – Smith	Athletics Center O'rena (712); Auburn Hills, MI
January 18, 1999		at Youngstown State	L 58–61	7–13 (2–5)	12 – Smith	8 – Mann	4 – Keller, Richmond	Beeghly Physical Education Center (1,045); Youngstown, OH
January 21, 1999		Southern Utah	L 86–87 ^{OT}	7–14 (2–6)	20 – Smith	8 – Savage	5 – Graves	Municipal Auditorium (1,471); Kansas City, MO
January 28, 1999		at Western Illinois	L 56–80	7–15 (2–7)	15 – Smith	8 – Graves	3 – Savage	Western Hall (3,784); Macomb, IL
January 30, 1999		at Chicago State	W 73–67	8–15 (3–7)	22 – Smith	5 – Smith, Graves	5 – Savage, Graves	Jacoby D. Dickens Physical; Education and Athletics Center (757); Chicago, IL
February 4, 1999		Valparaiso	L 73–86	8–16 (3–8)	16 – Graves	6 – Keller, Graves	3 – Smith, Savage	Municipal Auditorium (2,205); Kansas City, MO
February 6, 1999		Indiana/Purdue–Indianapolis	L 81–83 ^{OT}	8–17 (3–9)	19 – Keller	7 – Keller, Palmer	7 – Savage	Municipal Auditorium (1,489); Kansas City, MO
February 10, 1999*		at Denver	L 77–96	8–18	16 – Smith	9 – Palmer	3 – Richmond, Smith	Gates Field House (447); Denver, CO
February 14, 1999		at Oral Roberts	L 90–98	8–19 (3–10)	20 – Smith	6 – Graves	4 – Savage	Mabee Center (4,813); Tulsa, OK
February 18, 1999*		Oakland	L 78–90	8–20	20 – Lewis	11 – Graves	4 – Keller, Graves	Municipal Auditorium (1,320); Kansas City, MO
February 20, 1999		Youngstown State	L 62–85	8–21 (3–11)	12 – Graves	5 – Breitkreutz, Keller, Palmer	2 – Keller, Richmond, Love	Municipal Auditorium (4,021); Kansas City, MO
Conference Tournament
February 28, 1999*; 5:00 PM	(6)	vs. (3) Western Illinois [Quarterfinal]	L 71–77	8–22	21 – Richmond	5 – Keller, Lewis	5 – Richmond	The MARK of the Quad Cities (2,340); Moline, IL
*Non-conference game. ^{#}Rankings from AP Poll. (#) Tournament seedings in parentheses. All times are in Central Standard Time (CST).
