= 2000 Mid-Continent Conference men's basketball tournament =

- Classification: Division I
- Season: 1999–00
- Teams: 7
- Site: Allen County War Memorial Coliseum; Fort Wayne, Indiana
- Champions: Valparaiso (6th title)
- Winning coach: Homer Drew (6th title)
- MVP: Luboš Bartoň (Valparaiso)
- Mid-Continent Conference men's basketball tournaments

1999–2000 Mid-Continent Conference men's basketball standings
	Conf.				Overall
Team	W		L	PCT	W		L	PCT
Oakland	11	–	5	.688	13	–	17	.433
Valparaiso †	10	–	6	.625	19	–	13	.594
Southern Utah	10	–	6	.625	16	–	13	.552
Missouri–Kansas City	10	–	6	.625	16	–	13	.552
Youngstown State	9	–	7	.563	12	–	16	.429
Oral Roberts	8	–	8	.500	13	–	17	.433
Chicago State	7	–	9	.438	10	–	18	.357
IUPUI	4	–	12	.250	7	–	21	.250
Western Illinois	3	–	13	.188	8	–	22	.267
† 2000 Mid-Con Tournament winner

The 2000 Mid-Continent Conference men's basketball tournament was held March 5–7, 2000, at the Allen County War Memorial Coliseum in Fort Wayne, Indiana. This was the 17th edition of the tournament for the Association of Mid-Continent Universities/Mid-Continent Conference, now known as the Summit League.

Second seed Valparaiso defeated top seed Southern Utah 71–62 to earn an automatic berth into the 2000 NCAA tournament.

== Bracket ==
Quarterfinals; March 5
4	Youngstown State	59
5	Oral Roberts	67
2	Southern Utah	78
7	Western Illinois	68
3	Missouri–Kansas City	77
6	Chicago State	71

Semifinals; March 6
1	Valparaiso	71
5	Oral Roberts	56
2	Southern Utah	72
3	Missouri–Kansas City	54

Final; March 7
1	Valparaiso	71
2	Southern Utah	62
