= 1999–2000 UMKC Kangaroos men's basketball team =

American college basketball season

1999–2000 UMKC Kangaroos men's basketball
- Conference: Mid–Continent Conference
- Record: 16–13 (10–6 Mid–Con)
- Head coach: Bob Sundvold (4th season)
- Associate head coach: Steve Eck (1st season)
- Assistant coaches: Mike Sharpe (3rd season); Gary Abner (1st season)
- Home arena: Municipal Auditorium, Hale Arena

1999–2000 Mid-Continent Conference men's basketball standings
	Conf.				Overall
Team	W		L	PCT	W		L	PCT
Oakland	11	–	5	.688	13	–	17	.433
Valparaiso †	10	–	6	.625	19	–	13	.594
Southern Utah	10	–	6	.625	16	–	13	.552
Missouri–Kansas City	10	–	6	.625	16	–	13	.552
Youngstown State	9	–	7	.563	12	–	16	.429
Oral Roberts	8	–	8	.500	13	–	17	.433
Chicago State	7	–	9	.438	10	–	18	.357
IUPUI	4	–	12	.250	7	–	21	.250
Western Illinois	3	–	13	.188	8	–	22	.267
† 2000 Mid-Con Tournament winner

The 1999–2000 UMKC Kangaroos men's basketball team represented the University of Missouri–Kansas City during the 1999–2000 NCAA Division I men's basketball season. The Kangaroos played their home games off-campus, most at Municipal Auditorium (with two at Hale Arena) in Kansas City, Missouri, as a member of the Mid–Continent Conference.

== Previous season ==
The Kangaroos finished the 1998–99 season with a record of 8–22 overall, 3–11 in the Mid–Continent Conference to finish in a tie for seventh place.

== Roster ==
1999–2000 UMKC Kangaroos men's basketball team
Players
Coaches

Pos.	#	Name	Height	Weight	Year	Previous school	Hometown
G	10	Faress Berhe	6 ft 3 in (1.91 m)	—	Jr		Olathe, KS
F	52	Myron Brown	6 ft 7 in (2.01 m)	—	Jr
G	3	Terrance Chatman	5 ft 11 in (1.8 m)	—	Jr	Idaho/ Garden City CC; Frank Cody HS	Detroit, MI
G	4	Marcus Golson	6 ft 8 in (2.03 m)	195 lb (88 kg)	So	Butler County CC/ Baylor; Blue Valley Northwest HS	Kansas City, KS
G	21	Robby Graves	6 ft 2 in (1.88 m)	205 lb (93 kg)	So	Lee's Summit HS	Lee's Summit, MO
G	30	Michael Jackson	6 ft 7 in (2.01 m)	215 lb (98 kg)	So	Butler County CC; Blue Valley Northwest HS	Overland Park, KS
G	40	Will Palmer	6 ft 7 in (2.01 m)	235 lb (107 kg)	So	Truman HS	Independence, MO
G	32	Marc Stricker	6 ft 4 in (1.93 m)	190 lb (86 kg)	So	Christian Brothers College HS	St. Louis, MO
G	11	Matt Suther	6 ft 4 in (1.93 m)	195 lb (88 kg)	So	Butler County CC; Frankfort HS	Frankfort, KS
G	5	Randall Atchison	6 ft 5 in (1.96 m)	202 lb (92 kg)	Fr	Piper HS	Fort Lauderdale, FL
G	31	Cory Jones	6 ft 4 in (1.93 m)	—	Fr	North Little Rock HS	North Little Rock, AR
F	33	Chris Williams	6 ft 9 in (2.06 m)	—	Fr	Notre Dame HS	Los Angeles, CA

Head coach

- Bob Sundvold (South Dakota State)

Assistant coach(es)

- Steve Eck (Newman)
- Mike Sharpe (Kansas State)
- Gary Abner (Wichita State)

Legend

- (C) Team captain
- (S) Suspended
- (I) Ineligible
- (W) Walk-on
- (5Y) Fifth-year Senior
- Injured
- Current redshirt

Roster
Last update: November 3, 2024

== Schedule & Results ==
Date time, TV	Rank^{#}	Opponent^{#}	Result	Record	High points	High rebounds	High assists	Site (attendance) city, state
Non–Conference Regular Season
November 21, 1999*		William Penn	W 84–29	1–0	19 – Jackson	8 – Brown, Suther	6 – Stricker	Municipal Auditorium (1,256); Kansas City, MO
November 23, 1999*		at Northern Iowa	L 65–70	1–1	17 – Jackson, Suther	5 – Palmer	5 – Graves, Palmer	West Gymnasium (1,138); Cedar Falls, IA
November 27, 1999*		Wisconsin–Milwaukee	L 68–70	1–2	26 – Jackson	10 – Jackson	5 – Stricker	Municipal Auditorium (1,381); Kansas City, MO
November 30, 1999*		at Texas–Arlington	L 60–64	1–3	22 – Jackson	10 – Palmer	4 – Jackson	Texas Hall (682); Arlington, TX
December 4, 1999*		Arkansas–Little Rock	W 86–60	2–3	17 – Jackson	9 – Brown	7 – Suther	Municipal Auditorium (1,664); Kansas City, MO
December 8, 1999*		at Delaware State	W 53–50	3–3	25 – Jackson	10 – Jackson	5 – Suther	Memorial Hall (1,537); Dover, DE
December 11, 1999*		at Maryland–Eastern Shore	L 74–76	3–4	26 – Jackson	10 – Palmer	4 – Stricker, Suther	William P. Hytche; Athletic Center (1,505); Princess Anne, MD
December 16, 1999*		Bellevue	W 101–58	4–4	32 – Jackson	10 – Palmer	13 – Stricker	Municipal Auditorium (1,016); Kansas City, MO
December 19, 1999*; 4:30 PM		at Saint Louis	L 64–66	4–5	23 – Jackson	8 – Chatman	5 – Chatman	Kiel Center (12,657); St. Louis, MO
December 22, 1999*		Southwest Missouri State	W 70–65	5–5	32 – Jackson	8 – Chatman	6 – Suther	Municipal Auditorium (5,016); Kansas City, MO
December 28, 1999*		at No. 25 Tulsa	L 60–81	5–6	11 – Chatman	8 – Chatman	5 – Brown	Donald W. Reynolds Center (8,355); Tulsa, OK
Conference Regular Season
January 3, 2000		Valparaiso	W 63–49	6–6 (1–0)	30 – Jackson	7 – Suther	3 – Chatman	Municipal Auditorium (2,207); Kansas City, MO
January 6, 2000		at Chicago State	W 65–60	7–6 (2–0)	26 – Jackson	8 – Jackson	5 – Jackson	Jacoby D. Dickens Physical; Education and Athletics Center (895); Chicago, IL
January 8, 2000		at Western Illinois	W 66–58	8–6 (3–0)	26 – Chatman	6 – Brown, Suther	2 – Brown, Chatman, Palmer, Suther	Western Hall (1,141); Macomb, IL
January 11, 2000		Southern Utah	W 79–70	9–6 (4–0)	21 – Palmer	6 – Palmer, Stricker, Suther	5 – Jackson	Municipal Auditorium (2,246); Kansas City, MO
January 13, 2000		at Oral Roberts	L 90–98	9–7 (4–1)	19 – Suther	7 – Golson	3 – Chatman	Mabee Center (4,116); Tulsa, OK
January 18, 2000		Youngstown State	L 61–66 ^{OT}	9–8 (4–2)	21 – Palmer	7 – Jackson	2 – Jackson, Stricker, Suther	Hale Arena (2,477); Kansas City, MO
January 22, 2000		Oakland	L 62–64	9–9 (4–3)	19 – Jackson	7 – Brown, Jackson, Palmer	4 – Chatman	Hale Arena (2,033); Kansas City, MO
January 27, 2000		at Southern Utah	L 77–96	9–10 (4–4)	19 – Stricker	4 – Chatman, Jackson	6 – Suther	Centrum Arena (4,307); Cedar City, UT
February 3, 2000		Western Illinois	W 79–70	10–10 (5–4)	20 – Jackson	6 – Chatman	6 – Suther	Municipal Auditorium (2,436); Kansas City, MO
February 5, 2000		Chicago State	W 92–53	11–10 (6–4)	26 – Golson	7 – Stricker	3 – Graves, Jackson	Municipal Auditorium (2,451); Kansas City, MO
February 10, 2000		at Valparaiso	L 76–92	11–11 (6–5)	15 – Graves	5 – Brown	5 – Suther	Athletics–Recreation Center (4,371); Valparaiso, IN
February 12, 2000		at Indiana/Purdue–Indianapolis	W 70–68 ^{OT}	12–11 (7–5)	18 – Golson	10 – Jackson	3 – Chatman, Jackson	IUPUI Gymnasium (1,112); Indianapolis, IN
February 19, 2000		Oral Roberts	W 88–84 ^{OT}	13–11 (8–5)	26 – Jackson	6 – Graves	5 – Suther	Municipal Auditorium (6,536); Kansas City, MO
February 24, 2000		at Oakland	L 108–111 ^{2OT}	13–12 (8–6)	24 – Jackson	9 – Jackson	8 – Suther	Athletics Center O'rena (1,503); Auburn Hills, MI
February 26, 2000		at Youngstown State	W 83–81	14–12 (9–6)	19 – Jackson	9 – Stricker	5 – Palmer	Beeghly Physical Education Center (4,392); Youngstown, OH
February 29, 2000		Indiana/Purdue–Indianapolis	W 84–73	15–12 (10–6)	16 – Jackson	4 – Brown	6 – Stricker	Municipal Auditorium (3,361); Kansas City, MO
Conference Tournament
March 5, 2000*; 5:00 PM	(3)	vs. (6) Chicago State [Quarterfinal]	W 62–61	16–12	18 – Jackson	9 – Brown	4 – Chatman	Allen County; War Memorial Coliseum (1,539); Fort Wayne, IN
March 6, 2000*; 8:30 PM	(3)	vs. (2) Southern Utah [Semifinal]	L 54–72	16–13	17 – Jackson	7 – Golson	3 – Stricker, Suther	Allen County; War Memorial Coliseum (2,143); Fort Wayne, IN
*Non-conference game. ^{#}Rankings from AP Poll. (#) Tournament seedings in parentheses. All times are in Central Standard Time (CST).
