= 1997–98 Valparaiso Crusaders men's basketball team =

American college basketball season

1997–98 Valparaiso Crusaders men's basketball

Mid-Con Regular season champions Mid-Con tournament champions

NCAA tournament, Sweet Sixteen
- Conference: Mid-Continent Conference

Ranking
- Coaches: No. 23
- Record: 23–10 (13–3 Mid-Con)
- Head coach: Homer Drew (10th season)
- Home arena: Athletics–Recreation Center

1997–98 Mid-Continent Conference men's basketball standings
	Conf.				Overall
Team	W		L	PCT	W		L	PCT
Valparaiso †	13	–	3	.813	23	–	10	.697
Oral Roberts	12	–	4	.750	19	–	12	.613
Youngstown State	11	–	5	.688	20	–	9	.690
Western Illinois	11	–	5	.688	16	–	11	.593
Buffalo	9	–	7	.563	15	–	13	.536
Missouri–Kansas City	7	–	9	.438	9	–	18	.333
Southern Utah	4	–	12	.250	7	–	20	.259
Northeastern Illinois	3	–	13	.188	6	–	19	.240
Chicago State	2	–	14	.125	2	–	25	.074
† 1998 Mid-Con Tournament winner Rankings from

The 1997–98 Valparaiso Crusaders men's basketball team represented Valparaiso University during the 1997–98 NCAA Division I men's basketball season. The Crusaders, led by tenth-year head coach Homer Drew, played their home games at the Athletics–Recreation Center as members of the Mid-Continent Conference. This season is one of the most memorable in program history as the Crusaders made a run to the Sweet Sixteen of the NCAA tournament. The opening round victory over Ole Miss is best known for "The Shot" that sparked the Crusaders' Cinderella run. The team finished with a record of 23–10 (13–3 Mid-Con).

== Roster ==
1997–98 Valparaiso Crusaders men's basketball team
Players
Coaches

Pos.	#	Name	Height	Weight	Year	Previous school	Hometown
G	3	Jay Phifer	6 ft 2 in (1.88 m)	195 lb (88 kg)	Sr	Troy HS	Troy, Michigan
F	4	Cory Gibson	6 ft 9 in (2.06 m)	228 lb (103 kg)	So	Central HS	Battle Creek, Michigan
G	10	Jamie Sykes	5 ft 11 in (1.8 m)	185 lb (84 kg)	Sr	Kankakee HS	Kankakee, Illinois
G	20	Marko Punda	6 ft 6 in (1.98 m)	210 lb (95 kg)	Fr	New Hamption Prep HS	Split, Croatia
G	21	Jared Nuness	5 ft 11 in (1.8 m)	164 lb (74 kg)	Fr	Hopkins HS	Eden Prairie, Minnesota
G	22	Aric Graham	6 ft 3 in (1.91 m)	195 lb (88 kg)	Fr	Boone Grove HS	Valparaiso, Indiana
G	24	Bryce Drew	6 ft 3 in (1.91 m)	180 lb (82 kg)	Sr	Valparaiso HS	Valparaiso, Indiana
F	25	Aaron Thomason	6 ft 7 in (2.01 m)	232 lb (105 kg)	So	Cass Technical HS	Detroit, Michigan
F	30	Monte Gordon	6 ft 5 in (1.96 m)	215 lb (98 kg)	Fr	Roosevelt HS	Gary, Indiana
F	32	Jason Jenkins	6 ft 8 in (2.03 m)	220 lb (100 kg)	Fr	East Peoria HS	East Peoria, Illinois
C	33	Zoran Viskovic	6 ft 11 in (2.11 m)	260 lb (118 kg)	Jr		Croatia
F	43	Bob Jenkins	6 ft 6 in (1.98 m)	225 lb (102 kg)	Sr	Nicolet HS	Glendale, Wisconsin
F	44	Bill Jenkins	6 ft 6 in (1.98 m)	230 lb (104 kg)	Sr	Nicolet HS	Glendale, Wisconsin
C	52	Antanas Vilcinskas	7 ft 0 in (2.13 m)	252 lb (114 kg)	Sr	Kankakee HS	Vilnius, Lithuania

Head coach

- Homer Drew (William Jewell)

Assistant coach(es)

- Scott Drew (Butler)
- Jim Harrick Jr. (Pepperdine)
- Steve Flint (UC San Diego)

Legend

- (C) Team captain
- (S) Suspended
- (I) Ineligible
- (W) Walk-on
- Injured
- Current redshirt

Roster

== Schedule and results ==
Date time, TV	Rank^{#}	Opponent^{#}	Result	Record	Site (attendance) city, state
Regular season
Nov 15, 1997		Bethel (TN)	L 75–85	0–1	Athletics-Recreation Center (3,011); Valparaiso, Indiana
Nov 17, 1997*		No. 8 Purdue	L 56–73	0–2	Athletics-Recreation Center (5,412); Valparaiso, Indiana
Nov 28, 1997*		vs. Montana; Big Island Invitational	W 70–58	1–2	Afook-Chinen Civic Auditorium (NA); Hilo, Hawaii
Nov 29, 1997*		vs. No. 15 Stanford; Big Island Invitational	L 65–70	1–3	Afook-Chinen Civic Auditorium (NA); Hilo, Hawaii
Nov 30, 1997*		vs. Pacific; Big Island Invitational	W 75–73	2–3	Afook-Chinen Civic Auditorium (NA); Hilo, Hawaii
Dec 6, 1997		Elmhurst	W 85–70	3–3	Athletics-Recreation Center (3,481); Valparaiso, Indiana
Dec 9, 1997*		at Wisconsin–Green Bay	L 52–60	3–4	Brown County Arena (3,096); Green Bay, Wisconsin
Dec 13, 1997*		at UIC	L 51–72	3–5	UIC Pavilion (3,466); Chicago, Illinois
Dec 20, 1997		at Missouri-Kansas City	W 80–68	4–5 (1–0)	Municipal Auditorium (1,823); Kansas City, Missouri
Dec 22, 1997		at Belmont	W 78–62	5–5	Striplin Gymnasium (230); Nashville, Tennessee
Dec 31, 1997		at Western Illinois	L 62–63	5–6 (1–1)	Western Hall (3,144); Macomb, Illinois
Jan 3, 1998		Chicago State	W 82–62	6–6 (2–1)	Athletics-Recreation Center (2,214); Valparaiso, Indiana
Jan 5, 1998		Northeastern Illinois	W 72–69	7–6 (3–1)	Athletics-Recreation Center (3,102); Valparaiso, Indiana
Jan 8, 1998		at Southern Utah	W 79–70	8–6 (4–1)	America First Event Center (3,081); Cedar City, Utah
Jan 10, 1998		at Oral Roberts	L 60–68	8–7 (4–2)	Mabee Center (6,910); Tulsa, Oklahoma
Jan 17, 1998		Buffalo	W 82–80	9–7 (5–2)	Athletics-Recreation Center (3,012); Valparaiso, Indiana
Jan 21, 1998*		Northern Illinois	W 87–73	10–7	Athletics-Recreation Center (4,339); Valparaiso, Indiana
Jan 24, 1998		Youngstown State	L 66–69	10–8 (5–3)	Athletics-Recreation Center (4,413); Valparaiso, Indiana
Jan 26, 1998*		at Saint Louis	L 66–77	10–9	Scottrade Center (15,977); St. Louis, Missouri
Jan 29, 1998		at Northeastern Illinois	W 88–82	11–9 (6–3)	Physical Education Complex (550); Chicago, Illinois
Jan 31, 1998		at Chicago State	W 102–74	12–9 (7–3)	Dickens Athletic Center (403); Chicago, Illinois
Feb 5, 1998		Oral Roberts	W 90–68	13–9 (8–3)	Athletics-Recreation Center (4,341); Valparaiso, Indiana
Feb 7, 1998		Southern Utah	W 66–56	14–9 (9–3)	Athletics-Recreation Center (4,453); Valparaiso, Indiana
Feb 11, 1998		at Buffalo	W 73–64	15–9 (10–3)	Alumni Arena (3,366); Buffalo, New York
Feb 14, 1998		Belmont	W 95–61	16–9	Athletics-Recreation Center (3,876); Valparaiso, Indiana
Feb 19, 1998		at Youngstown State	W 70–68	17–9 (11–3)	Beeghly Center (5,568); Youngstown, Ohio
Feb 23, 1998		Missouri-Kansas City	W 75–65	18–9 (12–3)	Athletics-Recreation Center (4,019); Valparaiso, Indiana
Feb 25, 1998		Western Illinois	W 66–56	19–9 (13–3)	Athletics-Recreation Center (4,524); Valparaiso, Indiana
Mid-Con tournament
Mar 2, 1998*	(1)	vs. (5) Buffalo; Semifinals	W 84–73	20–9	The MARK of the Quad Cities (NA); Moline, Illinois
Mar 3, 1998*	(1)	vs. (3) Youngstown State; Championship Game	W 67–48	21–9	The MARK of the Quad Cities (NA); Moline, Illinois
NCAA tournament
Mar 13, 1998*	(13 MW)	vs. (4 MW) No. 13 Ole Miss; First round	W 70–69	22–9	Myriad Convention Center (13,349); Oklahoma City, Oklahoma
Mar 15, 1998*	(13 MW)	vs. (5 MW) Florida State; Second Round	W 83–77 ^{OT}	23–9	Myriad Convention Center (13,369); Oklahoma City, Oklahoma
Mar 20, 1998*	(13 MW)	vs. (8 MW) Rhode Island; Midwest Regional semifinal – Sweet Sixteen	L 68–74	23–10	Scottrade Center (22,172); St. Louis, Missouri
*Non-conference game. ^{#}Rankings from AP poll. (#) Tournament seedings in parentheses. All times are in Central Time.

== 1998 NBA draft ==
Round	Pick	Player	NBA Team
1	16	Bryce Drew	Houston Rockets
