= 1999 Mid-Continent Conference men's basketball tournament =

- Classification: Division I
- Season: 1998–99
- Teams: 7
- Site: The MARK of the Quad Cities; Moline, Illinois
- Champions: Valparaiso (5th title)
- Winning coach: Homer Drew (5th title)
- MVP: Milo Stovall (Valparaiso)
- Mid-Continent Conference men's basketball tournaments

1998–99 Mid-Continent Conference men's basketball standings
	Conf.				Overall
Team	W		L	PCT	W		L	PCT
Oral Roberts	10	–	4	.714	17	–	11	.607
Valparaiso †	10	–	4	.714	23	–	9	.719
Western Illinois	9	–	5	.643	16	–	12	.571
Youngstown State	9	–	5	.643	14	–	14	.500
Southern Utah	6	–	8	.429	13	–	17	.433
IUPUI	6	–	8	.429	11	–	16	.407
Missouri–Kansas City	3	–	11	.214	8	–	22	.267
Chicago State	3	–	11	.214	3	–	24	.111
† 1999 Mid-Con Tournament winner Rankings from

The 1999 Mid-Continent Conference men's basketball tournament was held February 28-March 2, 1999, at The MARK of the Quad Cities in Moline, Illinois. This was the 16th edition of the tournament for the Association of Mid-Continent Universities/Mid-Continent Conference, now known as the Summit League.

Second seed Valparaiso defeated top seed Oral Roberts 73–69 to earn an automatic berth into the 1999 NCAA tournament.

== Bracket ==
Quarterfinals; February 28
4	Youngstown State	78
5	Southern Utah	56
2	Valparaiso	81
7	Chicago State	43
3	Western Illinois	77
6	Missouri–Kansas City	71

Semifinals; March 1
1	Oral Roberts	72
4	Youngstown State	58
2	Valparaiso	77
3	Western Illinois	59

Final; March 2
1	Oral Roberts	69
2	Valparaiso	73
