= 1996–97 UMKC Kangaroos men's basketball team =

American college basketball season

1996–97 UMKC Kangaroos men's basketball
- Conference: Mid–Continent Conference
- Record: 10–17 (7–9 Mid–Con)
- Head coach: Bob Sundvold (1st season)
- Assistant coaches: Mike Nicholson (6th season); Dennis Hill (1st season); Brian Ostermann (1st season)
- Home arena: Municipal Auditorium, Swinney Recreation Center

1996–97 Mid-Continent Conference men's basketball standings
	Conf.				Overall
Team	W		L	PCT	W		L	PCT
Valparaiso †	13	–	5	.722	24	–	7	.774
Buffalo	11	–	5	.688	17	–	11	.607
Western Illinois	11	–	5	.688	19	–	10	.655
Troy State	10	–	6	.625	16	–	11	.593
Northeastern Illinois	8	–	8	.500	16	–	12	.571
Missouri–Kansas City	7	–	9	.438	10	–	17	.370
Youngstown State	4	–	12	.250	9	–	18	.333
Chicago State	4	–	12	.250	4	–	23	.148
Central Connecticut State	4	–	12	.250	8	–	19	.296
† 1997 Mid-Con Tournament winner Rankings from AP Poll

The 1996–97 UMKC Kangaroos men's basketball team represented the University of Missouri–Kansas City during the 1996–97 NCAA Division I men's basketball season. The Kangaroos played almost all of their home games off-campus at Municipal Auditorium (with the exception of one game relocated on-campus to the Swinney Recreation Center due to an electrical failure) in Kansas City, Missouri as a member of the Mid–Continent Conference.

== Previous season ==
The Kangaroos finished the 1995–96 season with a record of 12–15 overall, 10–8 in the Mid–Continent Conference to finish in a three-way tie for third place.

== Roster ==
1996–97 UMKC Kangaroos men's basketball team
Players
Coaches

Pos.	#	Name	Height	Weight	Year	Previous school	Hometown
C	11	Charles Parks	6 ft 6 in (1.98 m)	—	Sr	Kansas City Kansas CC
C	45	Tony Berg	6 ft 9 in (2.06 m)	215 lb (98 kg)	RS Jr		Colorado Springs, CO
G	33	Vinson Smith	6 ft 3 in (1.91 m)	—	RS Jr	Youngstown State; F. L. Schlagle HS	Kansas City, KS
F	5	Lonnie Alexander	6 ft 6 in (1.98 m)	—	Jr
G	20	Anthony Perry	6 ft 2 in (1.88 m)	—	Jr	Missouri State–West Plains; Northside HS	Fort Smith, AR
C	42	Geoff Markos	6 ft 8 in (2.03 m)	—	So	Butler County CC
G	12	Nick Richmond	6 ft 2 in (1.88 m)	175 lb (79 kg)	So	Frayser HS	Memphis, TN
F	34	Chaz Smith	6 ft 6 in (1.98 m)	210 lb (95 kg)	So	Hayden Catholic HS	Topeka, KS
F	3	Paul Taylor	6 ft 6 in (1.98 m)	—	So	Northeast Missouri State	Columbia, MO
G	32	Brad Moulder	6 ft 7 in (2.01 m)	—	RS Fr		Camdenton, MO
G	10	Anthony Love	5 ft 9 in (1.75 m)	165 lb (75 kg)	Fr	Vashon HS	St. Louis, MO
F	4	Brad Mann	6 ft 6 in (1.98 m)	226 lb (103 kg)	Fr	Riverton HS	Riverton, KS
G	21	Derek Stricklin	6 ft 3 in (1.91 m)	—	Fr

Head coach

- Bob Sundvold (South Dakota State)

Assistant coach(es)

- Mike Nicholson (Missouri)
- Dennis Hill (Southwest Missouri State)
- Brian Ostermann (Wisconsin–La Crosse)

Legend

- (C) Team captain
- (S) Suspended
- (I) Ineligible
- (W) Walk-on
- (5Y) Fifth-year Senior
- Injured
- Current redshirt

Roster
Last update: November 3, 2024

== Schedule & Results ==
Date time, TV	Rank^{#}	Opponent^{#}	Result	Record	High points	High rebounds	High assists	Site (attendance) city, state
Non–Conference Season
November 22, 1996*		at Kansas State	L 53–73	0–1	13 – Alexander	10 – Berg	4 – V.Smith	Fred Bramlage Coliseum (9,437); Manhattan, KS
November 25, 1996*		at Creighton	L 68–70	0–2	17 – Richmond	10 – Berg	3 – V.Smith	Omaha Civic Auditorium (4,164); Omaha, NE
November 27, 1996*		Southwest Minnesota State	W 87–64	1–2	20 – Alexander	11 – V.Smith	5 – V.Smith	Municipal Auditorium (2,310); Kansas City, MO
December 3, 1996*		at Baylor	L 71–79	1–3	18 – Berg, Richmond	23 – Berg	3 – Berg	Ferrell Center (2,115); Waco, TX
December 9, 1996*; 7:05 PM		at Saint Louis	W 74–53	2–3	20 – V.Smith	7 – Alexander	8 – V.Smith	Kiel Center (14,162); St. Louis, MO
December 11, 1996*		Nebraska	L 64–76	2–4	21 – V.Smith	10 – Alexander	4 – Richmond	Municipal Auditorium (4,897); Kansas City, MO
December 14, 1996*		Monmouth	W 84–63	3–4	22 – V.Smith	13 – Alexander	7 – V.Smith	Municipal Auditorium (1,531); Kansas City, MO
December 20, 1996*		Texas A&M	L 73–74	3–5	18 – V.Smith	17 – Alexander	3 – Parks	Municipal Auditorium (2,336); Kansas City, MO
December 28, 1996*		Colorado	L 61–82	3–6	22 – Alexander	5 – Alexander	4 – V.Smith	Municipal Auditorium (4,481); Kansas City, MO
December 30, 1996*		Northern Iowa	L 59–84	3–7	15 – Alexander	5 – Parks	6 – Love	Municipal Auditorium (4,528); Kansas City, MO
Conference Season
January 2, 1997		Western Illinois	W 80–73	4–7 (1–0)	16 – Alexander	7 – Alexander	6 – Perry	Municipal Auditorium (1,987); Kansas City, MO
January 4, 1997		Valparaiso	L 66–81	4–8 (1–1)	17 – V.Smith	8 – Alexander	6 – Richmond	Municipal Auditorium (4,447); Kansas City, MO
January 6, 1997		at Troy State	W 103–86	5–8 (2–1)	24 – Alexander	10 – Alexander	7 – Richmond	Sartain Hall (745); Troy, AL
January 11, 1997		at Buffalo	L 62–80	5–9 (2–2)	16 – V.Smith	14 – Parks	6 – Richmond	Alumni Arena (1,087); Amherst, NY
January 13, 1997		at Youngstown State	W 73–71	6–9 (3–2)	18 – V.Smith, Richmond	7 – Perry	2 – Perry, V.Smith, Richmond	Beeghly Physical Education Center (1,118); Youngstown, OH
January 18, 1997		at Chicago State	W 64–63	7–9 (4–2)	29 – Alexander	13 – Alexander	4 – Perry	Jacoby D. Dickens Physical; Education and Athletics Center (374); Chicago, IL
January 20, 1997		at Northeastern Illinois	W 87–84	8–9 (5–2)	21 – Alexander	11 – Alexander	8 – Richmond	Physical Education Complex (285); Chicago, IL
January 27, 1997		at Central Connecticut State	L 46–60	8–10 (5–3)	19 – V.Smith	5 – Parks, V.Smith	2 – V.Smith, Richmond	William H. Detrick Gymnasium (495); New Britain, CT
February 1, 1997		Troy State	L 81–87	8–11 (5–4)	27 – V.Smith	12 – V.Smith	6 – V.Smith, Richmond	Swinney Recreation Center (1,989); Kansas City, MO
February 6, 1997		Youngstown State	L 59–68	8–12 (5–5)	14 – Alexander	8 – Alexander	2 – Parks, Perry, V.Smith, Richmond, Taylor, Love	Municipal Auditorium (2,548); Kansas City, MO
February 8, 1997		Buffalo	W 85–74	9–12 (6–5)	20 – Richmond	10 – Parks	5 – Parks	Municipal Auditorium (3,185); Kansas City, MO
February 10, 1997		Northeastern Illinois	W 83–70	10–12 (7–5)	17 – Alexander	10 – Parks, Alexander	5 – Perry, Richmond	Municipal Auditorium; Kansas City, MO
February 12, 1997		Chicago State	L 82–97	10–13 (7–6)	20 – Parks	9 – Mann	5 – Parks	Municipal Auditorium (1,941); Kansas City, MO
February 15, 1997		Central Connecticut State	L 67–72	10–14 (7–7)	16 – Mann	11 – Mann	7 – Richmond	Municipal Auditorium (3,702); Kansas City, MO
February 22, 1997		at Valparaiso	L 63–90	10–15 (7–8)	23 – Richmond	5 – Taylor	2 – Parks, Taylor, Love, Moulder, Strickland	Athletics–Recreation Center (4,251); Valparaiso, IN
February 24, 1997		at Western Illinois	L 62–90	10–16 (7–9)	18 – Richmond	11 – Perry	5 – Mann	Western Hall (1,741); Macomb, IL
Conference Tournament
March 2, 1997*; 2:30 PM	(5)	vs. (4) Northeastern Illinois; Quarterfinal	L 48–75	10–17	18 – Markos	8 – Perry, Mann, Moulder	2 – Richmond, Love	The MARK of the Quad Cities; Moline, IL
*Non-conference game. ^{#}Rankings from AP Poll. (#) Tournament seedings in parentheses. All times are in Central Standard Time (CST).

Source
NOTE: due to power outage at Municipal Auditorium, February 1 game moved to Swinney Recreation Center.
