= Luboš Bartoň =

Czech basketball coach

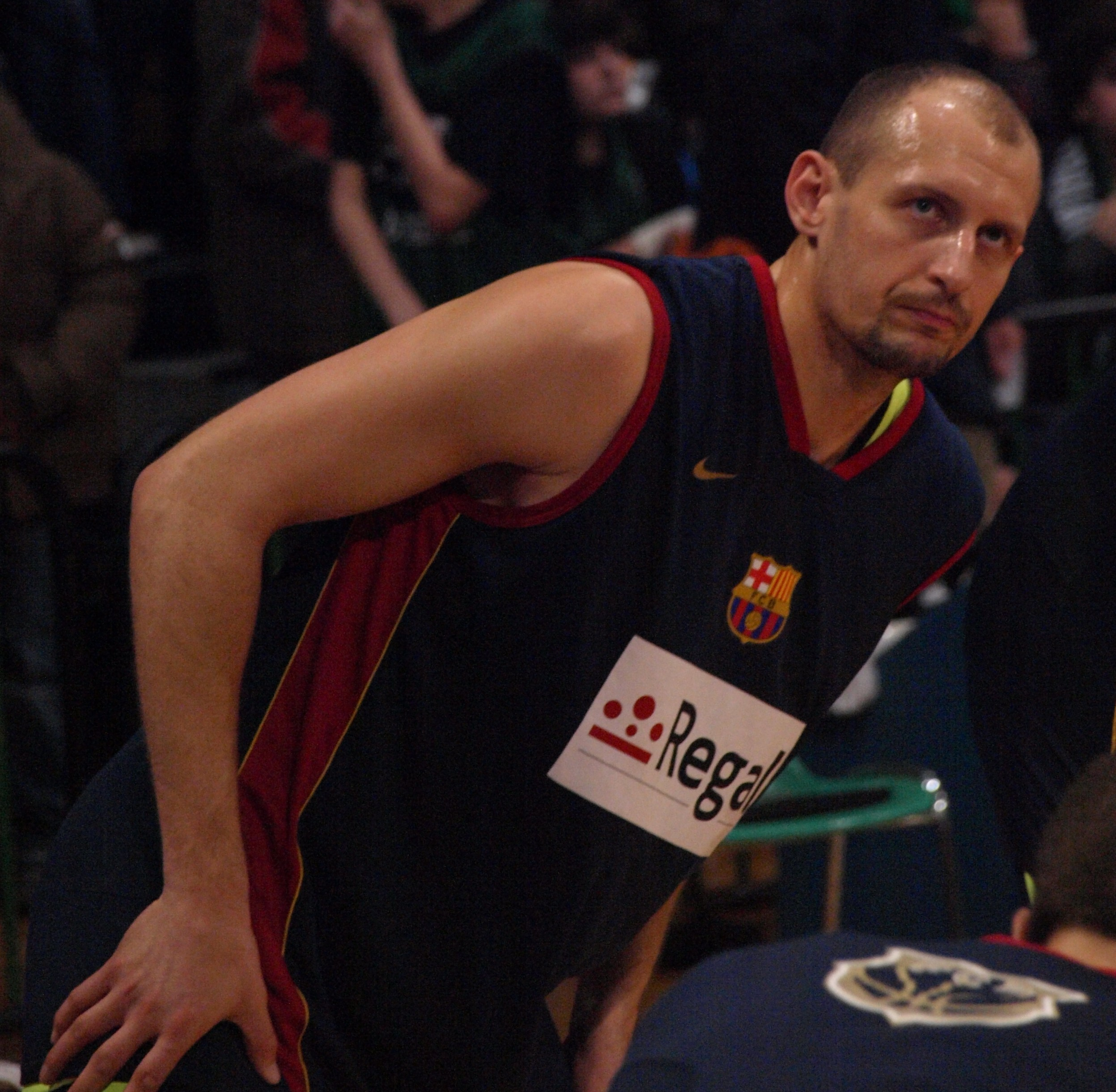
- Bartoň, as a player of FC Barcelona, in 2009.

Personal information
- Born: 7 April 1980 (age 46) Česká Lípa, Czechoslovakia
- Listed height: 6 ft 7.5 in (2.02 m)
- Listed weight: 230 lb (104 kg)

Career information
- College: Valparaiso (1998–2002)
- NBA draft: 2002: undrafted
- Playing career: 1996–2016
- Position: Small forward / Power forward
- Coaching career: 2016–present

Career history

Playing
- 1996–1998: SCE Děčín
- 2002–2003: Fortitudo Bologna
- 2003–2005: Virtus Roma
- 2005–2008: Joventut Badalona
- 2008–2010: FC Barcelona
- 2010–2012: Fuenlabrada
- 2012: Joventut Badalona
- 2012–2013: USK Praha
- 2013: Phantoms Braunschweig
- 2013: Děčín
- 2013–2014: Valencia
- 2014–2015: ČEZ Nymburk
- 2015–2016: FC Barcelona B

Coaching
- 2016–2018: FC Barcelona B (assistant)
- 2018–2022: Czech Republic Under-18
- 2019–2020: Baylor Bears (assistant)
- 2020–2022: Brno (Under-18)
- 2022: Czech Republic (assistant)
- 2022–2023: Girona (assistant)
- 2023: Czech Republic (Under-23)
- 2023–present: Valparaiso (assistant)
- 2025–: Czech Republic

Career highlights
- As a player: EuroLeague champion (2010); FIBA European Selection Team (1998); ULEB Cup champion (2008); FIBA EuroCup champion (2006); Spanish League champion (2009); 2× Spanish Cup winner (2008, 2010); Spanish Supercup winner (2009); Czech League champion (2015); Czech League All Star (1998); 2× Catalan League champion (2005, 2007); 3× MCC Champion (1999, 2001, 2002); MCC Player of the Year (2002); AP Honorable Mention All-American (2002); 2× First-team All-MCC (1999, 2002); 2× Second-team All-MCC (2000, 2001); MCC Newcomer of the Year (1999); MCC All-Freshman Team (1999); 3× MCC Tournament champion (1999, 2000, 2002); MCC Tournament MVP (2000); 3× All-MCC Tournament Team (1999, 2000, 2001); Valparaiso Athletics Hall of Fame (2017)
Medals
Men's basketball
Head Coach for Czech Republic
Summer World University Games
Gold medal – first place	2023 China	Under-23

Luboš Bartoň (born 7 April 1980) is a Czech former professional basketball player and coach. During his pro club career, at a height of 2.02 m tall, he played at the small forward position. As a player, he was a member of the FIBA European Selection Team in 1998, and he won the EuroLeague championship in 2010.

== College career ==
Bartoň played college basketball at Valparaiso University, with the Valparaiso Crusaders, from 1998 to 2002. During his college career, he won three Mid-Continent Conference championships, in the years 1999, 2001, and 2002, and three Mid-Continent Conference Tournament championships, in the years 1999, 2000, and 2002.

On an individual level, as a freshman, Bartoň made the Mid-Continent Conference All-Freshman Team, and he was named the Mid-Continent Conference Newcomer of the Year, in 1999. In 2002, as a senior, Bartoň was named the Mid-Continent Conference Player of the Year, and he was an Honorable Mention selection by the Associated Press, for the 2002 All-American Team. He was also a four-time All-Mid-Continent Conference Team selection. He was a two-time first team selection, in 1999 and 2002, as well as a two-time second team selection, in the years 2000 and 2001.

Bartoň was also a three-time All-Mid-Continent Conference Tournament Team selection, in the years 1999, 2000, and 2001, and he was also named the Mid-Continent Conference Tournament MVP in 2000.

Bartoň was inducted into the Valparaiso Athletics Hall of Fame in the years 2017.

== Professional career ==
Bartoň grew up playing youth system basketball with the SCE Decin youth teams. Prior to playing college basketball in the United States, Bartoň made his debut at the senior men's club level with SCE Decin, during the 1996–97 season. After spending two seasons with SCE Decin, he moved to the US, to play four years of college basketball in the NCAA Division I.

After he left college, Bartoň played in the 2002 Rocky Mountain Revue NBA Summer League, with the summer league squad of the NBA's Cleveland Cavaliers. He then moved to Italy, for the 2002–03 season, to play professional basketball with the Italian A League club Fortitudo Bologna. After that, he joined the Italian club Virtus Roma, for the 2003–04 season.

He then moved to Spain for the 2005–06 season, where he joined the Spanish ACB League club Joventut Badalona. After three seasons with Badalona, he moved to the Spanish club FC Barcelona, in 2008. In August 2010, he then moved to the Spanish club Fuenlabrada, after he signed a two-year deal with the club.

Barton finished his professional playing career in the Spanish second division with FC Barcelona B, the reserve team of FC Barcelona.

== National team career ==
=== Czech Republic junior national team ===
Bartoň was a member of the junior national teams of the Czech Republic. With the Czech Republic's Under-20 junior national team, he played at the 2000 FIBA Europe Under-20 Championship.

=== Czech Republic senior national team ===
Bartoň was also a member of the senior men's Czech Republic national team. Bartoň represented the Czech Republic's senior national team at the following major FIBA tournaments: the 1999 FIBA EuroBasket, the 2007 FIBA EuroBasket, the 2013 FIBA EuroBasket, and the 2015 FIBA EuroBasket. At the 1999 FIBA EuroBasket, Bartoň was the second best scorer of the tournament, with a scoring average of 18.7 points per game, and he also led the tournament in steals, with an average of 2.0 per game.

== Coaching career ==
On 3 October 2016, Bartoň retired from professional basketball, and he decided to start a new career as a basketball coach. On 13 July 2022, Bartoň became an assistant coach of the Spanish ACB League club Girona, for the 2022–23 season.

== Career statistics ==
Legend
GP	Games played	GS	Games started	MPG	Minutes per game
FG%	Field-goal percentage	3P%	3-point field-goal percentage	FT%	Free-throw percentage
RPG	Rebounds per game	APG	Assists per game	SPG	Steals per game
BPG	Blocks per game	PPG	Points per game	PIR	Performance index rating
**Bold**	Career high

=== EuroLeague ===
†	Denotes season in which Bartoň won the EuroLeague
*	Led the league

Year	Team	GP	GS	MPG	FG%	3P%	FT%	RPG	APG	SPG	BPG	PPG	PIR
2002–03	Fortitudo Bologna	19	**10**	22.4	.496	**.358**	**.892**	4.5	.8	.9	.2	9.8	**11.3**
2003–04	Roma	13	9	**25.4**	.438	.322	.714	4.8	.7	1.1	.4	9.7	9.2
2006–07	Badalona	13	10	24.4	.397	.344	.750	**4.8**	**1.5**	**1.8**	**.6**	**11.2**	11.2
2008–09	Barcelona	**23***	9	13.8	.529	.325	.800	2.5	.6	.7	.2	4.1	5.7
2009–10†	Barcelona	1	0	4.0	**.667**	.000	—	—	—	—	—	4.0	3.0
Career		69	38	20.2	.459	.336	.802	3.9	.8	1.0	.3	8.1	8.9
