= Kareem Abdul-Jabbar Jr. =

American actor, basketball player (born 1976)

Personal information
- Born: 1976 (age 49–50)
- Listed height: 6 ft 6 in (1.98 m)
- Listed weight: 200 lb (91 kg)

Career information
- High school: Brentwood (Los Angeles, California, U.S.)
- College: Valparaiso (1995–1996); SMC (1996–1997); Western Kentucky (1997–1999)
- Playing career: 1999–2011
- Position: Forward

Career history
- 1999–2000: St. Louis Swarm
- 2000–2001: Saskatchewan Hawks
- 2002: Brooklyn Kings
- 2002: Chiqumula
- 2004: Los Angeles Stars
- 2006: Brooklyn Kings
- 2011: Santa Barbara Breakers

Career highlights
- IBL champion (2000); First-team All-WSC-South (1997)

Kareem Abdul-Jabbar Jr. (born 1976) is an American actor and a former basketball player. He played college basketball for Valparaiso and Western Kentucky.

== Basketball career ==
In high school, Abdul-Jabbar Jr. played for Brentwood. He started his college career with Valparaiso in 1994 but redshirted his first year. After getting limited opportunities with Valparaiso, he transferred to Santa Monica College in 1996, where he averaged 13.6 points and 7.5 rebounds. After one season, he transferred to Western Kentucky where he finished out his college career in 1999.

Following his college career, he was drafted 76th overall by the Los Angeles Stars of the new American Basketball Association. In 2003, he played for the Los Angeles Lakers summer league team. He played professionally for several years, including in the ABA, the IBL and the USBL.

== Acting career ==
As an actor, he has appeared in Nick Cannon Presents: Short Circuitz, Half & Half and The Sarah Silverman Program.

== Personal life ==
He is the son of former NBA player Kareem Abdul-Jabbar.
