= 2002 Mid-Continent Conference men's basketball tournament =

- Classification: Division I
- Season: 2001–02
- Teams: 8
- Site: Allen County War Memorial Coliseum; Fort Wayne, Indiana
- Champions: Valparaiso (7th title)
- Winning coach: Homer Drew (7th title)
- MVP: Milo Stovall (Valparaiso)
- Mid-Continent Conference men's basketball tournaments

2001–02 Mid-Continent Conference men's basketball standings
| | Conf. | | | | Overall |
| Team | W | | L | PCT | W | | L | PCT |
|---|---|---|---|---|---|---|---|---|
| Valparaiso † | 12 | – | 2 | .857 | 25 | – | 8 | .758 |
| Oral Roberts | 10 | – | 4 | .714 | 17 | – | 14 | .548 |
| Oakland | 10 | – | 4 | .714 | 17 | – | 13 | .567 |
| Southern Utah | 8 | – | 6 | .571 | 11 | – | 16 | .407 |
| UMKC | 7 | – | 7 | .500 | 18 | – | 11 | .621 |
| IUPUI | 6 | – | 8 | .429 | 15 | – | 15 | .500 |
| Western Illinois | 3 | – | 11 | .214 | 12 | – | 16 | .429 |
| Chicago State | 0 | – | 14 | .000 | 2 | – | 26 | .071 |
† 2002 Mid-Con Tournament winner Rankings from AP Poll

The 2002 Mid-Continent Conference men's basketball tournament was held March 3–5, 2002, at Allen County War Memorial Coliseum in Fort Wayne, Indiana.

Valparaiso defeated IUPUI in the title game, 88–55, to win their seventh AMCU/Mid-Con/Summit League championship. The Crusaders earned an automatic bid to the 2002 NCAA tournament as the #13 seed in the East region.

== Format ==
All eight conference members qualified for the tournament. First round seedings were based on regular season record.

== Bracket ==
Quarterfinals; March 4
1 | Valparaiso | 81
8 | Chicago State | 50
4 | Southern Utah | 57
5 | UMKC | 70
2 | Oral Roberts | 86
7 | Western Illinois | 75
3 | Oakland | 84
6 | IUPUI | 90

Semifinals; March 5
1 | Valparaiso | 71
5 | UMKC | 58
2 | Oral Roberts | 53
6 | IUPUI | 58

Final; March 6
1 | Valparaiso | 88
6 | IUPUI | 55
