= Homer Drew =

American basketball coach (born 1944)

Biographical details
- Born: September 29, 1944 (age 82); St. Louis, Missouri, U.S.

Playing career
- 1962–1966: William Jewell

Coaching career (HC unless noted)
- 1971–1972: Washington State (assistant)
- 1972–1976: LSU (assistant)
- 1976–1987: Bethel (IN)
- 1987–1988: Indiana–South Bend
- 1988–2002: Valparaiso
- 2003–2011: Valparaiso

Administrative career (AD unless noted)
- 2011–2015: Valparaiso (associate AD)

Head coaching record
- Overall: 640–428

Accomplishments and honors

Championships
- 8 Mid-Con regular season (1995–1999, 2001, 2002, 2004); 8 Mid-Con tournament (1995–2000, 2002, 2004)

Awards
- 4× Mid-Con Coach of the Year (1994–1996, 2002); Coach Wooden "Keys to Life" Award (2012)
- College Basketball Hall of Fame; Inducted in 2019

Homer Walter Drew Jr. (born September 29, 1944) is an American former college basketball coach and administrator who coached at Washington State, LSU, Bethel College, Indiana-South Bend, and Valparaiso. He retired from college basketball in 2011 with 640 career wins, which ranked him sixth amongst all Division I coaches at the time of his retirement. Drew was inducted into the College Basketball Hall of Fame in 2019.

Drew made 10 National Tournament appearances and seven NCAA tournament appearances in his career.

Drew put Valparaiso and its men's basketball program on the map over the course of his 22 years at the helm of the Crusaders with his “Building a Tradition” philosophy, which reached new heights in 1998 as Valparaiso advanced to the Sweet Sixteen of the NCAA tournament for the first time in program history. He amassed 371 coaching victories with the Crusaders, eight conference regular-season titles, eight conference tournament titles, nine postseason appearances, three postseason victories, faced the number one team in the nation in six of his last seven years as head coach, while also sending 32 players to the pros and 80 players into teaching or coaching.

Drew's sons, Scott Drew and Bryce Drew, have both been coaches at the Division I level. Scott is the coach of the Baylor Bears men's basketball team, where he has served as head coach since 2003, while Bryce is the head coach at Grand Canyon University. Both Scott and Bryce were also head coaches at Valparaiso, with Scott leading the Crusader program in 2002–03 and Bryce from 2011 to 2016.

== Early career ==
A native of St. Louis, Missouri, he achieved his Bachelor of Arts in physical education and social studies at William Jewell College in 1966 before completing his Master of Arts in education at Washington University in St. Louis in 1968. Drew then earned a Doctorate in educational administration from Andrews University in Berrien Springs, Michigan in 1983.

== Valpo career ==
In 1988, Drew moved to Valparaiso University. Valpo was a model of consistency under Drew, winning both the Mid-Continent Conference regular season and tournament titles five straight seasons from 1994 to 1999, and again in the 2001–02 season. In 1999–2000, he led the Crusaders to their sixth consecutive conference tournament title, and in 2000–01 to another regular season title. This continuous success helped Drew achieve conference Coach of the Year honors three consecutive seasons, from 1993 to 1996.

Drew led the Crusaders to five consecutive NCAA Tournaments from 1995 to 2000—the Crusaders' first postseason appearances as a Division I team. The pinnacle of Drew's coaching career came during the 1998 NCAA Tournament. In the Midwest Region, 13-seed Valparaiso was facing 4-seed Ole Miss in the first round. Valparaiso was down 69–67 with 4.1 seconds remaining in the game, and Mississippi's Ansu Sesay at the free throw line. After he missed both shots, the Crusaders came up with possession—94 feet from their basket, and with only 2.5 seconds remaining in the game. On the inbound, Drew called the play known as Pacer. Jamie Sykes inbounded a long throw to Bill Jenkins, who drew two defenders and quickly passed the ball to Drew's son, Bryce Drew. Then, as time expired, Bryce released a 23-foot three-point shot, clinching the Crusaders' 70–69 upset and advancing them in the tournament. The Crusaders proceeded to defeat 12-seeded Florida State University 83–77 in overtime. However, the Crusaders finally fell to 8-seeded University of Rhode Island by a score of 74–68—the deepest run a Mid-Continent/Summit League team made in the NCAA Tournament since Cleveland State's run in 1986.

After coaching for another four seasons, Drew retired at the end of the 2001–02 season and took a post as Special Assistant to the President for University Advancement. As of February 21, 2002, Drew had become one of only 19 active Division I coaches to earn his 500th career victory and mounted a 26-season career record of 505–306, a winning percentage of 62.3. This made him the winningest coach in Valpo history, with a 236–184 record there. Drew is nominated to become one of Valparaiso University's 150 Most Influential Persons in the university's history.

For the 2002–03 season, Drew's son Scott took the head coach position, but then left after one year to become the head coach at Baylor. Homer Drew was rehired as head coach for Valparaiso's men's basketball team in August 2003, and led the Crusaders back to the NCAA tournament in 2004.

On May 17, 2011, Homer Drew stepped down as the head basketball coach and was succeeded by his son Bryce Drew. Having earned 640 career coaching wins (including 371 at Valparaiso), Drew remained with Valparaiso as associate athletic director. On October 12, 2011, in a shocking announcement before the 2011–12 collegiate season, Homer Drew announced that he and his wife were both diagnosed with cancer. His son Bryce Drew wore a light blue blazer the color symbolizing the fight against prostate cancer in his first regular season game versus the Arizona Wildcats to honor his father and the team publicly dedicated their season to their former coach and his wife.

== Head coaching record ==
Record table
Season	Team	Overall	Conference	Standing	Postseason
Bethel Pilots (1976–1981)
1976–77	Bethel	19–11			NAIA District; NCCAA National Tourney 1st Round
1977–78	Bethel	24–7			
1978–79	Bethel	22–13			
1979–80	Bethel	23–10			
1980–81	Bethel	27–10			
Bethel Pilots (Crossroads League) (1981–1987)
1981–82	Bethel	28–6	6–2		
1982–83	Bethel	23–7	5–3		
1983–84	Bethel	18–13	4–4		
1984–85	Bethel	25–10	5–3		
1985–86	Bethel	18–14	4–4		
1986–87	Bethel	25–9	4–4		
Bethel:		252–110	28–20		
Indiana–South Bend Titans (1987–1988)
1987–88	Indiana–South Bend	17–12			
Indiana–South Bend:		17–12			
Valparaiso Crusaders (Mid-Continent Conference) (1988–2002)
1988–89	Valparaiso	10–19	4–8	T–5th	
1989–90	Valparaiso	4–24	1–11	7th	
1990–91	Valparaiso	5–22	2–14	9th	
1991–92	Valparaiso	5–22	2–14	9th	
1992–93	Valparaiso	12–16	7–9	T–6th	
1993–94	Valparaiso	20–8	14–4	T–2nd	
1994–95	Valparaiso	20–8	14–4	1st	
1995–96	Valparaiso	22–10	13–5	1st	NCAA Division I First Round
1996–97	Valparaiso	24–7	13–3	1st	NCAA Division I First Round
1997–98	Valparaiso	23–10	13–3	1st	NCAA Division I Sweet 16
1998–99	Valparaiso	23–10	10–4	T–1st	NCAA Division I First Round
1999–00	Valparaiso	19–13	10–6	T–2nd	NCAA Division I First Round
2000–01	Valparaiso	24–8	13–3	T–1st	
2001–02	Valparaiso	25–8	12–2	1st	NCAA Division I First Round
Valparaiso Crusaders (Mid–Continent Conference) (2003–2007)
2003–04	Valparaiso	18–13	11–5	1st	NCAA Division I First Round
2004–05	Valparaiso	15–16	10–6	3rd	
2005–06	Valparaiso	17–12	8–8	T–4th	
2006–07	Valparaiso	16–15	9–5	3rd	
Valparaiso Crusaders (Horizon League) (2007–2011)
2007–08	Valparaiso	22–14	9–9	T–4th	CBI Second Round
2008–09	Valparaiso	9–22	5–13	9th	
2009–10	Valparaiso	15–17	10–8	T–4th	
2010–11	Valparaiso	23–12	12–6	4th	CIT First Round
Valparaiso:		371–304	202–150		
Total:		640–428			
National champion Postseason invitational champion Conference regular season champion Conference regular season and conference tournament champion Division regular season champion Division regular season and conference tournament champion Conference tournament champion

== See also ==
- List of college men's basketball coaches with 600 wins
