= Piatra Neamț =

- Municipality
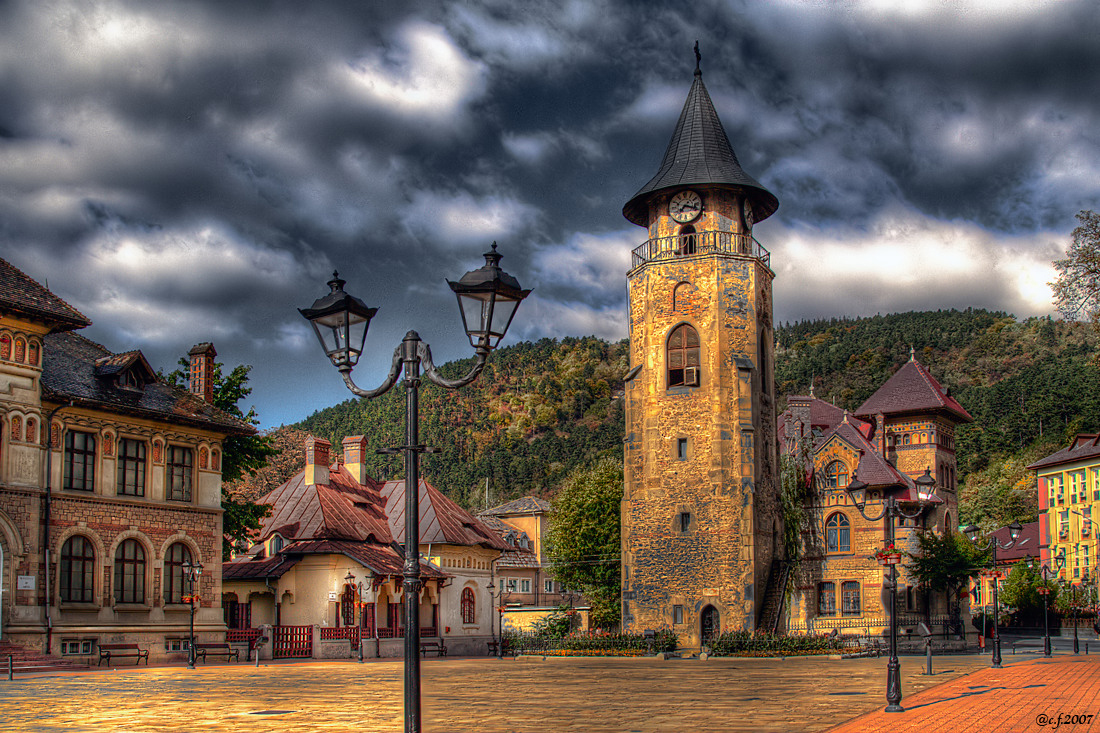
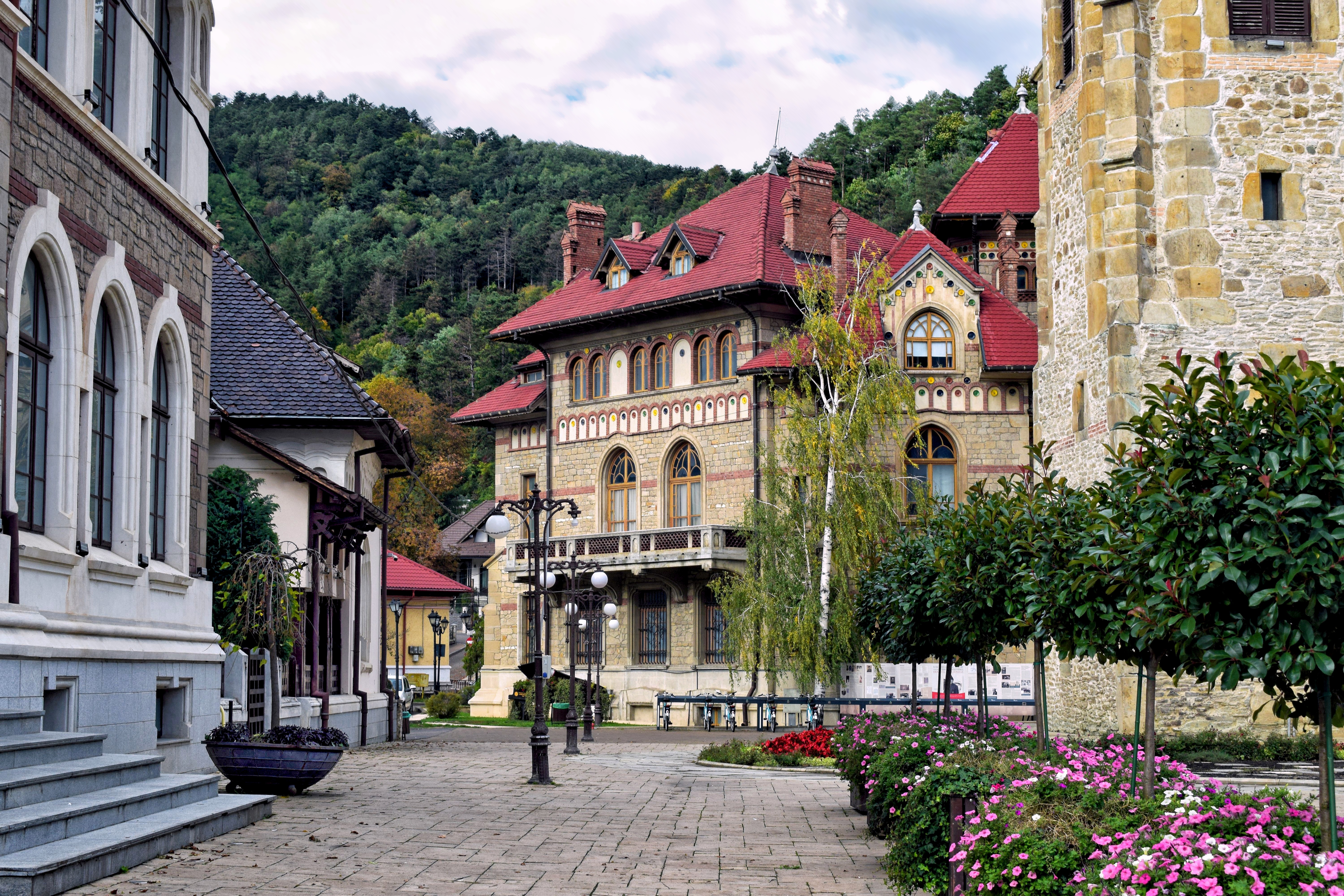
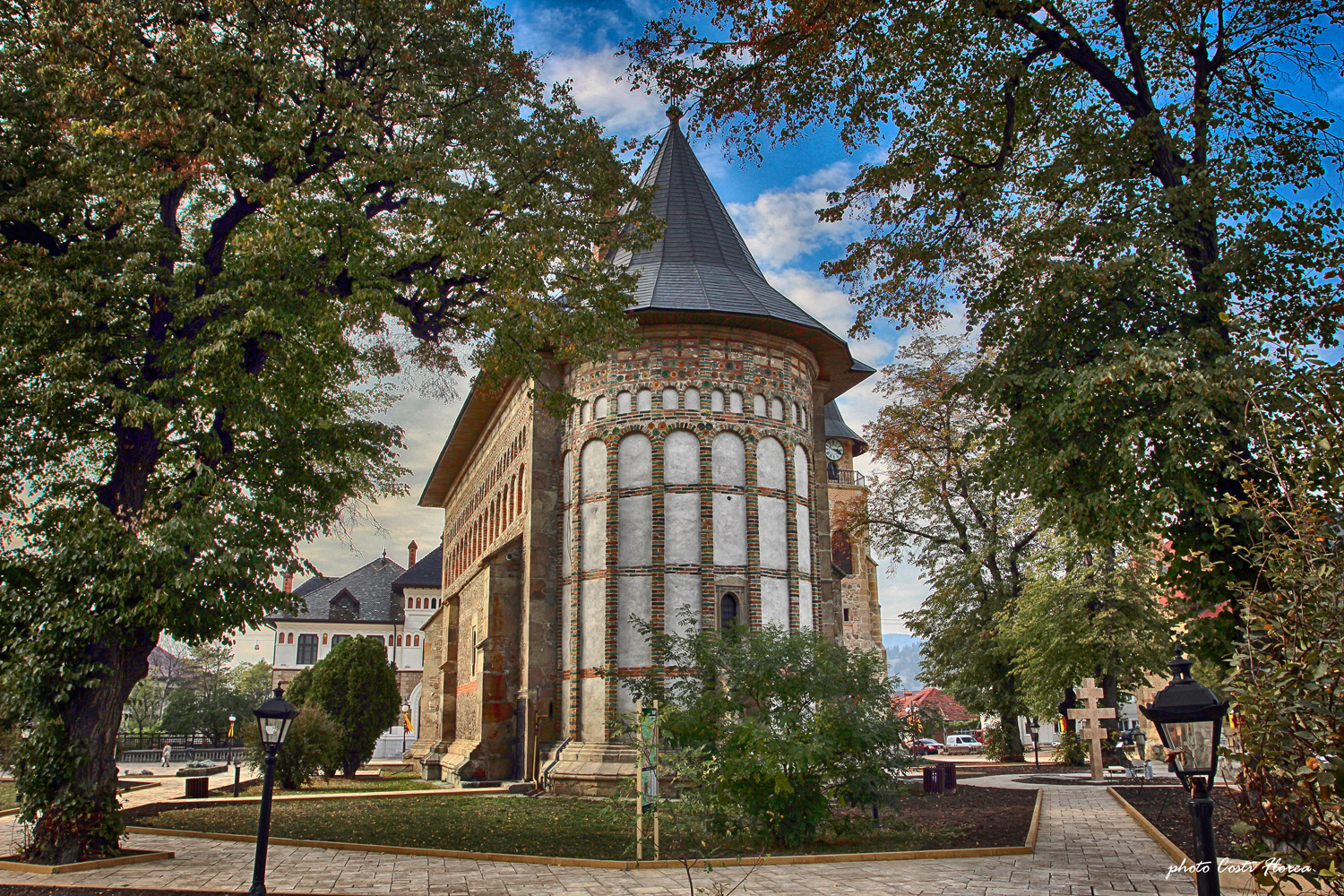
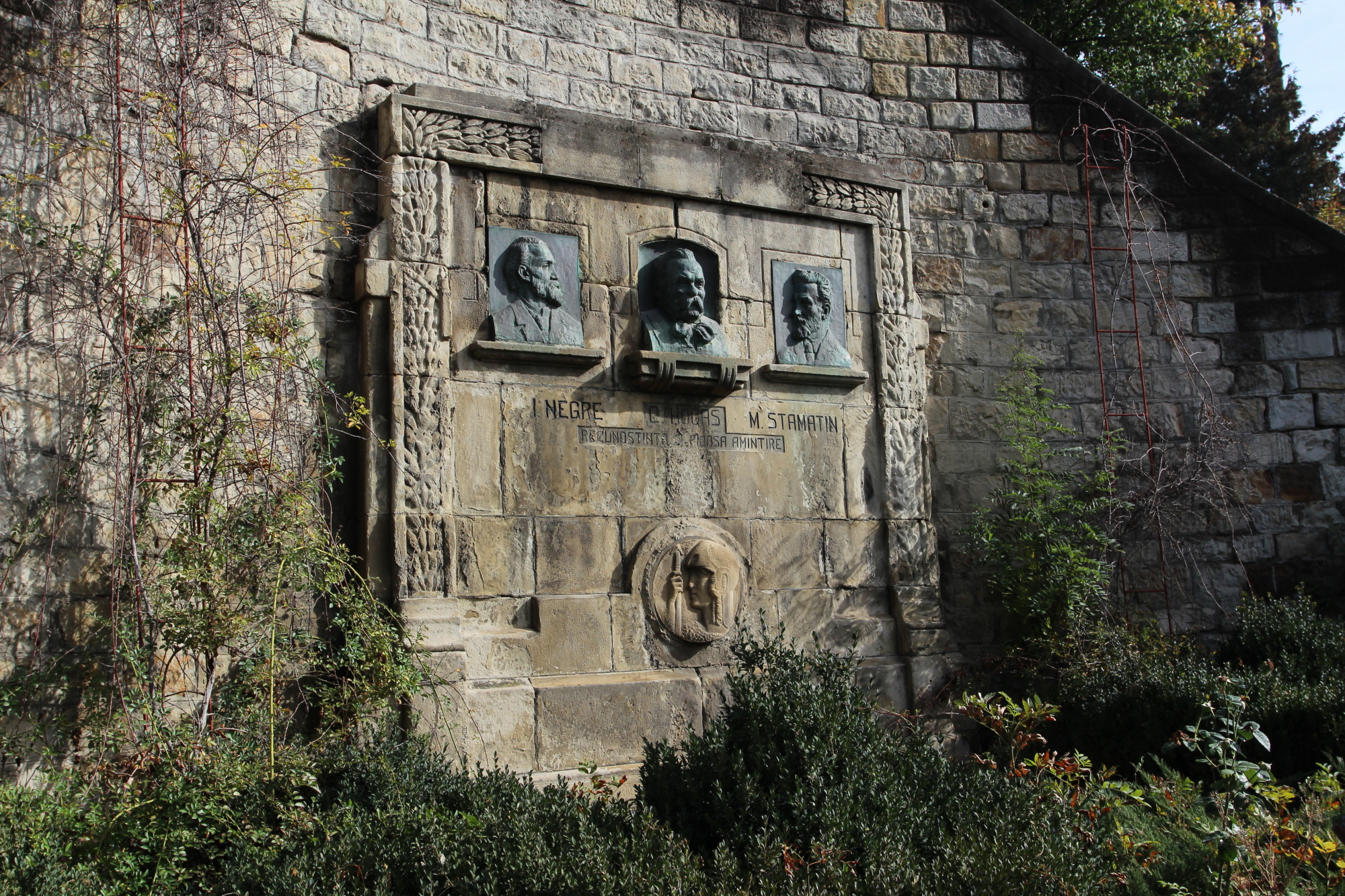
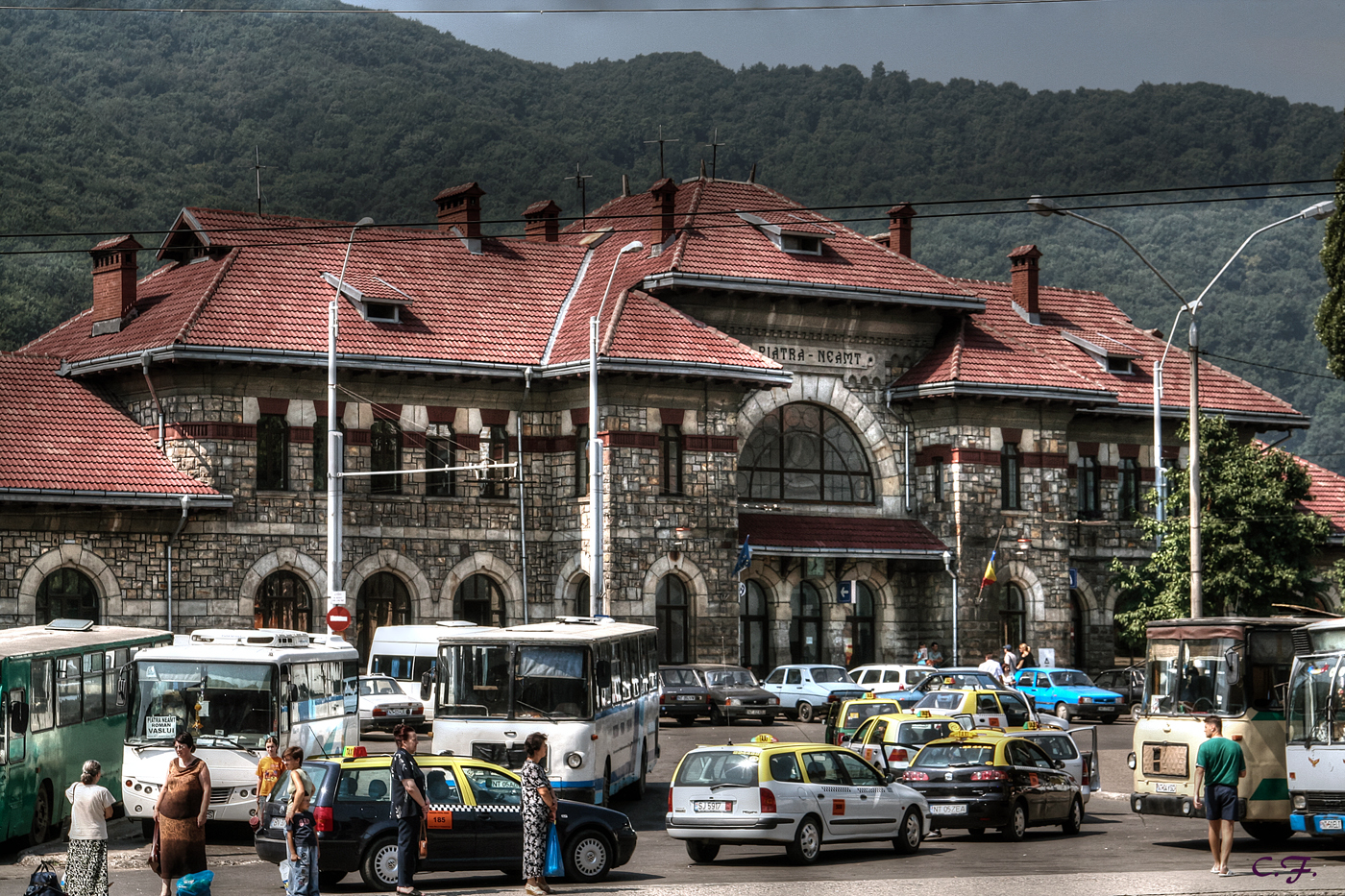
- 15th-century Stephen's Tower (the city symbol) in the medieval town square Cucuteni Museum St. John Church Monument of I. Negre, C. Hogaș, M. Stamatin The CFR railway station

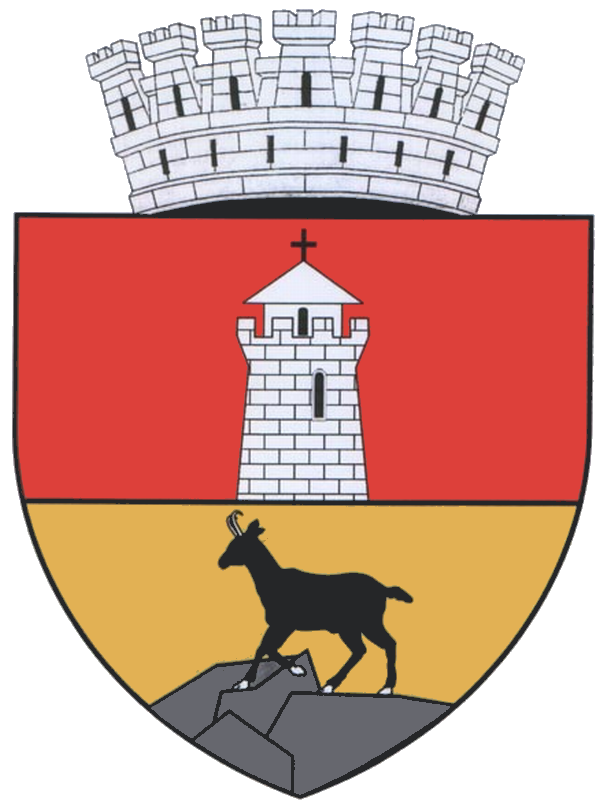
- Coat of arms

- Location in Neamț County

- Location in Romania
- Coordinates: 46°55′39″N 26°22′15″E
- Country: Romania
- County: Neamț

Government
  - Mayor (2024–2028): Vasile-Adrian Niță (PSD)
- Area: 77.4 km^{2} (29.9 sq mi)
- Elevation: 345 m (1,132 ft)
- Population (2021-12-01): 79,679
  - Density: 1,030/km^{2} (2,670/sq mi)
- Time zone: UTC+02:00 (EET)
  - Summer (DST): UTC+03:00 (EEST)
- Postal code: 610004–610292
- Area code: (+40) 0233
- Vehicle reg.: NT
- Website: www.primariapn.ro

Piatra Neamț (Romanian: [ˈpjatra ˈne̯amt͡s] is the capital city of Neamț County, in the historical region of Western Moldavia, in northeastern Romania. Because of its very privileged location in the Eastern Carpathian Mountains, it is considered one of the most picturesque cities in Romania. The Nord-Est Regional Development Agency is located in Piatra Neamț.

== Etymology ==
The toponym piatra (meaning 'rock') was always part of the settlement's name throughout its history. It is also called Piatra lui Crăciun ('Christmas Rock', thus also corresponding to the Hungarian name of the city, "Karácson-Kő"). It is also simply called Piatra, to which the county name Neamț (meaning 'German') was added.

== Geography and access ==
Piatra Neamț lies in the Bistrița River valley, surrounded by mountains — Pietricica (530 m), Cozla (679 m), Cernegura (852 m), Bâtca Doamnei (462 m) and Cârloman (617 m) — at an average height of 345 m (1,131.89 ft). The river Doamna is a right tributary of the Bistrița; it flows into the Bâtca Doamnei Reservoir near Piatra Neamț.

The city is located 350 kilometres (217 miles) north of Bucharest, in the historical region of Moldavia. The nearest airport is Bacău, situated 60 km (37 miles) south. Piatra Neamț is linked by Romanian railways trunk number 509 to Bacău (and from there by Line 500 to Bucharest), and by DN15 national road to Bacău (and from there by DN2 to Bucharest), Iași, Suceava, and Târgu Mureș in the Transylvania region.

Map of Piatra Neamț

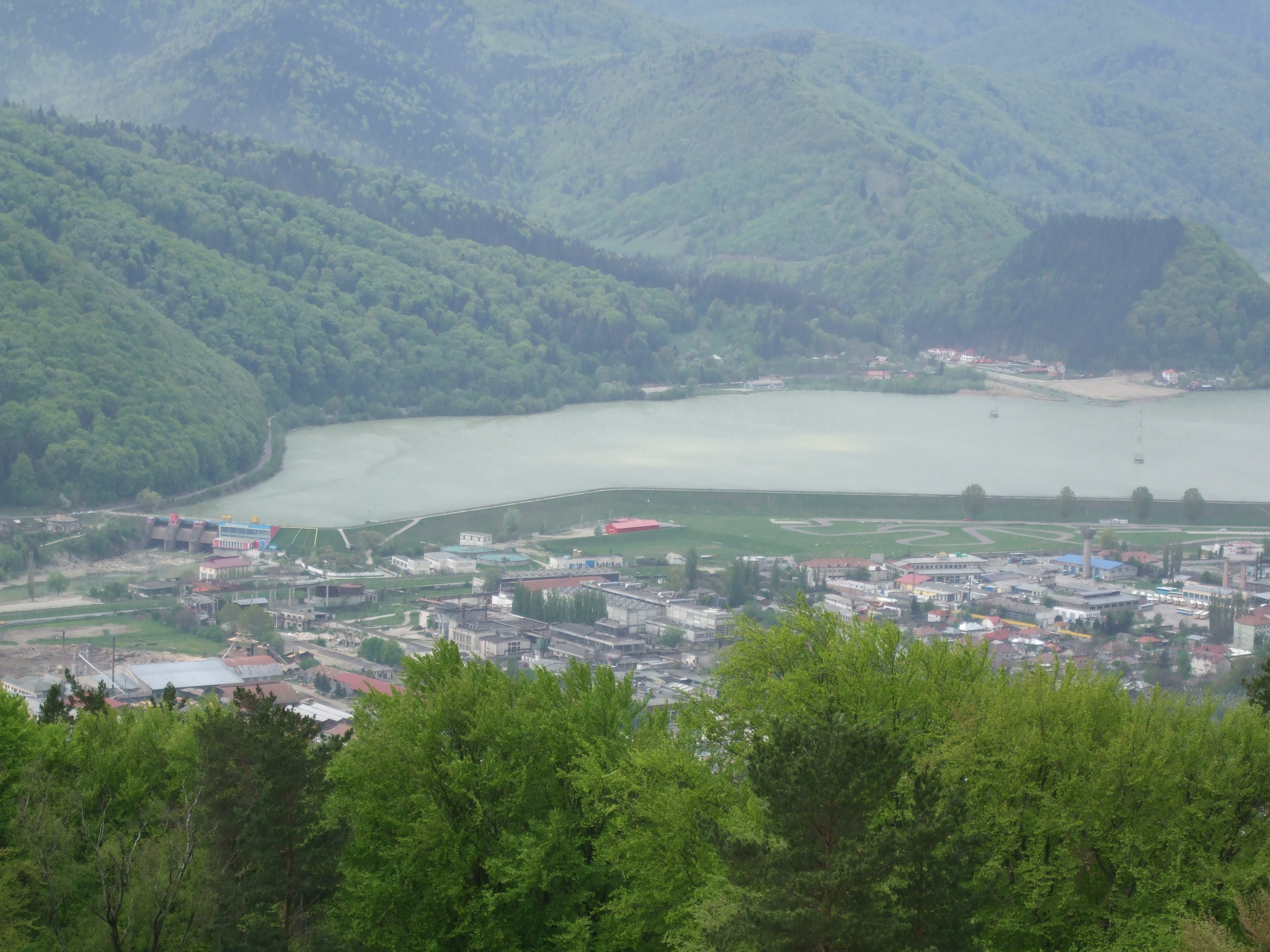
Bâtca Doamnei Reservoir

The city is informally divided in several districts (in Romanian: cartiere):

- 1 Mai
- Băcioaia
- Centru
- Ciritei
- Dărmănești
- Doamna
- Gara Veche
- Mărăței
- Precista
- Sarata
- Speranța
- Valea Viei
- Văleni
- Vânători

Of these, Ciritei, Doamna, and Văleni are formally separate villages administered by the municipality. There are plans to build two new districts, the larger of which will be on the site of the former Reconstrucția factory.

== History ==
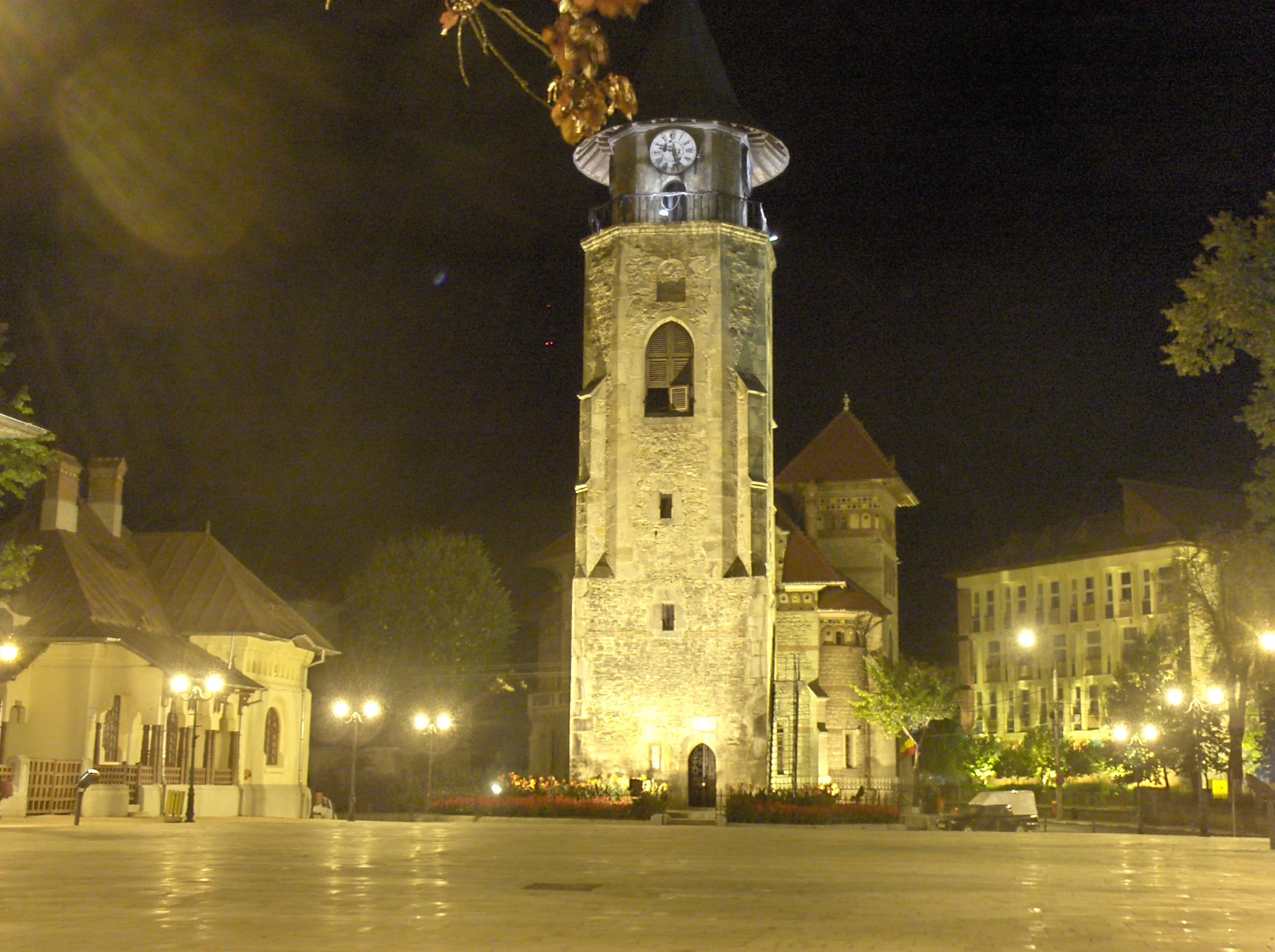
Stephen's Tower built in 1499

The area around Piatra Neamț is one of the oldest inhabited areas in Romania. The oldest traces of human civilisation in the present territory date back to the higher Paleolithic, about 100,000 years BCE. The Cucuteni culture, whose development lasted approximately one thousand years (c. 3600–2600 BCE) was attested in the territory of Neamţ county by a remarkable number of settlements (approx. 150), archaeological diggings unearthing important museum collections of Aeneolithic artifacts. Archaeologists have also discovered objects here dating back to the Neolithic Period and the Bronze Age (about 1900–1700 BCE).

Excavations just outside the city revealed the ruins of a large Dacian city, Petrodava, mentioned by Greek geographer Ptolemy in the 2nd century. The whole compound had its heyday between the first century BCE and the first century CE. Standing out is the citadel at Bâtca Doamnei which contains shrines resembling those identified in the Orăștie Mountains. As far as the existence of a local leader is concerned, historians tend to suggest the identification of the Kingdom of Dicomes in the very political centre at Petrodava. The complex of strongholds without peer in Moldavia and Wallachia is evidence as to a powerful political and military centre both in Burebista’s time and in the period that preceded the reign of Decebalus. The settlement was documented in the 15th century as Piatra lui Crăciun, or Camena, a market town.

The first urban settlements, which emerged under Petru I Mușat (1375–1391), were Piatra lui Crăciun, Roman, and Neamț. The Neamț citadel, whose documentary attestation dates back to 2 February 1395, was also erected during the same consolidation period of the Moldavian principality east of the Carpathians. The Princely Court of Piatra Neamț is mentioned for the first time in a document dated 20 April 1491, to have been founded between 1468 and 1475, under Stephen the Great, the Princely Cathedral being built in 1497–1498, and the 20 m (65.62 ft) tall Bell Tower in 1499.

=== Jewish community ===
Jews have lived in Piatra Neamț for several centuries. According to local tradition, a synagogue existed by the mid-16th century, although the earliest surviving physical evidence of a Jewish presence is a tombstone dated 1627. The records of the local chevra kadisha begin in 1771. The community grew substantially during the 19th century: there were 3,900 Jews in 1859, representing about one-third of the population, and 8,489 in 1907, when Jews made up approximately half of the city's inhabitants. In 1930, Piatra Neamț had 7,595 Jewish residents, or about 24% of the population.

Jewish economic and cultural life was extensive. By the late 19th century, Jews were prominent in commerce, particularly the timber, grain and cattle trades, as well as among the city's artisans. The community maintained the Great Synagogue and numerous smaller prayer houses, some associated with particular trades. Jewish institutions included a Talmud Torah, schools for boys and girls, an old-age home and, from 1905, a Jewish hospital. A branch of Hovevei Zion was founded in 1894, and several Zionist organizations subsequently operated in the city. Piatra Neamț was also a centre of Jewish publishing; the Hebrew weekly Yizre'el and the Yiddish newspaper Di Hofnung were published there.

The community was repeatedly subjected to antisemitic violence and discrimination. In 1821, Jews were robbed and killed during the 1821 Greek revolutionary uprising in Moldavia, while a blood libel in 1841 led to the arrest of 48 Jews from surrounding villages. Antisemitism intensified during the interwar period: Jewish institutions were attacked in 1925, the cemetery was desecrated in 1926 and 1928, and in 1937 most Jewish lawyers practising in the city were removed from the bar.

During World War II, Jews in Piatra Neamț were subjected to persecution by the National Legionary State and the regime of Ion Antonescu. Beginning in 1940, local authorities and Legionnaires confiscated Jewish property and extorted money from community members. In June 1941, around 1,500 Jews were interned in camps established in Piatra Neamț, while others were sent to Târgu Jiu. Jews from surrounding villages were also forcibly concentrated in Piatra Neamț, and 21 Jews from the city were deported to Transnistria.

The Jewish community survived the war and numbered about 8,000 in 1947. It subsequently declined rapidly through emigration, particularly to Israel: approximately 5,000 Jews remained in 1950 and about 300 Jewish families in 1969. By the beginning of the 21st century, the community numbered approximately 100 people.

== Demographics ==
Historical population
| Year | Pop. | ±% |
|---|---|---|
| 1859 | 11,805 | — |
| 1899 | 17,384 | +47.3% |
| 1912 | 18,965 | +9.1% |
| 1930 | 29,827 | +57.3% |
| 1948 | 26,303 | −11.8% |
| 1956 | 32,648 | +24.1% |
| 1966 | 45,852 | +40.4% |
| 1977 | 77,812 | +69.7% |
| 1992 | 123,360 | +58.5% |
| 2002 | 104,914 | −15.0% |
| 2011 | 85,055 | −18.9% |
| 2021 | 77,393 | −9.0% |
Source: Census data

According to the 2011 census data, Piatra Neamț has a population of 85,055, a decrease from the figure recorded at the 2002 census, making it the 24th largest city in Romania. The 2002 census recorded 104,914 people living within the city of Piatra Neamț. The ethnic makeup was as follows:

- Romanians: 98.08%
- Roma: 1.3%
- Lipovans: 0.16%
- Hungarians: 0.14%
- Other: 0.32%

== Economy ==
The city's industries include a fertilizer plant, a pulp and paper mill, and several food-processing plants. In the city are also located an agricultural machinery plant (Mecanica Ceahlău), a pharmaceutical plant (Plantavorel) and two paper manufacturers.

The city's main industrial park is situated 11 km (7 mi) south, in the Săvinești area. During the communist period, the Săvinești platform was one of the most important chemical plants in Romania and the site of a research institute. Today, the industrial facility is part of the Italian company Radici Group, and it operates at low capacity.

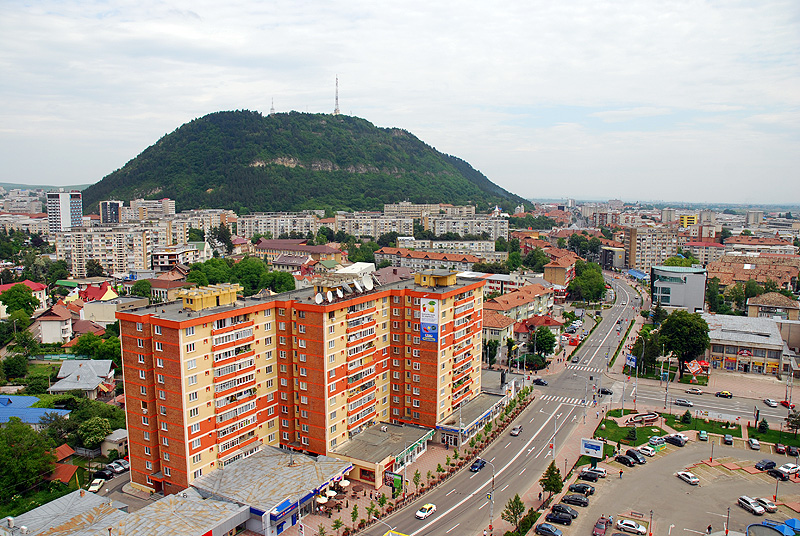
Centru district, with Pietricica Hill

In recent times, the most important Romanian commercial brands originating from Piatra Neamț are Rifil (synthetic fibers manufacturer), Altex (Media Galaxy) (TV, hi-fi, home appliances national dealer), Köber (paints manufacturer), Amicii-Kubo Ice Cream (ice cream producer) and Dasimpex (mobile phones dealer).

There are 4 local TV stations (TV M, 1TV, TeleM, Actual TV), 3 FM radio stations, and several newspapers, including online newspapers such as CityNeamț and Ziar Piatra Neamț.

== Transport ==
=== Public transport ===
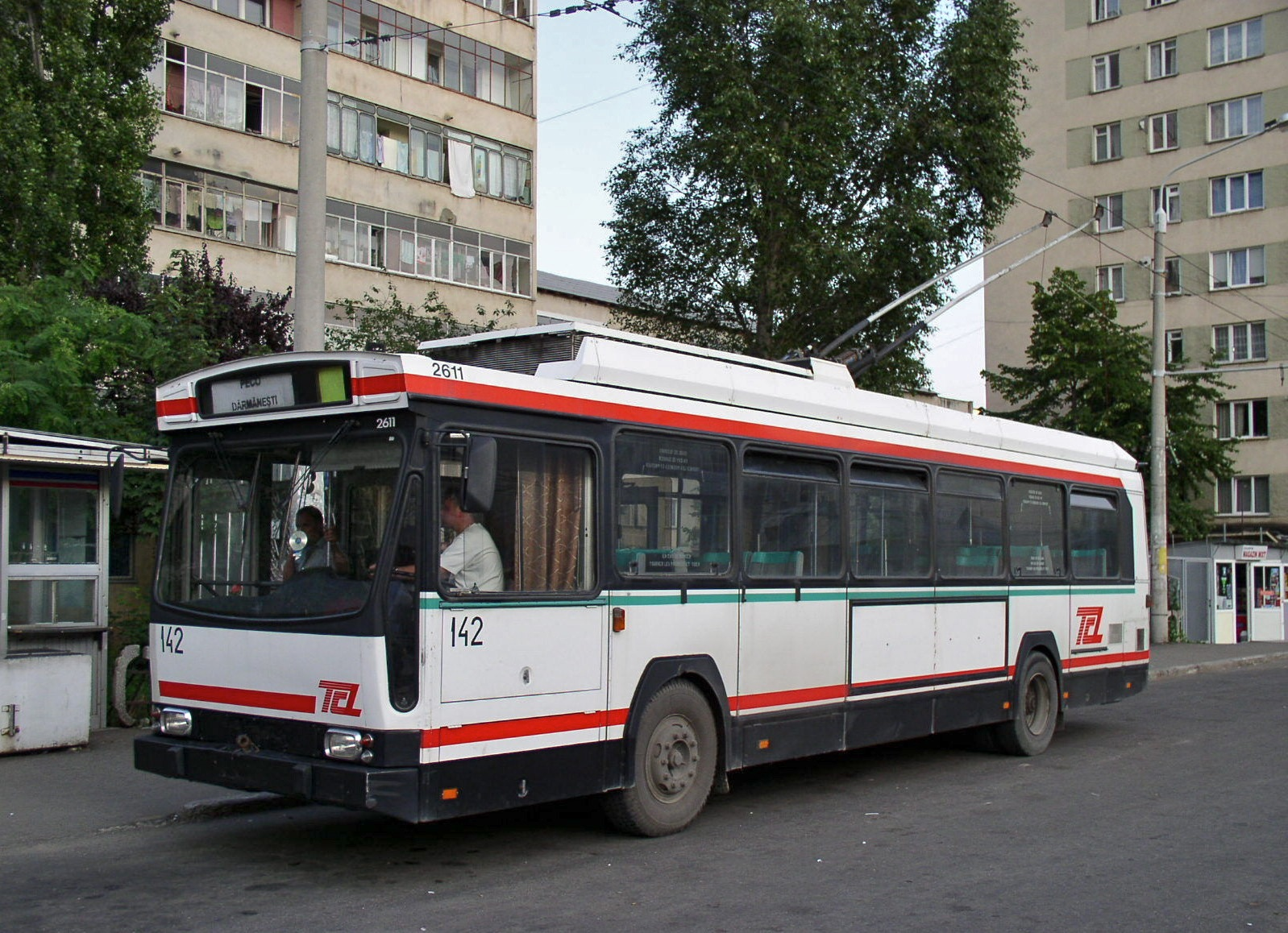
One of the trolleybuses that served the city until 2019, this being a secondhand Renault from France

Public transport in Piatra Neamț is managed mainly by S.C. Troleibuzul SA. Until 2019, the company operated both trolleybuses and motorbuses. Although the company's name still includes a reference to trolleybuses, the last trolleybus service was discontinued in September 2019, the trolleybuses were put up for sale in March 2020, and removal of the overhead trolley wires began in June 2020. The trolleybus system had opened in 1995. The company now operates only motorbuses.

- There are seven urban bus lines between the city's districts and the suburban communes of Dumbrava Roșie and Săvinești.
- There are 18 bus lines which connect the suburbs with the city centre.
- More private companies operate minibuses (of types Mercedes-Benz Sprinter, Volkswagen Crafter, Iveco Daily, and Ford Transit).

==== Taxi transport ====
Several local companies operate taxi services inside the city.

=== Rail ===
The Piatra Neamț railway station is the main train station which serves Piatra Neamț. From there arrive and depart daily, 8 Regio trains on the route Piatra Neamț — Bacău and return, 4 Regio trains on the route Bicaz - Bacau and return, an Inter Regio train Piatra Neamț - Bucharest North (attachment to a train Suceava - Bucharest North in Bacău) and a train Regio Express Bicaz — Bucharest North (attached to a train Suceava - Bucharest North in Bacău).

=== Road ===
Piatra Neamț is a road junction where DN15 intersects with DN15C and DN15D. Also, the city is served by three bus stations, where intercity bus services between the city and other major Romanian cities start and terminate.

== Culture and education ==
Piatra Neamț is home to Teatrul Tineretului (Youth's Theatre), the G. T. Kirileanu Library, and many cultural events, including the International Theatre Festival in the springtime, the classical music event Vacanțe muzicale (musical holidays) in the summertime and more folkloric festivals all year round.

The Petru Rareș National College, "Calistrat Hogaș" national college, National College of Computer Science as well as "Victor Brauner" Fine Arts College are some of the most prestigious education centres in the Neamt county.

Starting with January 2009, Piatra Neamț is the host of a short film festival called "Filmul de Piatra" (derived from the name of the city "Piatra" which means stone (rock) and translated as "Stone-film Festival"). The 1st edition took place in the building of Teatrul Tineretului and other locations between 7th and 11 January 2009. The festival has a national short film competition (all genres) and awards each category. The agenda also includes selections of international shorts, awarded in major festivals throughout the world. Other special programmes include live concerts, skiing and workshops.

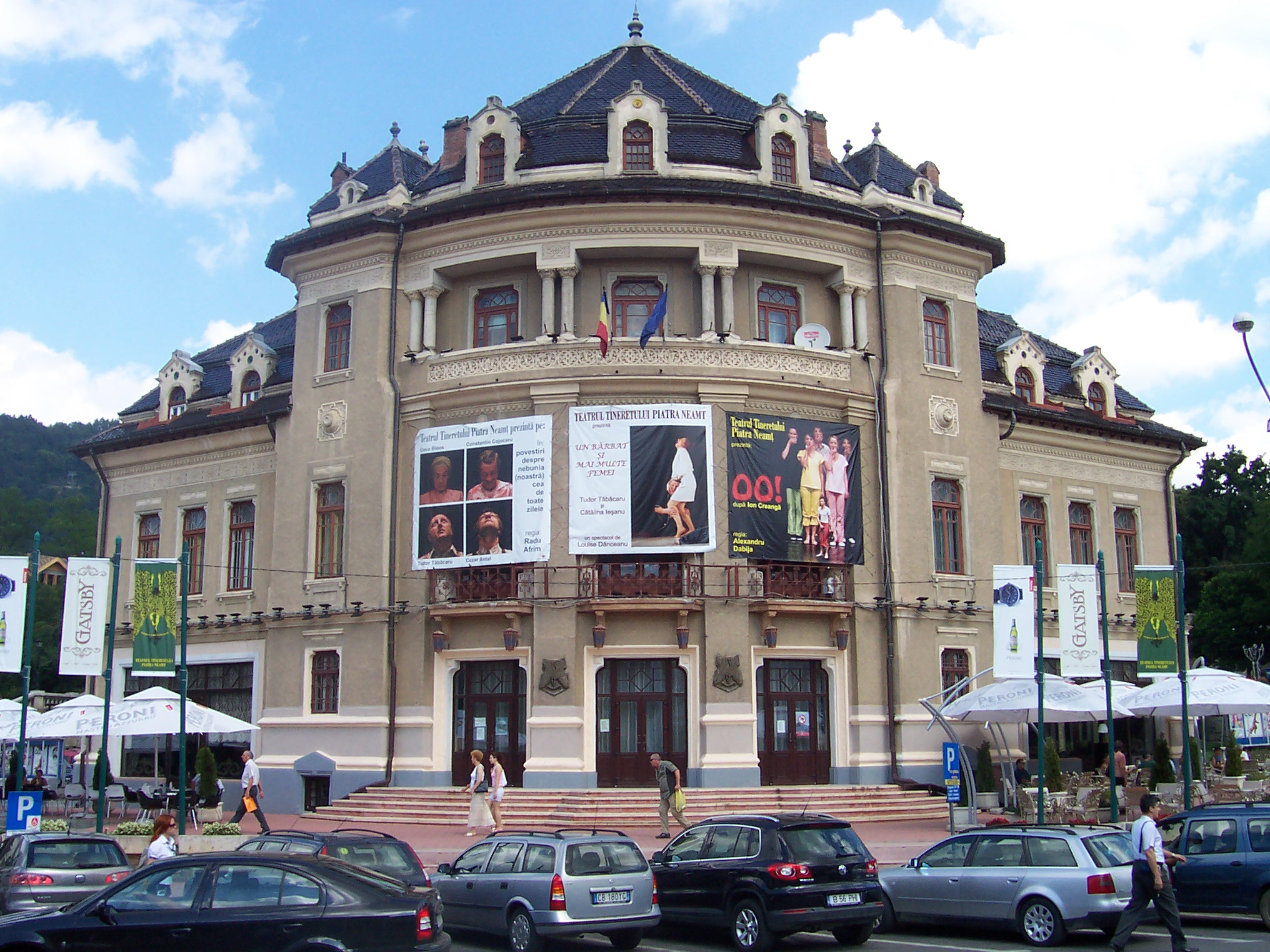
Youth's Theatre

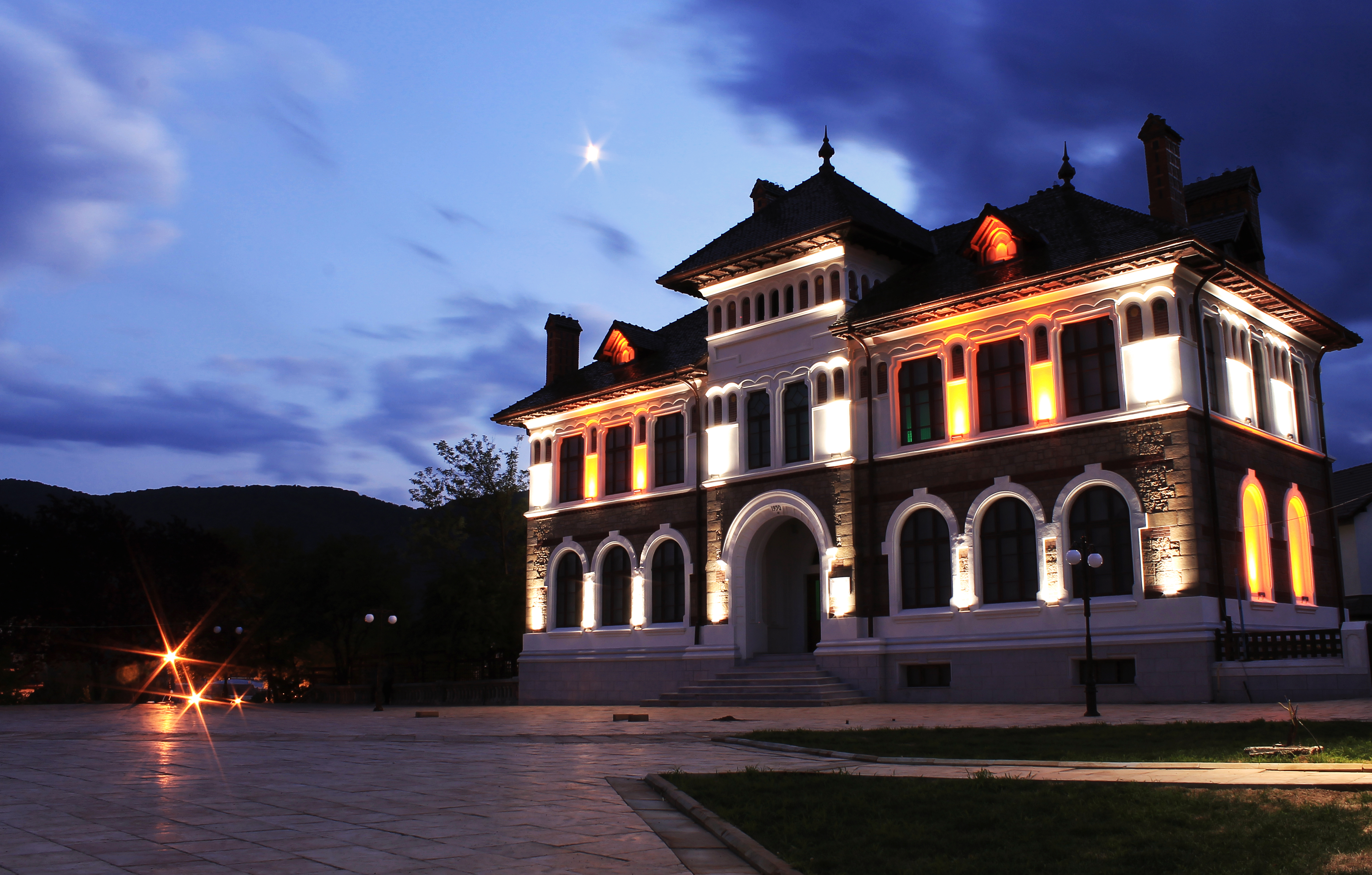
Art museum

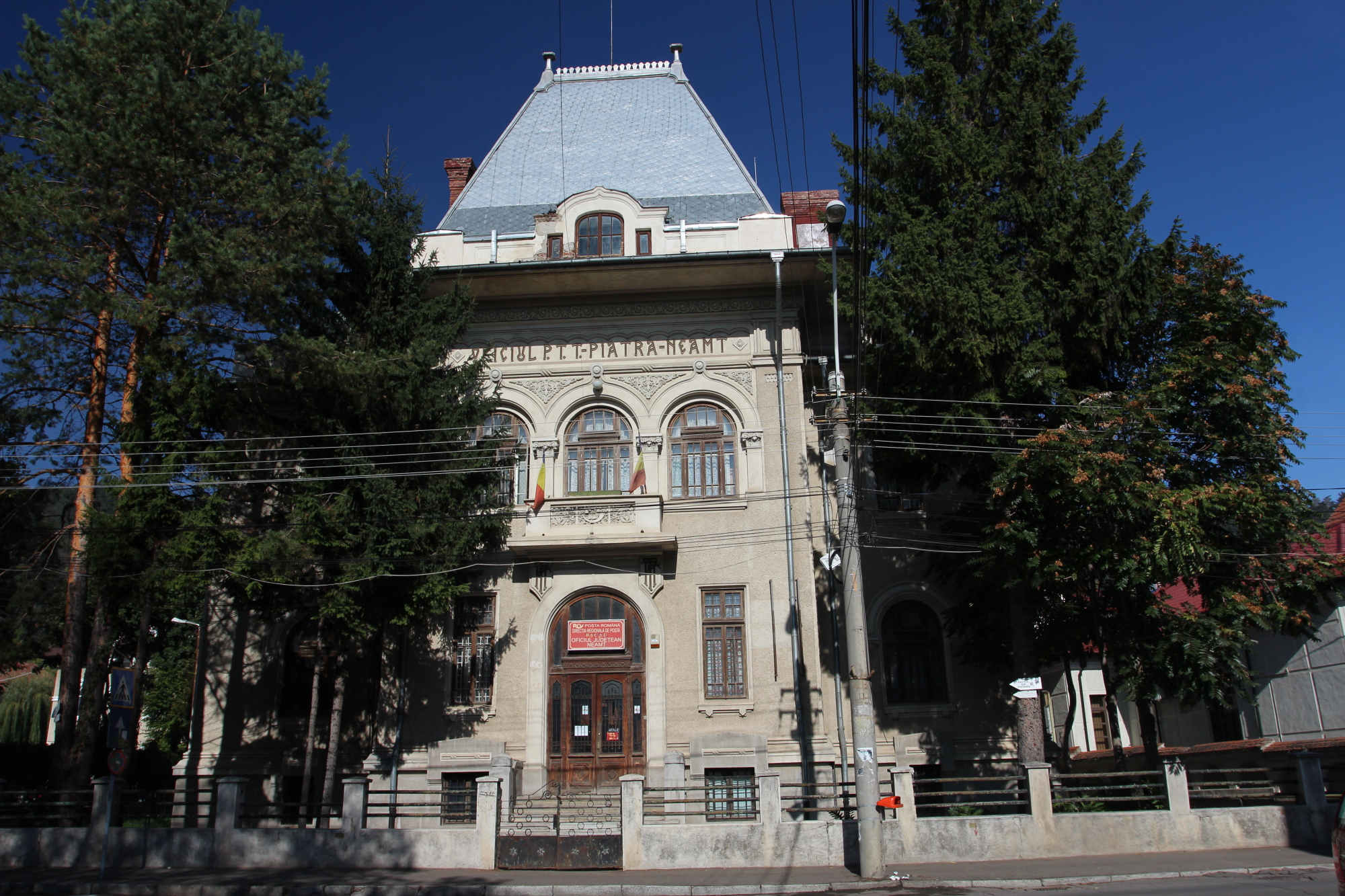
Central Post

Petru Rareș National College

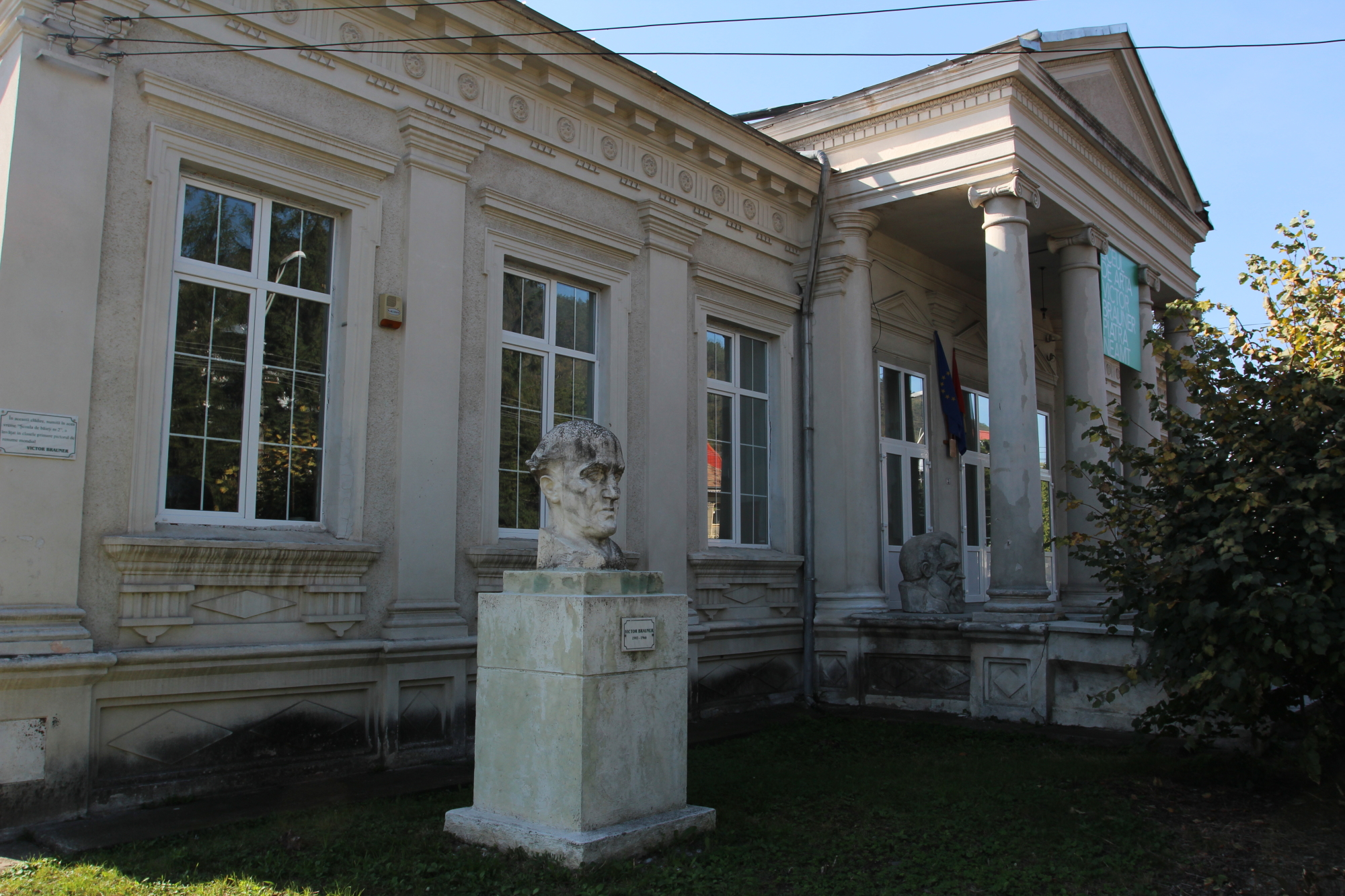
"Victor Brauner" Fine Arts College

== Attractions ==
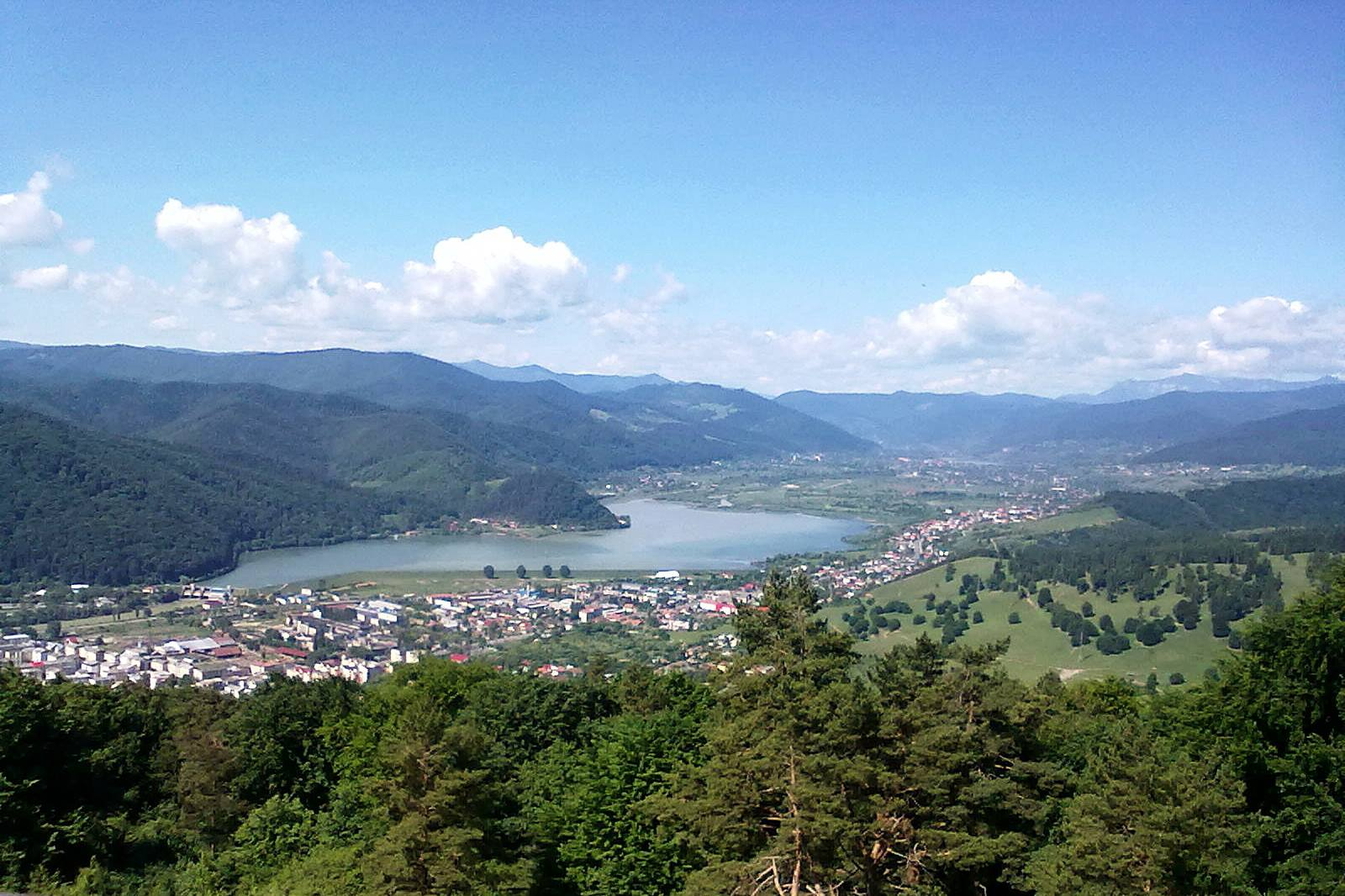
Batca Doamnei Reservoir

The city's main attractions are the natural environment of the area (the mountains and the lakes), the historical buildings, the museums, and the festivals. There are several projects in progress with the goal of transforming Piatra Neamț into a tourist destination in Romania; those projects include construction of a cable car and winter sports facilities. As of March 2022 there is a cable car service running from the railway station to the top of Cozla mountain.

=== Landmarks ===
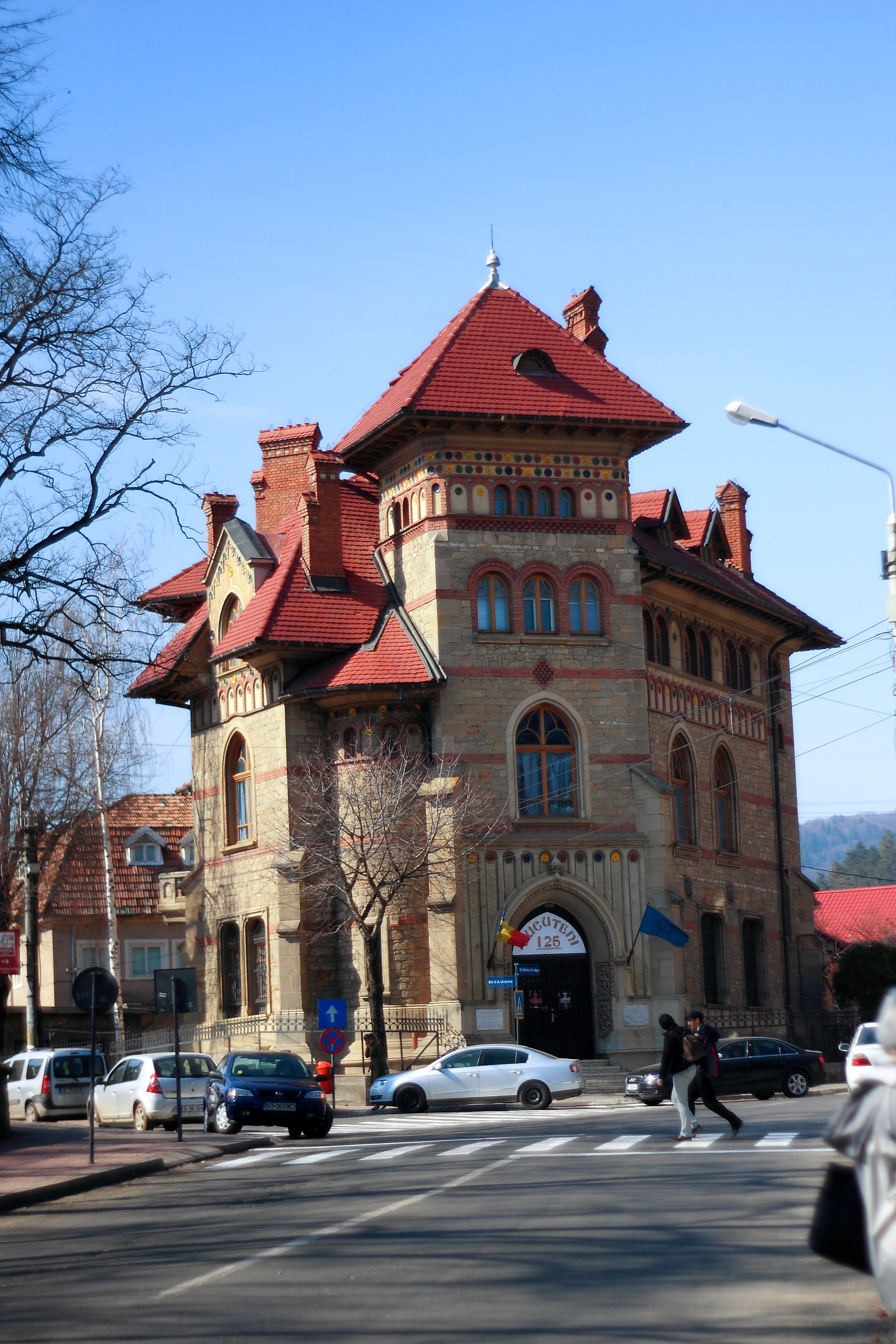
Cucuteni Museum

- St John the Baptist church (1497–1498) and Stephen's tower (1499), during Stephen the Great's reign
- The Princely Court
- The History & Archaeology Museum (host of the Cucuteni exhibition, the largest Aeneolithic artifacts collection in southeastern Europe)
- The Fine Arts Museum
- The Natural Sciences Museum
- The "Calistrat Hogaș" Memorial Museum
- The "Schimbarea la Față" Wooden Church in Văleni
- The Bistrița Monastery, founded in the early 15th century, is 8 km (5 mi) west of the city
- The Wooden Synagogue

=== Parks ===
- Central Park
- Cozla Park (including the Zoo and Cozla ski run)
- Ștrandul Tineretului (including the Equestrian Stadium)

== Sports ==
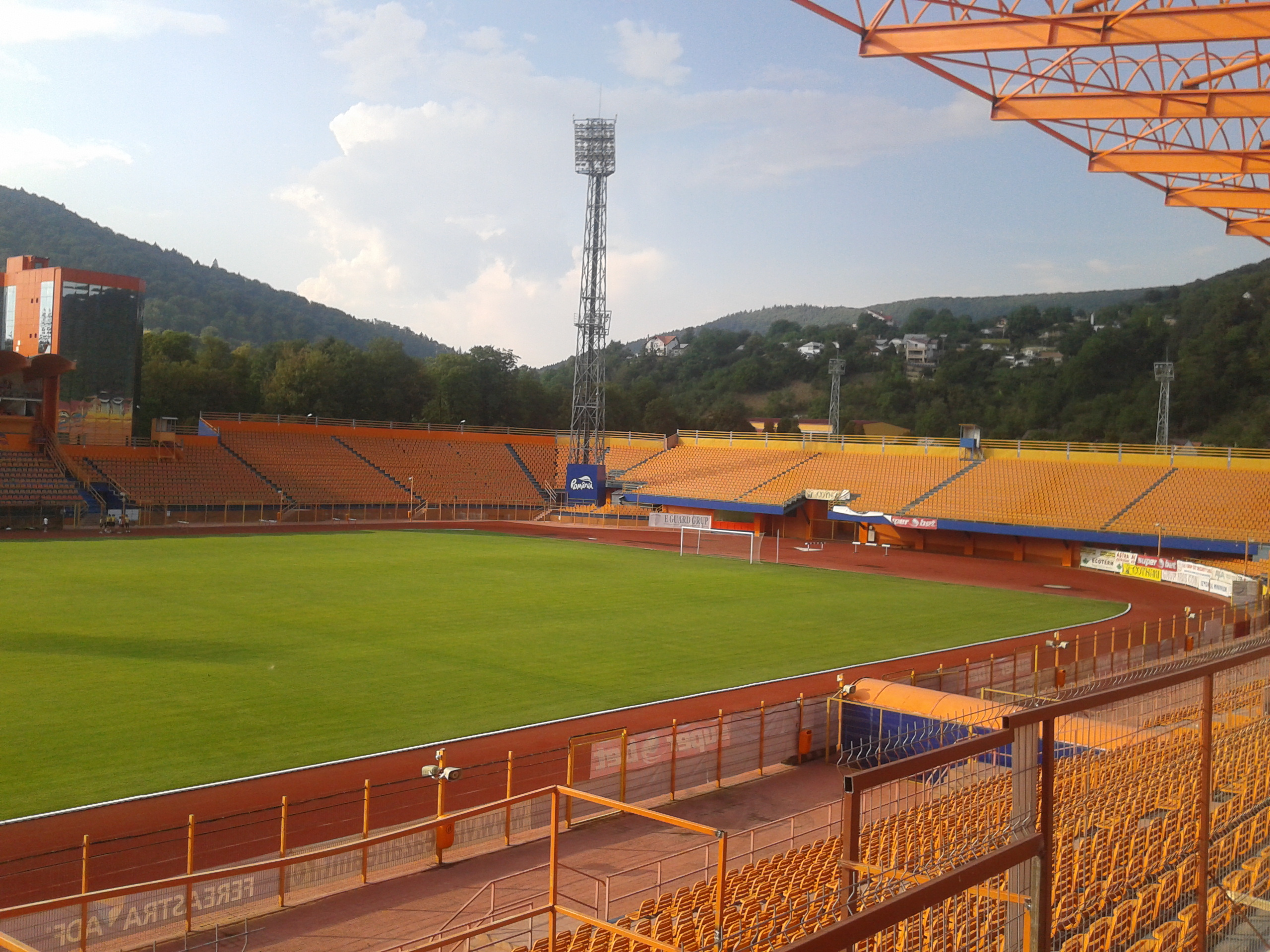
Ceahlăul Stadium

FC Ceahlăul Piatra Neamț is the local football (soccer) team; its best performance was third round in UEFA Intertoto Cup in 1999, after two matches versus Juventus Torino.

Former Fibrex Săvinești, actually HCM Piatra Neamț is the local men's handball team, three times champions of Romania and two times winners of Handball Romania's Cup. VC Unic Piatra Neamț is the local women's volleyball team.

Piatra Neamț is the residence of Constantin "Ticu" Lăcătușu, the first Romanian alpinist who reached the top of Mount Everest.

The Piatra Neamț Equestrian Stadium (Baza Hipică) is the host of several show jumping and dressage international competitions.

| Club | League | Sport | Venue | Established | Capacity |
|---|---|---|---|---|---|
| FC Ceahlăul Piatra Neamț | Liga III | Football | Stadionul Ceahlăul | 1919 | 18,000 |
| VC Unic Piatra Neamț | Divizia A | Volleyball | Polyvalent Hall | 1964 | 4,000 |

== Natives ==
- Marcel Adams (1920–2020), real estate investor
- Gershon Benjamin (1899–1985), painter
- Coca Bloos (born 1946), actress
- Anda-Louise Bogza (born 1965), soprano singer
- Harry Brauner (1908–1988), ethnomusicologist
- Victor Brauner (1903–1966), painter
- Emil Calmanovici (1896–1956), industrialist and communist activist
- Ramona Cheorleu (born 1982), television presenter and model
- Alexandru Dabija (born 1955), stage director and actor
- Sergiu Dan (1903–1976), novelist and journalist
- Luminița Dinu-Huțupan (born 1971), handball player
- Dan Graur (born 1953), evolutionary biologist
- Carola Grindea (1914–2009), pianist and teacher
- Jacques Hérold (1910–1987), painter
- Constantin Lăcătușu (born 1961), mountain climber (first Romanian ascent on Mount Everest)
- Gheorghe Manoliu (1888–1980), general
- Alexandru Maxim (born 1990), football player
- Mihaela Rădulescu (born 1969), TV host
- Andrei Rohețki (born 1985), football player
- Teodora Sava (born 2001), singer and actress
- Leon Sculy Logothetides (1853–1912), surgeon and politician
- Henric Streitman (1873–1950), journalist and politician
- Gheorghe Tadici, handball coach
- Bogdan Țăruș, athlete
- Daniel Tătaru, mathematician
- Jan Tausinger, violist, conductor, and composer
- Mihai Trăistariu, singer and songwriter
- V. A. Urechia, historian and writer
- Laura Vasiliu, actress
- Lascăr Vorel, painter
- A. L. Zissu, writer and journalist

== Twin towns – sister cities ==
Piatra Neamț is twinned with:

- Alpharetta, United States
- Beinasco, Italy
- Bergama, Turkey
- Edineț, Moldova
- Hlyboka, Ukraine
- Kiryat Malakhi, Israel
- Lod, Israel
- Mably, France
- Manilva, Spain
- Orhei, Moldova
- Riorges, France
- Roanne, France
- Verbania, Italy
- Villerest, France

== In popular culture ==
=== Astronomical dedication ===
In 1998 an asteroid was named after Piatra Neamț by Alfredo Caronia, an Italian amateur astronomer and co-discoverer of the asteroid, who lives in the city.

== Gallery ==
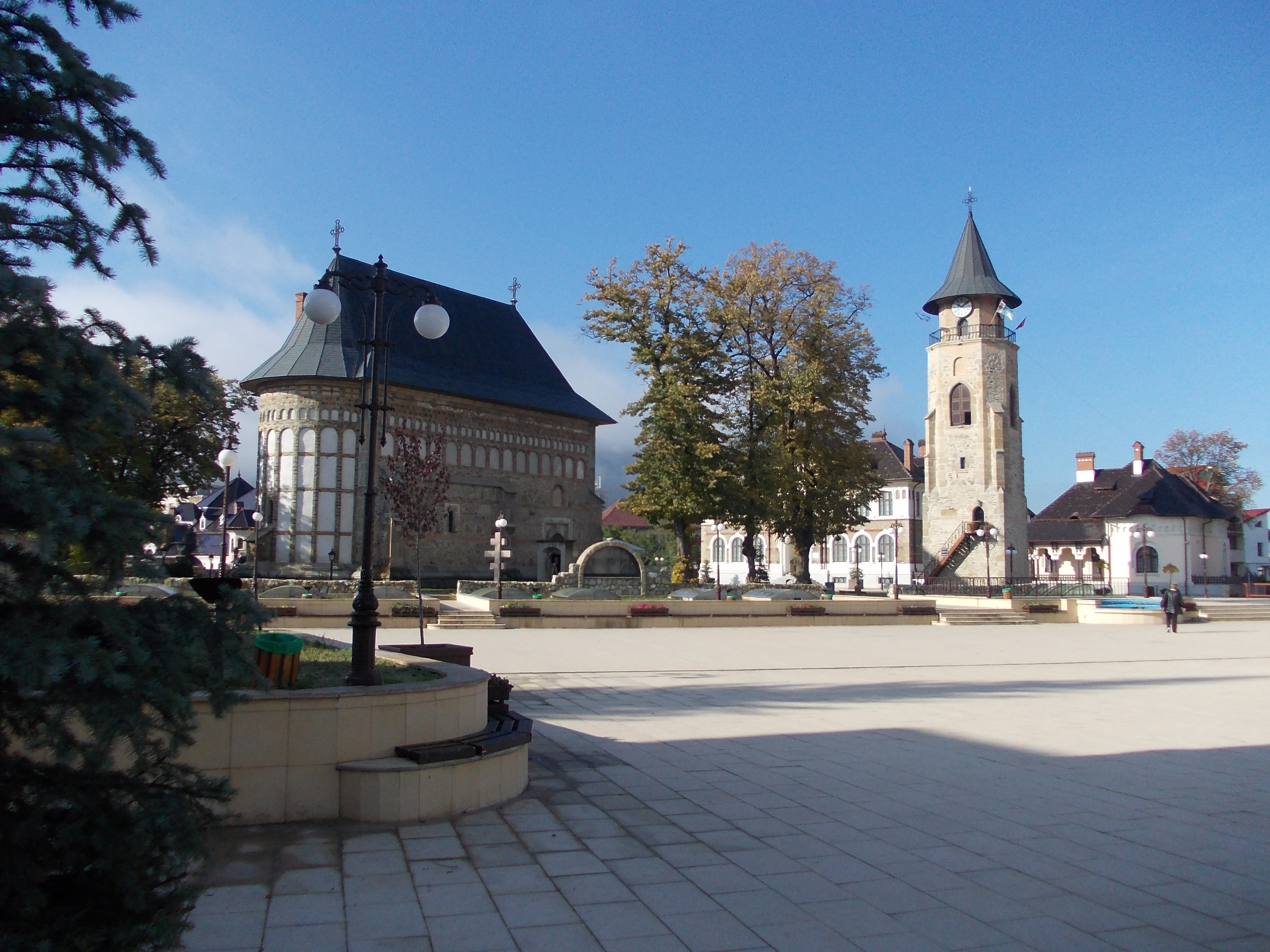
Stephen's Tower and the Princely Court Assembly

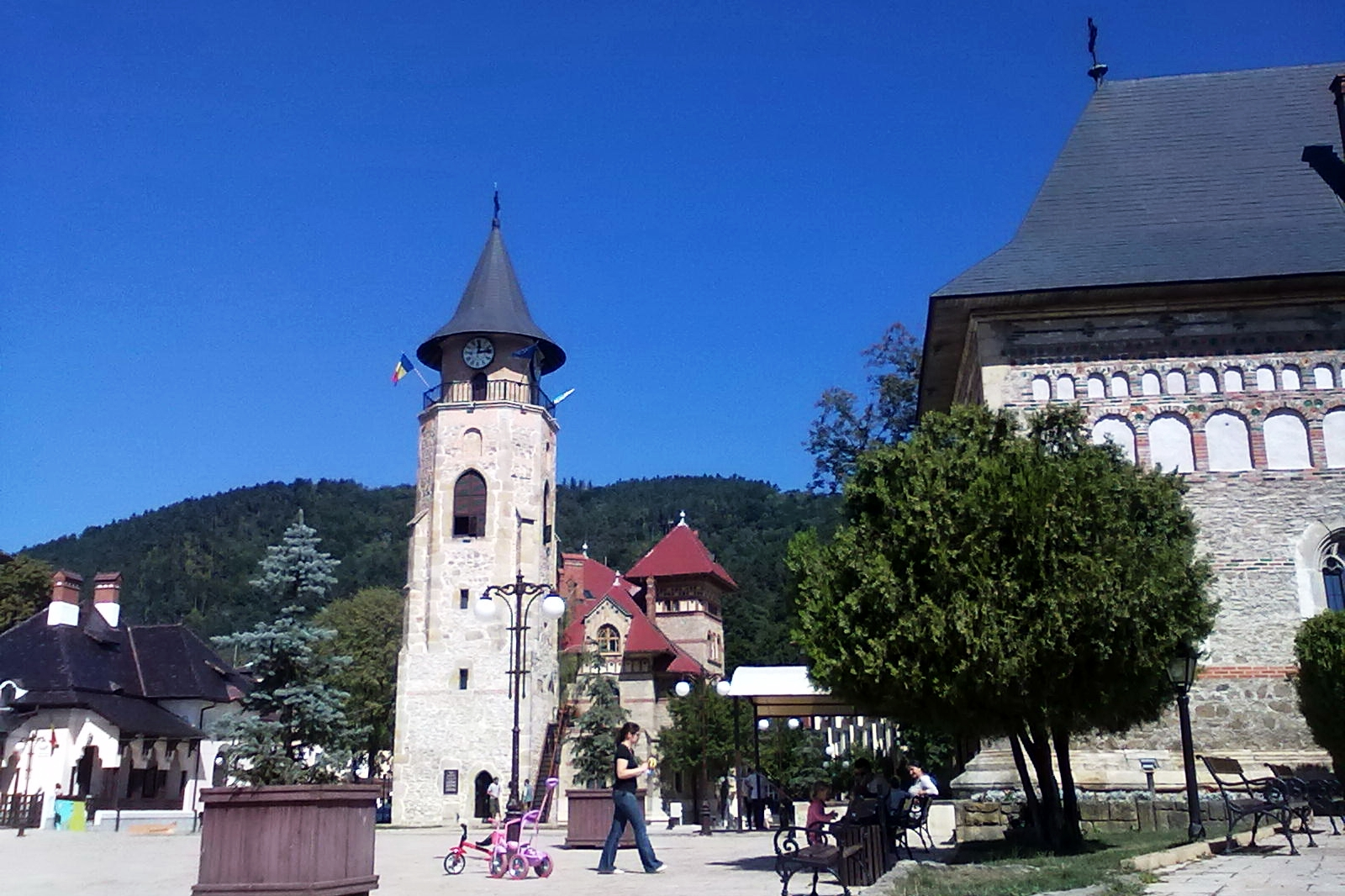
Stephen's Tower

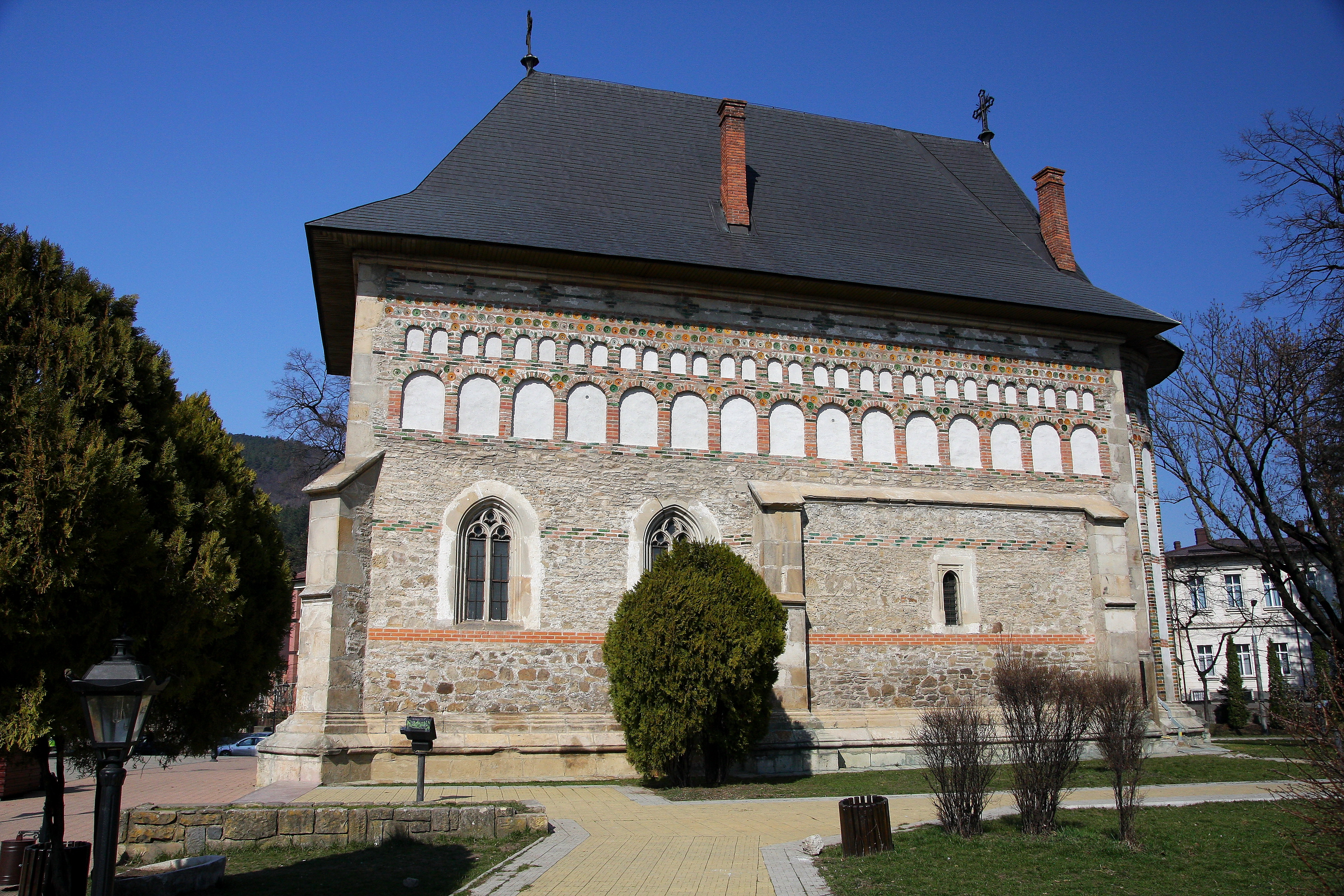
St. Ioan Church from royal court complex

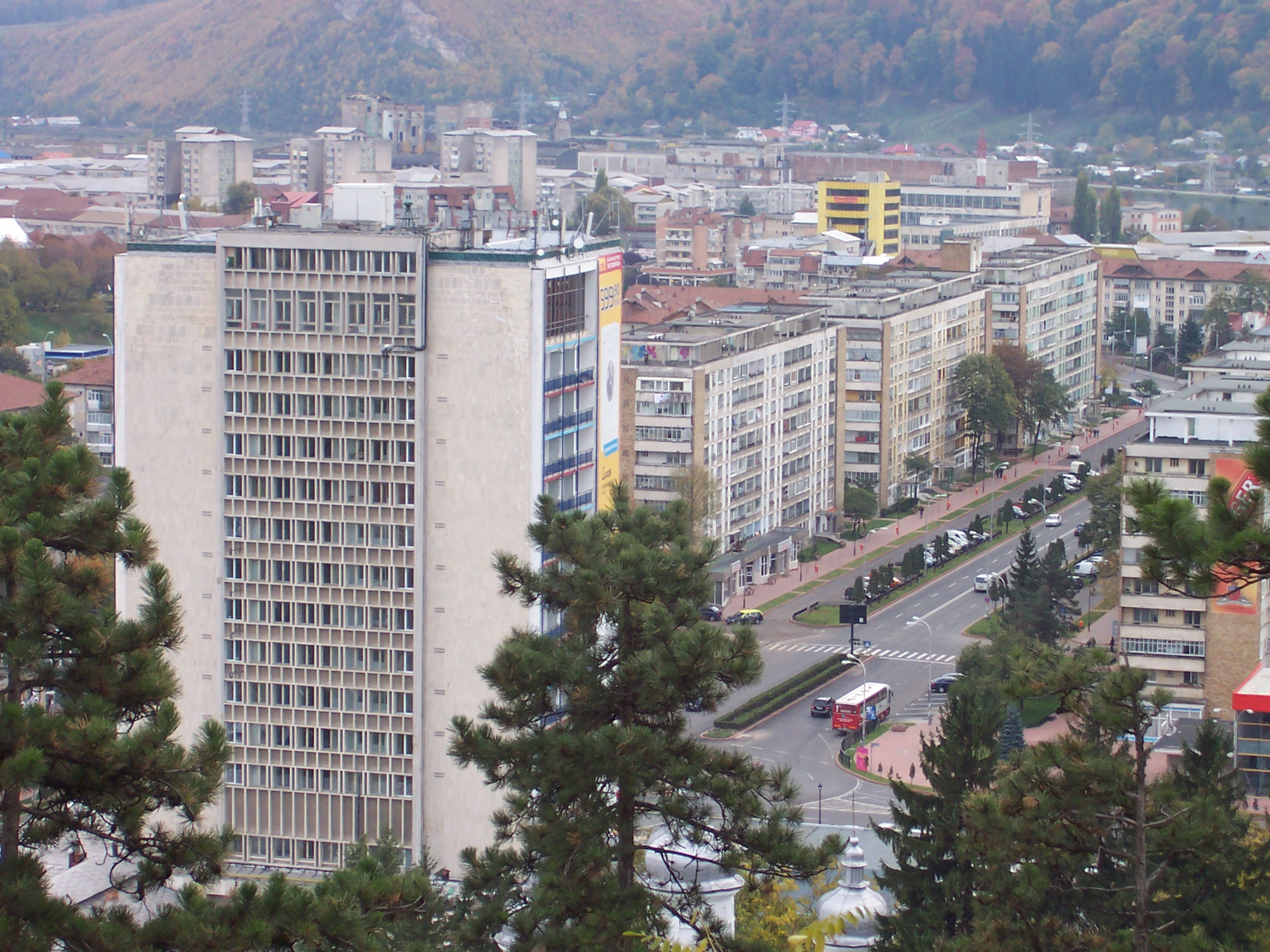
Ceahlău Hotel

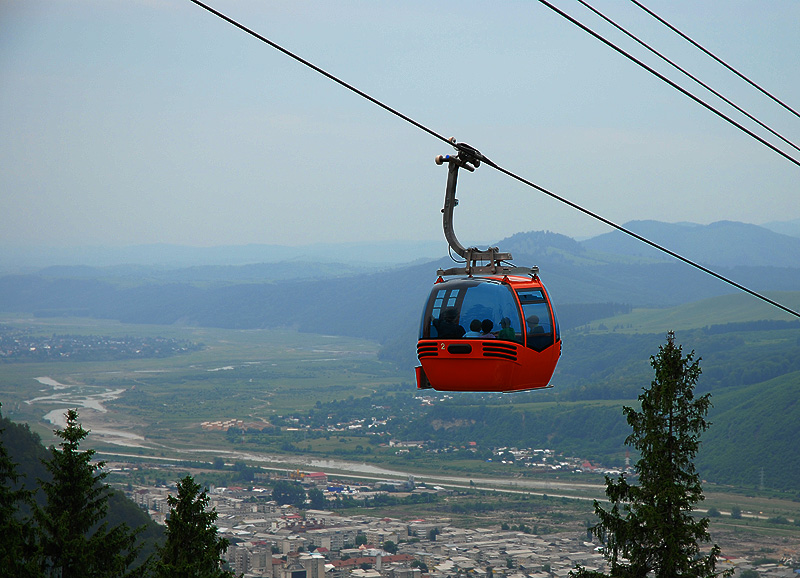
Cable car

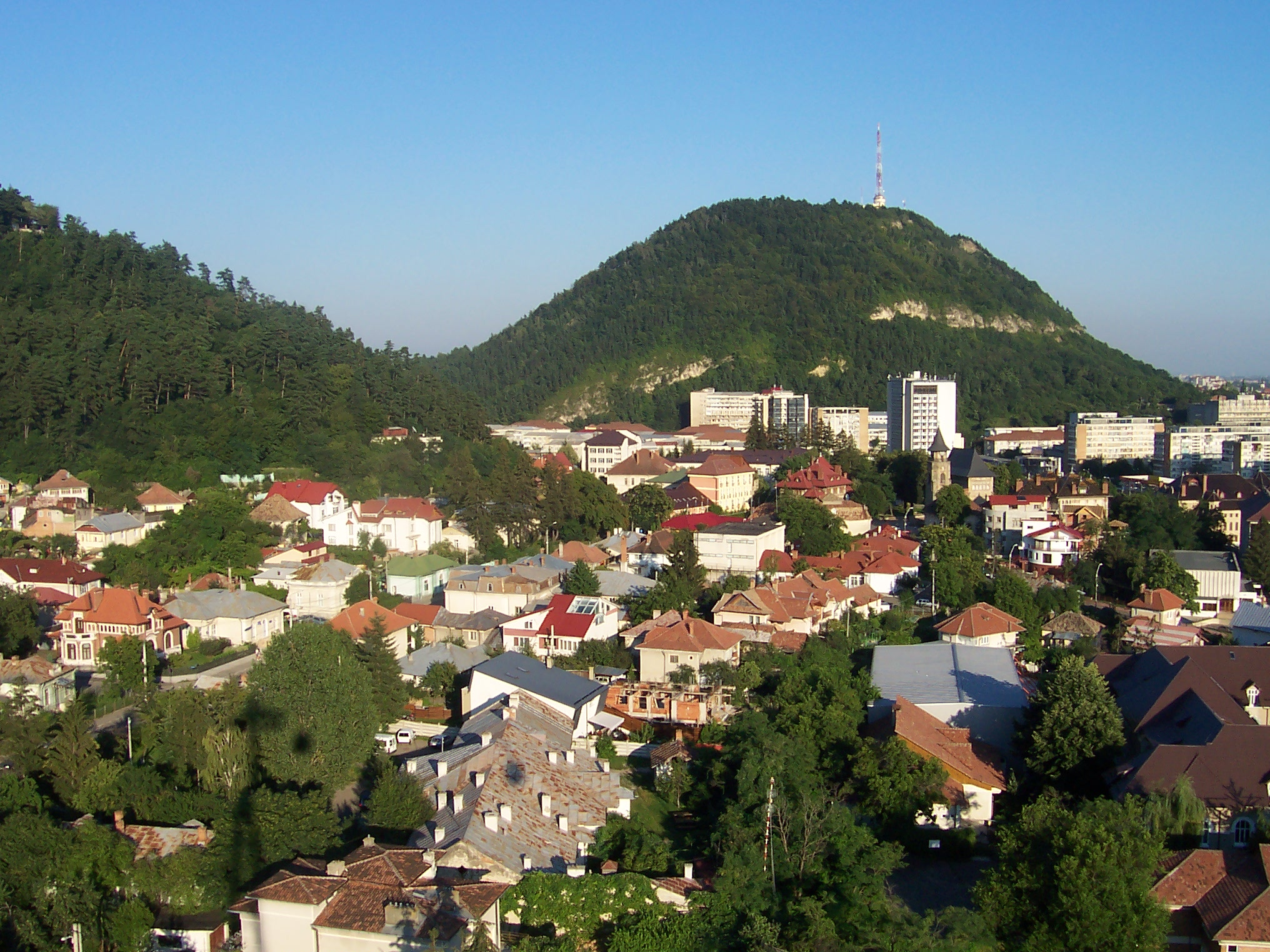
General view from cable car

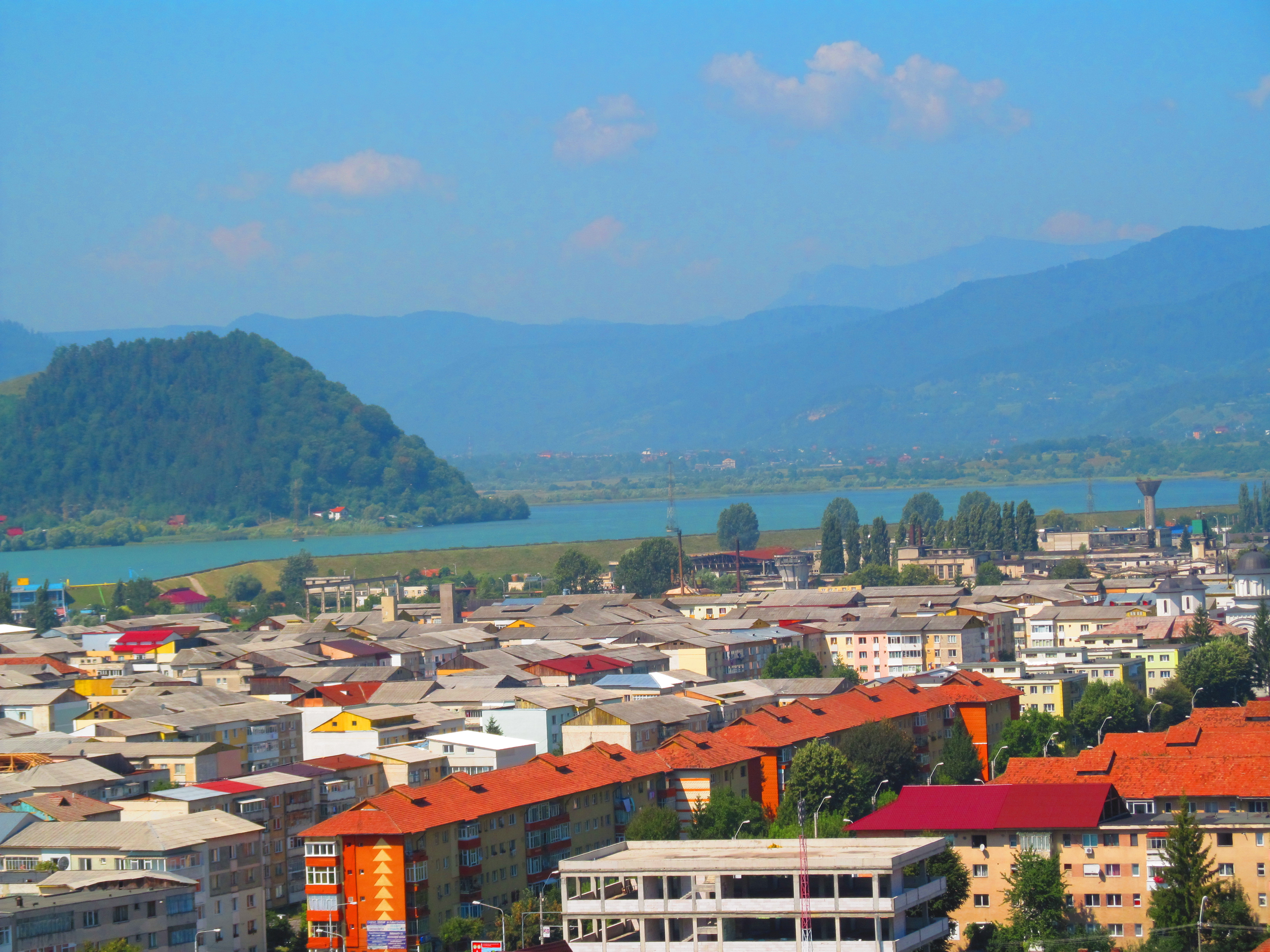
Bâtca Doamnei Lake

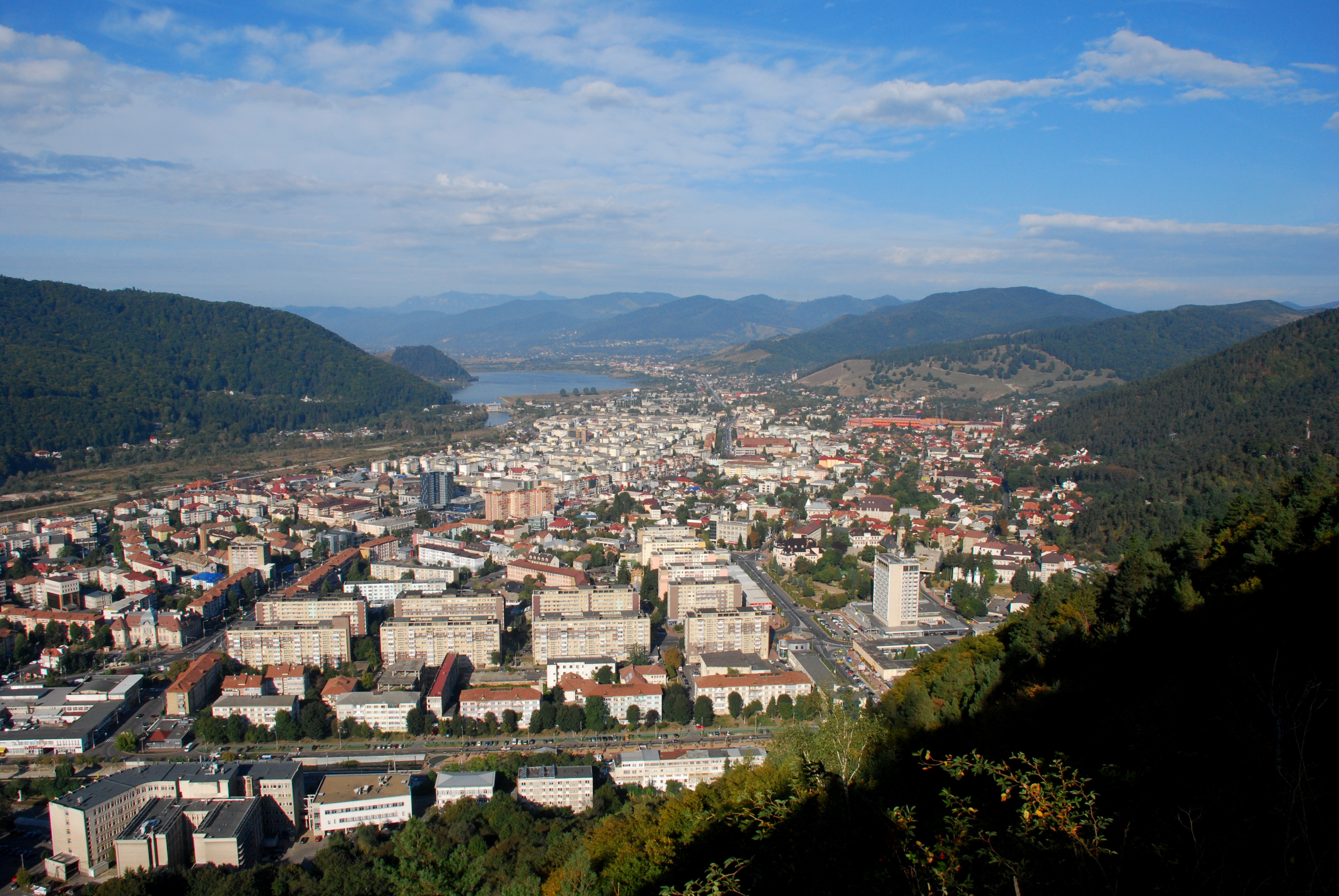
Aerial view

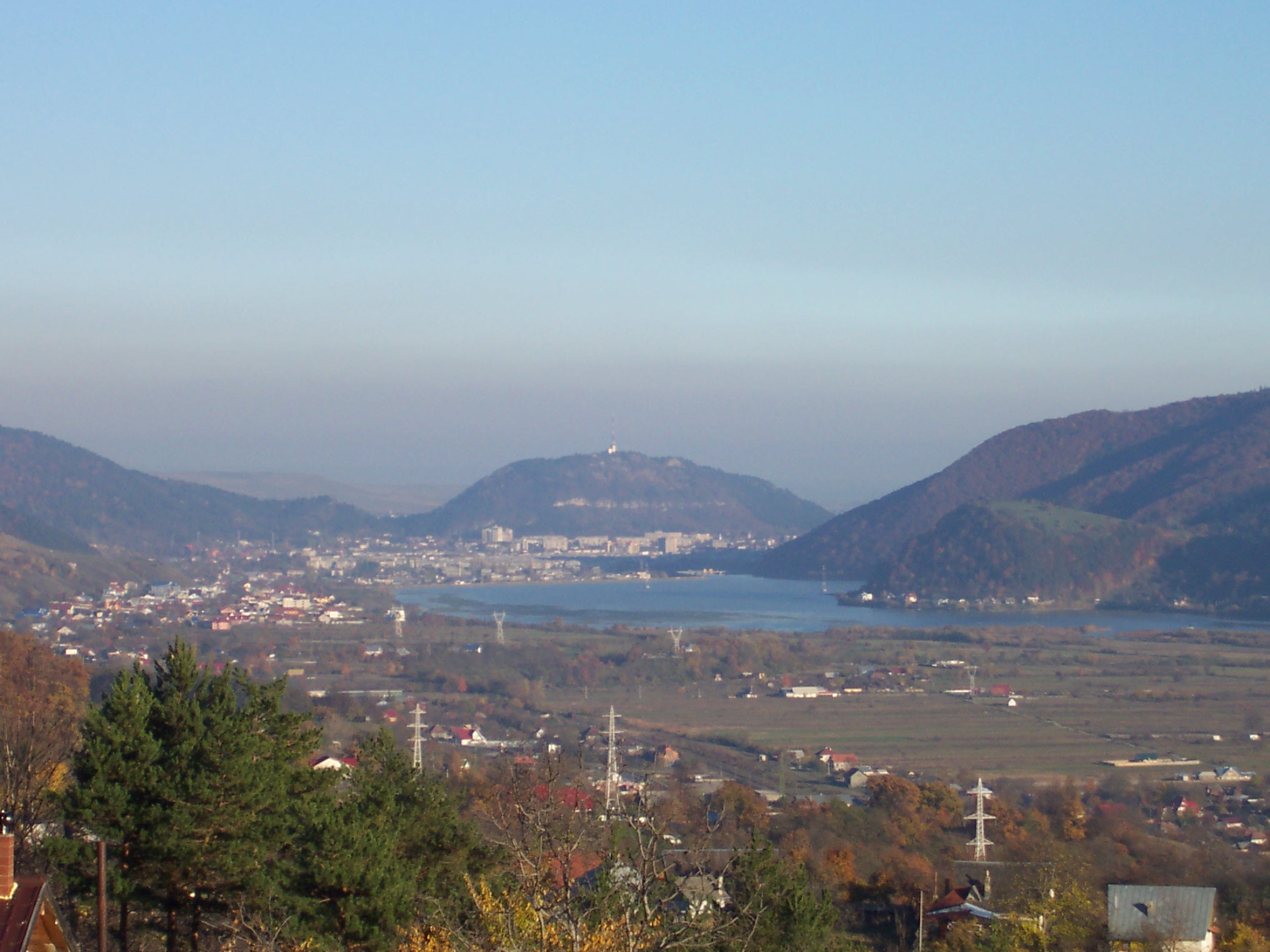
The city and the Bistrița River

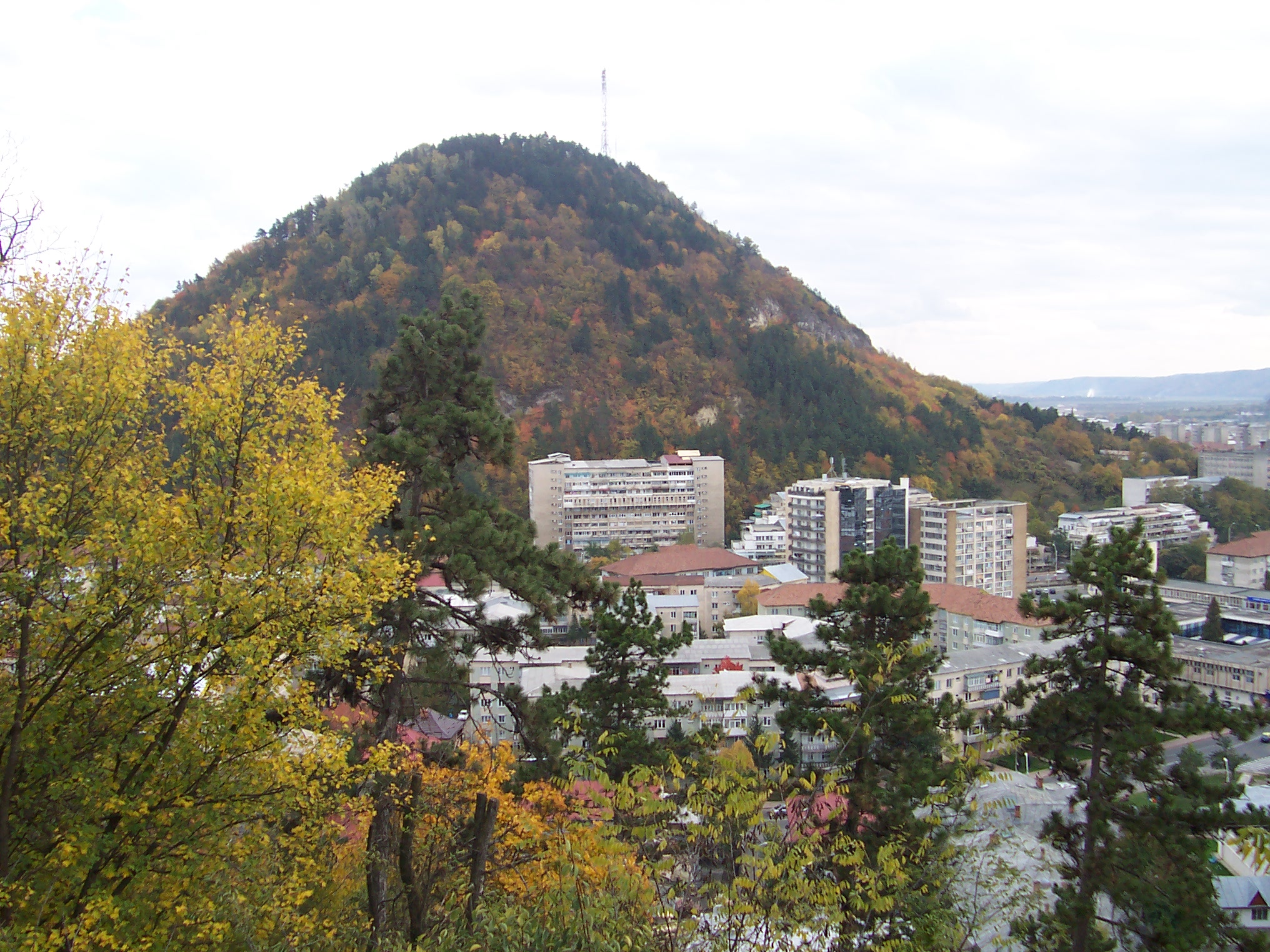
Mount Pietricica & TV tower

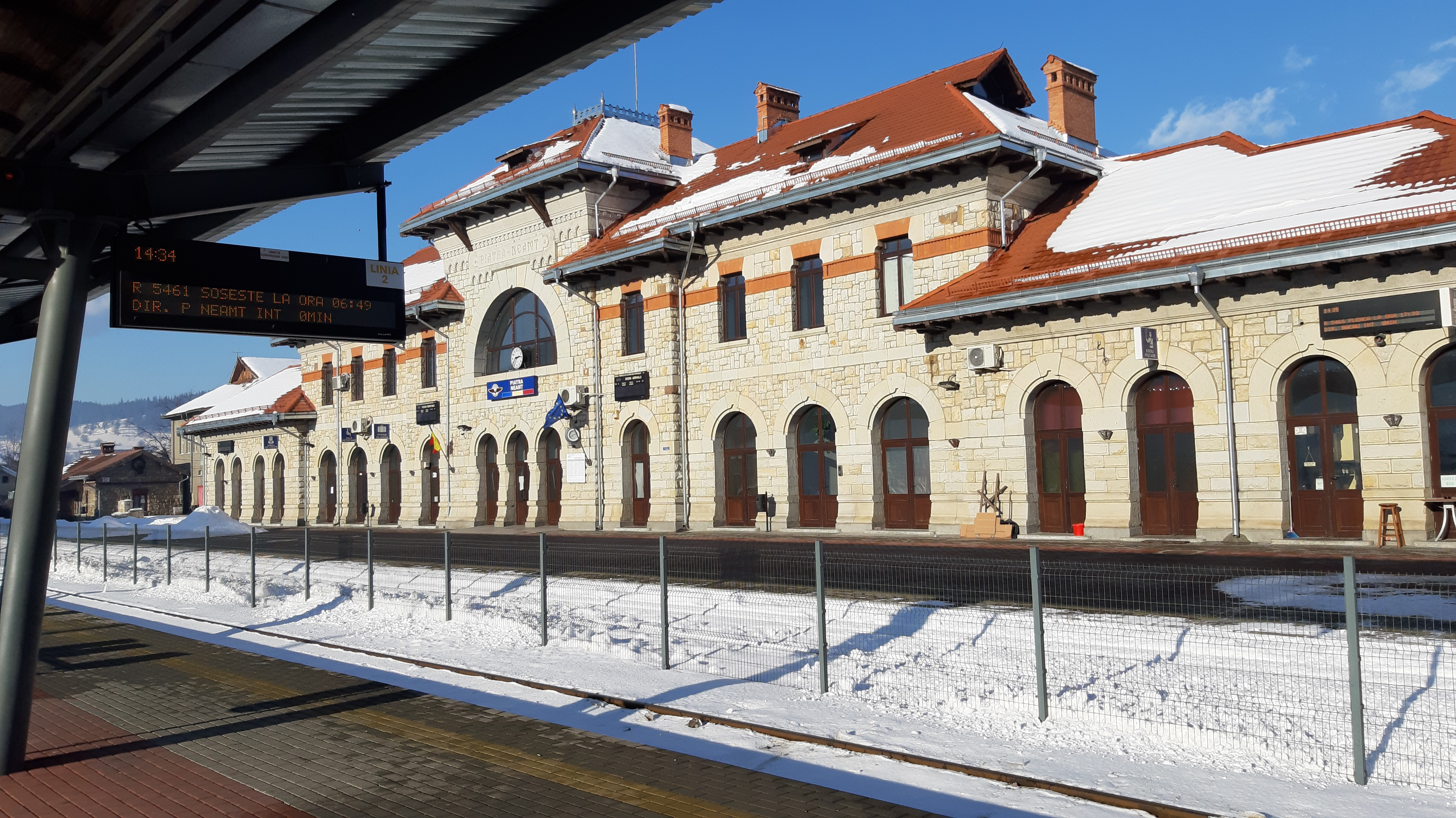
The CFR railway station

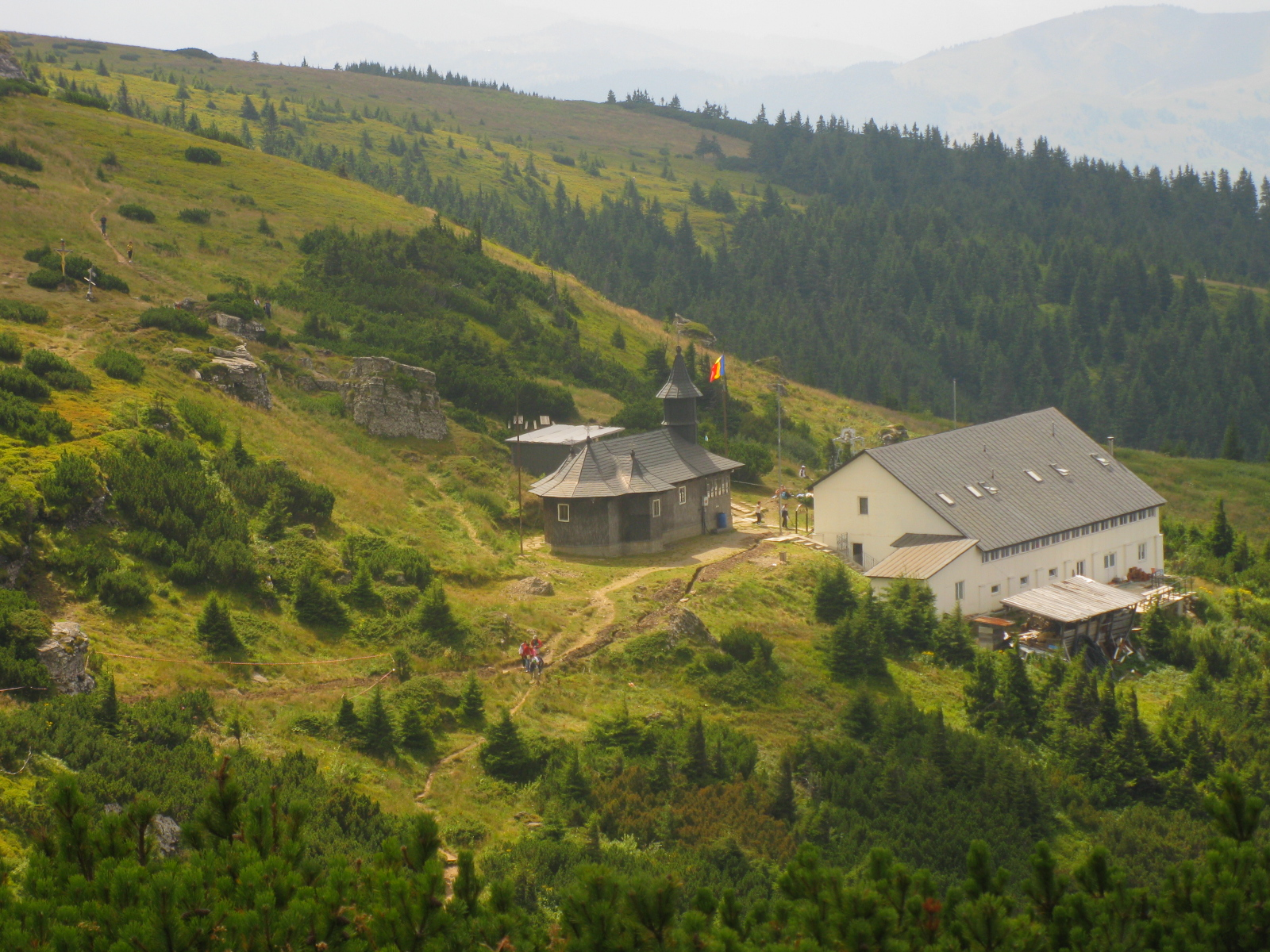
Dochia monastery
