= Andrei Rohețki =

Romanian footballer

Personal information
- Full name: Andrei Rohețki
- Date of birth: 18 November 1985 (age 40)
- Place of birth: Piatra Neamț, Romania
- Height: 1.75 m (5 ft 9 in)
- Position: Goalkeeper

Youth career
- Ceahlăul Piatra Neamț

Senior career*
Years	Team	Apps	(Gls)
2009–2011	Ceahlăul Piatra Neamț	15	(0)
2011–2014	FC Botoșani	3	(0)
2012–2014	→ FCM Dorohoi (loan)	21	(0)
2014–2015	Rapid CFR Suceava	18	(0)
2015–2022	F.C. Romania	90	(0)
Total		147	(0)
- * Club domestic league appearances and goals as of 20 June 2016

Andrei Rohețki (born 18 November 1985, in Piatra Neamț) was a Romanian footballer.
