= Ramona Cheorleu =

Television presenter and model

Ramona Cheorleu (sometimes credited as Ramona Chorleu or Chorleau; born 10 April 1982 in Piatra Neamț, Romania) is a Romanian television presenter and model. She is cohost of the show Cronache Marziane ("Martian Reports").

At the age of 18 she traveled from her native Romania to Italy, where she started working as a model.

The first broadcast in which she participated was Champion for ever, airing on Raiuno in 2003 and led by Luisa Corna. Since May the following year she was a dancer in the program 3, 2, 1 Baila, broadcast on prime time in Italy a weekend in the Access and led by Enrico Papi. In the same year took part in the special "Euro 2004" on Raidue, transmission dedicated to the UEFA Euro 2004. In the fall of 2005 she participated as a contestant in the reality show The Mole.
