= Nativity of St. John the Baptist Church, Piatra Neamț =

Orthodox church in Neamț, Romania

Coordinates: 46°55′59″N 26°22′08″E

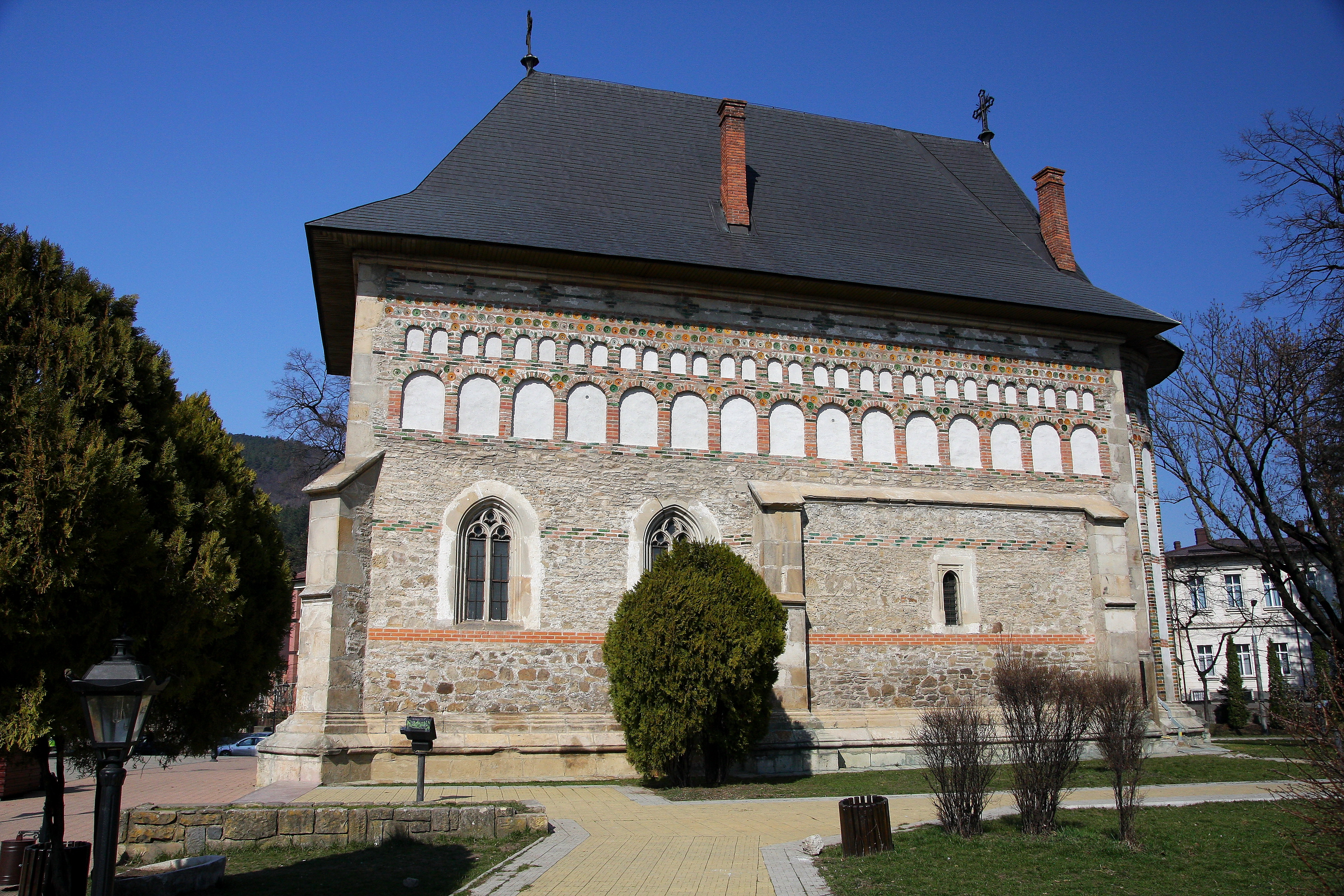
Nativity of St. John the Baptist Church

The Nativity of St. John the Baptist Church (Romanian: Biserica Nașterea Sf. Ioan Botezătorul), located at 2 Piața Libertății, Piatra Neamț, Romania, is a Romanian Orthodox church. Established by Prince Stephen the Great of Moldavia, it was built in 1497-1498 as part of his royal court in the town. The bell tower dates to the year after the church was completed, and is a symbol of the city. Both church and tower are well preserved examples of late 15th century Moldavian religious architecture.

== History and description ==
=== Church ===
Stephen the Great, Prince of Moldavia, was the ktitor of the church, built between 1497 and 1498. It originally formed part of the Piatra Neamț Princely Court, with the royal residence built from 1468 to 1475. The interior is divided into a vestibule, nave and altar. The vestibule has two domed ceilings, one in front of the other and divided by a large stone transverse arch. Originally, a sizable wall separated the vestibule from the nave. Later, when the interior space was enlarged, a large opening featuring a pronounced transverse arch was made in the wall. The nave is divided into three sections, separated by a pair of transverse arches. There are two apses built into the thick nave walls and visible from outside, accompanied by buttresses and covered in a cut stone structure as high as the springers. The altar apse has the typical semicircular shape, made up of quarter-sphere vaults. It has a single central window along the nave's axis. The eastern wall does not have characteristic tiny engravings, and the traditional niches of the Diaconicon and the Proskomedia are missing. The church is entered through a Gothic-style stone portal that combines elements common to its day with new concepts.

On the exterior, the base offers a solid support and has artistic touches as well: it is accurately designed, has a series of horizontal bands in relief that emphasize its depth, and there is an inclined plane connecting it to the next level. The rest of the building gave an opportunity for anonymous local craftsmen to display artistic talent that was both characteristic of its time period and quite varied. There are two rows of niches separated by a strip of glazed ceramic. Symmetrically juxtaposed with two small niches above a large one, they are all set off by frames of brightly colored face brick.

The old iconostasis is no longer in place, and the current one was built during an 1868-1873 restoration, with the painting modeled on Agapia Monastery's. A restoration in 1937-1938 brought the building as close to its original form as practicable. Being a princely church, Stephen furnished it with valuable objects, including a 1502 Gospel Book designed by the hieromonk Spiridon of Putna Monastery. An inscription in the book mentions it was created on the prince's orders, and it is richly decorated. Kept in the National Museum of Romanian History, it is written on large sheets of parchment in Old Church Slavonic. Entire pages are illuminated with miniatures depicting the Four Evangelists. Another work associated with the church is a chronicle from 1792 that records the most important events in its history. Eucharistic objects and other gifts left by Stephen have been lost over time to theft and fire.

=== Tower ===
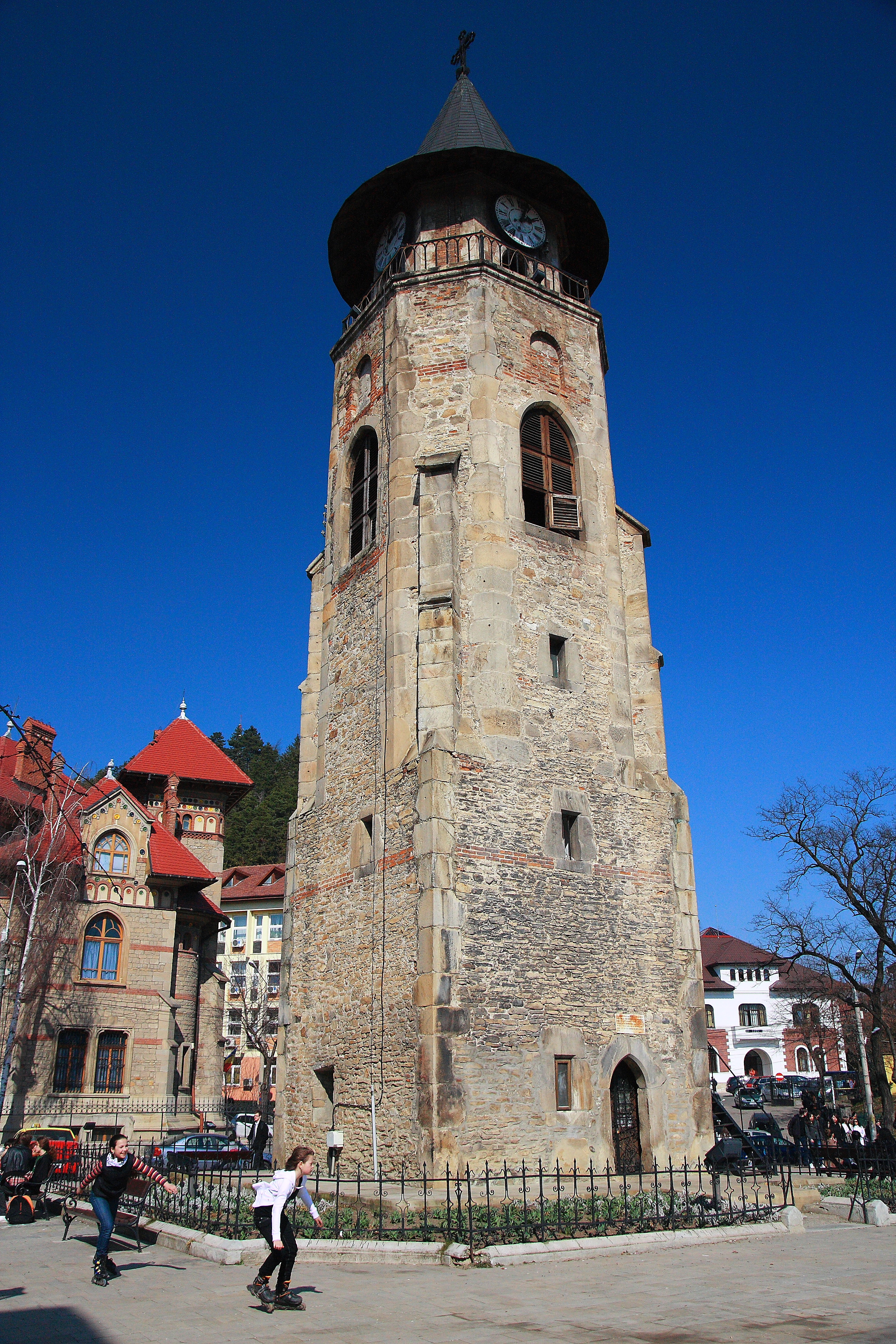
Stephen's Tower

The freestanding entrance tower located to the northwest of the church and nicknamed Stephen's Tower (turnul lui Ștefan), is in relatively good condition, without major modifications since it was built. Described by architectural historian Grigore Ionescu as "much more elegant, better proportioned and richer in valuable architectural details than that of Bistrița Monastery", the tower was built in 1499, a year after the church was dedicated, as attested by an inscription on its eastern wall. Its main purpose was and is as a bell tower, but it also played a secondary role as observation tower, allowing guards to watch over the Bistrița River and the roads leading to the Neamț Citadel and Roman, picking out enemies and seeking refuge from them. It is 19 m high and 5.8 m wide, with a square base for the first 7 m (up to the second level) and becoming an octagonal prism higher up. The structure is made of dry stone interlaced with a few rows of brick. The angles of the prism as well as the buttresses, which extend for several meters, are of polished stone. In certain places, the flat corner blocks of stone still preserve little discs of glazed and colored terracotta. These were affixed onto holes left in the stones by the grips used to lift them up the scaffold, at the same time enriching the decor of the facade.

The basement room has a vaulted ceiling and is sealed off. The ground floor is also vaulted, has two small windows in the southern and western walls, and is entered straight through a door on the western side. The next floor was formerly accessed by a ladder, replaced by a metal staircase; higher up, there is an interior stairway up to the bell chamber. This room contains trace elements of arches that suggest a hemispherical ceiling. There are four bells: a large one from the 17th century, producing a special tone; another from the 19th century; and two from 1979. A level was added to the tower in the mid-19th century, providing a lookout for fires. An 1847 engraving by Gheorghe Asachi shows no upper deck, but this was certainly in place by 1861, when a public subscription was opened for purchasing and mounting a giant clock. The first clock was possibly brought from Vienna in 1861, but other accounts indicate the clock was manufactured there in 1888 and donated in 1890. Although no longer the tallest structure in Piatra Neamț, the tower remains a symbol of the city.

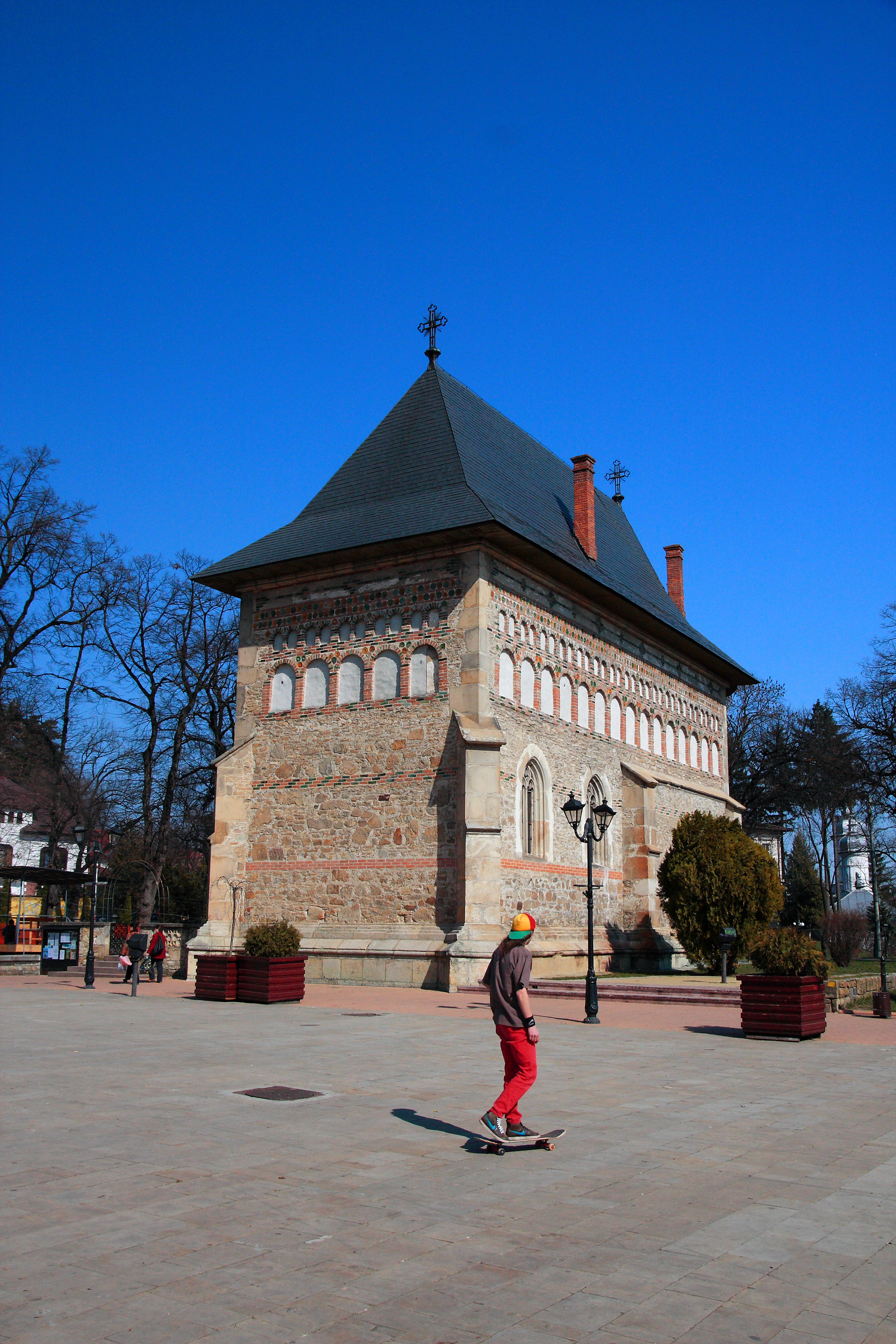
West end of the church

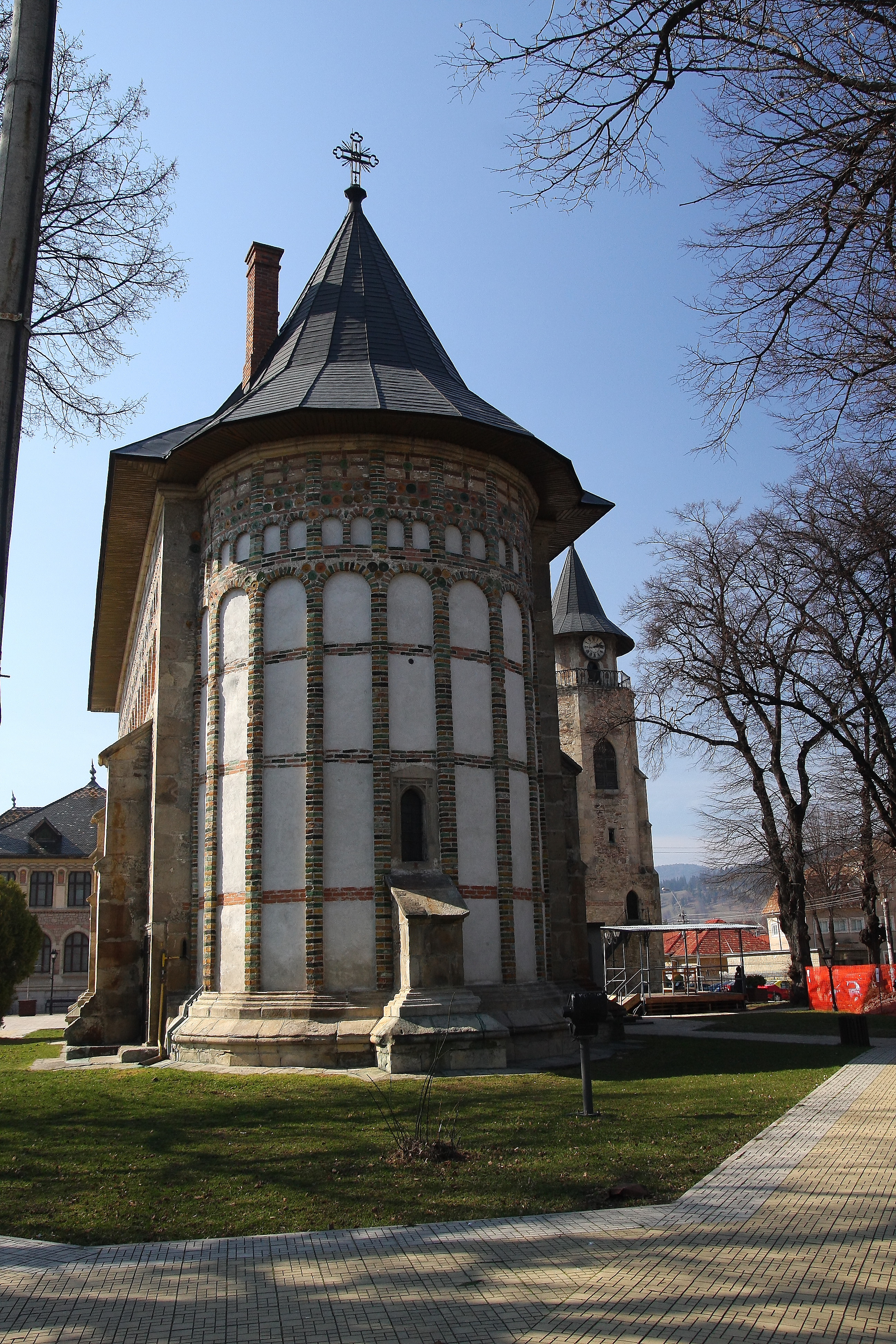
East end

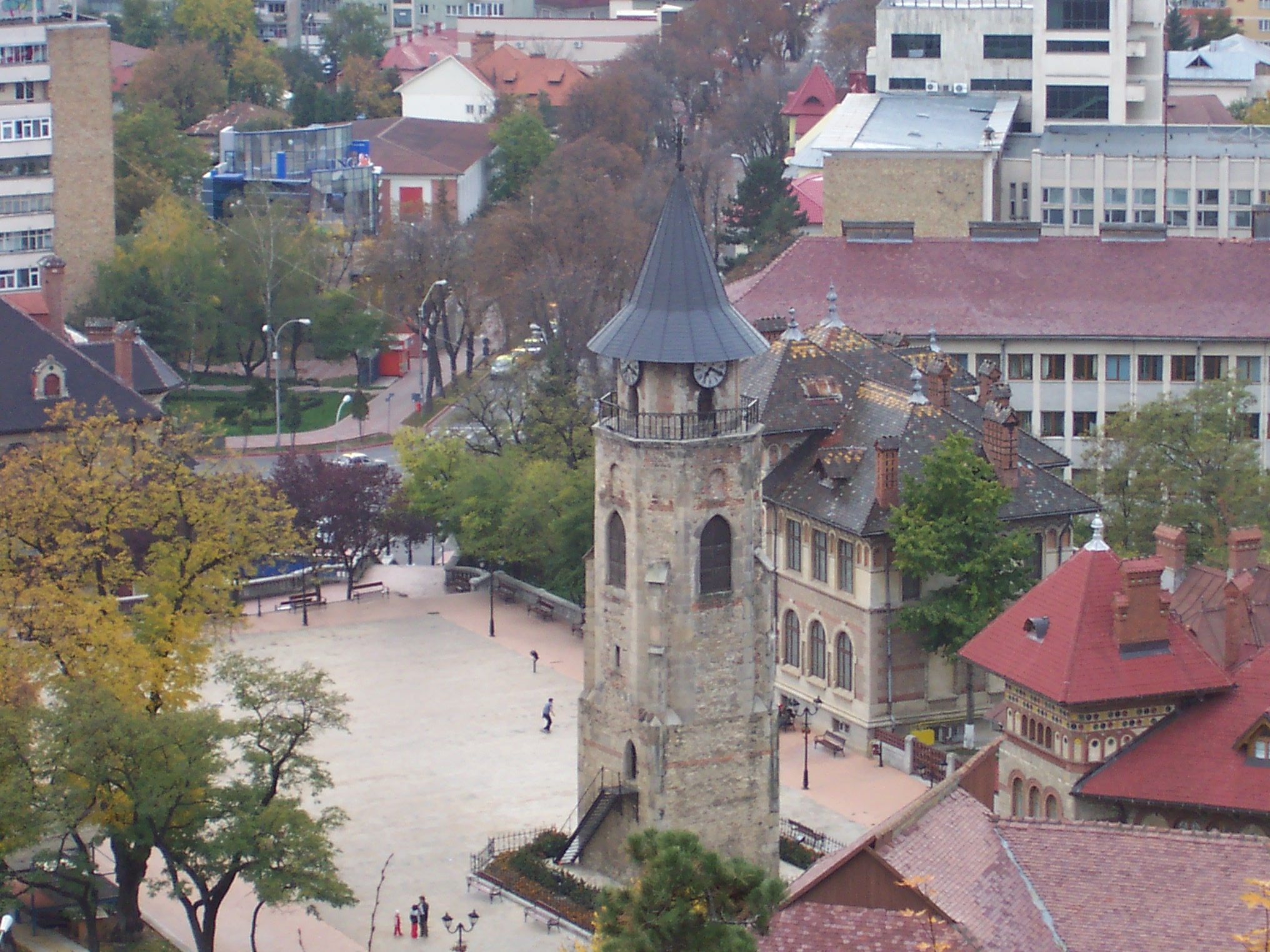
The tower from above

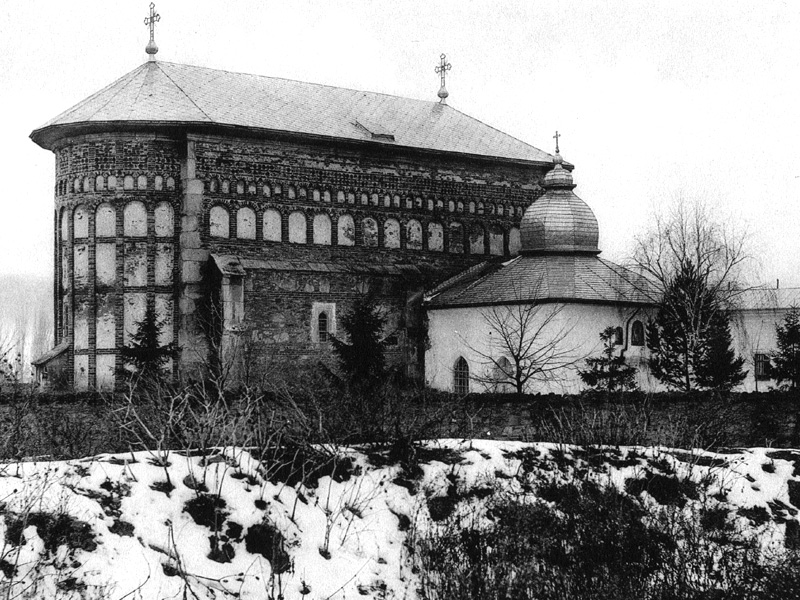
The church around 1900

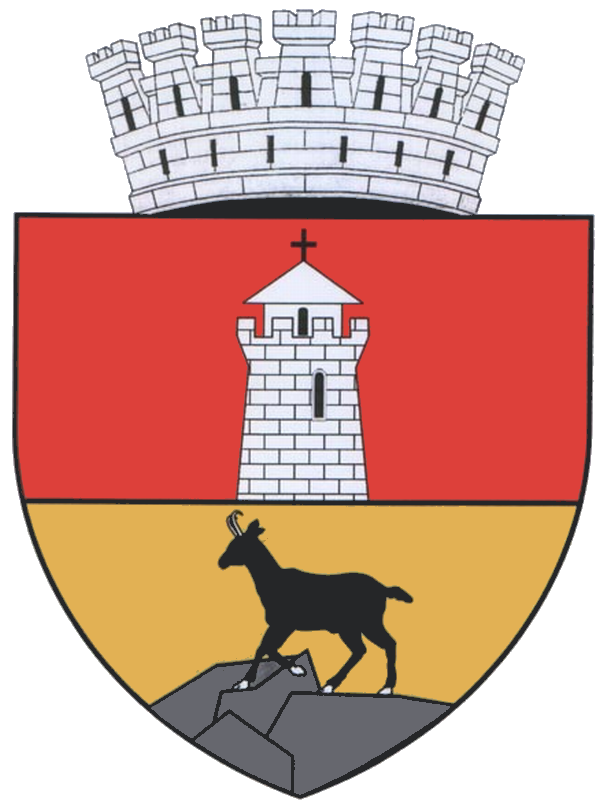
City coat of arms, featuring the tower
