= Paolo Esposito =

Italian chartered accountant and academic

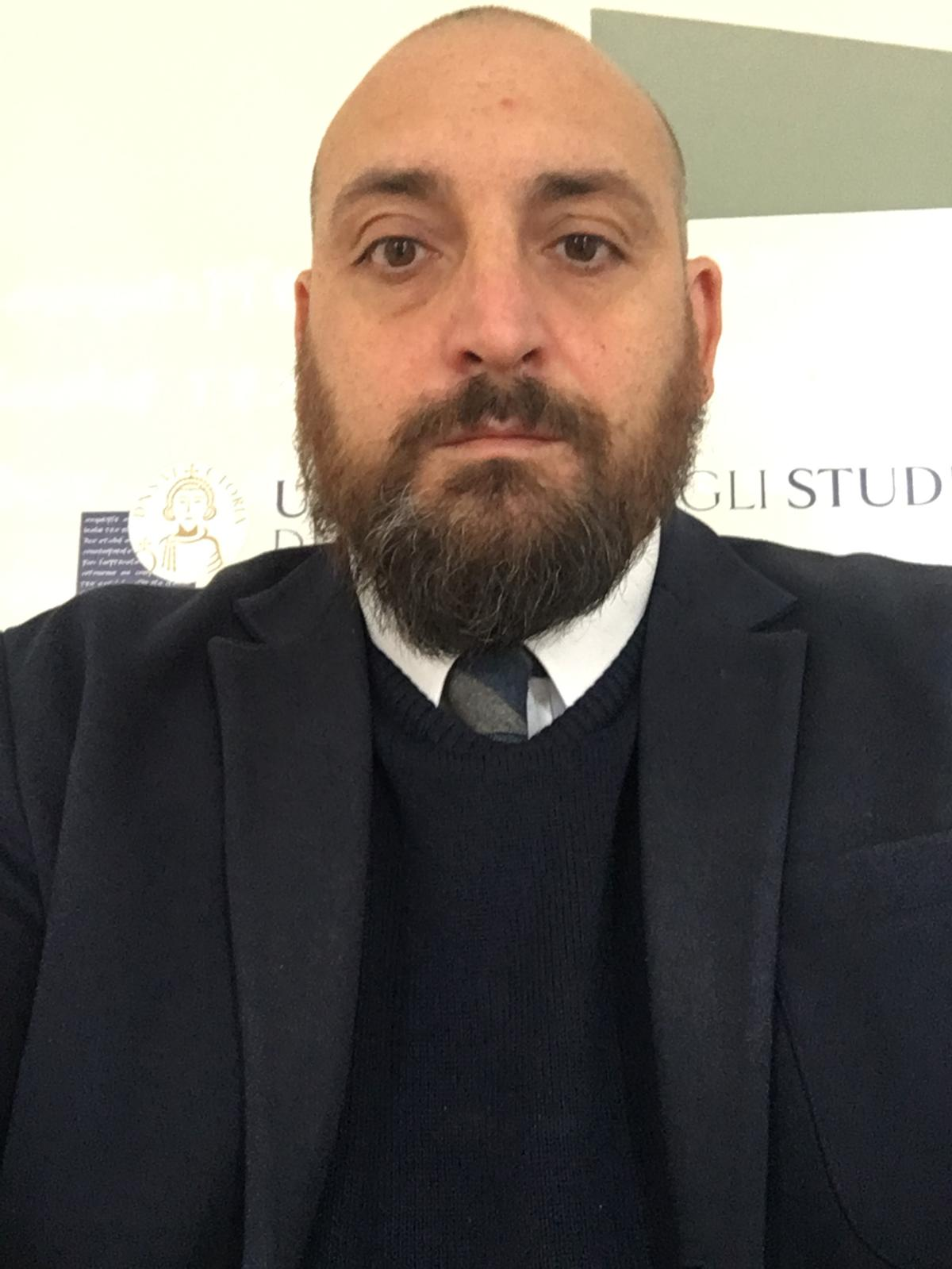
- Born: April 8, 1976 (age 50); Naples, Italy
- Occupations: Professor, business consultant, chartered accountant, auditor and an academic

Academic background
- Education: Master of Business Administration; Masters, Auditing and Internal Control; Ph.D., Management and Governance
- Alma mater: University of Naples; University of Pisa; University of Rome Tor Vergata

Academic work
- Discipline: Finance
- Sub-discipline: public-private partnerships, accounting regulation, and accountability
- Institutions: University of Naples "Parthenope"; WSB University; University of Sannio

Paolo Esposito is an Italian academic, professor and a chartered accountant. He is a professor of Business Administration at University of Naples "Parthenope", a research professor of accounting at WSB Merito University as well as an associate professor of accounting at the University of Sannio.

He is an CONSOB member of the College of the Arbitrator for Financial Disputes (ACF) and an executive board member of the Balance Sheets and Sustainability Group (GBS).

Esposito's research focuses on the intersection of public-private partnerships, accounting regulation, and accountability, with an emphasis on digital information management, public integrity, and sustainable practices. His work has been published in academic journals, including Public Money & Management, Business Ethics, the Environment & Responsibility, Business Strategy and the Environment, Meditari Accountancy Research and Corporate Social Responsibility and Environmental Management.

== Education ==
Esposito completed his Master's degree in Business Administration from University of Naples in 2001. Subsequently, he completed his Post-Master's degree training in the years 2004 and 2005 from the University of Rome as well as the University of Pisa respectively. Later in 2010, he completed his Ph.D. in Management and Governance from the University of Rome Tor Vergata.

== Career ==
Esposito began his academic career in 2015 at LUM Jean Monnet University. There, he held appointments as the coordinator and professor of Public Management and Sustainability in the International PhD in Economics and Management of Sustainability and Innovation. In 2016, he joined the University of Sannio as a researcher in accounting. He also moderated lectio magistralis by Sabino Cassese. In addition, he is the CONSOB member of the College of the Arbitrator for Financial Disputes. Since 2021, he has been a full research Professor of Accounting at WSB University and has served as an Associate Professor of Accounting and Business Administration at the University of Sannio since 2019.

Since 2020, Esposito has served as the associate editor of the Journal of Small Business Management. He also serves on the editorial boards of academic journals, including the International Journal of Globalization and the Business Ethics, the Environment & Responsibility and is an executive board member of the Balance Sheets and Sustainability Group (GBS), overseeing universities and public administrations.

== Research ==
Through his 2009 study, Esposito explored a new governance model for Italian Public Administration aimed at combating corruption and enhancing accountability by increasing citizen participation. Three years later, in 2012, he examined the impact of IFRIC 12 on accounting for Public Private Partnerships (PPP) and Service Concession Arrangements, focusing on how it clarified and systematized related concepts and definitions, particularly in Italy, and evaluated its effectiveness in reducing conceptual vagueness and improving the management of these arrangements. In 2014, he authored a chapter in the book titled Sovereign Risk and Public-Private Partnership During the Euro Crisis. Through this chapter, he compared PPP development in Europe, noting that Italy, Spain, and the UK had advanced regulatory frameworks while France and Germany lagged with gaps, exploring how these differences affected PPP effectiveness.

Esposito's 2015 research investigated the factors contributing to public disvalue in the Italian public sector and found that effective management of mafia-seized assets transformed this disvalue into new public value. Later in 2020, he explored PPP performance evaluation, advocating Public Value theory as a comprehensive framework to assess profitability, efficiency, and sustainable development, while emphasizing the influence of performance measurement on business strategies. In the same year, he authored another paper in the Journal of Cleaner Production. The paper discussed integrating renewable energy into smart communities, emphasizing a multidisciplinary approach that connected technical, socio-economic, and environmental factors to build sustainable, efficient energy systems with smart grids and energy sharing. More recently in 2023, he investigated how business size, complexity, and visibility affected sustainability disclosure among large European airports, finding that higher passenger numbers, cargo, terminals, gates, and social media presence boosted sustainability reporting.

== Selected articles ==
- Esposito, P., & Ricci, P. (2015). How to turn public (dis) value into new public value? Evidence from Italy. Public Money & Management, 35(3), 227–231.
- Ceglia, F., Esposito, P., Marrasso, E., & Sasso, M. (2020). From smart energy community to smart energy municipalities: Literature review, agendas and pathways. Journal of Cleaner Production, 254, 120118.
- Ceglia, F., Esposito, P., Faraudello, A., Marrasso, E., Rossi, P., & Sasso, M. (2022). An energy, environmental, management and economic analysis of energy-efficient system towards renewable energy community: The case study of a multi-purpose energy community. Journal of Cleaner Production, 369, 133269.
- L'Abate, V., Vitolla, F., Esposito, P., & Raimo, N. (2023). The drivers of sustainability disclosure practices in the airport industry: A legitimacy theory perspective. Corporate Social Responsibility and Environmental Management, 30(4), 1903–1916.
