= Journal of Medical Sciences =

The name Journal of Medical Sciences (sometimes abbreviated J. Med. Sci.) may refer to:

- International Journal of Medical Sciences, abbreviated Int. J. Med. Sci.
- Israel Journal of Medical Sciences, abbreviated Isr. J. Med. Sci., replaced by Israel Medical Association Journal
- Journal of Medical Sciences (Tapei Taiwan), published by Medknow Publications
- Journal of Research in Medical Sciences, abbreviated J. Res. Med. Sci., official journal of Isfahan University of Medical Sciences
