= Leonardo Bianchi =

Italian neurologist (1848–1927)

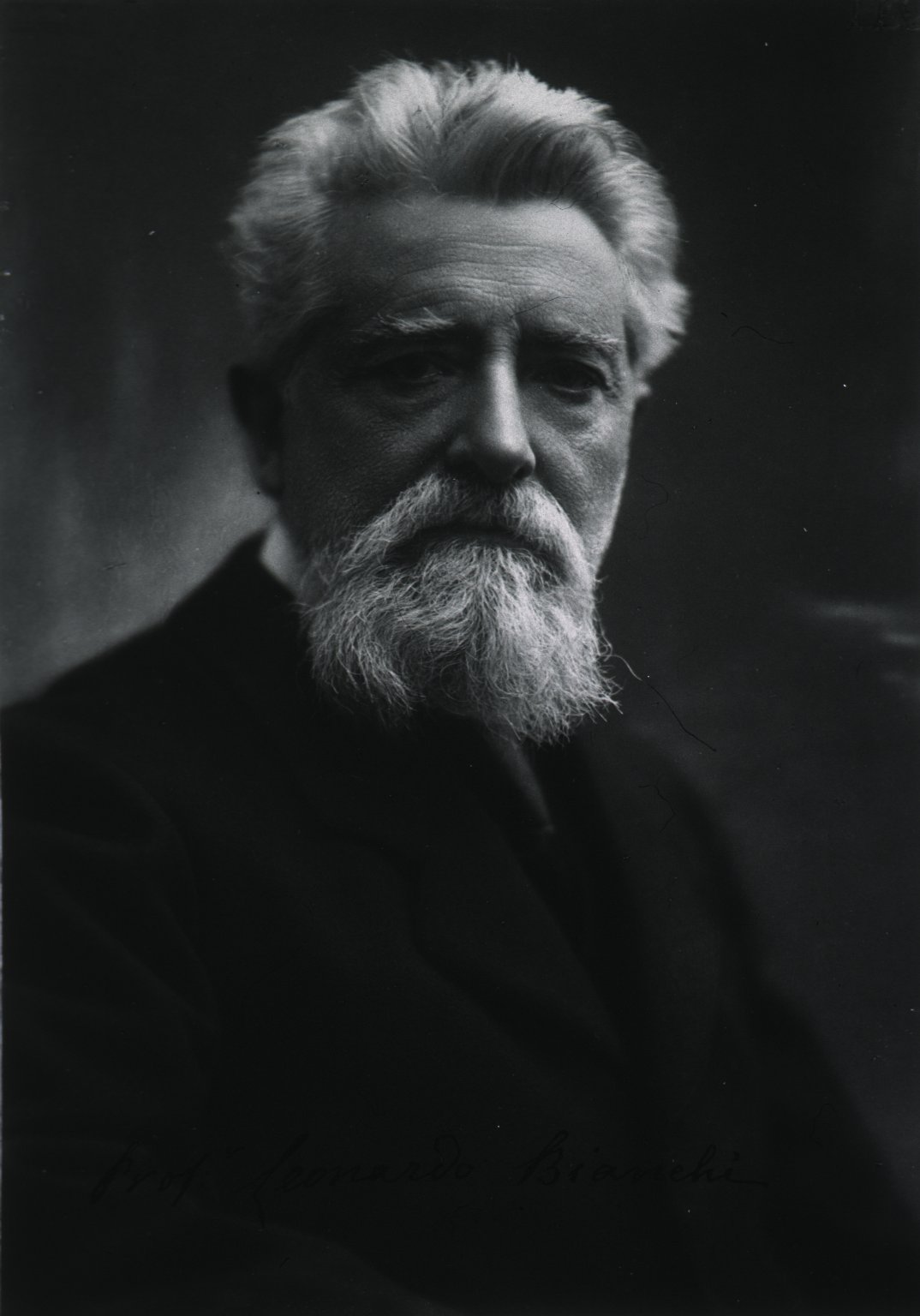
- Born: 5 April 1848; San Bartolomeo in Galdo, Kingdom of the Two Sicilies
- Died: 13 February 1927 (aged 78); Naples, Italy
- Known for: La meccanica del cervello (The Mechanism of the Brain), 1920
- Scientific career
- Fields: Neuropathology

Leonardo Bianchi (5 April 1848 – 13 February 1927), an Italian neuropathologist, politician, and writer from San Bartolomeo in Galdo in the Province of Benevento, earned fame from his work on cerebral functions and diseases of the nervous system. His work contributed to the very first known handbook of neurological semiology and examination in Italy.

== Early life and education ==
Leonardo Bianchi was born in the small Italian town San Bartolomeo in Galdo on 5 April 1848. He was the son of Vincenzo, a pharmacist, and chemist, and Alessia Longo. Bianchi showed an interest in literature, classical arts, and education from an early age. He completed his secondary and high school education in Benevento and graduated in Medicine and Surgery from the University of Naples in January 1871. Where he was taught by great influences, such as Luciano Armanni and Otto Von Schron.

== Medical career ==
After receiving his medical degree, Bianchi developed an interest in neuropsychiatry while working as a doctor at the Real Albergo dei Poveri. He delved into various scientific and medical topics, and in 1876, he received a teaching degree in electrotherapy, medical pathology, and medical clinic at the University of Naples.

From 1879 to 1881, Bianchi was appointed professor of the medical clinic at the University of Cagliari, where he worked with the Director of the Clinic of Nervous and Mental disease, Giuseppe Buonomo, at the Royal Asylum of S. Francesco di Sales. Giuseppe Buonomo also served as a professor of psychiatry at the University of Naples, with Binachi serving as his assistant. In 1882, he founded the Annali di neurologia or better known as the Psychiatric Institute of Naples. He eventually served as a professor of psychiatry and neuropathology at the Universities of Palermo and Naples from 1888 to 1923. While working as a professor, he wrote a manual on the semiology of diseases of the nervous system. His manual was the first handbook to fully describe neurological signs and symptoms and gave, in detail, the workup for neurological examination.

After the death of Giuseppe Buonomo, Bianchi was appointed director of the Royal Asylum of S. Francesco di Sales, where he worked to reform the asylum's practices as well as implement various hospital and institutional reforms. In 1910, his best-known written work is La meccanica del cervello (The Mechanism of the Brain) of 1920.

== Political career ==
Leonardo Bianchi's political career started in 1892 when he was appointed the role of deputy for San Bartolomeo in Galdo in the Italian Parliament. He was re-elected again as deputy for Montesarchio in 1897, where he was an activist for school and cultural reform. During his legislation, he advocated for various social reforms. He advocated for regulations of prostitution, especially in protecting minors, as well as advocating for prison reform. In 1904, he became well known for his asylum and hospital reform law. Some examples of Leonardo Bianchi's reform would be restructuring medical education to centre on doctor-patient relationship and the abolishment of straitjackets in asylums.

On March 28, 1905, Leonardo Bianchi was appointed to lead the Minister Department of Public Education by the King of Italy, which was presided over by Alessandro Fortis. His primary mission and goal as the leader of public education was to create radical reform of the Italian school system and organisation. He created the chair of experimental psychology and established each chair in all faculties and universities that had a literature and philosophy department. He created the chair of occupational diseases in Milan and the chair of criminal anthropology in Turin. For middle schools, he implemented reforms that centered on culture and illiteracy rates.

Although most of Leonardo Bianchi's political involvement and reform centred on the arts and science, he did place reforms and initiatives outside of this spectrum. He advocated for the construction of a railway that would connect Naples to Apulia and Molise regions all the way to the mountain areas of Samnite Apennines.

While continuing his political career, Leonardo Bianchi was able to combine his medical knowledge with his influence in politics. He worked with the Italian government to create policies that would help the fight against malaria, alcoholism, and syphilis. His efforts were successful in eradicating malaria from most Italian territories.

His influence in politics continued throughout the 1900s. In 1914, during World War I, Leonardo Bianchi favoured Italy's entry into the war. During the war, he helped with the organisation of military hospitals and veteran care. In 1916, when Paolo Boselli became the prime minister of Italy, Leonardo Bianchi was appointed to delegate social security and mental health reform. After the conclusion of World War I in 1919, King Vittorio Emanuele III appointed Leonardo Bianchi a lifetime position in the Italian Senate. It is said that this appointment was influenced by the invitation of Giovanni Giolitti.

Leonardo Bianchi's reform and policies were known to be liberal and on the democratic side. During his lifetime appointment as a senator, he strongly opposed Fascism. Unfortunately, due to his opposition to Fascism, Benito Mussolini prevented Leonardo Bianchi's candidacy for the Nobel Prize for Medicine, thus preventing his victory.

== Death ==
Leonardo Bianchi died on 13 February 1927, during a conference at the University of Naples from complications due to angina pectoris. To honour his memory, work, and contributions, the hospital where he was a previous director, the Provincial Asylum San Francesco di Sales in Naples, was renamed The Leonardo Bianchi Psychiatric Hospital. A monument was later created by artist Fulvio Rosapane in Leonardo Bianchi's hometown of San Bartolomeo in Galdo at the Piazza Municipio. Not much is known regarding Leonardo Bianchi's personal life.

== Work and contributions ==
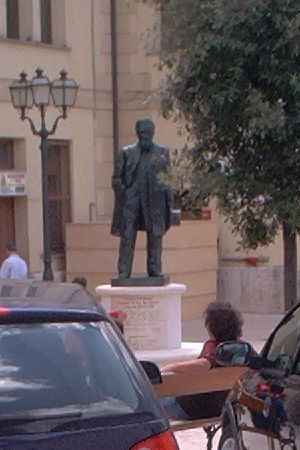
Statue of Bianchi by the artist Fulvio Rosapane on the Piazza Municipio in San Bartolomeo in Galdo

Bianchi is remembered for his studies and experiments of the frontal lobe. Most of his research was derived from experiments with monkeys and dogs after he had surgically removed (ablation) the animals' frontal lobe. He concluded from his experiments that the frontal lobe had more functionality than previously believed. He described the lobe as the centre of coordination and fusion of the incoming and outgoing products of the sensory and motor areas of the cortex. From his experiments, he showed the frontal lobe's role in "reminiscence, judgment and discrimination" and listed five areas of deficit due to frontal lobe ablation.

1. Loss of perceptive qualities, leading to defective attention and object recognition.
2. Reduced memory
3. Reduction in associative skills, inability to formulate the steps needed to reach a goal, along with the inability to perform complex tasks.
4. Altered emotional attachments, and drastic changes in social skills.
5. Disruption of focal consciousness, leading to apathy and distractibility

Along with his research on monkeys and dogs, Leonardo Bianchi conducted an analysis on military war victims who suffered from head traumas that limited their temporal and frontal lobe functions. From his analysis, he deduced that the frontal lobe is needed for mental thought processes and solving simple math problems. Bianchi's research was the first to describe frontal lobe syndrome, which helped to earn him fame in the academic world of Europe and the USA.

Other accomplishments of Leonardo Bianchi were that he was one of the first known medical doctors who diagnosed parietal syndrome, and he was the first president of the Italian Society of Neurology.

Leonardo Bianchi's fame in the neuropsychiatry world led to his appointment as editor of the International Journal of Medical Sciences in 1898. In 1904, Bianchi published one of his most famous publications titled the Treatise on Psychiatry which became a universal reference for psychiatry.

Leonardo Bianchi's publications had worldwide fame in the psychiatry field. His publications were translated into many languages, such as English. In his English-translated version of his Text-Book of Psychiatry, his work had three parts. Part one focused on the anatomy and physiology of the brain, part two dealt with the psychological aspects of insanity, and part three focused on the individual forms of mental disorder.

== Honours and nominations ==
Bianchi received many honours and nominations throughout his lifetime. During Bianchi's political career, he was honoured with the Grand Cross of the Mauritian Order by the King of Italy. Bianchi was also nominated seven times for the Nobel Prize in Medicine between 1910 and 1926.

Throughout his involvement in medicine and politics, he worked with various famous lecturers and politicians. Quotes regarding Leonardo Bianchi by these influential figures are seen from the quote by Louis Luzzatti below, who was the president of the council of ministers:

"High knowledge and very sweet character together give prominence to the noble figure of Leonardo Bianchi."

== See also ==
- Smith, Derek J. "Course Handout – From Frontal Lobe Syndrome to Dysexecutive Syndrome". Archived from the original on 16 July 2011.
- Leonardo Bianchi, La meccanica del cervello e la funzione dei lobi frontali, Torino (IT), F.lli Bocca Editori, 1920.
- Leonardo Bianchi, The mechanism of the brain and the function of the frontal lobes, Edinburgh (UK), Livingstone Publishing, Ltd., 1922.
