= Pasquale Lucio Scandizzo =

Italian economist, academic and author

- Education: Laurea in Agricultural Sciences; Specialization in Economics; MS in Agricultural and Resource Economics; PhD in Agriculture and Resource Economics: International Capital Movement and Economic Growth
- Alma mater: University of Naples; University of California, Berkeley

Pasquale Lucio Scandizzo is an Italian economist, academic and author. He is a Senior Economic Consultant for the World Bank, Senior Advisor of the International Renewable Energy Agency (IRENA), Senior Fellow of The Tor Vergata Foundation of the University of Rome Tor Vergata, Member of the Expert Committee of the Council of the Economy and Labor (CNEL), Scientific Director of OpenEconomics, and President of OpenEconomics International. He was a Senior Economic Advisor at the Ministry of Economics and Finance in Italy, in addition to holding positions as Professor of Economic and Financial Policy and Research Center Director at the University of Rome Tor Vergata and President of the Salerno Savings Bank Foundation.

Scandizzo is most known for his work in economic and social evaluation, impact assessment, and cost-benefit analysis of sustainable development and climate change projects. His publications comprise research articles and books, including The Agrictural Economy of Northeast Brazil, The New Generation of Computable General Equilibrium Models: Modeling the Economy and The COVID-19 Disruption and the Global Health Challenge. He was awarded the 2023 Jean-Paul Fitoussi Prize by the Italian Association of Development Economists (Società Italiana di Economia dello Sviluppo), of which he is also a member and past President.

== Education ==
Scandizzo earned a Laurea in Agricultural Sciences in 1965 and a Specialization in Economics in 1967 from the University of Naples, Italy. He later attended the University of California, Berkeley, obtaining an MS in Agricultural and Resource Economics in 1970 and a PhD with a thesis on international capital movement and economic growth in 1972.

== Career ==
Scandizzo joined the World Bank in the Bank Development Research Center in 1972, and he has been involved with the organization since then. During this time, he has led research programs in Africa, Latin America, and countries including Brazil, Mexico, and Indonesia, focusing on their economic policies and strategies and offering policy recommendations.

Scandizzo led a research project in Northeast Brazil, the findings of which laid the groundwork for the World Bank's investment program in land tenure and agrarian reform. From 1975 to 1987, he served as Senior Economist and Research Coordinator at the World Bank. During this period, he was also seconded to the Italian Government as a Senior Economic Advisor. He took on governmental roles in Italy, starting as Director of a task force aimed at implementing cost-benefit analysis within Italian Public Administration. He later served as Senior Advisor to the President of the Parliamentary Budget Committee, and to the Minister of the Budget, eventually being appointed as President of the Italian Institute for Economic Planning. His contributions also extended to positions on the National Planning Board and the Governing Board of the Italian Institute of Statistics.

Scandizzo began his academic career at the University of Cagliari in 1987, before moving in 1989 to the University of Rome Tor Vergata, where he held the chair of Economics and Financial Policy until 2012. He was the Director of the Centre for Economic and International Studies (CEIS). He has been a member of the Governing Board of the Tor Vergata Foundation, a branch of the university. He is a member of the advisory board of the foundation, presiding over an international research program and the Villa Mondragone Development Association activities.

Scandizzo is a co-founder and board member of the International Consortium of Applied Bioeconomy Research (ICABR), as well as the co-founder of OpenEconomics and President of its affiliate OpenEconomics International, a consultancy group specializing in economic policy and project design.

== Research and publications ==
Scandizzo has contributed to the field of economics by studying economic development, real options theory, computable general equilibrium models, and the evaluation of risk and uncertainty. Throughout his career, he has published books and reports on the economic growth and development of several countries and regions of the world such as Kenya, Mauritius, and the Yucatán Peninsula.

=== Economic development and policy analysis ===
In an article co-authored with John Dillon and published in the American Journal of Agricultural Economics, Scandizzo reported on a study employing mind games techniques to assess how subsistence farmers in Northeast Brazil respond to the pervasive uncertainties of their environment. Building on his research findings in the area, he published other articles and the volume The Agricultural Economy of Northeast Brazil. This book encapsulated the findings of his research project and farm level surveys in the region, exploring its agricultural challenges and opportunities, and evaluating the effects of policies on productivity, sustainability, and rural development.

In collaboration with Vincenzo Atella, Scandizzo published the book The COVID-19 Disruption and the Global Health Challenge, reporting on a study on the genesis and impact of the pandemic on the global economy. Both in the book and related studies, he has addressed the new One Health paradigm, considering health as a peculiar common good, a global resource that intersects human behavior and social choices in a complex and pervasive way.

=== Cost benefit analysis ===
Cost-benefit analysis is a central theme in much of Scandizzo's research and contributions to professional practices. He has developed and applied methodologies that enhance the accuracy and reliability of economic evaluations.

=== Risk and uncertainty evaluation ===
Scandizzo examined the significant effects of government market interventions on agricultural efficiency, trade, investment, employment, and income distribution in developing countries, using various methodologies across six country case studies. Alongside Colin Bruce and Ernst Lutz, he found that government intervention in agricultural commodity markets in developing countries often heavily taxes the sector, discourages production, subsidizes consumption, and negatively impacts foreign exchange earnings.

In a study published in the American Journal of Agricultural Economics, Scandizzo assessed how rational expectations in agricultural production affect market efficiency under risk, demonstrating that competitive market equilibria can be simulated in sector wide mathematical programming models, and illustrated these concepts using a linear programming model for a subsector in Mexico. He also presented a method for solving agricultural sector models under risk to achieve competitive outputs and prices, by using a quadratic programming problem and suggesting linearization techniques for practical solutions. In further studies, conducted in collaboration with Odin Knudsen, published in the American Journal of Agricultural Economics, as well as in other journals, he explored the possibility of incorporating social demand and supply in cost-benefit analysis, by taking into account of externalities, but remaining within the framework of a market economy.

Together with Peter B.R. Hazell and Jock Anderson, Scandizzo co-authored Risky Agricultural Markets: Price Forecasting and the Need for Intervention Policies discussing how farmers' decisions influence agricultural market efficiency through price-yield correlation in forecasts, proposing policies like production quotas and price stabilization to address market inefficiencies. Additionally, he analyzed risk attitudes among small farm owners and sharecroppers in Brazil using choice experiments, finding that most subsistence farmers are risk-averse, with variations influenced by income levels and other socioeconomic factors.

=== Real options ===
Scandizzo originated innovations in option theory, applying the concept of value of waiting under uncertainty to various types of non-standard transactions, such as concessions, carbon trading, extortions, and imitators-innovators interaction. In a series of studies co-authored with Odin Knudsen and Marco Ventura, he introduced the concept of liability option, defined as the liability counterpart of the usual waiting option, which arises when the exercise of a real option on the part of its holder implies a threat for a different party.

=== Climate change and economic policy ===
Scandizzo emphasized the importance of understanding and developing methods to mitigate the effects of climate change on the economy. In the book Adapting to Climate Changes: How to Evaluate Strategies and Projects, he explored the theoretical aspects of climate change adaptation, distinguishing between adaptation and adaptability, advocating strategies to enhance adaptive capacity as crucial capital and contingent wealth. He presented a new method for making robust policy decisions under high uncertainty, using option value techniques to identify economically beneficial choices across different scenarios, demonstrated through a pilot exercise in Campeche.

=== Computable general equilibrium models ===
In an article co-authored with Roger Norton and published in Operation Research, Scandizzo introduced a method for solving computable general equilibrium (CGE) models using linear programming, adaptable to market controls and distortions, and suitable for both general and non-general equilibrium scenarios. The insights and techniques from this article have been further developed in subsequent works, some of which are documented in a volume (co-edited with Federico Perali), "The New Generation of Computable General Equilibrium Models: Modeling the Economy." This book discusses the evolution of CGE models, covering their theory, applications, methodological advancements, and case studies. In subsequent contributions, the same authors have presented an analysis that integrates Dynamic Stochastic General Equilibrium (DSGE) models with Computable General Equilibrium (CGE) models to evaluate policy interventions and explore economic-environmental trade-offs, emphasizing capital dynamics and scarcity indicators for sustainable development.

== Awards and honors ==
- 2023 – Jean-Paul Fitoussi Prize, Italian Association of Development Economists

== Bibliography ==
=== Selected books ===
- The Agricultural Economy of Northeast Brazil (1980) ISBN 978-0-801-82581-1
- Adapting to Climate Changes: How to evaluate Strategies and Projects (2010) ISBN 978-3-639-11784-4
- The New Generation of Computable General Equilibrium Models: Modeling the Economy (2018) ISBN 978-3-319-58532-1
- Risky Agricultural Markets: Price Forecasting and the Need for Intervention Policies (2019) ISBN 978-0-367-28615-6
- The COVID-19 Disruption and the Global Health Challenge (2023) ISBN 978-0-443-18576-2

=== Selected articles ===
- Hazell, P. B. R., & Scandizzo, P. L. (1974). Competitive demand structures under risk in agricultural linear programming models. American Journal of Agricultural Economics, 56(2), 235–244.
- Hazell, P. B. R., & Scandizzo, P. L. (1975). Market intervention policies when production is risky. American Journal of Agricultural Economics, 57(4), 649–682.
- Dillon, J. L., & Scandizzo, P. L. (1978). Risk attitudes of subsistence farmers in Northeast Brazil: A sampling approach. American Journal of Agricultural Economics, 60(3), 425–435.
- Lutz, E., & Scandizzo, P. L. (1980). Price distortions in developing countries: A bias against agriculture. European Review of Agricultural Economics, 7(1), 5-27.
- Scandizzo, P. L., & Knudsen, O. K. (1980). The evaluation of the benefits of basic need policies. American Journal of Agricultural Economics, 62(1), 46–57.
- Diakosavvas, D., & Scandizzo, P. L. (1991). Trends in the terms of trade of primary commodities, 1900-1982: the controversy and its origins. Economic Development and Cultural Change, 39(2), 231–264.
- Scandizzo, P. L., & Knudsen, O. (1996). Social supply and the evaluation of food policies. American Journal of Agricultural Economics, 78(1), 137–145.
- Scandizzo, P. L., & Knudsen, O. (2010). Risk and regulation compliance with tradable permits under dynamic uncertainty. European Journal of Law and Economics.
- Scandizzo, P. L., & Ventura, M. (2010). Sharing risk through concession contracts. European Journal of Operational Research, 207(1), 363–370.
- Scandizzo, P. L., & Knudsen, O. K. (2024). The New Normalcy and the Pandemic Threat: A Real Option Approach. Journal of Risk and Financial Management, 17(2), 72.
