= Giuseppe Zaccagnino =

Italian diplomat and art collector

Giuseppe Zaccagnino (born June 28, 1945) is an Italian diplomat and art collector.

== Early life ==
He was born in Potenza, Italy in 1945. He went to Rome University and graduated in Law from the University of Naples in March 1968. He passed the Bar examination and qualified to practice law.

He attended the Johns Hopkins University, (The Johns Hopkins University SAIS Bologna Center), which prepares graduates for professional careers in international affairs.

== Career ==
He served in many offices, including the foreign affairs spokesman's office and foreign minister's office, and also as assistant to several deputy foreign ministers.

After having served in various positions in Zagreb, (Croatia, former Yugoslavia) and Ottawa, (Ontario, Canada), he was appointed as Consul General to Boston and New England from 1987 to 1991. From 1991 to 1995 he served as Consul General to Casablanca, Morocco. In 1993 he was named Consul General to Scotland and Northern Ireland, (Edinburgh).

Later in 2003 he was posted as Consul General to Mumbai, former Bombay.

== Personal life ==
Giuseppe Zaccagnino is art collector and antique prints' expert.
