= University of Naples Federico II =

University and academic publisher

- Università degli Studi di Napoli Federico II
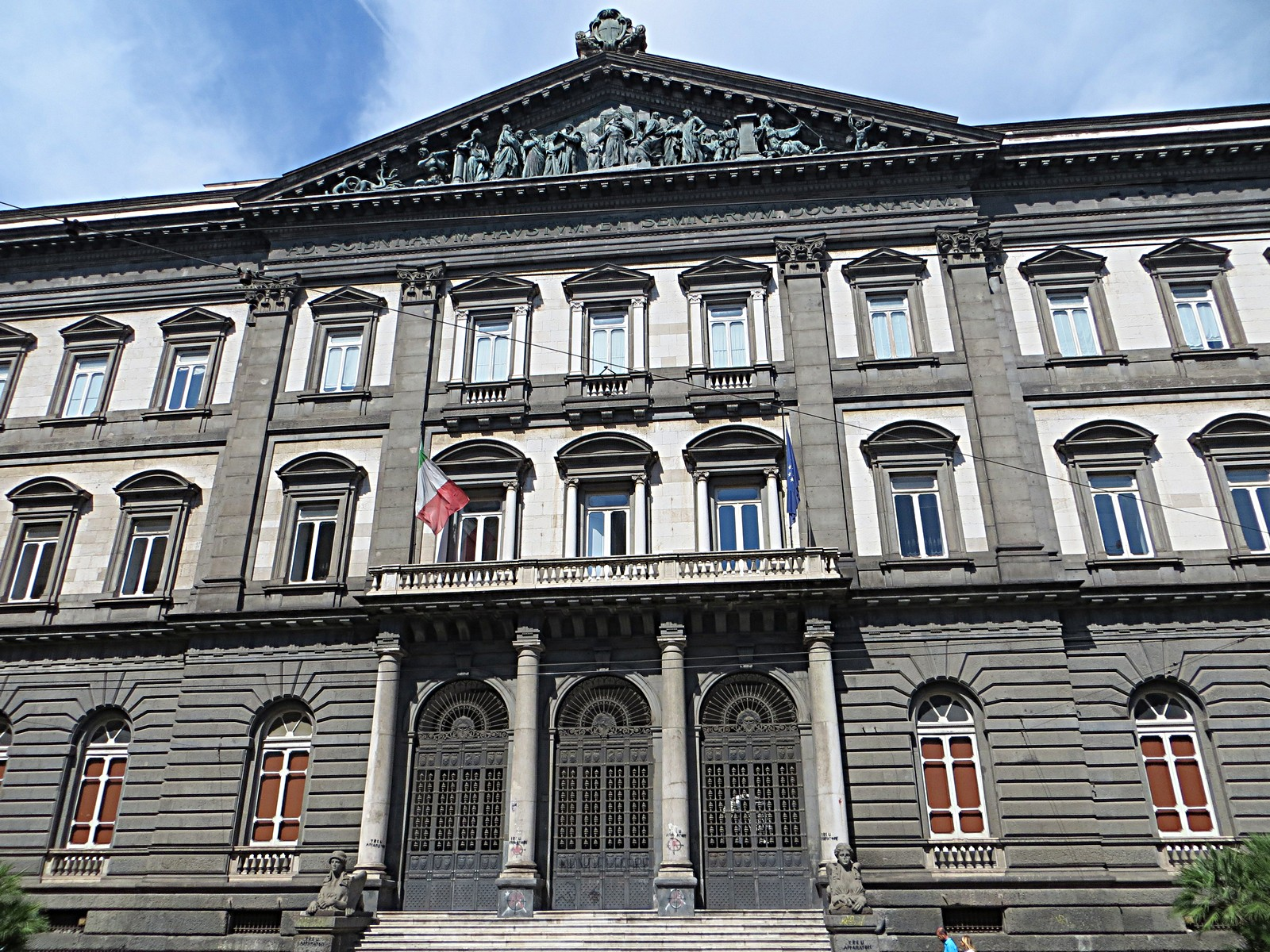
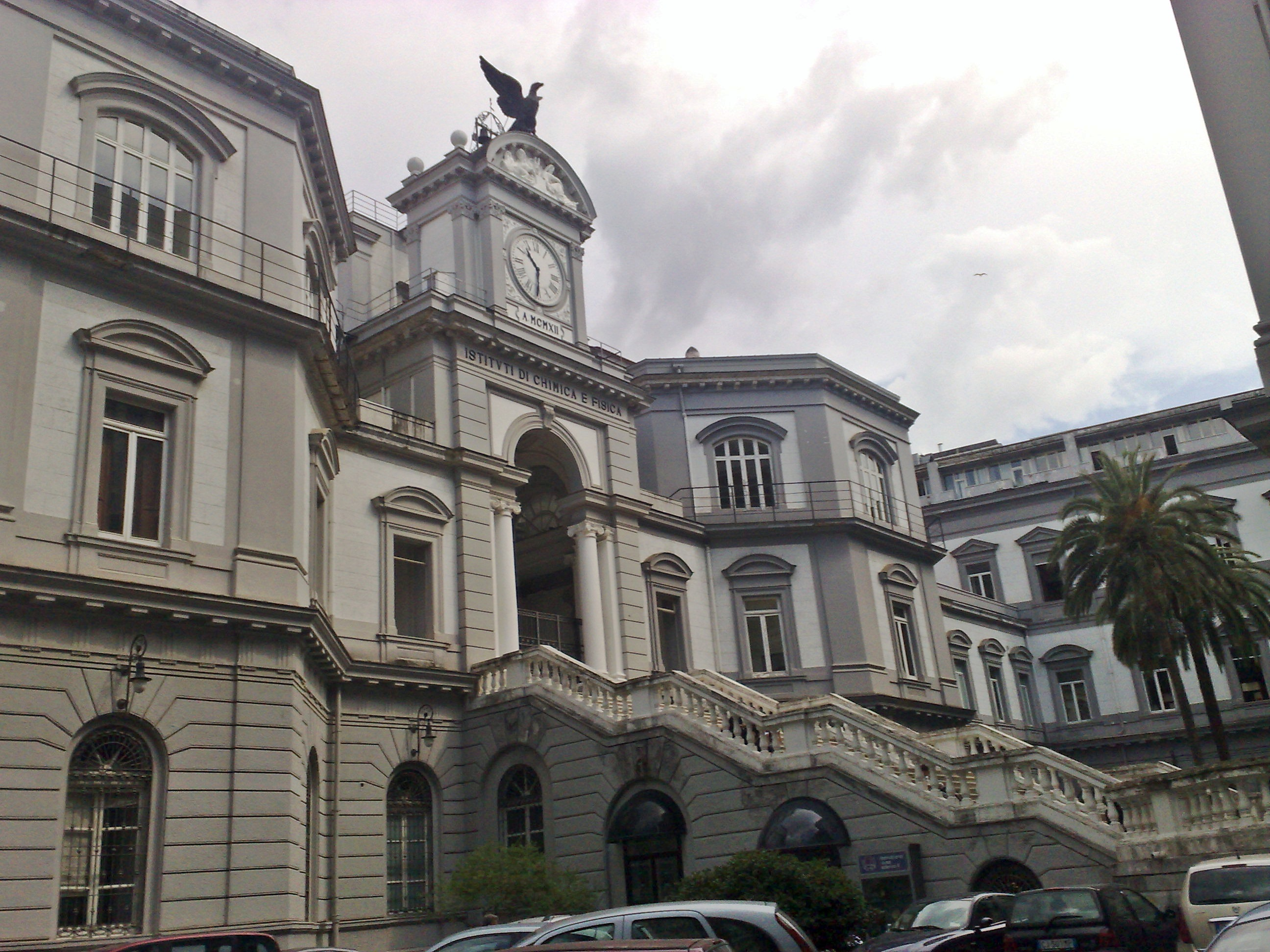
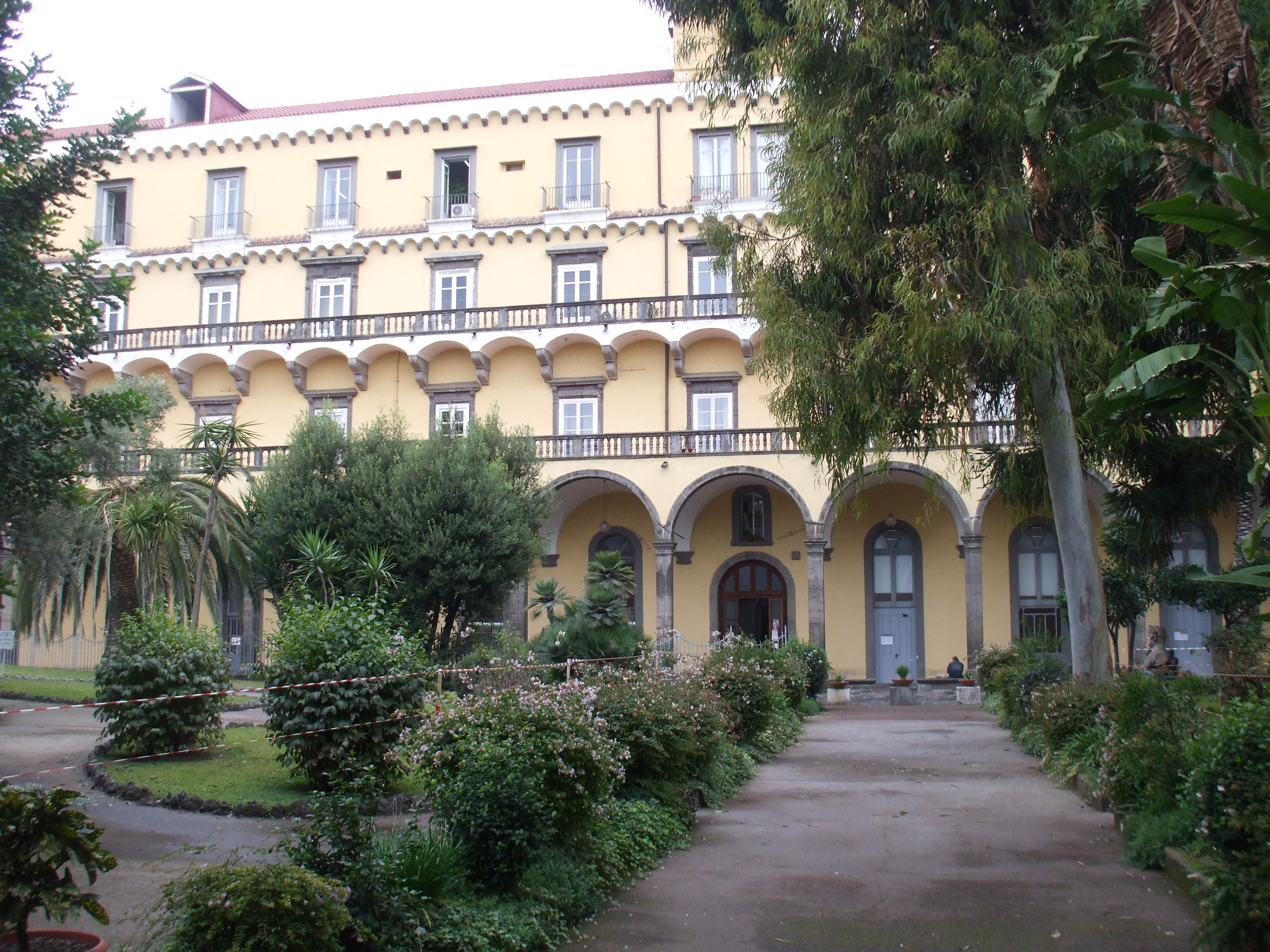
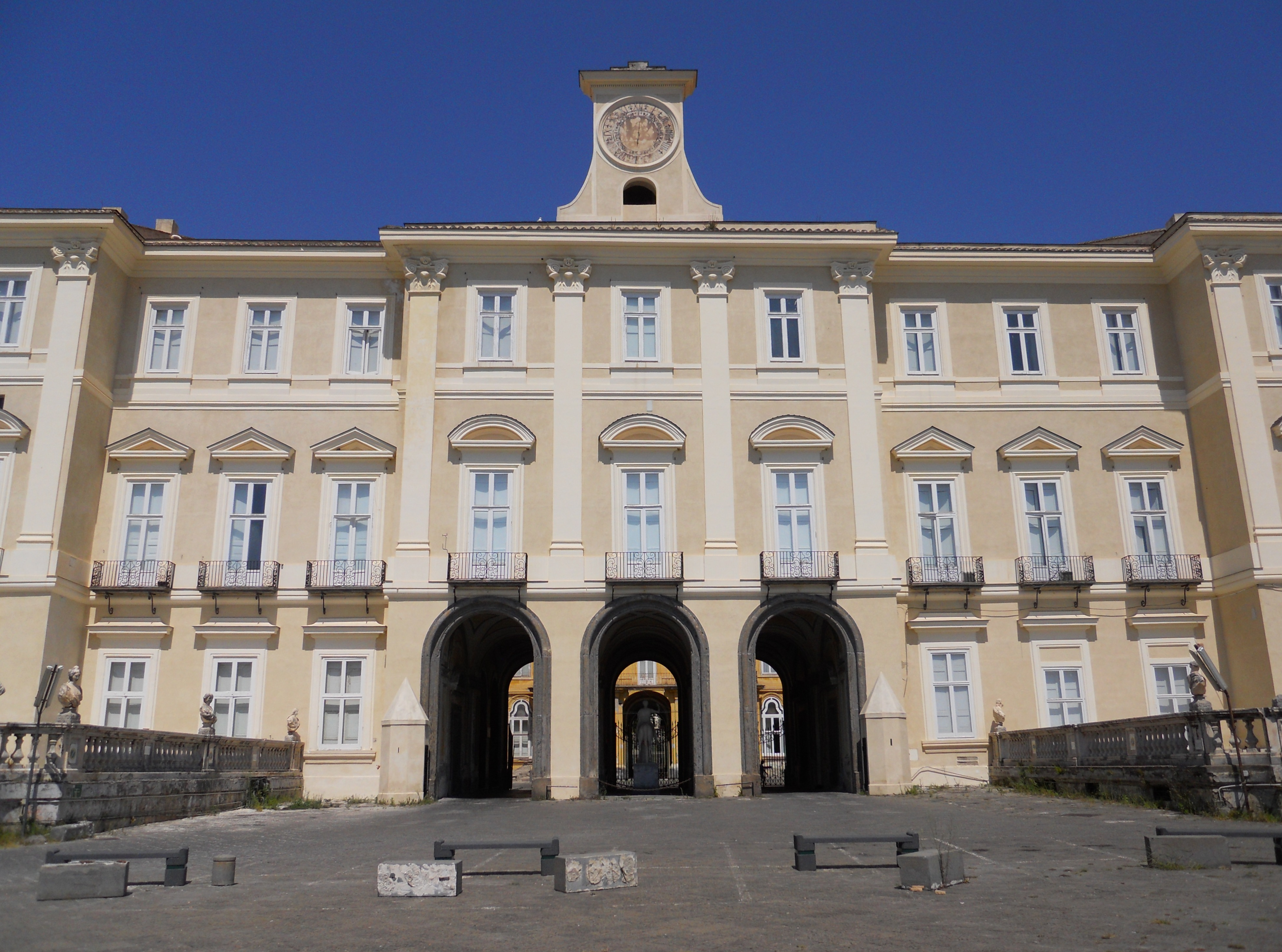
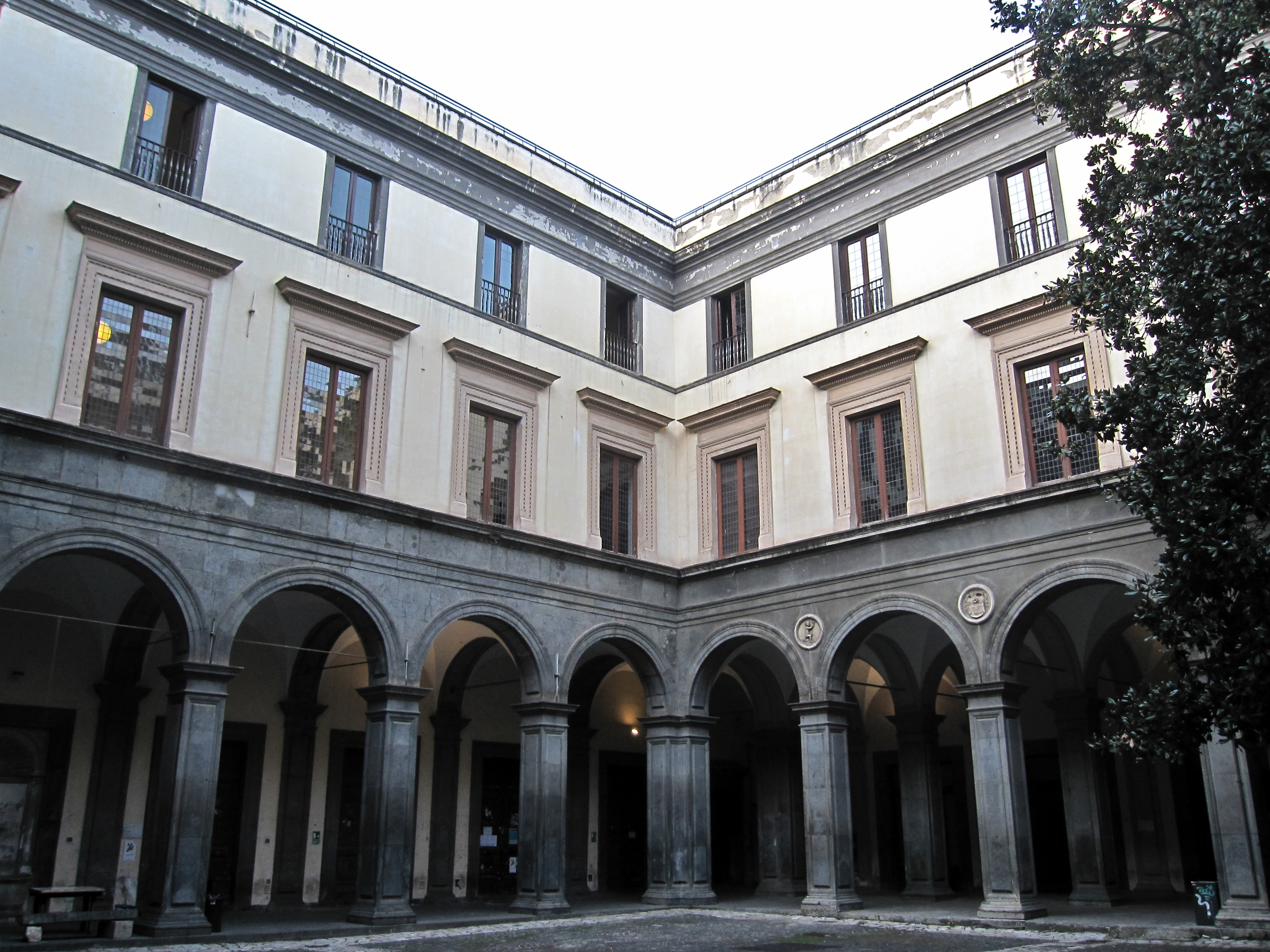
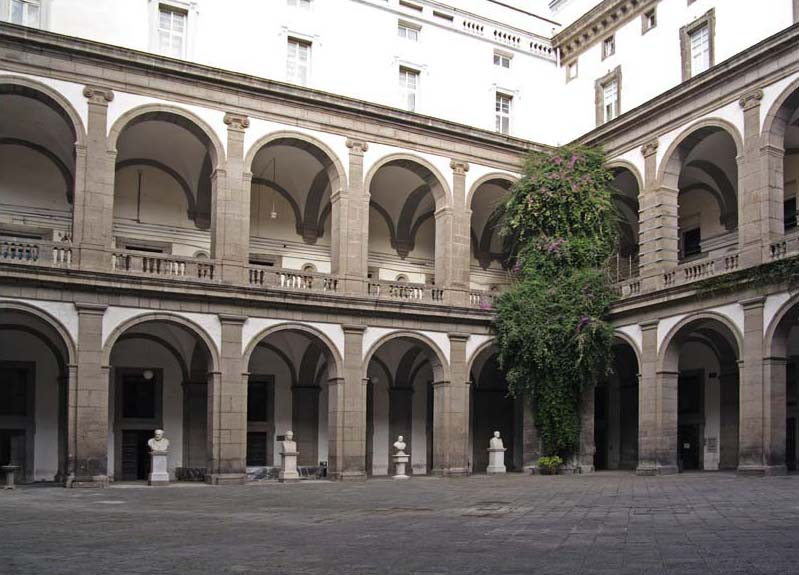
- Latin: Universitas Neapolitana
- Former name: Università di Napoli
- Motto: Latin: Ad Scientiarum Haustum et Seminarium Doctrinarum
- Motto in English: For the inculcation of the sciences and the dissemination of knowledge
- Type: Public research university
- Established: 5 June 1224; 802 years ago
- Founder: Frederick II, Holy Roman Emperor
- Affiliations: Campus Europae, UNIMED, PEGASUS, Aurora, BioGeM
- Endowment: €473 million
- Rector: Andrea Mazzucchi
- Administrative staff: 6,185 (2022)
- Students: 71,799 (2022)
- Undergraduates: 42,287
- Postgraduates: 29,512
- Location: Naples, Campania, Italy
- Campus: University town
- Sports teams: CUS Napoli
- Colours
- Website: unina.it

The University of Naples Federico II (Italian: Università degli Studi di Napoli Federico II, pronounced [univerˈsita ˈdeʎʎi ˈstudi di ˈnaːpoli fedeˈriːko seˈkondo]) is a public research university in Naples, Campania, Italy. Established in 1224 and named after its founder, Frederick II, it is the oldest public, non-denominational, non-sectarian and state-funded university in Italy and the world, and one of the world's ten oldest universities in continuous operation.

It was Europe's first university dedicated to training secular administrative staff, and is one of the world's oldest academic institutions in continuous operation. With over 90,000 students (2022) it is among the largest universities in Europe, long the only state university in Naples, until the establishment of the University of Campania Luigi Vanvitelli in 1991, formerly Seconda Università di Napoli.

The motto of the university is Ad scientiarum haustum et seminarium doctrinarum, taken from the circular letter of Frederick II. Over the course of its thousand-year history, Federico II alumni have included the presidents of the Italian Republic Enrico De Nicola, Giovanni Leone and Giorgio Napolitano. Additionally, students and alumni have won 2 Academy Awards.

In October 2016, the university hosted the first ever Apple iOS Developer Academy and in 2018 the Cisco Digital Transformation Lab. It occupies the second position among the major universities (> 40,000 students) of the Italian universities system (third position if the online Pegaso University, also from Naples, is included).

== History ==
The university of Naples Federico II was founded by the king of Sicily and Holy Roman Emperor Frederick II on 5 June 1224. It is the world's oldest state-supported institution of higher education and research. One of the most famous students was Roman Catholic theologian and philosopher Thomas Aquinas.

=== Founding: Political project of Frederick II ===
Frederick II had specific objectives when he founded the university in Naples: first, to train administrative and skilled bureaucratic professionals for the curia regis (the kingdom's ministries and governing apparatus), as well as preparing lawyers and judges who would help the sovereign to draft laws and administer justice. Second, he wanted to facilitate the cultural development of promising young students and scholars, avoiding any unnecessary and expensive trips abroad: by creating a State University, Emperor Frederick avoided having young students during his reign complete their training at the University of Bologna, which was in a city that was hostile to the imperial power.

The University of Naples was arguably the first to be formed from scratch by a higher authority, not based upon an already-existing private school. Although its claim to be the first state-sponsored university can be challenged by Palencia (which was founded by the Castilian monarch c.1212), Naples certainly was the first chartered one.

Frederick, by the grace of God Emperor of the Romans ever Augustus and King of Sicily [...] to all the faithful of the Kingdom of Sicily who read this letter.

With the favor of God, [...] we desire that in every part of our Kingdom many become wise and prudent by drawing from the fountain of sciences and a nursery of knowledge, [...] We therefore decree that in the most delightful city of Naples, arts shall be taught and studies cultivated in connection with every profession, so that those hungry and famished for knowledge may find in our Kingdom means to satisfy their desires and not be compelled, in pursuit of knowledge, to wander and beg in foreign lands. [...]

The conditions we offer to students are as follows: firstly, that in said city there shall be doctors and masters in every faculty. The students, then, no matter where they come from, shall be assured of lodging, staying, and returning without suffering any harm to their person or property. The best accommodations in the city shall be rented to scholars for a maximum fee of two ounces of gold, and this amount shall not be exceeded. [...] Loans shall be granted to students, based on their needs, by those designated for this purpose upon the pledge of books, which shall be temporarily returned upon receipt of the guarantee of other students. [...]

— Frederick II, Holy Roman Emperor, Circular letter, Syracuse, Sicily, 5 June 1224, XII indiction.

Through a circular letter, the Emperor firmly invited all students to journey to Naples before September 29 (the feast day of Saint Michael the Archangel), a date that became customary for the commencement of the academic year. This letter was transmitted through the collection of letters attributed to Pier della Vigna, who served as the emperor's prime minister. In an era when students typically paid their own instructors, at the Frederickian university from its inception, the teachers were compensated by the emperor; the students were protected and supported, and deserving ones could avail themselves of honor loans and accommodations.

The choice of Naples as the location was not only due to cultural reasons (the city had a long-standing tradition in this regard, linked to the figure of Virgil, explicitly referenced in a document of the time), but also for geographic and economic considerations (maritime trade and transport, the mild climate, and the strategic position within the Kingdom were primarily decisive). For the organization of the Studium, the expertise of two eminent Campanian jurists, Pier della Vigna and Taddeo da Sessa, was enlisted.

For the new university to compete with older ones, Frederick II forbade citizens of the kingdom from attending foreign universities, particularly the University of Bologna, under the threat of corporal and pecuniary sanctions. At the same time, educational institutions within the kingdom were not allowed to offer courses in the same disciplines taught by the University of Naples, leading to the closure of several of these schools.

The artificiality of its creation posed great difficulties in attracting students; Thomas Aquinas was one of the few who came in these early years. Those years were further complicated by the long existence, in nearby Salerno, of Europe's most prestigious medical faculty, the Schola Medica Salernitana. The fledgling faculty of medicine at Naples had little hope of competing with it, and in 1231 the right of examination was surrendered to Salerno. The establishment of new faculties of theology and law under papal sponsorship in Rome in 1245 further drained Naples of students, as Rome was a more attractive location. In an effort to revitalize the dwindling university, in 1253, all the remaining schools of the university of Naples moved to Salerno, in the hope of creating a single viable university for the south. But that experiment failed and the university (minus medicine) moved back to Naples in 1258 (in some readings, Naples was "refounded" in 1258 by Manfred Hohenstaufen, as by this time there were hardly any students left). The Angevin reforms after 1266 and the subsequent decline of Salerno gave the University of Naples a new lease on life and put it on a stable, sustainable track.

Frederick II's political-university objective was not limited to the training of suitable officials for the state service, but also encompassed the creation of a broad intellectual elite capable of consolidating the Empire through legal elements as well as cultural contributions.

The Studium was organized in an original manner, different from the so-called Bolognese or Parisian model of the university. It was a closed institution with very strict rules. Students and professors were forbidden from leaving its walls. This type of university organization was also adopted in some Spanish universities.

The original location of the University of Naples remains uncertain, but it is hypothesized to have been situated in the region of Nido, next to the Church of San Marco and the Monastery of Donna Romita. During the reign of Charles I, several reforms were introduced in the organization of the university, including the establishment of the Magistrate of the students and the introduction of new academic titles. The chairs were defined more clearly, becoming six: Medicine, Canon Law, Civil Law, Theology, Grammar, and Logic. During the reign of Charles I of Anjou, the University of Naples saw the presence of important figures such as Andrea and Bartolomeo da Capua, Andrea Bonello, Filippo da Castrocoeli, and St. Thomas Aquinas, the latter being the beneficiary of a monthly subsidy granted by the King. Others like Giacomo Belvisio, Andrea d'Isernia, and Arnaldo di Villanova were also renowned under his successor.

However, periods of political instability and the Spanish conquest brought turmoil once again to the university. Ferdinand the Catholic sold the office of Magistrate of the students to the city, and Viceroys abolished the students' exemption privileges. Despite attempts at reform, abuses persisted, and the university failed to regain its reputation.

=== From the 13th to the 16th century ===
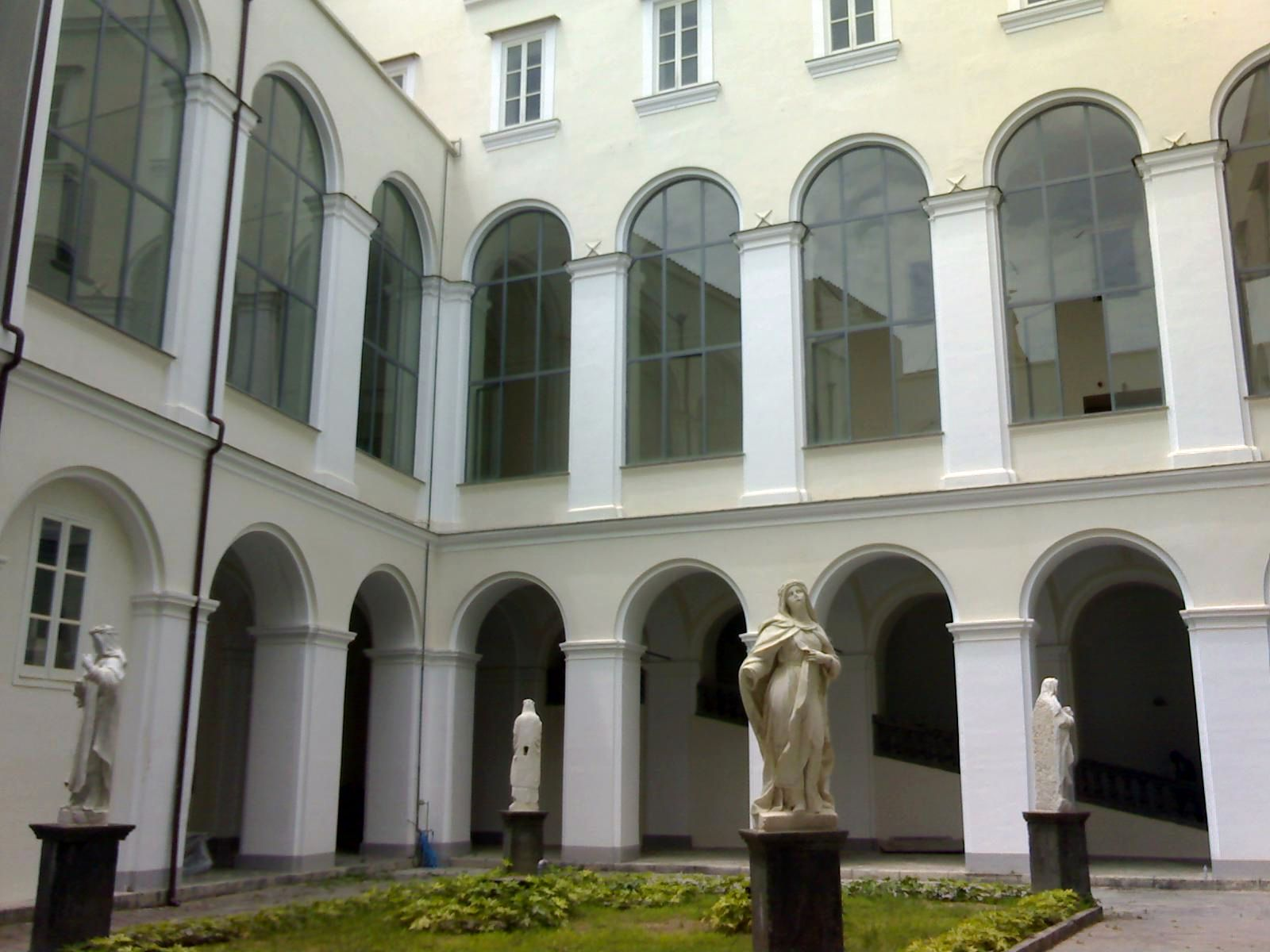
The Cloister of San Domenico Maggiore, "Courtyard of the Statues".

Initially the studies were directed towards law (fundamental for the formation of jurists), the liberal arts, medicine and theology: the latter, compared to other subjects, was taught in religious institutions, in particular in the convent of San Domenico Maggiore, where Thomas Aquinas taught from 1271 to 1274.

During the Angevin period (1265–1443) the structure and organization of the university remained substantially unchanged.

In 1443, with the advent of Aragonese rule, the university was closed for about twenty years. In 1465 it was reopened until 1490. From 1443 to 1501, the humanities became the primary focus of higher education in Naples (until then, clerical subjects had been the priority). Only from 1507 did the university enjoy a more lasting serenity, remaining definitively open in the Monastery of San Domenico Maggiore.

=== From the 16th to the 19th century ===
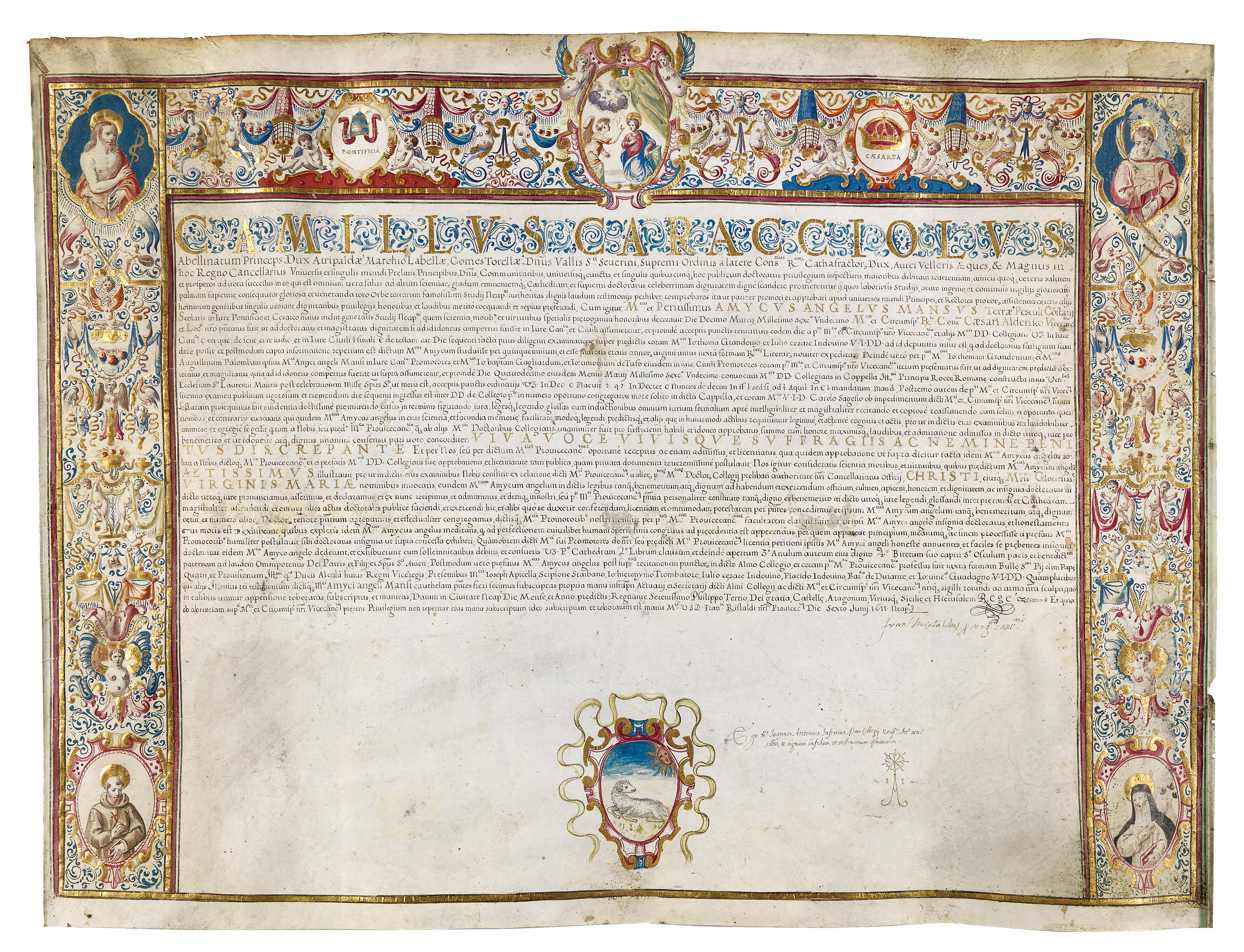
Certificate of admission to the Doctoral College of the University of Naples for Amycus Angelus Mansus, Master and Doctor of Law. Naples, June 6, 1611.

After the arrival of the Spaniards in the early sixteenth century, the University of Naples was no longer subject to suspensions and closures, except for brief interruptions due to riots, epidemics, and famines. However, its conditions remained precarious, without a stable headquarters and with some of the lowest salaries in Italy and Europe. Royal absolutism and the Church's fears regarding the spread of religious reform movements generated a climate of tight control over cultural institutions. A papal bull in 1564 imposed on all professors and doctors of the university the oath of fidelity to the Catholic faith.

Towards the end of the 16th century or the beginning of the 17th, a dispute arose with the University of Salerno regarding medical degrees, which attracted many students thanks to benefits such as the lack of obligation to enroll or attend classes for several years. The Princes of Avellino were among the main supporters of the University of Naples, obtaining the hereditary privilege of Grand Chancellor. However, the desertion of young doctors caused problems.

Since 1616, the university headquarters were located in the Palazzo dei Regi Studi (now home to the National Archaeological Museum of Naples), a building that was once a cavalry barracks, specially renovated by the architect Giulio Cesare Fontana on the orders of Don Pedro Fernández de Castro, count of Lemos and viceroy of Naples. In 1618, Viceroy Ossuna added the oath of allegiance to the Immaculate Conception.

Pyotr Andreyevich Tolstoy, during his visit to Naples in 1698, stated in one of his works:

The academy [the University] was built with public funds, namely royal funds, very spacious, with 120 large rooms, both lower and upper, divided into five floors. In these rooms, one studies from philosophy to theology, other higher sciences, and anatomy. In that academy, there are more than 4000 students, all studying free of charge, and any remuneration goes to the royal masters. In the same academy, a special room has been created for discussions and testimonies of students: those who complete their studies are testified by the discussions in the aforementioned room. Near that room, there is another one dedicated to anatomy; it is not large and is built according to the conventions for anatomy. In this academy in Naples, there are 400 doctors, physicians, pharmacists, and medical professionals with 2000 people. They all live free of charge, nourished by the science of the Neapolitan viceroy, and of the princes, and counts, and dukes, and marquises, and nobles, and merchants, and of every kind of Neapolitan resident.

— Pyotr Andreyevich Tolstoy

During the 17th century the university experienced, like other European universities, a long period of decline, so that private schools and ecclesiastical colleges began to arise in Naples, which gradually joined it, taking away space from it. Only starting from the 18th century, first with the Habsburgs and then with the Bourbons, did the university receive a great boost in a positive sense from the authorities: it was in this period that the philosopher Giambattista Vico taught at the Neapolitan University. The situation of the university improved slightly thanks to the reform attempts of the Austrian Viceroys and the patronage of the Barons, but the proposed reforms encountered political obstacles. With the arrival of Charles III of Bourbon, some reforms were implemented, but the expulsion of the Jesuits caused new difficulties. The major innovations of those years were the creation in 1735 of the chair of Astronomy and in 1754 of the first chair of mechanics and commerce, or political economy, in the world, the first entrusted to Pietro di Martino and the second to Antonio Genovesi).

In 1777 the headquarters were transferred to the House of the Savior, where the Collegio Massimo of the Jesuits had previously resided, following the dissolution and expulsion of the religious order at the behest of King Ferdinand IV of Bourbon. Throughout the second half of the 18th century, the university became the fulcrum of the culture of the Bourbon kingdom, also because there were many professors (including Antonio Genovesi) who lived fully in the Enlightenment environment. From there began the movement of intellectuals that gave rise to the uprisings of 1799 and the (brief) existence of the Parthenopean Republic.

Even during the French decade (1806–1815) there were works of modernization in the cultural field. First of all, the university experienced a radical change: it was divided into five faculties ( Literature and Philosophy, Mathematics and Physics, Medicine, Law, Theology ); the first Italian chair of Zoology and the first of Comparative anatomy was established; the astronomical observatory, the botanical garden and the mineralogy and zoology museums were connected to the university and directed by university professors. Despite this, private schools made a comeback, becoming the backbone of education in southern Italy from the Conservative Order until the unification of Italy. For this reason, the University of Naples suffered serious consequences when, after the birth of the Kingdom of Italy, it had to comply with the Casati law, revealing strong disparities compared to other Italian universities, precisely due to the numerous private institutes competitors. Thanks to specific laws, aimed at standardizing Italian universities, such as the decree law of 30 May 1875 (issued by Ruggiero Bonghi) and the Regulation of 1876 (issued by Michele Coppino), the Neapolitan university managed to break down these differences, already highlighted in 1860 by the general director of Public Education Francesco De Sanctis, who contributed energetically to its modernization.

In 1806, with the Decree of 31 October, the government and administration of the University of Naples were reformed and entrusted to a Prefect, a Council, and an Administrator, all directly appointed by the king. The Prefect, replacing the Rector, had a primarily ceremonial role and served for no more than three years. Their responsibilities included presiding over the acts of the university and receiving the accounts from the administrator to transmit them to the Ministry of the Interior. The council, composed of six members and the Deputies of the Faculties, was tasked with regulating studies, proposing reforms to the king, and conferring academic degrees after examinations. The role of the Councilors was mainly honorary. The Administrator, chosen from the Professors, was the only one to receive a monthly salary and was responsible for managing the finances of the university, overseeing discipline, and making payments to teachers and staff. Over the years, various reforms were proposed, including direct government control over public education and the creation of a Director, a Rector, and a Public Education Council. However, in 1822 and 1848, further changes to the organization were made, including the creation of new commissions and the replacement of the General Council of Public Education. These reforms continued until 1860 when a Provisional Commission of Public Education definitively replaced the General Council, marking another phase in the administration of education in Naples.

The Faculty of Theology was abolished in 1861. In 1869, the Scuola Normale Superiore of Naples was founded with the aim of training professors for secondary schools, offering complementary courses and lectures. Students had to pass an entrance examination and were divided into two sections: Humanities and Philosophy, and Mathematical and Natural Sciences. Some students from the university were admitted automatically, later becoming professors in state high schools.

Thanks to specific laws aimed at standardizing Italian universities, such as the decree-law of 30 May 1875 (issued by Ruggero Bonghi) and the Regulation of 1876 (issued by Michele Coppino), the University of Naples managed to overcome such diversities, already highlighted in 1860 by the Director General of Public Education, Francesco de Sanctis, who energetically contributed to its modernization.

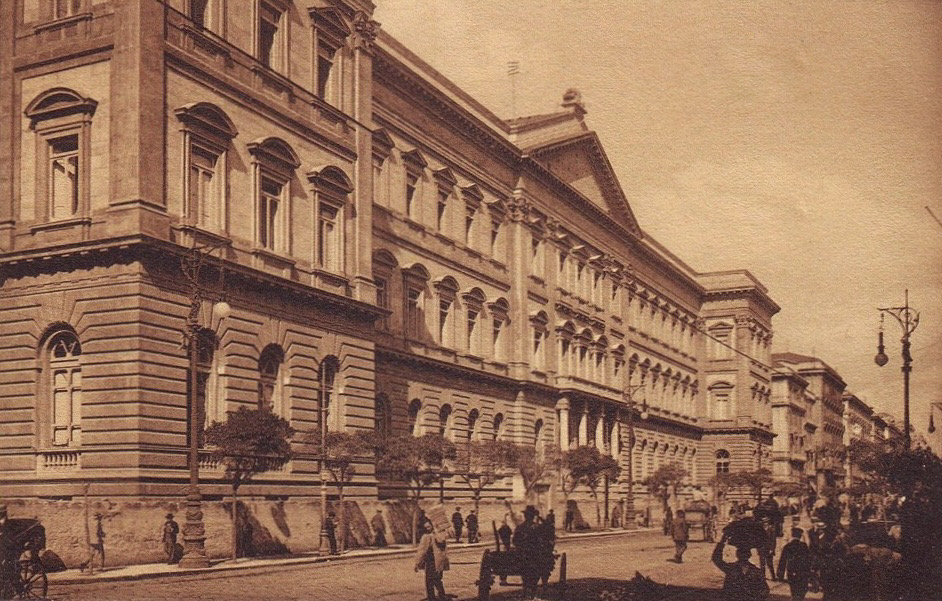
The Headquarters at the end of the 19th century.

Although the student population multiplied, bringing it to third place in Europe, after Berlin and Vienna, the buildings available to the university were lacking and sometimes not adequate (in fact, most of them were converted former convents). In 1884, after a violent cholera epidemic, the structure of the House of the Savior being now inadequate, the university was moved, thanks to urban renewal initiatives, to the new location in Corso Umberto I, where it still resides.

However, as stated by the rector Luigi Miraglia in 1896, the implementation of such law failed to fully meet the needs of the Faculty of Medicine. The condition of the scientific institutes, confined in cramped premises and lacking the necessary resources for their development, had become unsustainable. Even the library and teachings, which did not require specific spaces like laboratories, were facing serious difficulties due to the limited available space.

In its first session on 19 July 1805, the Chamber of Deputies approved a resolution regarding the reorganization of the University of Naples, recognizing the urgent need for state intervention to improve its deteriorating conditions. The Government, supported by the Commission, agreed to present a bill to reform the university's building, already promising a contribution of two million lire to be distributed over six years. The University of Naples was in a degraded state, with crumbling and inadequate buildings for its student population. Various education ministers had recognized the need for renovation, but the financial and technical situation posed challenges. After unsuccessful attempts, it was decided to entrust the drafting of a new project to the engineers who had worked on the previous one. This new project, estimated at 4,420,000 lire, was approved by the Ministry of Education and subsequently by the Superior Council of Public Works. The agreement between the Government and the provinces involved, including Naples, envisaged that the work would be financed with contributions from both state and local authorities. The advance payment of state expenses, provided in ten annual installments, was to be proportional to the contributions of the other entities involved. Despite financial difficulties, the work was considered of vital importance for the scientific and cultural progress of the country. The agreement also envisaged the participation of the provinces of Chieti and Campobasso, although they were not yet officially involved. However, it was hoped that they would contribute in the future, thus reducing the financial burden on the State. To cover the total estimated cost of the agreement, amounting to 6,800,000 lire, funds from land sales, withdrawals from recovery funds, and contributions from the Municipality of Naples and the Bank of Naples were envisaged. The bill presented to Parliament reflected the long and laborious negotiation between the Government and the parties involved, seeking to balance financial interests with the cultural and scientific importance of the project.

Towards the end of the 19th century, the Faculty of Medicine, constantly complaining about the lack of adequate facilities, convinced the Government to establish a Commission whose report led to the promulgation of the law of 16 July 1882. This law authorized the expenditure of 850,000 lire for the transfer and adaptation of the clinics and facilities of the Medical Faculty of the Royal University of Naples to the former convents of Santa Patrizia and Sant'Andrea delle Dame. Thanks to this law, the buildings of Santa Patrizia and Sant'Andrea delle Dame were acquired, and the renovation works were initiated and completed. In 1887, it was possible to inaugurate in Sant'Andrea the premises intended for the Ophthalmological Clinic, the Obstetric Clinic, the General Pathology Cabinet, the Institute of Physiology, and the Institute of Pharmacology. In Santa Patrizia, the works to accommodate the first and second Medical Clinics, the Surgical Clinic, and the Medical and Surgical Special Pathologies were almost completed when the Faculty suddenly requested to interrupt them, considering the premises inadequate for the needs of the Clinics, for which it proposed the construction of a Polyclinic.

=== 20th century ===
At the turn of the 19th and 20th centuries, the prestige of the University of Naples increased, particularly in the scientific field: in the field of genetics it was a pioneer, with the establishment of the first chair in Italy. After intense debate about the location of the Polyclinic, it was finally decided to place it in the historic center of the city. At the beginning of the 20th century, the Faculty inaugurated its Polyclinic, which housed all the Medical and Surgical Clinics. The premises of Santa Patrizia were then completed to accommodate the Institutes of Human Anatomy, Pathological Anatomy, Forensic Medicine, Hygiene, and the Anatomical Museum.

New difficulties of both building and organizational nature afflicted the university both during the Fascist era and during the World War II: in 1938, the presence of Nazi authorities led to the removal of Jewish professors and forced adherence to regime symbols, such as the swastika. The central headquarters was set on fire by the Germans on 12 September 1943, and on the same day, a young sailor was executed on the main staircase of the University Palace; laboratories and scientific labs were requisitioned by the Allies.

After the war, following the modern evolution of the university model in general, the University of Naples became the second most important university in Italy in terms of number of students, second only to the Sapienza University of Rome.

During the academic year 1972–1973, the University of Naples counted over 40,000 enrolled students and employed a workforce of 3,000 employees.

On 7 September 1987, it assumed its current name as University of Naples Federico II in anticipation of the establishment, in 1991, through its spin-off, of the Università degli Studi della Campania Luigi Vanvitelli.

The specialization school in oncology, affiliated with the first faculty of medicine and surgery, was established in October 1989, followed by the establishment of the school in ophthalmology in December 1992.

On 16 October 1998, by decree of the Ministry of Public Education, University, Scientific and Technological Research (MURST) at the time, as part of a process of gradual organic separation within the university, the faculties of law, engineering, and science were divided into separate degree courses, including mathematics, physics, and natural sciences.

=== 21st century ===
On 17 September 2016, the new university complex in the Neapolitan neighborhood of San Giovanni a Teduccio was inaugurated. In 2017, the Nasa Space Apps Challenge took place at the aforementioned university complex, a 48-hour international hackathon dedicated to space technology and its terrestrial applications.

In 2020, Rita Mastrullo became the first woman to hold the position of vice-rector.

On 5 June 2021, the Federico II University Foundation was established, a non-profit organization aimed at fostering cultural, economic, and social development in the region and supporting the University in managing its institutional activities.

In 2022, twelve out of the twenty-six departments of the university were recognized and included in the list of "Departments of Excellence" by the National Agency for the Evaluation of the University and Research System (ANVUR). In October of the same year, two university complexes were inaugurated: one in the Scampia district, located in the north of Naples, and another in the municipality of Portici, specifically in the area known as Villa Ferretti.

In 2023, the university commemorated its eighth century of history with a series of events and initiatives, highlighted by the inauguration of the 2023–2024 academic year, graced by the presence of the President of Italy, Sergio Mattarella. Additionally, during the same year, the Polo Nazionale di Trasferimento Tecnologico (National Technology Transfer Hub) was inaugurated.

On 26 January 2024, the first Academy for Women Entrepreneurs (AWE) in Italy was established, with the presence of Tracy Roberts-Pounds, the Consul General of the United States of America in Naples. In the same year, a team of engineers, cellular biologists, and physicists from the university, through the N2FXm project, in collaboration with the Molecular Oncology Foundation Institute in Milan and the ETH Zurich, unveiled the osmo-mechanical regulation of nuclear volume in mammalian cells. The article was published in the scientific journal Nature.

On May 2024, the university inaugurated Partenope, Italy's first public superconducting quantum computer, initially operating on a 25-qubit architecture. In early 2026, the system underwent a major hardware upgrade with the integration of a 64-qubit processor, scaling its capacity to become the country's most powerful quantum system. Alongside the development of the computer, Italy’s first Quantum Internet Testbed was also launched at the same laboratories; this is an urban fibre-optic network infrastructure designed for experimenting with quantum networks.

== Buildings and sites ==
The university is a "city university" in that it does not have a main campus; instead, colleges, departments, accommodation, and other facilities are scattered throughout the city of Naples and Portici. The university possesses a vast architectural heritage.

=== Naples ===
==== Central site ====
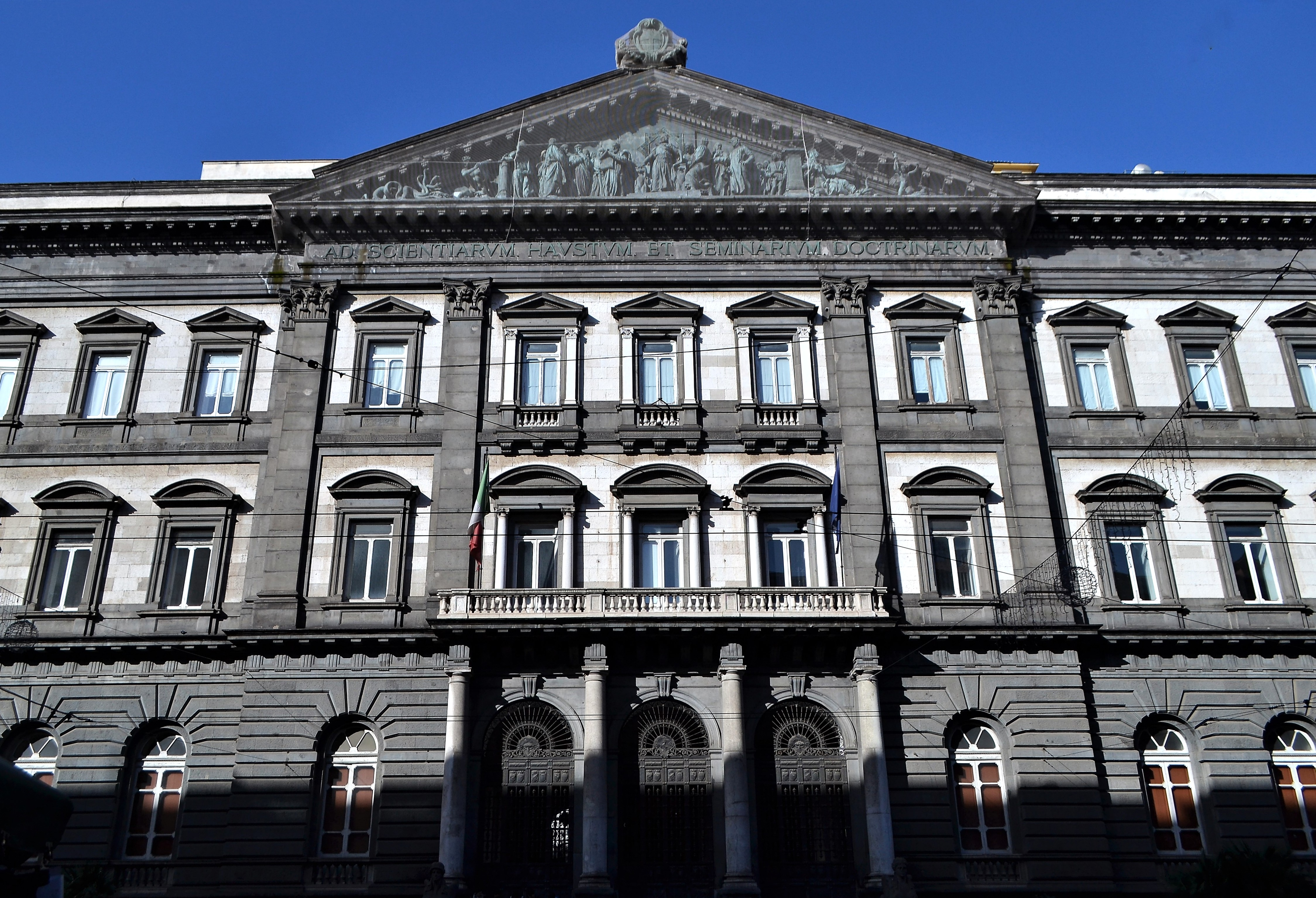
The Palace which homes the University's Central Headquarters.

Federico II's 13.82-acre (5.59 ha) main campus is centered in the Historic Centre of Naples. The Central Campus contains administrative offices and libraries. The Central Campus is located along Corso Umberto I, at the corner with Via Mezzocannone. It is made up of several historical palaces.

The University Palace, built in neo-Baroque style, was constructed during the Risanamento period, between 1897 and 1908, according to a design by architects Pierpaolo Quaglia and Guglielmo Melisurgo. Situated adjacent to the original university complex, which had been housed in the Casa del Salvatore since 1777, after the Jesuits ceased ownership, the new structure was integrated with the existing facilities behind it. The architects ensured connectivity by establishing the Scalone della Minerva, which spans from the courtyard of the Palace to the Casa del Salvatore Palace courtyard, bridging a height difference of over 7 metres (23 ft). The Palace accommodates the central administrative offices of the university, including the Rectorate, Academic Senate, and Treasury, along with the Department of Law. Additionally, it serves as a secondary location for the Department of Humanities.

Adjacent to the University Palace are numerous other buildings that together form an adjoining university campus.

The House of the Saviour Palace is an architectural complex in Baroque style dating back to the 16th century. It houses the laboratories of the Department of Earth Sciences and the Department of Experimental Biology of Federico II, as well as the main scientific museums curated by the university: the Museum of Physics, the Museum of Anthropology, the Museum of Paleontology, the Museum of Mineralogy, and the Museum of Zoology. The monumental building (known as the "courtyard of the Statues") is home to the National Society of Sciences, Letters, and Arts in Naples, the Accademia Pontaniana, the University Library of Naples, the Department of Roman Law and History of Romanistic Science, as well as several lecture halls of Federico II. The Centro linguistico di Ateneo (CLA) is also headquartered here, on the fifth floor of the Department of Law. Adjacent to it is the palace known as the "Palazzo dell'ex poligono di tiro" (Palace of the former shooting range).

The San Marcellino complex was originally a monastic complex dating back to the Early Middle Ages, probably built between the 8th and 9th centuries. The complex has a rectangular plan with three pilastered arches whose structures are covered with decorations in piperno; at the center is an 18th–19th century garden adorned with various piperno and marble fountains. Facing the complex are several rooms, including the chapter house on the southwestern side, paved with maiolica tiles by Giuseppe Massa around 1740 and now housing the Paleontology Museum. However, the entire western side of the complex features architecture without arches, beginning from the Chapter hall and concluding in the north with a panoramic terrace overlooking the sea. Along the walls of the arches, numerous archaeological finds discovered during frequent construction works are displayed. It is the seat of the Department of Political Science, the Paleontology Museum, and the Scuola Superiore Meridionale.

The San Pietro Martire Complex, locally and commonly known as "Porta di Massa" and abbreviated as "PdM" due to its location on Via Porta di Massa, is an architectural complex situated opposite the University Palace, on the other side of Corso Umberto I. Dating back to the 16th century, the structure of the building is quadrangular, with each side featuring seven arches and a 16th-century marble fountain at its center. The Department of Humanities is located here, offering degree programs in Languages and Linguistics, Literature, and Philosophy.

The Iniziativa Marina and Pecoraro-Albani buildings are two modern structures dating back to the 20th century. Both serve as headquarters for the Department of Law; additionally, the Iniziativa Marina building houses the undergraduate program in Historical Sciences of the Department of Humanities and the Interdepartmental Center for Studies on Magna Graecia. The Pecoraro-Albani Building was named after Antonio Pecoraro-Albani, former dean of the Faculty of Law from 1986 to 1993.

The De Laurentiis Palace, serves as headquarter for the Department of Social Sciences. It showcases 18th-century moldings and cornices in piperno on its facades, along with three staircases, all characterized by the use of Vesuvian stone. Among these, the staircase opening to the left in the courtyard is particularly noteworthy, while the two staircases to the right are of a common type found in Neapolitan palaces. These elemen not easily dated, could also be attributed to the adaptation and restoration works that the building underwent after the 1786 fire mentioned by Giuseppe Sigismondo.

Finally, the ISVEIMER Palace, a modern building located in front of the Pecoraro-Albani Building, houses the Secretary's Office of the Department of Humanities.

Additionally, the deconsecrated Church of Saints Demetrius and Boniface is owned by the university and is used as the great hall of the Department of Architecture.

==== Quartieri Spagnoli ====
The Quartieri Spagnoli site borough comprises three historic buildings housing the Department of Architecture.

The Orsini di Gravina Palace is an elegant example of Renaissance architecture in Naples, influenced by Tuscan and Roman styles. The palace features a quadrangular layout rising over the main floor and ground floor. Only the facade side of the sixteenth-century structure remains, characterized by the rhythm of cushion bosses on the ground floor and Composite pilasters in piperno, interspersed with the openings of marble-framed windows. The Palace houses the central headquarters of the Department.

The Complex of the Holy Spirit, built in the mid-sixteenth century, underwent several renovations. The monumental portal and the part facing the courtyard are in Baroque style, while the rest was reconstructed in 1960 by Marcello Canino. It hosts a secondary office of the Department.

Finally, the Latilla Palace, dating back to the eighteenth century, preserves on the second floor a small chapel with a tiled floor used for conferences and academic symposia. It also houses a secondary office of the Department.

The Main Botanical Garden, part of the Faculty of Mathematical, Physical and Natural Sciences, extends over 12 hectares and is home to around 9000 plant species and almost 25000 specimens. It was built in 1807 by Joseph Bonaparte.

==== Zona ospedaliera ====
- Policlinico – Cappella Cangiani Complex (Federico II University Hospital): The Cangiani Chapel Complex, so called because it is located in the Cangiani district in Rione Alto (5th Municipality), covers an area of 441,000 m^{2} on which 21 buildings stand for a covered area of 57,086 m^{2} (and a total floor area of 257,118 m^{2}). The main entrance to the university hospital complex is located in via Pansini; three other secondary entrances can be used on certain days and times. Mobility within the vast complex is ensured by a free mini-bus service which connects the main entrance with the various pavilions. The Department of Clinical Medicine and Surgery, the Department of Pharmacy, the Department of Molecular Medicine and Medical Biotechnology, the Department of Neurosciences and Reproductive and Odontostomatological Sciences, the Department of Public Health, the Department of Advanced Biomedical Sciences and the Department of Translational Medical Sciences.

==== Fuorigrotta ====
- Building of the Faculty of Engineering, located in Piazzale Tecchio.
- Monte Sant'Angelo Complex: seat of the scientific and economic area departments, it is located in Via Cupa Nuova Cintia, 21.
- Building of the Faculty of Economics and Commerce

==== San Giovanni a Teduccio ====
- San Giovanni Complex: headquarters of the Polytechnic School and Basic Sciences, is located in Corso Nicolangelo Protopisani, 70.

==== San Carlo all'Arena ====
Botanical Garden of Naples, located in Via Foria, 223.

==== Scampia ====
- Scampia Complex: site dedicated mainly to the departments of medicine and surgery with the Human Nutrition Sciences degree course. It is located in Viale della Resistenza, Naples. The building has 5 floors, with a total surface area of 15 000 square meters, with 48 classrooms with 330 seats, laboratories, medical offices, offices and teaching services, clinics, clinics and a lecture hall.

=== Portici ===
- Royal Palace of Portici: headquarters of the Faculty of Agriculture, of the MUSA Center – Museums of Agricultural Sciences and of the Agricultural Area Library, located in Via Università, Portici.
- Palazzo Mascabruno: secondary headquarters of the Faculty of Agriculture, located in Via Università.

==== Parks ====
The Botanical Garden of Portici was founded in 1872, at the time of the foundation of the MUSA Center of the then Royal School of Agriculture, to which the Royal Palace of Portici was assigned as its headquarters together with its park and gardens. In 1935, with the assignment of three squares of the Gussone Park, the extension reached 20,000 square metres (2.0 ha), creating three areas in which the palm grove, a fern grove with a small lake and a space of around 1,000 square metres (0.10 ha) were set up for dedicated heated greenhouses. to plant collections. It hosts about 1000 species. Of particular interest is the collection of desert plants, including the Welwitschia mirabilis from Namibia. The botanical exhibition is organized by geographical distribution and environmental types: it houses conifers, Mediterranean flora, magnolias, and plants from Central and South America, Australia, and South Africa; others are of Eurasian origin.

The Pedicino Greenhouse, restored in 2000, houses a collection of epiphytic plants. A stone structure houses the Primula palinuri, endemic in Campania, Basilicata, and Calabria. Adjacent to the historic garden and in the shade of the oaks, the fern garden is one of the most suggestive corners of the Garden. A little further away, a palm grove houses twenty-five different species and specimens of Plumeria and Grevillea robusta.

== Organisation and governance ==
The university consists of schools to which multiple departments align based on criteria of cultural, didactic, scientific, and disciplinary affinity. These schools oversee coordinated educational endeavors among their constituent departments. The university comprises four schools and twenty-six departments, organized as follows:

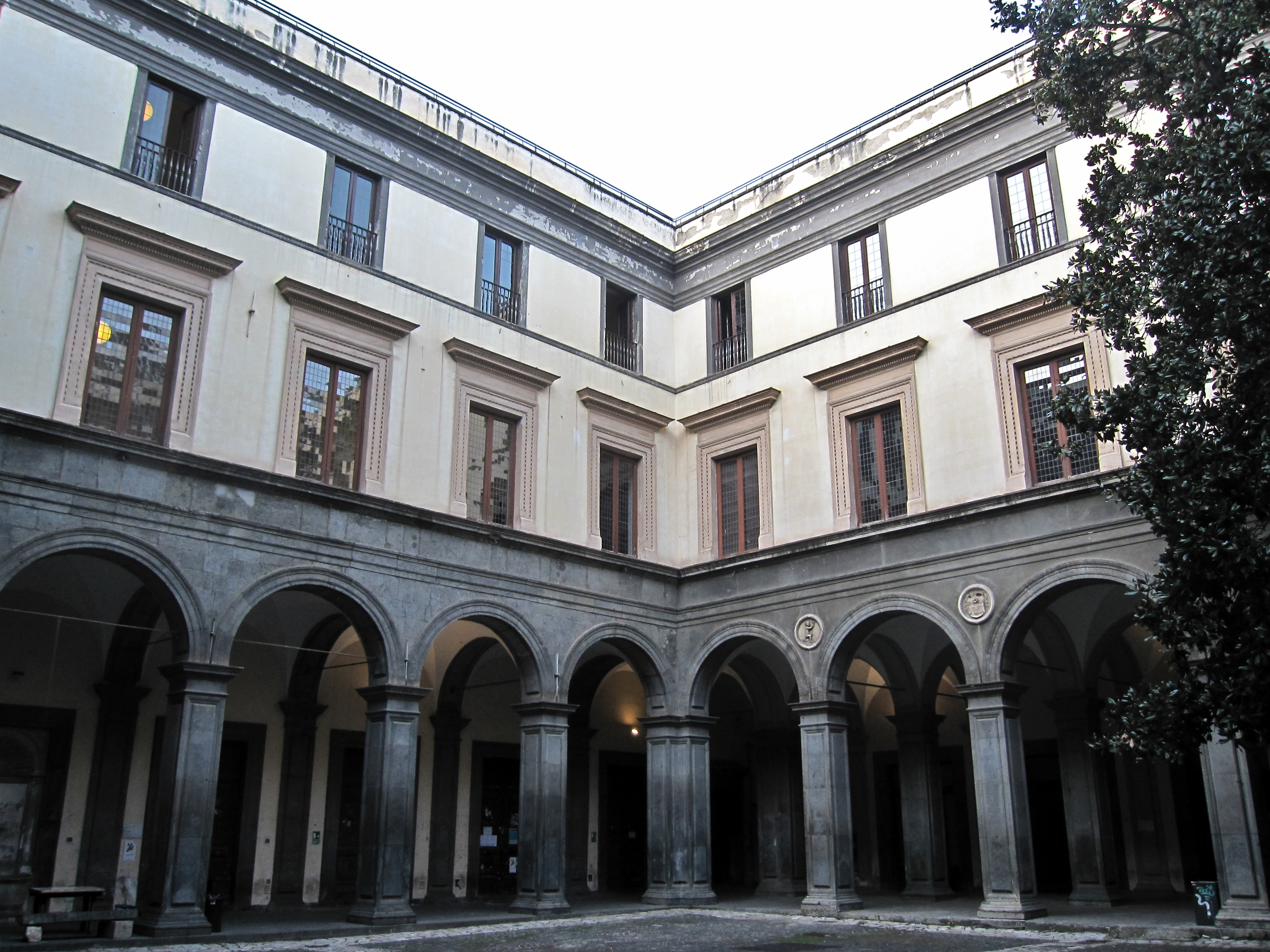
Faculty of Architecture.

- School of Medicine and Surgery
  - Department of Pharmacy
  - Department of Clinical Medicine and Surgery
  - Department of Molecular Medicine and Medical Biotechnology
  - Department of Neurosciences and Reproductive and Dental Sciences
  - Department of Public Health
  - Department of Advanced Biomedical Sciences
  - Department of Translational Medical Sciences
- School of Agriculture and Veterinary Medicine
  - Department of Agriculture
  - Department of veterinary medicine and animal production
- School of Humanities and Social Sciences
  - Department of economics, management, institutions
  - Department of Law
  - Department of Economic Sciences and Statistics
  - Department of Social Sciences
  - Department of Political Science
  - Department of Humanities
- Polytechnic and Basic Sciences School
  - Department of Architecture
  - Department of Biology
  - Department of Physics
  - Department of Chemical, Materials and Industrial Production Engineering
  - Department of Civil, Construction and Environmental Engineering
  - Department of Electrical Engineering and Information Technologies
  - Department of Industrial Engineering
  - Department of Mathematics and Applications
  - Department of Chemical Sciences
  - Department of Earth, Environmental and Resource Sciences
  - Department of Facilities Engineering and Architecture

In total, as of the 2022/2023 academic year, the departments offer 78 three-year degree programs, 81 master's programs, 10 single-cycle master's programs, 50 research doctorates, 13 first-level master's programs, 35-second-level master's programs, and 68 specialization schools.

=== Academies ===
The centuries-old Accademia Pontaniana and the Società Nazionale di Scienze, Lettere e Arti di Napoli are based at the university.

The university also boasts 16 academies established through collaborations with multinational companies:

- Aerotech Academy, in collaboration with Leonardo;
- Cybersecurity Hackademy, in collaboration with Accenture;
- DIGITA, in collaboration with Deloitte;
- SI Academy – Smart Infrastructures, in collaboration with Tecne SpA;
- Make Napoli, in collaboration with Medtronic;
- CoreAcademy, in collaboration with KPMG, DXC Technology and Exprivia;
- 5G Academy, in collaboration with Nokia, Capgemini and TIM;
- Quantum Computing Academy, in collaboration with QuantumNet;
- Agritech Academy, in collaboration with Agritech;
- Ideneers Academy, in collaboration with Italdesign Giugiaro;
- ESRI Academy, in collaboration with Esri Italia;
- Namirial SkillUp Academy, in collaboration with Namirial;
- 3D Experience Academy, in collaboration with Dassault Systèmes;
- Apple Developer Academy;
- Cisco Academy;
- Micron Academy.

==== Apple Developer Academy ====
The Apple Developer Academy is a university academy established on October 6, 2016, in collaboration with the American company Apple Inc. It is situated in the San Giovanni Complex, located in the San Giovanni a Teduccio district.

The training primarily focuses on software development and app design tailored for the Apple ecosystem. The training areas are categorized into:

- Programming (Swift, server-side scripting, SQL, NoSQL)
- Graphical interface design (HCI)
- Business

The lessons are centered around Challenge-based learning (CBL), a multidisciplinary approach that motivates students to leverage everyday technologies to solve real-world problems. As of December 2023, the Academy has welcomed over 1700 students, resulting in the creation and deployment of more than 800 applications.

==== Cisco Academy – Digital Transformation Lab ====
The Digital Transformation Lab (DTLab) is a laboratory resulting from a collaborative effort between the American company Cisco Systems and the CeSMA (Advanced Metrological and Technological Services Center) of the Federico II University. It was inaugurated on January 28, 2018, and is housed within the University Complex of San Giovanni. The course is offered free of charge and provides participants with the opportunity to earn the Cisco DevNet Associate certification.

==== Micron International Academy ====
Micron International Academy (MIA) was officially established on 7 March 2023 following a collaboration agreement between the university and Micron Semiconductor Italia, a subsidiary of the US multinational Micron Technology. Organisational, logistical and scientific management is entrusted to the University’s CeSMA (Centre for Advanced Metrological and Technological Services). The programme aims to train qualified professionals capable of working in the development and testing of embedded memory systems. Lectures began in 2024 at the San Giovanni a Teduccio University Campus.

=== Scuola Superiore Meridionale ===
The Scuola Superiore Meridionale (SSM) serves as the university's superior graduate school and research institution. It provides supplementary courses and research doctorates to complement the standard university curriculum conducted at the institution. The SSM is tasked with advancing the university system and fostering collaborations with other Italian and international schools and universities. Moreover, it is dedicated to scientific research across various disciplines.

The school was initially established on an experimental basis on November 13, 2019, through the 2019 budget law. On April 2, 2022, a decree from the Ministry of University and Research, issued on January 27 of the same year, officially transformed the school into a permanent university high school.

The SSM is made up of the following 10 doctoral areas:

- Archeology
- Oncology
- Cosmology
- Genomic and experimental medicine
- History
- Legal studies for people with disabilities
- Mathematical and physical sciences for advanced technologies
- Risk and complexity of modeling and engineering
- Molecular sciences
- Literal studies

The School offers students complimentary room and board in its residences, along with a monthly stipend and exemption from university fees. Admission is granted through an annual public competition announcement.

=== Service centers ===
==== Centro Linguistico di Ateneo ====
The Centro Linguistico di Ateneo (CLA) is the institution tasked with coordinating various educational, scientific, and service-related activities concerning languages, including translation and interpreting services. The CLA provides instructional programs for internationally recognized language certifications in the primary European languages (English, Spanish, French, German) as well as Italian as a second language.

The services offered by the CLA are available to students enrolled at the Federico II University, including doctoral students, interns, tenured professors, researchers, as well as technical-administrative and auxiliary staff.

The Centro Linguistico plays a central role in two European projects funded under the Erasmus+ Strategic Partnership KA2 program: EULALIA and GAMELAND (2022–2025). Acting as the scientific manager and coordinator, the CLA leads these initiatives aimed at developing educational applications utilizing innovative Mobile Learning methodologies.

The CLA provides training activities in person, remotely, and through blended learning modalities.

==== Centro di Ateneo SlnAPSi ====
The Centro di Ateneo Servizi per l'Inclusione Attiva e Partecipata degli Studenti (SInAPSi) is an institution that provides psychological support to students facing difficulties through counseling activities. It provides services aimed at fostering educational success, addressing disabilities and specific learning difficulties, combating discrimination, and promoting employability.

The SInAPSi Center implements targeted actions using expertise in psychology, sociology, pedagogy, and bioengineering. It is distributed across the Neapolitan territory through four different locations: the University Complex of Monte Sant'Angelo, the University Complex of San Pietro Martire, the Botanical Garden of Naples, and a location in the Agnano Terme district.

=== University Hospital ===
The institution known as the Azienda Ospedaliera Universitaria Federico II (Federico II University Hospital), colloquially referred to as the Naples Polyclinic, is an integral component of the university. Established in 1972, it operates as a polyclinic—a hospital complex that serves both public healthcare needs and functions as a site for university teaching. Indeed, the teaching facilities of the School of Medicine and Surgery of the Federician University are housed within this establishment. The complex comprises numerous pavilions and a skyscraper, situated in the hospital precinct, spanning the areas between the Arenella and Chiaiano districts.

A further polyclinic was historically managed by the university, known as the old polyclinic, now operates as the Azienda Ospedaliera "Luigi Vanvitelli". It was established in 1907 and served as the initial home for the first university faculty of Medicine and Surgery of the University of Naples Federico II. In 1992, it was transferred to the newly established Second University of Naples (now the University of Campania Luigi Vanvitelli) and subsequently became the headquarters of the Faculty of Medicine and Surgery of that institution.

== Academic profile ==
=== Research ===
The university hosts 24 interdepartmental research centers and 17 interuniversity research centers, employing over 4000 active researchers, including more than 400 research fellows and 1400 doctoral students. It collaborates extensively with other public and private research institutions, both within Italy and internationally. One notable collaboration is with BioGeM, a scientific research center focused on molecular genetics and biotechnology.

=== Libraries ===
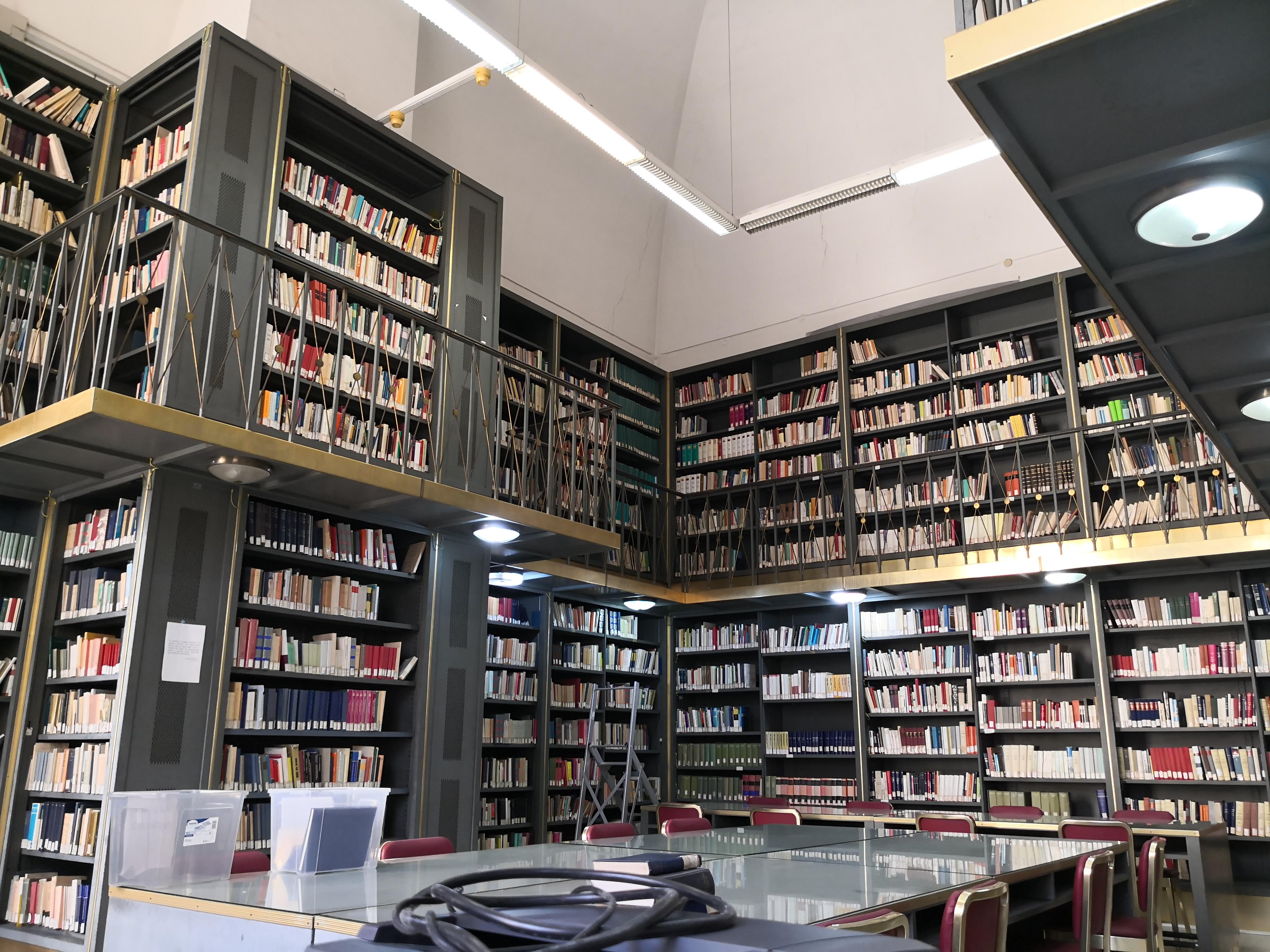
View of the Library of Roman law and history of Roman science of the Department of Law

The library system of the University of Naples Federico II encompasses Area, Center, and Department libraries. These libraries are strategically distributed throughout the city and its surrounding areas.

- Agricultural Area Library, located in the municipality of Portici
- Architecture Area Library
- Economics Area Library
- Pharmacy Area Library
- Legal Area Library
- Engineering Area Library
- Medicine and Surgery Area Library
- "Giuseppe Cuomo" Political Science Area Library
- Social Sciences Area Library
- Science Area Library
- Humanities Library (BRAU)
- Veterinary Area Library
- Digital Library on the Camorra and Culture of Legality
- University Center for Libraries "Roberto Pettorino"

The heritage owned by the libraries amounts to over two million volumes and nearly 3,500 subscriptions to periodicals; to manage such a workload, the University Library Center (CAB-Centro di Ateneo per le Biblioteche) was established in 2009 (named after Roberto Pettorino in 2013), which coordinates the university library system. The CAB provides services such as acquisition and access to electronic resources, management and development of online catalogs for university bibliographic resources, management and development of the institutional repository, support for university libraries, and support for the scientific community in accessing bibliographic resources.

=== Museums ===
- The Museum Center of Natural and Physical Sciences was established in 1992, consolidating the pre-existing museums of Mineralogy, Zoology, Anthropology, and Paleontology. In 2002, the museum of Physics was added to the Center. Occupying approximately 4,000 square metres (0.99 acres) inside the historic Collegio del Salvatore, located in via Mezzocannone, the Center houses over 150,000 artifacts from various parts of the world. The museums within the Center actively engage with the community, organizing exhibitions, conferences, seminars, and educational activities for schools, including guided tours, workshops, and excursions.
- The Museum Center "Museums of Agricultural Sciences," situated at the Royal Palace of Portici, was established in 2011. It comprises various institutions, including the Portici Botanical Garden, the Orazio Comes Botanical Museum, the Filippo Silvestri Entomological Museum, the Antonio Parascandola Mineralogical Museum, the Carlo Santini Agricultural Mechanics Museum, the Tito Manlio Bettini Anatomical-Zootechnical Museum, and the Historical Museum Library. The Center's collection includes artifacts, instruments, and scientific books, some dating back to the 1500s, which provide insights into the history of agricultural sciences and technologies in southern Italy and beyond. They also represent the evolution of scientific thought and explorations in foreign lands.
- The Museum of Veterinary Anatomy, located within a wing of the Santa Maria degli Angeli alle Croci complex, was established in 2000, originally housed within the Faculty of Veterinary Medicine. However, the first museum traces back to 1861 when it included a collection of wax anatomical preparations, skeletons, and various bones to support the teaching of veterinary anatomy. Today, the museum's collection primarily consists of viscera, skeletons, taxidermy animals, and pathological specimens—both dry and preserved in formalin—of animals native to the Mediterranean region.

== Student life ==
=== Athletics ===
The university's sports activities are managed by CUS Napoli, the multi-sports center of the Neapolitan universities, established in 1945 following the dissolution of GUF Napoli.

Unina Corse is the university racing team that competes in the Formula SAE World Championship. It is divided into two teams: one focuses on building a car powered by an internal combustion engine, while the other focuses on building an electric car.

== Notable people ==
=== Alumni ===
Among those who have attended the University of Naples Federico II are Italian presidents Enrico De Nicola, Giovanni Leone and Giorgio Napolitano; mayors of Naples Luigi de Magistris and Gaetano Manfredi; CEO Fabrizio Freda; and philosophers Benedetto Croce and Nicola Abbagnano.

- Samantha Cristoforetti, astronaut and commandor of the International Space Station
- Saint Thomas Aquinas, philosopher and theologian
- Ferdinando Mancini, theoretical physicist
- Leonardo Bianchi, physician and politician
- Amadeo Bordiga, politician and political theorist
- Giordano Bruno, philosopher, Dominican friar, mathematician and astronomer
- Renato Caccioppoli, mathematician
- Antonio Cardarelli, physician and politician
- Ernesto De Martino, historian of religion and folklore scholar
- Francesco De Martino, eminent jurist, intellectual and politician
- Fabrizio de Miranda, structural engineer
- Paolo Esposito, chartered accountant and academic
- Gaetano Filangieri, jurist and philosopher
- Marta Filizola, computational biophysicist
- Nicola Fusco, mathematician
- Pietro Giannone, historian, philosopher and jurist
- Nunziante Ippolito, physician and anatomist
- Antonio Labriola, philosopher
- Saint Alphonsus Liguori, Doctor of the Catholic Church
- Vangjel Meksi, Albanian physician, translator and philologist
- Attilio Micheluzzi, comics author-artist, graduate in architecture
- Giuseppe Mingione, mathematician
- Giuseppe Moscati, Roman Catholic saint, physician, educator, and scientist
- Francesco Saverio Nitti, economist and politician
- Umberto Nobile, aeronautical engineer and Arctic explorer
- Luigi Palmieri, physicist
- Luca Parmitano, astronaut
- Raffaele Piria, chemist
- Carlo de Ferrariis Salzano, lawyer and diplomat
- Roberto Saviano, journalist and novelist
- Pasquale Lucio Scandizzo, economist, academic and author
- Athanas Shundi, Albanian pharmacist and politician
- Vincenzo Tiberio, physician
- Anna Tramontano, computational biologist
- Cinzia Verde, marine biochemistry researcher
- Giambattista Vico, philosopher, historian, and jurist
- Giuseppe Zaccagnino, diplomat and art collector
- Nicola Romeo, founder of Alfa Romeo
- Franzo Grande Stevens, chairman of Juventus FC
Italian presidents who attended Federico II

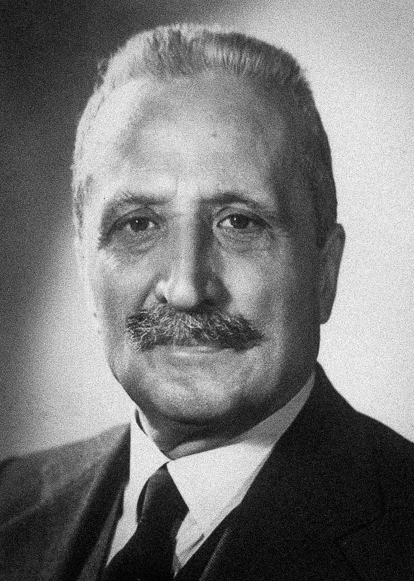
Enrico de Nicola

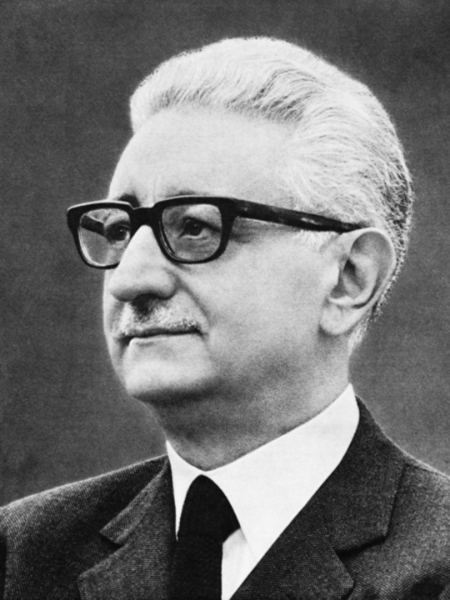
Giovanni Leone

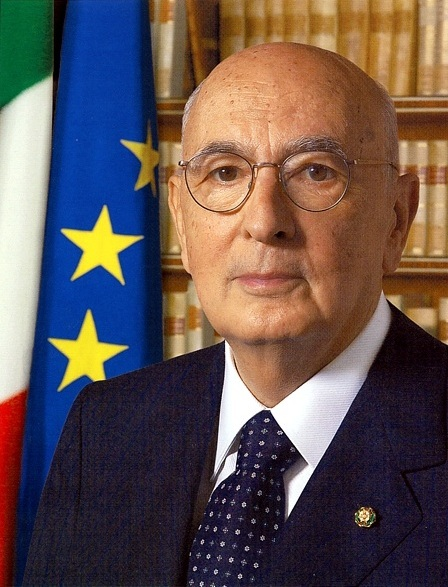
Giorgio Napolitano

=== Presidents of the Italian Republic ===
- Enrico De Nicola
- Giovanni Leone
- Giorgio Napolitano

=== Notable professors ===
- St. Thomas Aquinas, influential philosopher, saint, influential theologian
- Leonardo Bianchi, physician and politician
- Renato Caccioppoli, mathematician
- Antonio Cardarelli, physician and politician
- Domenico Cotugno, physician
- Nicola Fusco, mathematician
- Antonio Genovesi, philosopher and economist
- Giovanni Filippo Ingrassia, physician
- Stefania Filo Speziale, first woman to graduate in architecture in Naples
- Ettore Majorana, physicist
- Macedonio Melloni, physicist
- Giuseppe Mercalli, volcanologist
- Vincenzo Monaldi, physician and physiologist. First Italian Minister of Health
- Francesco Saverio Nitti, economist and politician
- Luigi Palmieri, physicist and meteorologist
- Alessandro Piccolo, Italian chemist and agricultural scientist
- Nino Salvatore, physician
- Giosuè Sangiovanni, zoologist, founder of the Faculty of Natural Sciences
- Filippo Silvestri, entomologist
- Giambattista Vico, philosopher, historian, and jurist

=== Honoris Causa graduates ===
- John Nash, awarded 1994 Nobel Memorial Prize in Economics
- Franco Modigliani, awarded 1985 Nobel Memorial Prize in Economics
- Richard Meier, winner of the Pritzker Architecture Prize
- Umberto Veronesi, Italian oncologist, physician, scientist and politician
- Louis Ignarro, awarded 1998 Nobel Prize in Physiology or Medicine
- Riccardo Muti, Italian conductor
- Takaaki Kajita, awarded 2015 Nobel Prize in Physics
- Paolo Sorrentino, Italian film director, screenwriter, and writer
- Tim Cook, CEO of Apple

== See also ==
- ESDP-Network
- List of Italian universities
- List of medieval universities
- Naples
- Botanical Garden of Naples
- Orto Botanico di Portici
- BioGeM
