= House of the Savior, Naples =

House of the Savior
- Italian: Casa del Salvatore
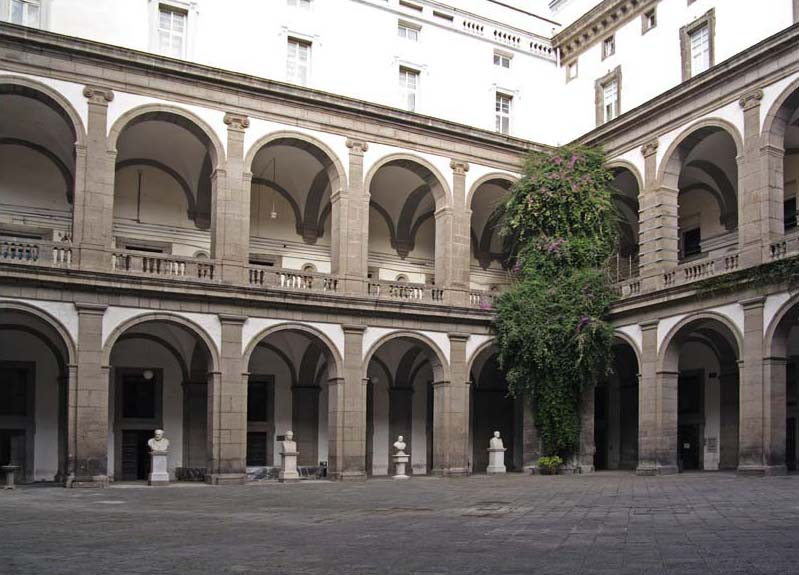
- The Cortile delle statue (Courtyard of the Statues).

Location
- Vico San Marcellino, 12; Naples, Campania; Italy
- Coordinates: 40°50′49″N 14°15′26″E

Information
- Other name: Jesuit Maximum College (former)
- Type: University
- Established: 1554; 472 years ago
- Founder: Jesuits (Catholicism)
- Status: In use

House of the Saviour (Italian: Casa del Salvatore) is an architectural complex located in the historic center of Naples. It houses the Department of Experimental Biology and the laboratories of the Department of Earth Sciences of the University of Naples Federico II, as well as the Museum Center of Natural and Physical Sciences.

The complex is located between Via Paladino on the eastern side and Via Mezzocannone on the western side and consists of two buildings arranged around two courtyards: the Cloister of the Savior and the Monumental Cloister (also known as the Courtyard of the Statues), separated by the Church of Gesù Vecchio, which serves as the focal point of the entire layout.

The Monumental Building (Courtyard of the Statues) houses the National Society of Sciences, Letters, and Arts in Naples, the Accademia Pontaniana, the University Language Center (CLA), the University Library of Naples, the Department of Roman Law and the History of Romanistic Science, as well as several classrooms of the University of Naples Federico II.

The House of the Savior, on the other hand, houses the laboratories of the Department of Earth Sciences and the Department of Experimental Biology of Federico II, as well as the main scientific museums in Naples. Four of these museums are part of the Museum Center of Natural and Physical Sciences, also curated by Federico II University: the Museum of Physics, the Museum of Anthropology, the Museum of Paleontology, the Museum of Mineralogy, and the Museum of Zoology.

== History ==
The complex, known mainly as a former Jesuit Maximum College, was the seat of the College of the Society of Jesus from 1554 when the fathers bought the fifteenth-century palace of Gian Tommaso Carafa. In 1557 work began on the construction of schools and a new church, under the guidance of Polidoro Cafaro and later under Jesuit architect Giovanni Tristano, who was replaced by one of his pupils, the Jesuit Giovanni De Rosis.

Following the acquisition in 1571 of the palace of Andrea of Evoli, the 16th century De Rosis cloister was built, between 1572 and 1578, and is now incorporated into the seventeenth-century structures. The current Monumental Cloister was begun in 1605 and completed in 1653, designed by the Jesuit architect Giuseppe Valeriano since the De Rosis had been recalled to Rome for the construction of the Roman College. The Jesuit Pietro Provedi and Agazio Stoia helped complete the work, which had been consecrated in 1632.

The Society of Jesus values the work, as attested by two plaques in honour of the benefactors Roberta Carafa of Stigliano (dated 1583 and placed on the portal) and Cesare del Ponte (built in 1653 and designed by Cosimo Fanzago). The latter plaque is located in the courtyard and is distinguished by a marble coat of arms on which is engraved in Latin: "Children of Cesare De Ponte, with the father's wealth, built the entire school in 1605. The Society of Jesus places this monument with gratitude in 1653."

When in 1767 the Jesuits were expelled from the Kingdom of Naples, the Bourbon Ferdinand IV made it a public school with the name "House of the Savior," and in 1770 a boarding school was opened. The boarding school became a hospital for Russian troops in 1799 and in 1812 it was elevated to the rank of high school. In 1860 by government decree the high school was abolished and its premises were annexed to the university. After a brief period that saw the return of the Jesuits before their renewed expulsion from the Kingdom of Naples, the University settled permanently in the complex under Joseph Bonaparte. It was in those years of French domination that imposing monuments were added to the courtyard under the guidance of Stefano Gasse, official architect of the Royal University.

== See also ==
- List of Jesuit sites
