= Ferdinando Mancini =

- Born: June 4, 1941 (age 85); Naples, Italy
- Education: University of Naples Federico II (Laurea in Physics, 1966); University of Wisconsin–Milwaukee (Ph.D. in Physics, 1971)
- Known for: Boson method Composite Operator Method
- Scientific career
- Fields: Theoretical physics, Condensed matter physics
- Workplaces: University of Salerno; International Institute for Advanced Scientific Studies "Eduardo R. Caianiello" (IIASS)
- Doctoral advisor: Hiroomi Umezawa

Ferdinando Mancini (born June 4, 1941) is an Italian theoretical physicist, Emeritus Professor in the Department of Physics at the University of Salerno and president of the International Institute for Advanced Scientific Studies (IIASS) in Vietri sul Mare. Mancini has contributed to condensed matter physics, particularly the theory of strongly correlated systems and superconductivity.

== Education and career ==
Mancini received his degree in Physics from the University of Naples Federico II in 1966. He then pursued doctoral studies in the United States, obtaining his Ph.D. in Physics from the University of Wisconsin–Milwaukee in 1971.

He joined the University of Salerno in 1972, where he was instrumental in the creation and development of its Faculty of Science. Mancini served as a Professor of Structure of Matter from 1980 until his retirement in 2011. In 2012, he was appointed Professor Emeritus by the University of Salerno.

In addition to his roles at the university, Mancini helped founding the International Institute for Advanced Scientific Studies (IIASS) in Vietri sul Mare in 1981, alongside Eduardo Caianiello and Maria Marinaro. The IIASS is an institute dedicated to advanced theoretical research. Mancini has been president of the IIASS since 2012.

During his tenure at the University of Salerno, Mancini also held administrative positions. He was the Director of the Department of Physics (later Department of Physics "E.R. Caianiello") for 12 years. For 10 years, he served as a member of the University's Board of Directors and as chairman of its Finance Committee.

Mancini's scientific work and contribution to the field of condensed matter physics has been celebrated by his colleagues with a conference to mark his 60th birthday

== Research ==
Mancini's research interests include quantum field theory, statistical mechanics, and the physics of strongly correlated systems, with a focus on phenomena such as superconductivity and ferromagnetism.

With Hiroomi Umezawa, Mancini created and developed the boson method in superconductivity. This theoretical framework yielded results that demonstrated excellent agreement with experimental data. Later, his research focus shifted towards thermo field dynamics, a quantum field theory at finite temperatures. He is credited with formulating the Composite Operator Method (COM), a technique for analyzing strongly correlated systems like the Hubbard model and the Ising model.

Mancini has co-edited about 30 academic volumes. Notable among these is the three-volume set 'Strongly Correlated Systems', covering theoretical methods, numerical methods, and experimental techniques for studying these complex systems.

== Selected publications ==
- Leplae, L., Umezawa, H., Mancini, F. (1974) Derivation and Application of the Boson Method in Superconductivity; Physics Reports C 10, 151. https://doi.org/10.1016/0370-1573(74)90048-9
- Matsumoto, H., Nakano, Y., Umezawa, H., Mancini, F. and Marinaro, M. (1983) 'Thermo Field Dynamics in Interaction Representation', Progress of Theoretical Physics, 70, p. 599.https://doi.org/10.1143/PTP.70.599
- Mancini, F. (1996) 'The Birth of Thermo Field Dynamics'. Phys.Essays 9, p 624-627 https://physicsessays.org/browse-journal-2/product/741-volume-9-no-4-december-1996.html
- Mancini, F. (2003) 'Composite operators and algebra constraints: a formalism for highly interacting systems', AIP Conference Proceedings, 695, pp. 240–257. https://doi.org/10.1063/1.1639593
