= Italian public administration =

Italian public bodies

The Italian public administration (in acronym IPA, in italian PA), in the Italian legal system, indicates the set of public bodies belonging to the public administration of the Italian Republic.

== History ==
With the proclamation of the Kingdom of Italy and the simultaneous adoption of the Albertine Statute, the ownership of the organizing function belonged to the same organization that provided it through acts of self-regulation. Apart from the extreme case of military organization, which gave rise to relations of special supremacy, the organizing function was the responsibility of the government.

After the public administration on the model of the Kingdom of Sardinia for decades had been headed by a new unitary state with centralized management powers (which in fact also conditioned the exercise of the management powers of the few other existing territorial bodies), the Giolitti II Cabinet - with the start of the nationalization of the Italian railways - had adopted the model of the autonomous company, voted to introduce elements of economy in the traditional approach of the public function of French ancestry. The rejection of this model by fascism produced a phenomenon that has remained essentially Italian: "the choice of the alternative model of the public body and the consequent" flight from the administration "that derives from it represent the solution to the contradiction between the demands for a more "efficient" and "industrial" state and the requirements of legality and organizational uniformity: the autonomous company, placed under the direct control of the minister, constitutes only a partial response to this order of problems; entity with its own legal personality already represents a more drastic step towards the establishment of that "parallel bureaucracy" that fascism will increasingly place alongside traditional administration, sanctioning the birth of the autarchic body, and subsequently of the public body cheap.

With the birth of the Italian Republic and the entry into force of the Constitution, articles 97 and 98 of the Charter accepted the opposite solution, attributing the ownership of the organizing function to the Parliament of the Italian Republic, which exercises it through acts of heteronormation, thus sanctioning the absolute primacy of the principle of legality. From the point of view of the organization of the administrative bodies of the State, the Constitution sanctioned the transition from a centralized organization, where the administrative functions were attributed to the central organs of the State, to a decentralized organization, where instead the functions administrative activities are carried out by local authorities at the local level.

The perimeter of the Italian public sector has been redefined several times over time by organic reforms starting after the Second World War, in parallel with the administrative decentralization in Italy in implementation of Articles 5, 114 and 118 of the constitutional charter: among the various norms, the law 16 May 1970, n. 281, and the law 22 July 1975, n. 382 which as a consequence transferred various competences to the municipalities and regions of Italy, the establishment of the general accounting of the State (law 5 August 1978, no. 468), the Provincial Single Treasury Service (law 29 October 1984, no. 720 ), the administrative procedure and access to documents (law 7 August 1990, no. 241), and from the contractualization of public employment in Italy implemented since the 1990s (law 29 March 1983, no. 93 and Legislative Decree February 3, 1993, n. 29) - which introduced the possibility for employees to join trade unions - reforming the entire activity on the basis of various criteria as required by the Bassanini laws. The discipline of the employment relationship was then collected in d. lgs. March 30, 2001, n. 165; finally, the Brunetta reform of 2009 introduced the principle of result-based remuneration, linked to the activity of employees.

== Constitutional principles ==
=== The principle of legality ===
Article 97 provides that public offices are organized according to the provisions of the law. Purposes, rights and obligations, powers, limits and instruments of the Italian public administration are defined by the primary rules and by Community law. Its foundation is found directly in art. 113 of the Constitution, which establishes the judicial protection of those having the right or legitimate interest to act against any administrative act.

The Regional Administrative Court can annul an act for violation of the principle of legality, where there is no specific rule that attributes the power exercised through it to the public authority.

The principle of legality has limited the power of ministers vis-à-vis the public administration enshrined in art. 95, in particular for matters subject to legal reserve, with respect to which therefore the administration cannot proceed in the absence of a primary rule. The power of ministers is also subordinate to the principle of legality.

=== The principle of typicality ===
Authoritarian powers can only be exercised if, by whom, when and as required by law. The Constitution provides for a specific legal reserve for measures that affect people's freedoms (art. 41, c. 3) and citizens' assets (art. 23).

The art. 113 provides that the compliance of administrative acts with the law must be able to be verified by a judge (so-called "justiciability"). However, the law provides for contingent and urgent ordinances for which the law indicates the conditions and competent bodies, but not the effects of the law (for example the provisions of the mayors in terms of health, construction, hygiene and local police regulations).

=== The principle of proportionality ===
It is a principle inherent in the legal system and made explicit by community jurisprudence, for example in the EC Treaty (art. 86, paragraph 2). It affirms that the measures must be preordained, necessary and sufficient for a lawful and legitimate purpose without affecting subjective positions to a greater extent than is objectively indispensable in relation to that purpose.

=== The principle of subsidiarity ===
The principle of administrative decentralization was already enshrined in art. 5, in the part of the fundamental principles. The art. 114 established the autonomy principle of decentralized local authorities. The reform of Title V of the Constitution of the Italian Republic attributed to the Municipalities the competence of the administration as a general principle, without prejudice to the principle of adequacy, reflecting those of impartiality and good performance, which legitimized the centralization of certain functions and services at a higher level of administration than the municipal one.

The 2001 reform redistributed legislative power in Italy between the state and the regions and introduced the principle of subsidiarity in the administration. In the intentions of the legislator, it should have started a process of reorganizing the entire public presence in the territory, to strengthen local autonomies, however this has often given rise to conflicts between local administrations and the central State.

=== Impartiality and "good performance" ===
In the Republican age, the evolution of the model of public administration carried out by a public body other than the territorial body produced - under the validity of Article 97 of the Constitution - a "pursuit" of public guarantees in the management of human resources, instrumental and financial. It is based on the concept of the administration of results and has as its purpose the full realization of the principles of efficiency and effectiveness, corollaries of the principle of good performance pursuant to art. 97 of the Constitution.

Among the main tools for the pursuit of constitutional purposes there are also the administrative and accounting jurisdiction: the affirmation of the latter also towards companies deriving from the transformation of public economic entities into joint stock companies (as long as the participation remains majority of the State or other public authorities to the share capital) was sanctioned by the Constitutional Court with the sentence of 28 December 1993, n. 466, delivered following a conflict of powers raised by the Court of Auditors.

== Bibliography ==
- Sabino Cassese, La statistica nell’amministrazione pubblica (Storia e problemi attuali), in “Rivista trimestrale di diritto pubblico”, 1979, n. 2–3, pp. 545–567 and in Esiste un governo in Italia?, pp. 181–206 (v. n. 246).
- Sabino Cassese, Las istituciones administrativas en la historia de la Italia unificada, in “Revista de la Universitad de Buenos Aires”, 1979, vol. II, pp. 221–233.
- Sabino Cassese, I caratteri originali della storia amministrativa italiana, in “Le Carte e la Storia. Rivista di storia delle istituzioni, 1999, n. 1, pp. 7-15.
- Sabino Cassese, La riforma della pubblica amministrazione italiana, in “Il lavoro nelle pubbliche amministrazioni”, 2000, n. 6, pp. 1007–1017.
- Anthony Barnes Atkinson, Measurement of Government Output and Productivity for the National Accounts, PALGRAVE MACMILLAN, New York, 2005.
