= International Journal of Medical Sciences =

- Discipline: Medicine
- Language: English
- Edited by: Dennis D. Taub

Publication details
- History: 2004–present
- Publisher: Ivyspring International Publisher
- Frequency: 10/year
- Open access: Yes
- License: CC BY
- Impact factor: 3.2 (2023)

Standard abbreviations
- ISO 4: Int. J. Med. Sci.

Indexing
- CODEN: IJMSGZ
- ISSN: 1449-1907
- OCLC no.: 54900446

Links
- Journal homepage; Online access; Online archive

The International Journal of Medical Sciences is a peer-reviewed open access medical journal published by Ivyspring International Publisher covering research in basic medical sciences. Articles include original research papers, reviews, and short research communications. The editor-in-chief is Dennis D. Taub (National Institute on Aging).

== Abstracting and indexing ==
The journal is abstracted and indexed in:

- CAB Abstracts
- Chemical Abstracts Service
- Current Contents/Clinical Medicine
- Embase
- Index Medicus/MEDLINE/PubMed
- Science Citation Index Expanded
- Scopus

According to the Journal Citation Reports, the journal has a 2023 impact factor of 3.2.
