= Deaths in September 1985 =

The following is a list of notable deaths in September 1985.

Entries for each day are listed alphabetically by surname. A typical entry lists information in the following sequence:

- Name, age, country of citizenship at birth, subsequent country of citizenship (if applicable), reason for notability, cause of death (if known), and reference.

== September 1985 ==
=== 1 ===
- Robert S. Babcock, 70, American politician, lieutenant governor of Vermont (1959–1961).
- Stefan Bellof, 27, German racing driver, racing crash.
- Laxmikant Bhembre, 79, Indian writer and liberation activist.
- Lloyd Davenport, 73, American baseball player.
- Eileen de Coppet, Princess of Albania, 62, English-American socialite.
- Sir David Derham, 65, Australian jurist and academic administrator.
- Tom Stanley Hepworth, 69, Australian educator.
- Sir Muhammad Zafarullah Khan, 92, Pakistani diplomat.
- Saunders Lewis, 91, Welsh politician and writer.
- Richie Panch, 31, American racing driver, plane crash.
- Sir James Pitman, 84, English educationalist and politician, MP (1945–1964).
- Evelyn Sharp, Baroness Sharp, 82, British civil servant.
- Dale Singleton, 30, American motorcycle racer, plane crash.
- Harold H. Velde, 75, American politician, member of the U.S. House of Representatives (1949–1957).

=== 2 ===
- Anna Banti, 90, Italian writer.
- Yvonne Barrett, 39, Australian singer, strangled.
- Gershon Benjamin, 86, Romanian-born American painter.
- Eveline M. Burns, 85, American economist.
- Donald Craik, 54, Canadian politician.
- Eleanor Layfield Davis, 73-74, American painter.
- V. Dharmalingam, 67, Sri Lankan politician, MP (1960–1983), shot.
- John Oscar Egeland, 94, Norwegian shipping magnate.
- Gonzalo Güell, 90, Cuban politician, prime minister (1958–1959).
- Bob Kinney, 64, American basketball player.
- Abe Lenstra, 64, Dutch footballer.
- Nils Sæbø, 88, Norwegian Olympic equestrian (1936).
- Alex Stevenson, 73, Irish footballer.
- Sir Hugh Walmsley, 87, British RAF commander.
- Jay Youngblood, 30, American professional wrestler, complications from a heart attack.

=== 3 ===
- Alexis I. du Pont Bayard, 67, American politician, lieutenant governor of Delaware (1949–1953), complications from surgery.
- Jocelyn Bonham-Carter, 81, English cricketer and civil servant.
- He Zhuguo, 87-88, Chinese general.
- Jo Jones, 73, American jazz drummer, pneumonia.
- Frank Kilby, 79, New Zealand rugby player.
- Dragan Mance, 22, Yugoslav footballer, traffic collision.
- Johnny Marks, 75, American songwriter ("Rudolph, the Red-Nosed Reindeer", "Rockin' Around the Christmas Tree", "A Holly Jolly Christmas"), complications from diabetes.
- Bonaro W. Overstreet, 82, American author, stroke.
- Gilles Thomas, 55, French author.

=== 4 ===
- Larry Beauregard, 28, Canadian flautist, colon cancer.
- Art Bramhall, 76, American baseball, basketball and football player.
- Michel Brunet, 68, Canadian historian.
- Andrzej Chudziński, 36, Polish Olympic swimmer (1972).
- Isabel Jeans, 93, English actress (Gigi).
- Lidija Liepiņa, 94, Soviet Latvian chemist.
- Mira Mihelič, 73, Yugoslav writer.
- José Nozari, 71-72, Mexican Olympic sports shooter (1948).
- George O'Brien, 86, American actor (Sunrise: A Song of Two Humans).
- Georgeann Robinson, 67, American Osage artist.
- Oldřich Sedlák, 62, Czechoslovak ice hockey player.
- Vasyl Stus, 47, Soviet Ukrainian dissident, starvation.

=== 5 ===
- George Arnott, 84, Australian footballer.
- Jimmy Cotter, 26, New Zealand rugby player, traffic collision.
- Tibor Czorba, 78-79, Hungarian artist.
- Gerald Dreyer, 55, South African boxer.
- Maud Johnson, 66-67, American journalist and author.
- Albert Larsen, 84, Danish Olympic runner (1924, 1928).
- Jim McGlone, 88, Australian footballer.
- Philip M. Morse, 82, American physicist.
- Mieczysław Mümler, 85, Polish-English flying ace.
- Carolynne Snowden, 85, American actress and singer.
- Jiřina Štěpničková, 73, Czechoslovak actress.
- Rupert Tang Choon, 71, Trinidadian cricketer.
- Willem van der Oord, 65, Dutch hydraulic engineer.
- Blaine Walsh, 60, American sportscaster.

=== 6 ===
- J. R. Bailey, 48, American singer and songwriter.
- Johnny Desmond, 65, American singer, cancer.
- Jane Frazee, 70, American actress, pneumonia.
- Heydar Ghiai, 62, Iranian-French architect.
- Little Brother Montgomery, 79, American jazz and blues musician.
- Léon Orthel, 79, Dutch composer.
- Rodney Porter, 67, British biochemist, Nobel Prize recipient (1972), traffic collision.
- Richiardi Jr, 61, Peruvian-American magician.
- Barnet J. Segal, 87, American businessman and investor.
- Shi Liang, 85, Chinese lawyer and jurist.
- Tscherim Soobzokov, 61, Russian-born American spy and Nazi collaborator, injuries sustained in an explosion.
- Joseph Janney Steinmetz, 79, American photographer.
- Dick Zoll, 71, American football player.

=== 7 ===
- Ferenc Csanádi, 60, Hungarian football manager.
- Tom Fena, 75, American football player.
- Harold Gomberg, 68, American oboist, heart attack.
- George Heywood, 78, English footballer.
- Patrick Kelly, 67, South African-born Scottish footballer.
- Bruiser Kinard, 70, American football player, complications from Alzheimer's disease.
- Nazim Osmanov, 46, Soviet Uzbek politician.
- Ivy Parker, 77, American chemist.
- Josef Věromír Pleva, 86, Czechoslovak children's author.
- George Pólya, 97, Hungarian-American mathematician, complications from a stroke.
- Viv Randall, 71, Australian footballer.
- Finn Seemann, 40, Norwegian footballer, traffic collision.
- Doris Svedlund, 58, Swedish actress.
- Jacoba van Velde, 82, Dutch novelist.
- Sir Ellis Waterhouse, 80, English art historian, heart attack.
- José Zabala-Santos, 74, Filipino cartoonist.

=== 8 ===
- Harry Bailey, 62, Australian psychiatrist, suicide by drug overdose.
- John Franklin Enders, 88, American virologist, Nobel Prize recipient (1954).
- Buck Jones, 96, American football player.
- Norman Magee, 62, Canadian politician.
- Frederick May, 74, Irish composer.
- Ana Mendieta, 36, Cuban-American artist, fall.
- Emmy Brady Rogers, 87, American pianist.
- Jim Shanahan, 84, Australian footballer.

=== 9 ===
- John Baker, Baron Baker, 84, British structural engineer.
- Patrick Burke, 81, Irish politician, TD (1944–1973).
- Neil Davis, 51, Australian photojournalist, tank fire.
- Paul Flory, 75, American chemist, Nobel Prize recipient (1974), heart attack.
- Rod Funseth, 52, American golfer, cancer.
- Ernesto Ganelli, 84, Italian architect.
- Robert Henderson, 80, American actor.
- Yaacob Abdul Latiff, 67, Malaysian politician, mayor of Kuala Lumpur (1972–1980).
- Luis Padilla Nervo, 91, Mexican diplomat.
- Sun Zhen, 93, Chinese general.
- Antonino Votto, 88, Italian opera conductor.
- Ahmad Zamir, 55, Pakistani naval admiral.

=== 10 ===
- Alex Buchanan, 79, MP (1955–1972).
- Chong Yun Jing, 22, Singaporean administrative officer, medical malpractice.
- Marianus Czerny, 89, German physicist.
- M. L. Ahamed Fareeth, 45, Sri Lankan politician, MP (since 1977).
- Ettore Maria Fizzarotti, 69, Italian filmmaker.
- John Goleby, 50, Australian politician.
- Ebbie Goodfellow, 78, Canadian ice hockey player, cancer.
- Guy Thompson Griffith, 77, English historian.
- Chakali Ilamma, 89, Indian independence activist.
- Bonifaty Kedrov, 81, Soviet philosopher.
- Alexa Kenin, 23, American actress.
- Werner Meyer, 71, Swiss Olympic handball player (1936).
- Ernst Öpik, 91, Estonian-Northern Irish astrophysicist.
- Samuel Oshoffa, 75, Nigerian evangelist, traffic collision.
- Jock Stein, 62, Scottish football player and manager, pulmonary edema.

=== 11 ===
- William Alwyn, 79, English composer.
- Dame Henrietta Barnett, 80, English RAF commander.
- Eleanor Dark, 84, Australian novelist (The Timeless Land, Prelude to Christopher, Return to Coolami).
- Emmy Klieneberger-Nobel, 93, German microbiologist.
- Federico Melchor, 70, Spanish politician and journalist.
- Masako Natsume, 27, Japanese actress, leukemia.
- David Rioch, 85, American neuroanatomist.
- Jean Albert Sulpice, 72, French curler.
- Andrew C. Thornton II, 40, American drug smuggler and narcotics officer, fall.
- Fred Urmson, 77, English footballer.
- Luigi Velluti, 76, Italian sculptor.

=== 12 ===
- Sylvia Benton, 98, British archaeologist.
- Maurice Anthony Biot, 80, Belgian-American physicist.
- Bartolome Cabangbang, 67, Filipino politician, stroke.
- Frank Carpay, 68, Dutch-New Zealand industrial engineer.
- Franz Josef Conrad, 41, German politician.
- Galina Dzhunkovskaya, 62, Soviet navigator.
- Herb Eisele, 81, American football coach.
- Raymond Fife, 12, American murder victim.
- John Kerans, 70, British naval officer and politician, MP (1959–1964).
- Tom Knowles, 77, English rugby player.
- Galo Ocampo, 71, Filipino artist, cardiac arrest.
- Sam Reese, 55, American actor, stroke.
- Namik Resuli, 77, Albanian linguist.
- Steamboat Struss, 76, American baseball player.

=== 13 ===
- Allan Bergkvist, 77, Swedish chess player.
- E. L. M. Burns, 88, Canadian general and diplomat.
- Winifred Cecil, 78, American opera singer.
- George Roche Evans, 62, American Roman Catholic prelate.
- Kim Yong-woo, 73, South Korean scouting leader.
- J. P. Kuiper, 63, Dutch social medicine professor.
- Gordon Lawson, 85, New Zealand rugby player.
- Stan McKenzie, 89, Australian footballer.
- Art Murakowski, 60, American football player.
- Odhise Paskali, 71, Albanian sculptor.
- Charles D. Phelps, 47, American ophthalmologist, cancer.
- Andy Philipsen, 45-46, Canadian politician, traffic collision.
- Augusto Rademaker, 80, Brazilian naval admiral and politician, vice president (1969–1974).
- Sam Reese, 55, American actor. (death announced on this date)
- Dane Rudhyar, 90, American astrologer, writer and composer.
- Muriel Smith, 62, American singer, cancer.
- Hugo Spadafora, 45, Panamanian physician, mercenary and dissident, beheaded.
- Hans Raj Vohra, 75-76, Indian journalist and approver.
- Peter Wright, 77, Australian mining executive.

=== 14 ===
- Frank Baker, 76, American football player.
- Julian Beck, 60, American actor, stomach cancer.
- Albert Bennett, 75, English cricketer.
- Kath Bonnin, 74, Australian nurse.
- Ernie Collihole, 54, Australian footballer.
- Claire Cribbs, 73, American basketball player.
- Bob Danskin, 77, English footballer.
- Bakhshi Galandarli, 82, Soviet Azerbaijani actor and theatre director.
- Worth Tuttle Hedden, 89, American author.
- John Holt, 62, American educator and author (How Children Fail), cancer.
- Niel Morgan, 81, Welsh cricketer and diplomat.
- Joselito Rodríguez, 78, Mexican film director.

=== 15 ===
- Wolfgang Abendroth, 79, German political scientist and jurist.
- Bruno Banducci, 63, Italian-born American football player, heart attack.
- Norman Banks, 79, Australian radio announcer and television presenter.
- Kálmán Czakó, 66, Hungarian jurist.
- René De Smet, 54, Belgian racing cyclist.
- Marcel Dyf, 85, French painter.
- Eureka Forbes, 80, American politician, member of the Hawaii House of Representatives (1959–1966) and Senate (1966–1974).
- Dick Godlove, 80, American college sports coach.
- Maurice Grosclaude, 85, French Olympic runner (1924).
- Pinchas Litvinovsky, 91, Russian-born Israeli painter.
- Nick Paithouski, 67, Canadian footballer.
- William B. Willcox, 77, American historian, cancer.
- Cootie Williams, 74, American trumpeter, kidney disease.
- Alexei Yepishev, 77, Soviet diplomat, politician and general.

=== 16 ===
- Einari Aalto, 59, Finnish Olympic swimmer (1952).
- Victor Bourdillon, 88, South African-born Zimbabwean cricketer.
- John Lloyd, 77, Canadian politician.
- Malcolm Pitt, 88, American college sports coach.
- Birgit Ridderstedt, 70, Swedish folk singer.
- Art Scholl, 53, American stunt pilot, plane crash.
- Herb Trawick, 64, Canadian football player.
- Kurt Wegner, 77, German artist.

=== 17 ===
- Laura Ashley, 60, Welsh fashion designer, complications from a fall.
- Carmen Barth, 73, American Olympic boxer (1932).
- John Bowle, 79, English historian.
- Henry Stuart Carter, 75, American politician, member of the Virginia House of Delegates (1948–1960).
- James Mercer, 69, Ghanaian diplomat.
- Fred Polak, 78, Dutch futurologist.
- Petter Ravn, 76, Norwegian footballer.
- Fran Ross, 50, American author (Oreo), cancer.
- Gerrit Van Roekel, 86, American politician, member of the Iowa House of Representatives (1967–1971).
- Hurtle Willsmore, 95, Australian cricketer.

=== 18 ===
- Monroe Beardsley, 69, American art philosopher.
- Roderick Cameron, 71, American travel writer, AIDS.
- Iorwerth Evans, 79, Welsh rugby player.
- Louis G. Friedrichs, 68, American football player and coach.
- Ed Don George, 80, American professional wrestler.
- A. Earl Hedrick, 89, American art director.
- Gerald Holtom, 71, English artist, designer of the peace sign.
- Arthur Goodwin Hudson, 80, Australian Anglican prelate.
- Ed Lewis, 76, American jazz trumpeter.
- Walter James Nungester, 84, American immunologist.
- Don Otten, 64, American basketball player.
- Harvey Parry, 85, American stuntman and actor.
- John Kingsley Read, 49, British politician.
- Charles Rowley, 78, Australian academic.
- Theodore O. Yntema, 85, American economist and business executive.

=== 19 ===
- Bob Barnwell, 69, American football and basketball coach.
- Italo Calvino, 61, Italian writer (Cosmicomics, Invisible Cities), complications from a stroke.
- Rockdrigo González, 34, Mexican singer-songwriter, earthquake.
- Charlie Holmes, 75, American saxophonist.
- Emila Medková, 56, Czechoslovak photographer.
- Charles E. Thornton, 50, American journalist, missile strike.
- Hans Weidel, 82, German jurist and Nazi activist.
- Klaus Wittkugel, 74, German artist.

=== 20 ===
- Karl Angerstein, 94, German general.
- Tommy D'Arcy, 53, Scottish footballer.
- Irmgard Enderle, 90, German politician and journalist.
- Eileen Furley, 85, Australian politician.
- Grace Jordan, 93, American writer and journalist.
- Taizo Kawamoto, 71, Japanese footballer.
- Guy L'Écuyer, 54, Canadian actor.
- Ernest Nagel, 83, Austrian-born American sociologist, pneumonia.
- Dick Ottele, 58, American football player.
- Alexander Sagadin, 70, Austrian Olympic equestrian (1956).
- Ruhi Su, 72-73, Turkish singer, prostate cancer.

=== 21 ===
- Claire de Lorez, 90, American actress.
- Paul Ernst, 85, American writer.
- Gu Long, 47, Hong Kong-born Taiwanese filmmaker and novelist, cirrhosis.
- Jeff Jefferson, 63, American baseball player.
- Anzelmas Matutis, 62, Soviet Lithuanian poet.
- Ethel Rudkin, 91-92, English writer and folklorist.
- Isabel Grenfell Quallo, 92, Congolese-born British-American community activist.
- Amarnath Vidyalankar, 82, Indian politician, MP (1952–1967, 1971–1977).

=== 22 ===
- Robert Elmore, 72, American composer.
- Charles Errickson, 87, American college sports coach.
- Dickie Henderson, 62, English comedian and actor, pancreatic cancer.
- Reidar Jørgensen, 80, Norwegian Olympic runner (1928) and botanist.
- Nico Kasanda, 46, Congolese musician.
- Endre Nemes, 75, Hungarian-born Swedish artist.
- D. J. Opperman, 70, South African poet.
- Robinsón Pitalúa, 21, Colombian Olympic boxer (1984), drowned.
- Philippe Pottier, 47, Swiss footballer.
- Edwin Schutte, 79, American basketball coach.
- Axel Springer, 73, German publisher and businessman, heart attack.
- Geneviève Tabouis, 92, French historian and journalist.
- Edward Allen Tamm, 79, American jurist and intelligence agent, cancer.

=== 23 ===
- Stefan Dembicki, 72, French footballer.
- Coe Glade, 85, American opera singer.
- Malcolm Mercer Hollett, 93, Canadian politician.
- Saturno Meletti, 78-79, Italian opera singer.
- Phil O'Connor, 31, English-Australian footballer, traffic collision.
- Charles Phillips, 84, British archaeologist.
- Herman Seborg, 78, American football player.
- Larry Shue, 39, American actor, plane crash.
- Mickey Simpson, 71, American actor, heart failure.
- Charlie Tyson, 87, Australian footballer.

=== 24 ===
- Hal C. Banks, 76, Canadian trade unionist, heart disease.
- Ángel Custodio Loyola, 59, Venezuelan songwriter and singer.
- Cor Kools, 78, Dutch footballer.
- Ron Lewin, 65, English footballer.
- David Lewis, 76, American jurist.
- Paul Mann, 71, Canadian actor, stroke.
- Elizabeth Sadoques Mason, 88, American nurse.
- Antonio Poma, 75, Italian Roman Catholic cardinal.
- Odd Schjerve, 51, Norwegian businessman.
- Henno Sepmann, 60, Estonian architect.

=== 25 ===
- Bill Banker, 78, American football player, heart attack.
- Margaret Fishback, 85, American poet.
- Herbert Greene, 64, American conductor and musical director, heart attack.
- Zofia Jaroszewska, 83, Polish actress.
- Orlando Martins, 85, Nigerian actor.
- Albert Moeschinger, 88, Swiss composer.
- Oleksandr Perviy, 24, Soviet Ukrainian Olympic weightlifter (1980), heart attack.
- Chelikani Venkata Rama Rao, 84, Indian politician.
- George Ronald Richards, 79, British-born Australian intelligence operative.
- William Cumming Rose, 98, American biochemist.
- Hans Schmoller, 69, German-British typographer.
- Moshe Zvi Segal, 81, Ukrainian-born Israeli rabbi.
- Jay Sommers, 68, American television producer (Green Acres, Petticoat Junction), heart disease.
- Tommy Treacy, 81, Irish hurler.
- Werner Vordtriede, 70, German-American language professor.

=== 26 ===
- Frank Bracht, 75, American film editor.
- Tatton Brinton, 69, British politician, MP (1964–1974).
- Peter Craigie, 47, British biblical scholar, traffic collision.
- Pierre Dufau, 77, French architect.
- Charles Gonnet, 87, French poet.
- Reuben Hill, 73, American sociologist, heart attack.
- Anton Janda, 81, Austrian footballer.
- Max Leslie, 82, American naval admiral.
- Jacques Locas, 59, Canadian ice hockey player.
- Colin McLachlan, 60, New Zealand politician, MP (1966–1981).
- Lloyd Nosler, 84, American filmmaker.
- Checco Rissone, 76, Italian actor.
- Yona Wallach, 41, Israeli poet, breast cancer.

=== 27 ===
- Ernie Dickens, 64, Canadian football and ice hockey player.
- Iris du Pré, 71, English pianist and composer.
- Eugenio Gaddini, 69, Italian physician.
- Dirk Geijskes, 78, Dutch biologist and ethnologist.
- Leonard Gribble, 77, English writer.
- Nikolai Gulayev, 67, Soviet flying ace.
- Paul McNulty, 83, American football player.
- Lloyd Nolan, 83, American actor (The Caine Mutiny Court-Martial), lung cancer.
- Ryūtarō Ōtomo, 73, Japanese actor.
- Estanislao Shilinsky, 74, Lithuanian-born Mexican comedian.
- Bruce Smalls, 30, American police officer, shot.
- Herb Wallerstein, 59, American television and film producer, bludgeoned.
- G. P. Wells, 84, British zoologist.
- Joanna Wichmann, 80, German artist.

=== 28 ===
- L. B. Abbott, 77, American cinematographer.
- Josef Dobeš, 81, Czechoslovak Olympic equestrian (1936).
- Roy Genders, 72, English cricketer.
- Hec Highton, 61, Canadian ice hockey player.
- Ellen Isefiær, 85, Norwegian actress and director.
- André Kertész, 91, Hungarian-American photographer.
- Henry Lamar, 79, American college sports coach.
- Papaliʻi Laupepa, 44, Samoan politician.
- Maurice Jupurrurla Luther, 39-40, Australian education advocate.
- Gohar Mamajiwala, 74, Indian actress and singer.
- Richard C. Mangrum, 78, American general.
- Zdzisław Michalski, 57, Polish Olympic rower (1952).
- Zaki Osman, 86-87, Egyptian footballer.
- Lobsang Samten Taklha, 51-52, Tibetan politician and medical director.
- Robert Lyster Thornton, 76, British-American physicist.
- Laurie Walquist, 87, American football player.

=== 29 ===
- Oswald Cheesman, 72, New Zealand musician.
- Helmut Damerius, 79, German theatre director.
- Abdallah Farhat, 71, Tunisian politician.
- Charles K. Fletcher, 82, American politician and banker, member of the U.S. House of Representatives (1947–1949), cancer.
- Joan Fry, 79, British tennis player.
- Victor Gold, 63, Austrian-born British chemist.
- Sukemasa Irie, 80, Japanese essayist.
- Aubrey Rodway Johnson, 84, British linguist and biblical scholar.
- Arthur Krams, 73, American set designer.
- Timothy McAuliffe, 76, Irish politician, senator (1961–1969, 1973–1983).
- John J. Sawtelle, 91, American politician.
- Esmond Wickremesinghe, 65, Sri Lankan politician and media proprietor.
- Archie Williams, 58, Scottish footballer.
- Mieczysław Zub, 31, Polish convicted serial killer, suicide.

=== 30 ===
- Herbert Bayer, 85, Austrian-American artist and architect.
- Paul Berlenbach, 84, American boxer.
- Marcus Boyall, 67, Australian footballer.
- Floyd Crosby, 85, American cinematographer (Tabu: A Story of the South Seas).
- Carlo de Ferrariis Salzano, 80, Italian diplomat.
- John P. Humes, 64, American diplomat, stroke.
- Marnie Kennedy, 65-66, Australian writer.
- Pierre Lacans, 28, French rugby player.
- Helen MacInnes, 77, Scottish-American novelist, complications from a stroke.
- Konstanty Mackiewicz, 90, Polish painter.
- Doel Reed, 91, American painter, printmaker, and educator
- Charles Richter, 85, American seismologist, developer of the Richter scale, heart failure.
- Al Romero, 74, Mexican Olympic boxer (1932).
- Robert Shtilmark, 76, Soviet author and journalist.
- Simone Signoret, 64, French actress (Room at the Top, Casque d'Or, The Crucible), pancreatic cancer.
- Carl Ueter, 85, German composer.
