= Mekong River Commission =

Intergovernmental organization that manages the water resources of the Mekong River

- Abbreviation: MRC
- Predecessor: Mekong Committee, Interim Mekong Committee
- Formation: April 5, 1995; 31 years ago
- Legal status: 1995 Mekong Agreement
- Headquarters: Vientiane, Laos
- Region served: Southeast Asia
- Members: Cambodia, Laos, Thailand, Vietnam
- Main organ: Council, Joint Committee and MRC Secretariat
- Staff: 64
- Website: www.mrcmekong.org

The Mekong River Commission (MRC) is an "...inter-governmental organisation that works directly with the governments of Cambodia, Laos, Thailand, and Vietnam to jointly manage the shared water resources and the sustainable development of the Mekong River". Its mission is "To promote and coordinate sustainable management and development of water and related resources for the countries' mutual benefit and the people's well-being".

== History ==
=== Mekong Committee (1957–1978) ===
The origins of the Mekong Committee are linked to the legacy of (de)colonialism in Indochina and subsequent geopolitical developments. The political, social, and economic conditions of the Mekong River basin countries evolved dramatically since the 1950s, when the Mekong represented the "only large river left in the world, besides the Amazon, which remained virtually unexploited." The impetus for the creation of the Mekong cooperative regime progressed in tandem with the drive for the development of the lower Mekong, following the 1954 Geneva Conference which granted Cambodia, Laos, and Vietnam independence from France. A 1957 United Nations Economic Commission for Asia and the Far East (ECAFE) report, Development of Water Resources in the Lower Mekong Basin, recommended development to the tune of 90,000 km^{2} of irrigation and 13.7 gigawatts (GW) from five dams. Based largely on the recommendations of ECAFE, the "Committee for Coordination on the Lower Mekong Basin" (known as the Mekong Committee) was established in September 1957 with the adoption of the Statute for the Committee for Coordination of Investigations into the Lower Mekong Basin. ECAFE's Bureau of Flood Control had prioritized the Mekong—of the 18 international waterways within its jurisdiction—in the hopes of creating a precedent for cooperation elsewhere. and "one of the UN's earliest spin-offs", as the organization functioned under the aegis of the UN, with its Executive Agent (EA) chosen from the career staff of the United Nations Development Programme (UNDP).

The US government—which feared that poverty in the basin would contribute to the strength of communist movements—proved one of the most vocal international backers of the committee, with the U.S. Bureau of Reclamation conducting a seminal 1956 study on the basin's potential. Another 1962 study by U.S. geographer Gilbert F. White, Economic and Social Aspects of Lower Mekong Development, proved extremely influential, resulting in the postponement of (in White's own estimation) the construction of the (still unrealized) mainstream Pa Mong Dam, which would have displaced a quarter-million people. The influence of the United States in the committee's formation can also been seen in development studies of General Raymond Wheeler, the former Chief of the Army Corps of Engineers, the role of C. Hart Schaaf as the Mekong Committee's Executive Agent from 1959 to 1969, and President Lyndon Johnson’s promotion of the committee as having the potential to "dwarf even our own T.V.A." However, US financial support was terminated in 1975 and did not resume for decades due to embargoes against Cambodia (until 1992) and Vietnam (until 1994), followed by periods of trade restrictions. However, Makim argues that the committee was "largely unaffected by formal or informal U.S. preferences" given the ambivalence of some riparians about US technical support, in particular Cambodia's rejection of some specific types of assistance. However, the fact remains that "international development agencies have always paid the bills for the Mekong regime," with European (especially Scandinavian) nations picking up the slack left by the United States, and then (to a lesser extent) Japan.

The Mekong Committee was a forceful advocate for large-scale dams and other projects, primarily preoccupied with facilitating projects. For example, the 1970 Indicative Basin Plan called for 30,000 km^{2} of irrigation by the year 2000 (up from 2,130 km^{2}) as well as 87 short-term tributary development projects and 17 long-term development projects on the mainstream. The Indicative Basin Plan was crafted largely in response to criticisms of the committee's "piecemeal" approach and declining political support of the organization; for example, the committee had received no funds from Thailand, normally the biggest contributor, during the 1970 fiscal year. The completion of all 17 projects was never intended; rather the list was meant to serve as a "menu" for international donors, who were to select 9 or 10 of the projects. While a few of the short-term projects were implemented, none of the long-term projects prevailed in the political climate of the ensuing decade, which included the end of the Vietnam War in 1975. Several tributary dams were constructed, but only one—the Nam Ngum Dam (completed 1971), in Laos—outside of Thailand, whose electricity was sold to Thailand. According to Makim, Nam Ngum was the "only truly intergovernmental project achieved" by the committee.

This period was also marked by efforts to expand the jurisdiction and mandate of the committee between 1958 and 1975, which did not receive the consent of all four riparians. However, these efforts culminated, in January 1975, in the adoption of a 35-article Joint Declaration of Principles for Utilization of the Waters of the Mekong Basin by the sixty-eighth session of the Mekong Committee, prohibiting the "unilateral appropriation" without "prior approval" and "extra-basin diversion" without unanimous consent. However, no committee sessions were held in 1976 or 1977, as no plenipotentiary members had been appointed by Cambodia, Laos, or Vietnam—all of which experienced regime change in 1975.

=== Interim Mekong Committee (1978–1995) ===
Mekong River

The rise of the xenophobic and paranoid Khmer Rouge government in Cambodia made Cambodia's continued participation unsustainable, so in April 1977 the other three riparians agreed to the Declaration Concerning the Interim Mekong Committee, which resulted in the establishment of the Interim Mekong Committee in January 1978. The weakened interim organization was only able to study large-scale projects and implement a few small-scale projects in Thailand and Laos, where the Dutch Government through the IMC funded fisheries and agricultural development projects along the Nam Ngum, as well as port facilities at Keng Kabao near Savannakhet; the institutional role of the organization shifted nonetheless largely to data collection. The 1987 Revised Indicative Basin Plan—the high-water mark of the Interim Committee's activity—scaled back the ambitions of the 1970 plan, envisioning a cascade of smaller dams along the Mekong's mainstream, divided into 29 projects, 26 of which were strictly national in scope. The Revised Indicative Basin Plan can also be seen as laying the groundwork for Cambodia's readmission. The Supreme National Council of Cambodia did request readmission in June 1991.

Cambodia's readmission was largely a side-show which masked the true issue facing the riparians: that the rapid economic growth experienced in Thailand relative to its neighbors had made even the modest sovereignty limitations imposed by Mekong agreements seem undesirable in Bangkok. Thailand and the other three riparians (led by Vietnam, the most powerful of the remaining three states) were locked in disagreement over whether Cambodia should be readmitted under the terms of the 1957 Statute (and more importantly, the 1975 Joint Declaration), with Thailand preferring to negotiate an entirely new framework to allow its planned Kong-Chi-Moon Project (and others) to proceed without a Vietnamese veto. Article 10 of the Joint Declaration, requiring unanimous consent for all mainstream development and inter-basin diversion proved to be the main sticking point of Cambodia's readmission, with Thailand perhaps prepared to walk away from the regime altogether. The conflict came to a head in April 1992 when Thailand forced the executive agent of the committee, Chuck Lankester, to resign and leave the country after barring the secretariat from the March 1992 meeting. This prompted a series of meetings organized by the UNDP (which was terrified that the regime in which it had invested so much might disappear), culminating in the April 1995 Agreement on the Cooperation for the Sustainable Development of the Mekong River Basin signed by Cambodia, Laos, Thailand, and Vietnam in Chiang Rai, Thailand, creating the Mekong River Commission (MRC).

Since the dramatic confrontation of 1992, several seemingly overlapping organizations were created, including the Asian Development Bank's Greater Mekong Subregion (ADB-GMS, 1992), Japan's Forum of Comprehensive Development of Indochina (FCDI, 1993), the Quadripite Economic Cooperation (QEC, 1993), the Association of South East Asian Nations and Japan's Ministry of International Trade and Industry's Working Group on Economic Cooperation in Indochina and Burma (AEM-MITI, 1994), and (almost finalized) Myanmar and Singapore's ASEAN-Mekong Basin Development Cooperation (ASEAN-ME, 1996).

=== Mekong River Commission (1995–present) ===
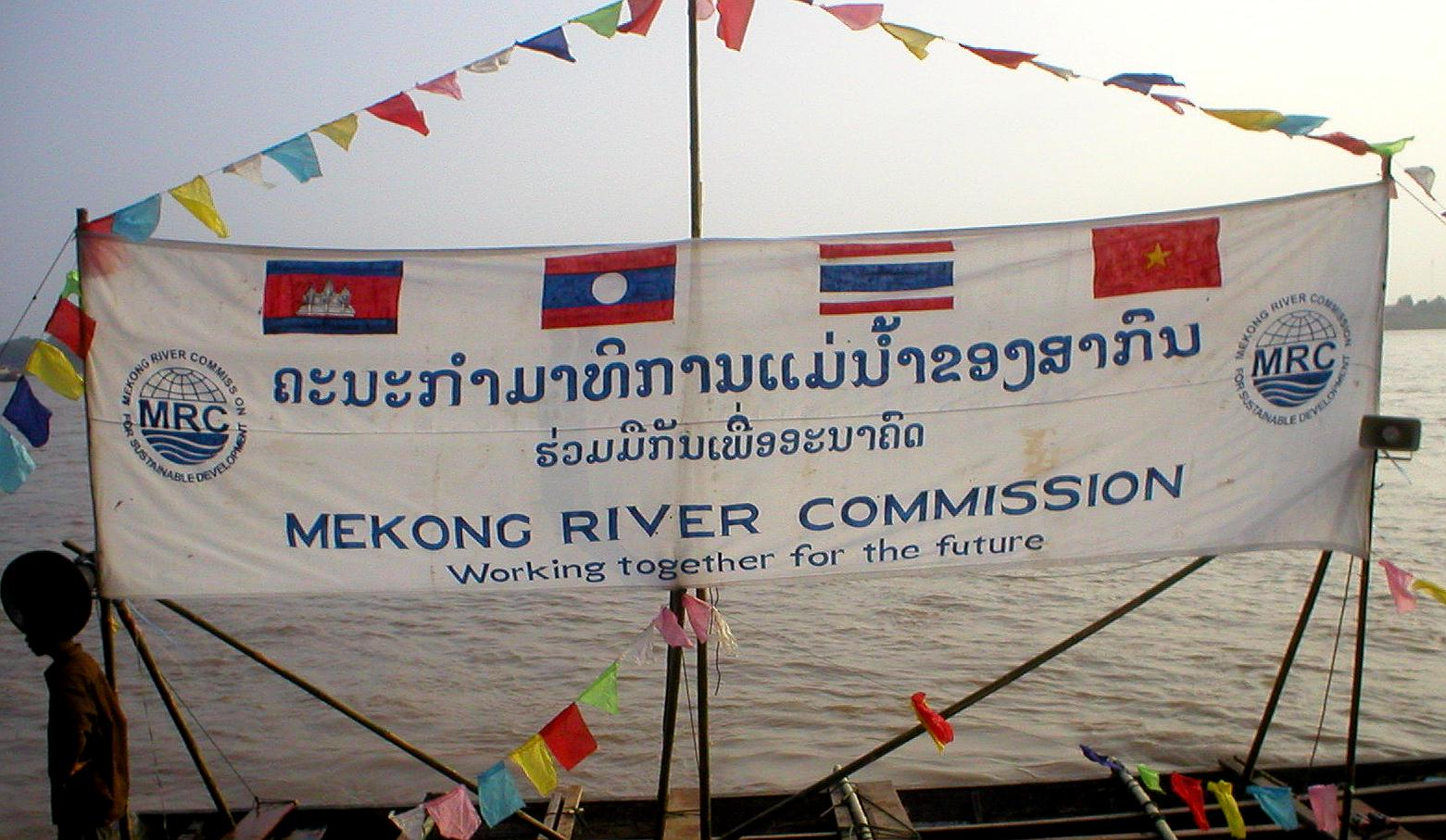

The MRC has evolved since 1995. Some of the "thorny issues" set aside during the negotiation of the agreement were at least partially resolved by the implementation of subsequent programmes such as the Water Utilization Programme (WUP) agreed to in 1999 and committed to implementation by 2005. The commission's hierarchical structure has been repeatedly tweaked, as in July 2000 when the MRC Secretariat was restructured. The 2001 Work Programme has largely come to be viewed as a shift "from a project-oriented focus to an emphasis on better management and preservation of existing resources." On paper, the Work Programme represents a rejection of the ambitious development schemes embodied by the 1970 and 1987 Indicative Basin Plans (calling for no mainstream dams) and a shift to a holistic rather than programmatic approach. In part, these changes represent a response to criticism of the MRC's failure to undertake a "regional-scale project" or even a region-level focus.

2001 also saw a major shift in the MRC—at least on paper—when it committed to a role as a "learning organization" with an emphasis on "the livelihoods of the people in the Mekong region." In the same year its annual report emphasized the importance of "bottoms-up" solutions and the "voice of the people directly affected." Similarly, the 2001 MRC Hydropower Development Strategy explicitly disavowed the "promotion of specific projects" in favor of "basin-wide issues." In part, these shifts mark a retreat from past project failures and recognition that the MRC faces multiple, and often more lucrative, competitors in the project arena.

== Governance ==
The MRC is governed by its four member countries through the Joint Committee and the council. Members of the Joint Committee are usually senior civil servants heading government departments. There is one member from each country. The Joint Committee meets two to three times a year to approve budgets and strategic plans. Members of the council are cabinet ministers. The Council meets once a year.

Technical and administrative support is provided by the MRC Secretariat. The secretariat is based in Vientiane, Laos, with over 120 staff including scientists, administrators, and technical staff. A chief executive officer manages the secretariat.

In April 2010, the Mekong River Commission convened a summit in Hua Hin, Thailand. All six riparian nations were in attendance, including China, Burma (Myanmar), Laos, Thailand, Cambodia, and Vietnam.

=== Leadership ===
From its conception until 1995 the organization was under the leadership of an "executive agent". Since then it has had CEO's.

- C. Hart Schaaf, Executive Agent, 1959 – November 1969
- Willem van der Oord, Executive Agent, December 1969 – June 1980
- Bernt Bernander, Executive Agent, July 1980 – 1983
- Galal Magdi, Executive Agent, 1983–1987
- Chuck Lankester, Executive Agent, 1988–1990
- Jan Kamp, Executive Agent, 1990–1995
- Yasunobu Matoba, CEO, 1995 – August 1999
- Jörn Kristensen, CEO, October 1999 – 2004
- Olivier Cogels, CEO, July 2004 – 2007
- Jeremy Bird, CEO, 2008–2010
- Hans Guttman, CEO, 2011
- Pham Tuan Phan, CEO 2016–2018
- An Pich Hatda, CEO, 2019–

== Relations with China and Myanmar ==
The Mekong River Commission and its predecessors have never included China (which was not a member of the United Nations in 1957) or Myanmar (which does not significantly rely on or tap the Mekong), whose territory contains the upper Basin of the Mekong. The SERVIR Mekong Project is a joint initiative by the USAID, NASA, Thailand, Cambodia, Laos, Vietnam, and Myanmar which aims to tap into the latest technologies to help the Mekong River region protect its vital ecosystem. Although China contributes only 16–18 percent of the Mekong's overall water volume, the glacial melt waters of the Tibetan plateau take on increasing importance during the dry season. The ability of upstream nations to undermine downstream cooperation was perhaps best symbolized by an April 1995 ceremonial boat trip from Thailand to Vietnam—to celebrate the signing of the 1995 Agreement—which ran aground mid-river as a result of China filling the reservoir of the Manwan Dam. Although China and Burma became "dialogue partners" of the MRC in 1996 and slowly but steadily increased their (non-binding) participation in its various forums, a 1999 World Bank workshop article described either joining the MRC in the near future as unlikely.

In April 2002, China began providing daily water level data to the MRC during the flood season. Critics noted that the emphasis on "flood control" rather than dry season flows represented an important omission given the concerns prioritized by the Mekong regime. In July 2003, MRC CEO Joern Kristensen reported that China had agreed to scale back its plans to blast rapids by implementing only phase one (of three) of its Upper Mekong Navigation Improvement Project; however, China's future intentions in this area are far from certain. One area in which China has been particularly reticent is in providing information about the operation of its dams, rather than just flow data, including refusing to join emergency meetings in 2004. Only in 2005 did China agreed to hold technical discussions directly with the MRC. On 2 June 2005, at the invitation of the Chinese Ministry of Foreign Affairs and the Ministry of Water Resources, MRC CEO Dr. Olivier Cogels and a delegation of the secretariat's senior staff made the first official visit to Beijing to hold technical consultations under the framework of cooperation between China and the MRC, within the scope of the Mekong Programme. The delegation identified a number of potential areas of cooperation with the Ministry of Foreign Affairs, the Ministry of Water Resources, and the Ministry of Communication, Information and Transport. These discussions resulted in China supplying the MRC (beginning in 2007) with 24-hour water level and 12-hour rainfall data for flood forecasts in exchange for monthly flow data from the MRC Secretariat. The incentives for China to enter into cooperative regimes on the Mekong are substantially reduced by the alternative of the Salween River as a commercial outlet for China's Yunnan province, made considerably more attractive by requiring negotiation solely with Burma, rather than with four different riparians. News media and official sources often portray China's joining the commission as a panacea for resolving the overdevelopment of the Mekong. However, there is no indication that China's joining the MRC would provide downstream riparians with any real capacity to challenge China's development plans, given the dramatic power imbalances exhibited by these countries' relations with China.

The MRC has been hesitant to fully register concerns about Chinese upstream hydro-development. For example, in a letter to the Bangkok Post, MRC CEO Dr. Olivier Cogels in fact argued that Chinese dams would increase the river's dry season volume as their purpose was electricity generation and not irrigation. While such dams certainly could increase dry season flows, the only certainty about future Chinese reservoir policies seems to be that they will be crafted outside of downstream cooperation regimes. Public statements from MRC leaders in the same vein as Cogels' comments have—to some—earned the MRC a reputation of being complicit in allowing "China's dam-building machine float downstream."

== See also ==
- SERVIR Mekong Project
- LMC (Lancang-Mekong Cooperation)

== Bibliography ==
- Backer, Ellen Bruzelius. 2007. "The Mekong River Commission: Does It Work, and How Does the Mekong Basin’s Geography Influence Its Effectiveness?" Südostasien aktuell: Journal of Current Southeast Asian Affairs, p. 31–55.
- Baker, Chris. 2007, February 24. "What is Vientiane?" Bangkok Post.
- Bakker, Karen. 1999. "The politics of hydropower: developing the Mekong." Political Geography, 18: 209–232.
- Browder, Greg (February 2000). "An Analysis of the Negotiations for the 1995 Mekong Agreement". International Negotiation. 5 (2): 237–261. doi:10.1163/15718060020848758.
- Cogels, Olivier. 2007, January 9. "Mekong hydropower development is good." Bangkok Post.
- Dore, John. 2003. "The governance of increasing Mekong regionalism." In Social Challenges for the Mekong Region. Eds. Mingsarn Koasa-ard and John Dore. Bangkok: Chiang Mai University.
- Ghosh, Nirmal. 2007, November 15. "Mekong dams 'will displace 75,000 people'; Environmental groups urge international donors to review their support for project." Straits Times.
- Hirsch, P. 2003. "The Politics of Fisheries Knowledge in the Mekong River Basin." NSW 2006 Australian Mekong Resource Center.
- Jacobs, Jeffrey W. 1995. "Mekong Committee History and Lessons for River Basin Development." The Geographical Journal, 161(2): 135–148.
- Jacobs, Jeffrey W. 1998. "The United States and the Mekong Project." Water Policy (1): 587–603.
- Japan Times. 2007, March 15. "Dark Clouds over Shangri-La."
- Kanwanich, Suprandit. 2002, October 6. "At the mercy of the Mekong." Bangkok Post.
- Kristensen, Joern. 2002. "Food Security and Development in the Lower Mekong River Basin and the Need For Regional Cooperation: A Challenge for the Mekong River Commission." Defining an Agenda for Poverty Reduction: Proceedings of the First Asia and Pacific Forum on Poverty, Volume 1. Manila: Asian Development Bank.
- Lebel, Louis, Garden, Po, and Imamura, Masao. 2005. "The Politics of Scale, Position, and Place I the Governance of Water Resources in the Mekong Region." Ecology and Society, 10(2): 18.
- Makim, Abigail. 2002. "Resources for Security and Stability? The Politics of Regional Cooperation on the Mekong, 1957–2001." Journal of Environment & Development, 11(1): 5–52.
- Mekong River Commission. 1975. Joint Declaration of Principles for Utilization of the Waters of the Mekong Basin. Bangkok: Mekong Committee.
- Mekong River Commission. 1995. Agreement on the co-operation for the sustainable development of the Mekong River Basin.
- Mekong River Commission. 2001a. Annual Report 2000. Phnom Penh: Mekong River Commission.
- Mekong River Commission. 2001b. "Mekong News: The newsletter of the Mekong River Commission, October–December 2001."
- Mekong River Commission. 2007, October 24. "Cross-border cooperation." Water Power & Dam Construction.
- Nakayama, Mikiyasu. 2002. "International Collaboration on Water Systems in Asia and the Pacific: A Case in Transition." International Review for Environmental Studies, 3(2): 274–282.
- Paul, Delia. 2003, November 17. "Rules on water use are well in place." Bangkok Post.
- Pearce, Fred. 2004, April 3. "China drains life from Mekong river." New Scientist, 182: 14.
- Pinyorat, Rungrawee C. 2003, June 13. "China vows to limit blasting of rapids." The Nation (Thailand).
- Radosevich, George E., and Olson, Douglas C. 1999. "Existing and Emerging Basin Arrangements in Asia." World Bank: Third Workshop on River Basin and Institution Development.
- Robertson, Benjamin. 2006, October 19. "Caught in the Ebb." South China Morning Post.
- Samabuddhi, Kultida. 2002, November 11. "Commission’s Middleman Role attacked." Bangkok Post.
- Sherman, Tom. 2004, May 12. "Mekong commission doesn't seem to care about people affected by its projects." The Nation (Thailand).
- Sneddon, Chris. 2002. "Water Conflicts and River Basins: The Contradictions of Comanagement and Scale in Northeast Thailand." Society and Natural Resources, 15: 725–741.
- Sneddon, Chris. 2003. "Reconfiguring scale and power: the Khong-Chi-Mun project in northeast Thailand." Environment and Planning, 35: 2229–2250.
- Sneddon, Chris, and Fox, Coleen. 2005. "Flood Pulses, International Watercourse Law, and Common Pool Resources: A Case Study of the Mekong Lowlands." Expert Group on Development Issues Research Paper No. 2005/20.
- Sneddon, Chris, and Fox, Coleen. 2006. "Rethinking transboundary waters: A critical hydropolitics of the Mekong basin." Political Geography, 25: 181–202.
- Sneddon, Chris, and Fox, Coleen. 2007a. "Power, Development, and Institutional Change: Participatory Governance in the Lower Mekong Basin." World Development, 35(12): 2161–2181.
- Sneddon, Chris, and Fox, Coleen. 2007b. "Transboundary river basin agreements in the Mekong and Zambezi basins: enhancing environmental security or securitizing the environment?" International Environmental Agreements, 7: 237–261.
- Straits Times. 2006, July 11. "When global group therapy nets a result."
- Thai News. 2007, November 19. "Southeast Asia: Activists urge MRC to halt dam projects on Mekong River."
- The Economist. 1995, November 18. "The Mekong: Dammed if you don’t." 337(7941): 38.
- The Nation (Thailand). 2004, May 10. "Senator: locals know best."
- Theeravit, Khien. 2003. "Relationships within and between the Mekong Region in the context of globalisation." In Social Challenges for the Mekong Region. Eds. Mingsarn Koasa-ard and John Dore. Bangkok: Chiang Mai University.
- Wain, Barry. 2004, August 26. "Mekong River: River at Risk—The Mekong’s Toothless Guardian." Far Eastern Economic Review.
