= William Winkelman =

American politician

Member of the Iowa Senate from the 24th district
- In office January 8, 1973 – January 9, 1977
- Preceded by: Clifton C. Lamborn
- Succeeded by: John R. Scott

Member of the Iowa House of Representatives from the 26th district
- In office January 11, 1971 – January 7, 1973
- Preceded by: Gerrit Van Roekel
- Succeeded by: Joan Miller Lipsky

Member of the Iowa House of Representatives from the 61st district
- In office January 14, 1963 – January 10, 1971
- Preceded by: Dewey Summa
- Succeeded by: Don Alt

Personal details
- Born: January 14, 1933 Lake City, Iowa
- Died: September 5, 2014 (aged 81) Des Moines, Iowa
- Party: Republican

William Winkelman (January 14, 1933 – September 5, 2014) was an American politician who served in the Iowa House of Representatives from 1963 to 1973 and in the Iowa Senate from 1973 to 1977.

He died on September 5, 2014, in Des Moines, Iowa at age 81.
