= Marcel Dyf =

French painter (1899–1985)

- Born: Marcel Dreyfus; 7 October 1899; Paris, France
- Died: 15 September 1985 (aged 85); Bois-d'Arcy, Yvelines, France
- Occupation: Painter
- Spouse: Claudine Godat

Marcel Dyf (born Marcel Dreyfus, 7 October 1899 – 15 September 1985) was a French impressionist painter.

== Biography ==
=== Early life ===
Marcel Dyf was born Marcel Dreyfus on 7 October 1899 in Paris. He grew up in Normandy, in the towns of Ault, Deauville and Trouville. He started a career as an engineer but soon decided to become a painter. In 1922, he moved to Arles, where he was trained as a painter and set up a studio.

=== Career ===
He painted frescoes in the city halls of Saint-Martin-de-Crau and Saintes-Maries-de-la-Mer. He also painted frescoes in the Museon Arlaten and in the dining hall of the Collège Ampère, both of which are in Arles. He also designed windows inside the Église Saint-Louis in Marseille.

In 1935, he moved to Maximilien Luce's old studio on the Avenue du Maine in Paris. By 1940, because of the German invasion of France during the Second World War, he returned to Arles. He quickly joined the French Resistance in Corrèze and the Dordogne. He later moved back to Paris and finally moved in Saint-Paul-de-Vence. However, in the 1950s, he started wintering in Paris and summering in Cannes, where he attracted the attention of American art collectors.

His work was exhibited and sold at the Petrides Gallery, the Salon d’Automne, the Salon des Tuileries and the Salon des Artistes Français in Paris as well as galleries in Cannes, Nice, Marseille and Strasbourg. Overseas, it was exhibited at the Frost & Reed Gallery in London.

=== Personal life ===
In 1954, he married Claudine Godat in Cannes, when she was nineteen years old. The Dyfs purchased a sixteenth-century hunting lodge in Bois-d'Arcy near Versailles, and it became their primary residence. They also summered in Saint-Rémy-de-Provence and Eygalières.

He died on 15 September 1985 in Bois-d'Arcy.
