= Harrison Memorial Library =

Library in California

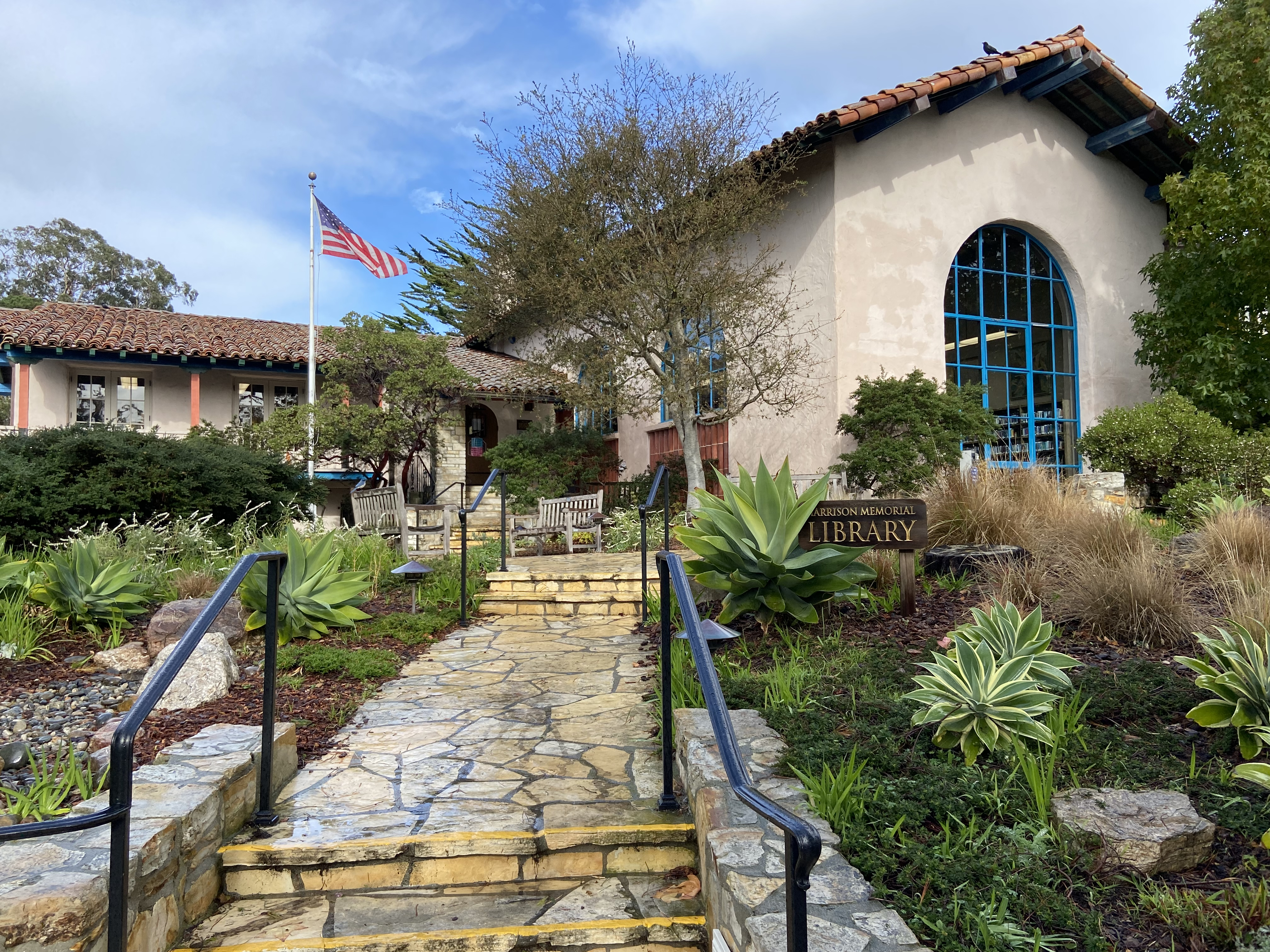
- Harrison Memorial Library, Carmel
- 36°33′19″N 121°55′24″W
- Location: Ocean Avenue, Carmel-by-the-Sea, California, US, U.S. state
- Type: Public library
- Established: March 31, 1928; 98 years ago
- Architect: C. J. Ryland
- Service area: Monterey County, California

Other information
- Website: Official website

The Harrison Memorial Library is a historic building designed by architect Bernard Maybeck and built by Michael J. Murphy in 1928. It houses a public library for the city of Carmel-by-the-Sea, California. The library provides books, materials and programs that support the pursuit of education, information, recreation, and culture. It includes documents about the history and development of Carmel and the Monterey Peninsula. The Harrison Memorial Library was named after California Supreme Court Justice Ralph C. Harrison.

== History ==
On September 27, 1918, Ella Reid Harrison, announced her plan to donate the land and $20,000 (equivalent to $428,097 in 2025) in bonds to the city to build a library in honor of her late husband. On October 12, 1922, after Ella Reid Harrison's death, her estate financed a memorial to her husband, California Supreme Court Justice Ralph Chandler Harrison (1833–1918), to establish a new public library. Her estate included rare books, furniture, and a number of valuable art pieces for the library (over 2,000 items). The new library was designed by California architect Bernard Maybeck in a Spanish Eclectic style and built by Michael J. Murphy, at a cost of $27,373 (equivalent to $377,603 in 2025).

The library opened on March 31, 1928, in a two-story building in Carmel-by-the-Sea. It was renovated in 1949 and again in 1977. Christine Delsol of SFGate described it as an "imposing Mission-style building with castle-sized windows."

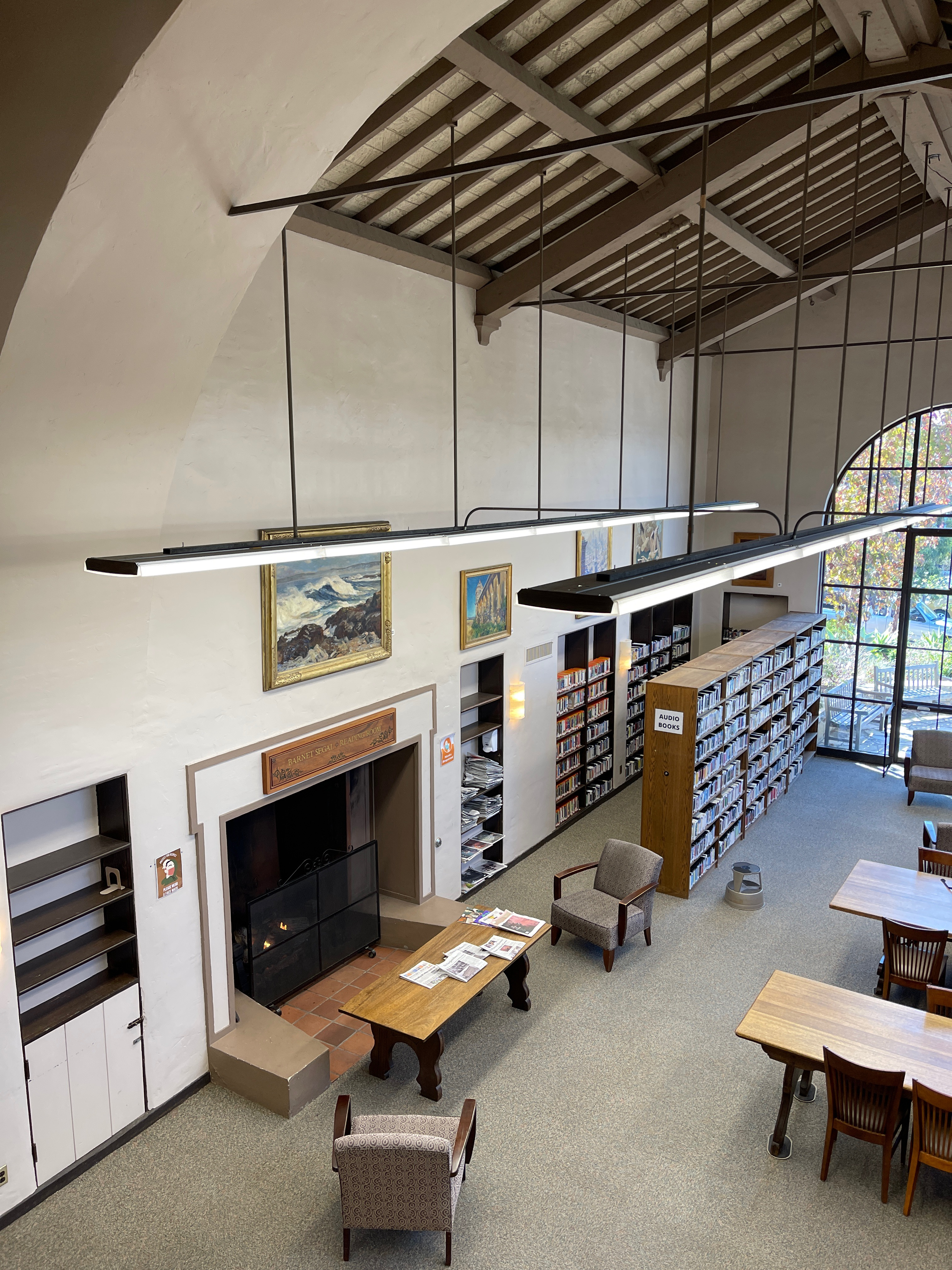
The Barnet J. Segal Reading Room

The Barnet Segal Reading Room is named for Barnet J. Segal.

In 2026, plans were announced for a restoration and modernization project addressing electrical, plumbing, technology, and accessibility upgrades to the historic building.

== See also ==
- Carmel-by-the-Sea, California
