= Bob Barnwell =

American football and basketball coach

- Barnwell pictured in Sequel 1945, Western Illinois yearbook

Biographical details
- Born: January 1, 1916; Springfield, Missouri, U.S.
- Died: September 19, 1985 (aged 69); Port Richey, Florida, U.S.

Coaching career (HC unless noted)

Football
- 1944: Western Illinois

Basketball
- 1943–1946: Western Illinois

Head coaching record
- Overall: 0–8 (football); 24–22 (basketball)

Robert Wade Barnwell (January 1, 1916 – September 19, 1985) was an American football and basketball coach. He served as the head football coach at Western Illinois University in Macomb, Illinois for one season, in 1944 season, compiling a record of 0–8. Barnwell was also the head basketball coach at Western Illinois from 1943 to 1946, tallying a mark of 24–22. Barnwell attended Missouri State University and Columbia University Teachers' College prior to coming to Western Illinois.

Barnwell died in 1985.

== Head coaching record ==
=== Football ===
Year	Team	Overall	Conference	Standing	Bowl/playoffs
Western Illinois Leathernecks (Illinois Intercollegiate Athletic Conference) (1944)
1944	Western Illinois	0–8	0–4	5th	
Western Illinois:		0–8	0–4		
Total:		0–8			
