= Church of St Louis, Marseille =

Coordinates: 43.3484°N 5.3580°E

- Église Saint-Louis de Marseille
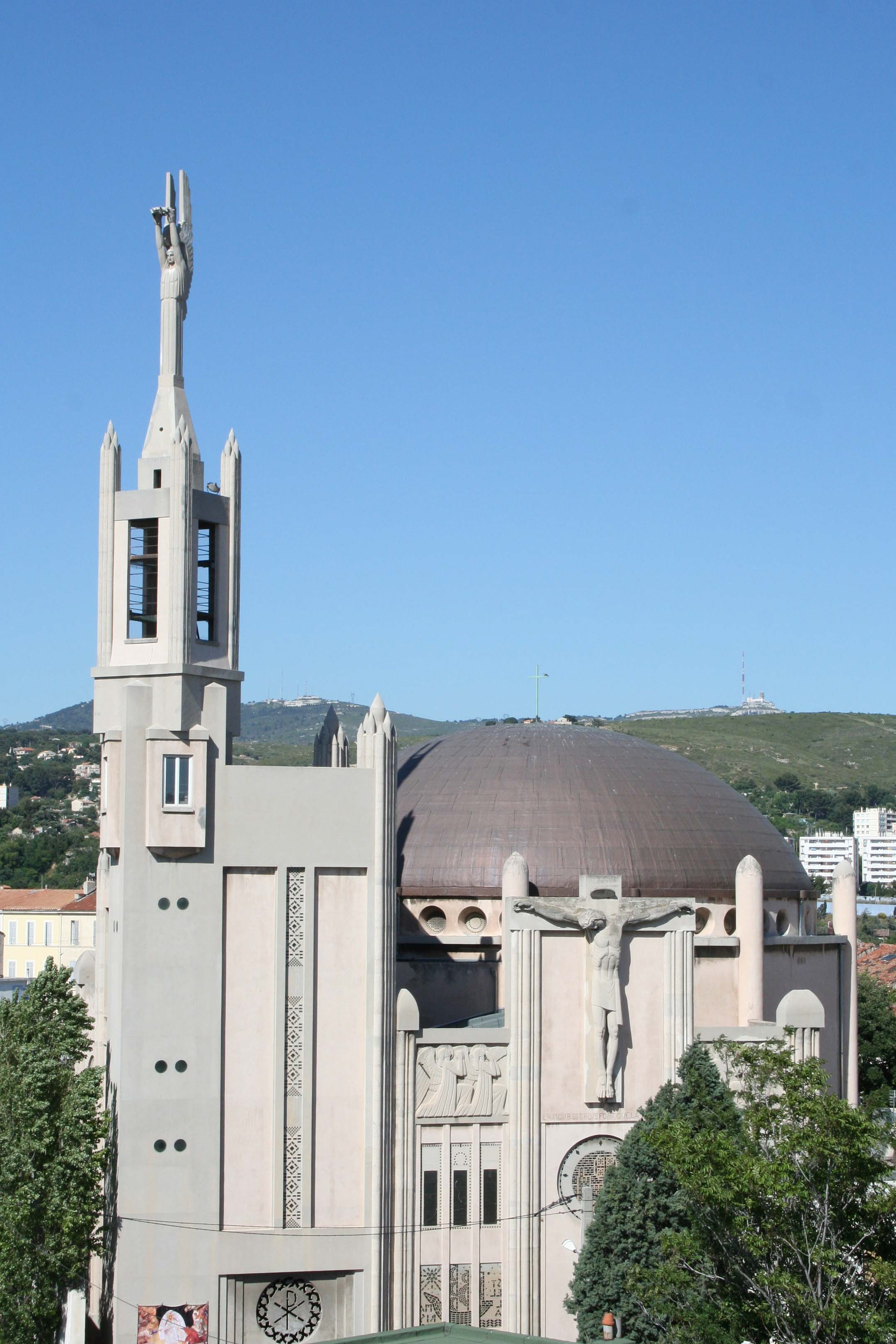
- Church of St Louis, Marseille
- Location: 22 avenue du Rove; Marseille 13001; Bouches-du-Rhône, Provence-Alpes-Côte d'Azur
- Country: France
- Denomination: Roman Catholic

History
- Dedicated: 1935

Architecture
- Heritage designation: Monument historique
- Designated: December 14, 1989
- Architect: Jean-Louis Sourdeau
- Architectural type: Bauhaus

Administration
- Diocese: Roman Catholic Archdiocese of Marseille

The Church of St Louis (French: Église Saint-Louis) is a historic Roman Catholic church in the 15th arrondissement of Marseille, France. It was designed in the Bauhaus architectural style by Jean-Louis Sourdeau, with additional sculptures designed by Carlo Sarrabezolles. Its construction was completed in 1935. It has been listed as an official historical monument since December 14, 1989.
