= Sam Reese =

American film and television actor

- Reese in King Rat, 1965
- Born: Sammy Pharr Reese; September 11, 1930; Montgomery, Alabama, U.S.
- Died: September 11, 1985 (aged 55); September 12, 1985 (aged 55) (sources differ); Montgomery, Alabama, U.S.
- Occupations: Film and television actor
- Years active: 1959–1970

Sammy Pharr Reese (September 11, 1930 – September 11, 1985 or September 12, 1985 (sources differ) ) was an American film and television actor. He was known for playing the recurring role of Dr. Dan Shanks in the first season of the American medical drama television series Dr. Kildare, and was also known as the clerk in the 1967 film In the Heat of the Night, starring Sidney Poitier, Rod Steiger, Warren Oates and Lee Grant.

Reese was born in Montgomery, Alabama, the son of Mary Reese. He guest-starred in television programs, including The Andy Griffith Show, Gunsmoke, I Spy, The Big Valley, Iron Horse, Death Valley Days, That Girl and The Alfred Hitchcock Hour, and played the recurring role of Dr. Dan Shanks in the first season of the NBC medical drama television series Dr. Kildare. He also appeared in films such as King Rat (as Kurt), Captain Newman, M.D. and PT 109.

Reese died on September 11, 1985 or September 12, 1985, in Montgomery, Alabama, at the age of 55.
