= Carlo de Ferrariis Salzano =

Italian diplomat

Carlo de Ferrariis Salzano (August 20, 1905, Naples, Italy – September 30, 1985, Rome, Italy) was an Italian diplomat, secretary general of the Ministry of Foreign Affairs from 1958 to 1959.

== Biography ==
=== Education and early career ===
Carlo de Ferrariis Salzano was born in Naples on August 20, 1905, to a noble family. He graduated in law from the University of Naples in October 1927. Later, in July 1931, he obtained a degree in political science from the University of Perugia.

After passing the competitive examination, he is appointed a Volunteer in the diplomatic career on January 16, 1932, serving in the Ministry of Foreign Affairs. He was posted to Geneva on October 28, 1932, and appointed vice consul 2nd class on April 4, 1933. Transferred to Cannes on November 24, 1933, he is appointed vice consul 1st class on December 31, 1935. His career continued in Paris, where he was transferred with the role of Fourth Secretary on February 17, 1936, and later confirmed with the role of Third Secretary on July 7, 1936. He returned to the Ministry of Foreign Affairs on February 17, 1938.

=== World War II ===
On June 15, 1940, he was put on leave for military mobilization. He participated in military operations in Albania, earning a War Merit Cross and a commemorative medal. After the end of military leave on August 5, 1940, he was appointed First Secretary of Legation of the 2nd class on February 15, 1942, and assigned to Budapest on March 17, 1942. With the establishment of the Italian Social Republic, his head of mission Filippo Anfuso sided with Mussolini, while de Ferrariis and other officials remained loyal to the king and the Badoglio government and were expelled from the embassy. The Neapolitan diplomat then reconstituted the embassy of the Kingdom of Italy elsewhere, assuming the regency on September 28, 1943. In March 1944 he was arrested by Nazi occupation forces, interned and then transferred to the Lumezzane camp near Brescia, along with loyalist officials from other Italian diplomatic representations who had fallen into German hands. Sentenced to forced residence at a religious institute in Cesano Boscone, in October 1944, de Ferrariis took advantage of his semi-freedom to reach Bologna, where he hid for another three months, along with two other officials from Budapest, Giorgio Ciraolo and Attilio Perrone Capano. Finally, together with his two colleagues, he attempted the crossing of the Apennines and, in the early days of 1945, managed to cross the lines with the help of partisans.

=== After the War and Career Development ===
Upon regaining freedom, he resumed service at the Ministry of Foreign Affairs as Head of Office X in the Directorate General of Political Affairs on May 30, 1945, and as Head of Office VI in the Directorate General of Political Affairs on October 1, 1945. He was transferred to Mexico on October 7, 1946, as the First Secretary of the 1st class, and later to Brussels with the role of Counselor on November 5, 1949. He was then appointed Consul General in Chicago on December 2, 1951. He became Counselor of Legation on December 29, 1951. On October 5, 1952, he was appointed Consul General in New York. On November 3, 1954, he was appointed Extraordinary Envoy and Minister Plenipotentiary of the 2nd class. Returning to the Ministry, he became Director General of Personnel on July 28, 1958. He held the positions of Full Member of the Permanent Commission responsible for examining the financing of Representations abroad and President of the board of directors for auxiliary personnel. On November 8, 1959, he was appointed Extraordinary Envoy and Minister Plenipotentiary of the 1st class. On November 10, 1958, he was appointed Secretary-General of the Ministry of Foreign Affairs. He participated as a member of the Italian delegation in the 25th session of the Atlantic Council in Paris in December 1958 and the 26th session in Washington in April 1959. On July 12, 1959, he was appointed ambassador to Ottawa. From October 3, 1967, to January 15, 1971, he served as Italy's permanent representative to NATO.

He retired on September 1, 1970.

One of his early personal notes (1933) stated: "Excellent official, but with the unpleasant tendency to bypass superiors."

== Awards ==
- May 15, 1968: Knight of Grand Cross of the Order of Merit of the Italian Republic
- 1942: Cross of the Order of Isabella the Catholic
- Knight Fourth Class of the Order of the Rising Sun
- 1939: War Merit Cross

== Bibliography ==
- Vaccari, Ilva (1967). Un diplomatico fedele all'Italia: Attilio Perrone Capano (in Italian). Istituto storico del Resistenza.

== See also ==
- Ministry of Foreign Affairs (Italy)
