= Tom Fena =

American football player (1909–1985)

Profile
- Positions: Guard, tackle

Personal information
- Born: December 27, 1909; Cleveland
- Died: September 7, 1985 (aged 75); Burlingame, California
- Listed height: 5 ft 11 in (1.80 m)
- Listed weight: 200 lb (91 kg)

Career information
- High school: Burlingame (CA)
- College: Denver

Career history
- Detroit Lions (1937)

Career statistics
- Games: 2
- Stats at Pro Football Reference

Thomas Mitchell Fena (December 27, 1909 – September 7, 1985) was an American football player.

Fena was born in Cleveland in 1909. He attended Burlingame High School in Burlingame, California. He was the star fullback on Burlingame's football team.

His older brother Joe Fena went to the University of Denver where he played football. Tom followed his brother to Denver and played at the tackle position. He won a reputation as a sensational kicker and one of the hardest hitting tackles in the Rocky Mountain Conference. He was selected as a first-team tackle on the All-Rocky Mountain Conference football team. He also received honorable mention from the United Press on the 1934 All-America college football team.

He also played professional football in the National Football League (NFL) as a guard for the Detroit Lions. He appeared in two NFL games, during the 1937 season.

Fena died in 1985 in Burlingame, California.
