= Elizabeth Sadoques Mason =

Indian-American nurse

Elizabeth Mary Sadoques Mason
- Born: May 16, 1897
- Died: September 24, 1985 (aged 88); Keene, New Hampshire, U.S.
- Occupation: Registered Nurse
- Parent(s): Israel Sadoques; Mary Watso

Elizabeth Mary Sadoques Mason (May 16, 1897 – September 24, 1985) was one of the first Native American Registered Nurses known in United States. Though not much is known about her career, Elizabeth finished nursing school in New York in 1919 and worked as a nurse to artist Abbot Handerson Thayer. She spent her nursing career between Elliot Community Hospital in Keene, NH and private-duty nursing in her community, even going to Bermuda for one patient.

== Background ==
Elizabeth was the youngest child born to the family of Israel Sadoques and Mary Watso, Abenaki Indians. Originally from Odanak Reserve, in Quebec, Canada, the family migrated to Keene, New Hampshire in 1880, where they operated a basketmaking and tannery business. Elizabeth had 5 sisters, Mary, Ida, Margaret, Agnes, and Maude. Margaret owned and operated a millinery shop in Keene until 1961. Maude became a registered nurse prior to her sister and was also an Episcopalian nun, taking the name of Sister Benedicta. She is believed to have been the first Native American to become a nun in the Episcopalian church. Elizabeth also had 2 brothers, Israel and Edward. She married Claude Mason and had 2 children, daughters Claudia Mason Chicklas and Mary (Molly/Mali) Mason Holland Keating.

Although the Sadoques family in Keene was fully Native American, there is an oral history of English descent in the family through Eunice Williams, a Euro-American captive taken in the Deerfield, Massachusetts raid of 1704.
