= Maud Johnson =

American journalist

Maud Battle Johnson (c. 1918 – September 5, 1985) was a US journalist and author of romance novels. Johnson began her writing career working for newspapers in North Carolina, eventually becoming managing editor of the Rocky Mount Evening Telegram. Her novels for teen-aged girls included a romance series set in Virginia — where Johnson later died of cancer. The novels, beginning in 1979 with I'm Christy and continuing through Christy's Choice, Christy's Love, and Christy's Senior Year, were best sellers but were critically panned as "corny" and "bland." Johnson died in Richmond, Virginia, but was buried in Pineview Cemetery in Rocky Mount; her final novel, Dating Blues, was published after her death.

== Notes ==
=== Sources ===
- "Maud Battle Johnson" (obituary), Washington Post, September 9, 1985.
