= Tibor Czorba =

Hungarian painter

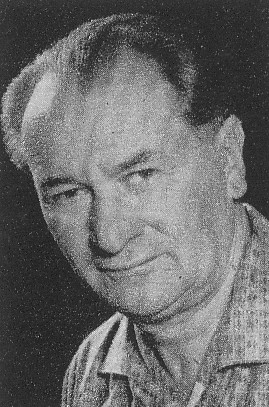
Tibor Csorba in 1960s

Tibor Czorba (1906 in Szepesváralja – 5 September 1985, in Warsaw) was a Hungarian artist.

In 1929 he completed art school in Budapest and in 1938 at PIRR in Warsaw, Poland. In 1944 he earned a doctorate in philosophy at the University of Budapest.

Czorba traveled a lot through France, Belgium, the United Kingdom, Bulgaria, and the former Czechoslovakia. He published many works in the field of history and literature in the form of textbooks and dictionaries. His art is found at the Gallery of Modern Art in Kraków, Poland, as well as Washington, D.C., New York City, and many other Hungarian galleries.
