= SERVIR Mekong Project =

- Abbreviation: SERVIR-Mekong Project
- Formation: 2015; 11 years ago
- Legal status: Active
- Region served: Southeast Asia
- Members: Myanmar, Cambodia, Laos, Thailand, Vietnam
- Website: servir.adpc.net/about

SERVIR-Mekong project is a joint initiative by the US agency for International Development (USAID), NASA and five other countries which are Myanmar, Thailand, Cambodia, Laos and Vietnam. "Servir" is a Spanish word which means "to serve". The project aims to use the latest technologies to help the Mekong river region protect its vital ecosystem. It helps to connect USAID's development network with NASA's technology and satellite data to provide mapping information and satellite imagery.

== History ==
The first such experimental hub was launched in Panama in 2005 to serve the near region. The project was initially undertaken by researchers at NASA's Marshall Space Flight Center in Alabama. In the Earth Observation Summit, 2007, SERVIR was recognized as a model for the effectuation of the Global Earth Observation System of Systems (GEOSS). In 2010, the organisation had a presence in the Himalayas when a hub, SERVIR-Himalaya, was established at the International Centre for Integrated Mountain Development (ICIMOD) in Kathmandu, Nepal. The organization has launched similar projects in the past for other regions in Latin America, Africa and Asia.

== Target ==
The project stresses the vital issues associated in the Mekong river basin region which encompasses all the five countries which are also known as the rice bowl of Asia. The project will also allow these countries to better deal with natural disasters and climate studies like green house gas emissions and its effects. It also enables them to use their water resources more efficiently.

== Geographical and strategical importance ==
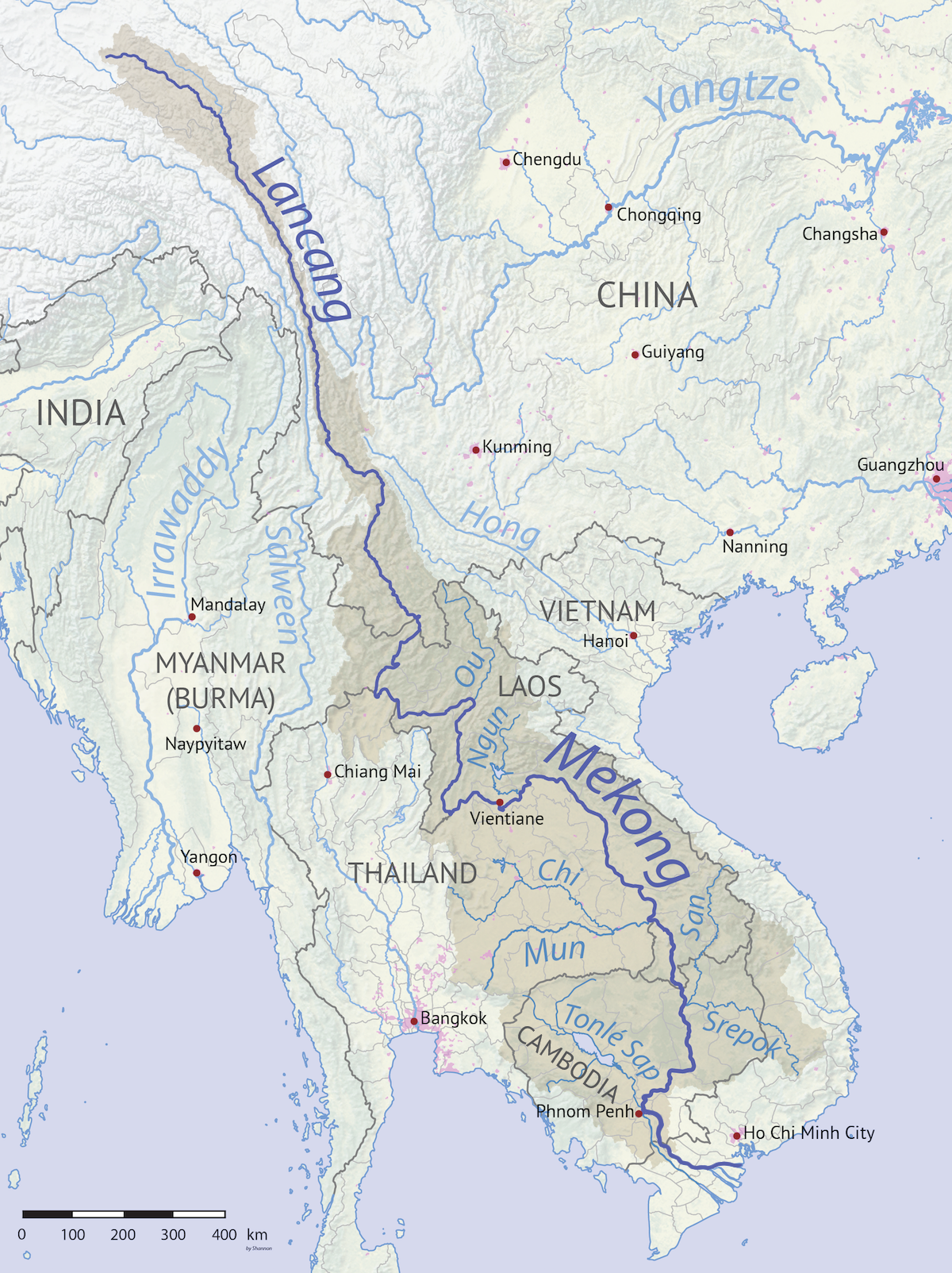
Mekong River Basin Area is about 5000km long

The Mekong basin covers almost 5,000 kilometres (3,100 mi) from Tibetan plateau up to the South China Sea region. It gives livelihood to almost 40 million people. The environment is considered one of the most volatile ones in the world. The project uses space applications and helps to create geospatial data which is later analyzed to avoid natural disasters like floods and others in the lower Mekong region.

== Implementation ==
The implementation of the project is undertaken by the Asian Disaster Preparedness Center (ADPC) in consortium with Stockholm Environment Institute (SEI), Spatial Informatics Group (SIG) and Deltares. The first phase of the project was launched on 31 August 2015.

== Future perspectives ==
SERVIR-Mekong is an example of the technical collaboration in the region and development of a common analysis. It also aims to see environmental planning agencies leading in technical support and take better development decisions. SERVIR has also served in development of more than 30 countries of Latin America, Africa and Asia which includes providing tools and training to thousands of people of the region.
