= Petter Ravn =

Norwegian footballer (1908-1985)

Personal information
- Date of birth: 4 October 1908
- Date of death: 17 September 1985 (aged 76)

International career
Years	Team	Apps	(Gls)
1931	Norway	1	(0)

Petter Ravn (4 October 1908 – 17 September 1985) was a Norwegian footballer. He played in one match for the Norway national football team in 1931.
