= Ernie Collihole =

Australian rules footballer

Personal information
- Full name: Ernest James Collihole
- Born: 26 December 1930
- Died: 14 September 1985 (aged 54)
- Height: 175 cm (5 ft 9 in)
- Weight: 73 kg (161 lb)

Playing career^{1}
| Years | Club | Games (Goals) |
| 1950–51 | South Melbourne | 17 (0) |
- ^{1} Playing statistics correct to the end of 1951.

Ernest James Collihole (26 December 1930 – 14 September 1985) was an Australian rules footballer who played with South Melbourne in the Victorian Football League (VFL).
