= Ivy Parker =

American chemist and engineer

Ivy May Parker
- Born: September 11, 1907; Quay County, New Mexico United States
- Died: September 7, 1985 (aged 77); Potter County, Texas, United States
- Resting place: Tucumcari Memorial Park, New Mexico, United States
- Education: West Texas State Teachers College; University of Texas
- Known for: Post-World War II pipeline technology
- Scientific career
- Fields: Chemistry; Engineering

Ivy May Parker (September 11, 1907 – September 7, 1985) was an American chemist and engineer. She earned a doctorate in organic chemistry in 1935 and worked in the oil industry as a specialist on the causes and prevention of corrosion of pipelines.

== Early life and education ==
Born on September 11, 1907, in Quay County, New Mexico, Parker was educated at West Texas State Teachers College, where she won the Garvan Essay prize of $500 in her sophomore year. She went on to attain her master's degree and PhD in organic chemistry from the University of Texas in 1931 and 1935 respectively, becoming the first woman to receive a PhD in chemistry at the university.

== Career ==
Following her work as an assistant professor of chemistry at the University of Mary Hardin–Baylor from 1934 to 1935, Parker was employed by Shell Oil Company as an analytical chemist from 1936 to 1943, and held the position of senior research chemist for the J.S. Abercrombie Company for one year. In 1945 she began a 27-year career at the Plantation Pipeline Company as a field technologist, research engineer, and senior engineer.

Parker used her knowledge of chemistry to contribute to the development of pipeline technology as it evolved and expanded post-World War II. She published numerous papers on the issue of pipeline corrosion, and made innovations in both water- and oil-soluble inhibitors.

In 1944 the National Association of Corrosion Engineers (NACE) appointed her as the first editor of their official publication, Corrosion, a position she occupied until 1965. She was a specialist in research on the cause and prevention of corrosion of pipeline technology.

She was a member of the American Association for the Advancement of Science, the American Chemical Society, the Electrochemical Society, and a fellow of the American Institute of Chemists.

== Legacy ==
An Ivy Parker Memorial Scholarship was established by the Society of Women Engineers for female engineering students.
