= Geneviève Tabouis =

French historian and journalist

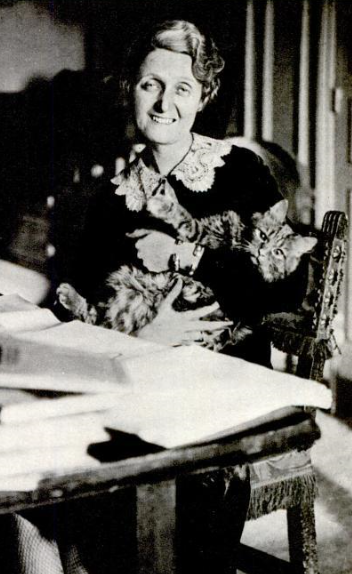
Geneviève Tabouis in 1938

Geneviève Tabouis (23 September 1892 – 22 September 1985) was a French historian and journalist.

== Biography ==
Tabouis was born in Paris in 1892, the daughter of Fernand Le Quesne (born 1856), a noted French painter. She was first educated at the Convent of the Assumption, a fashionable Parisian convent. When she was 13 years old, the 1905 French law on the Separation of the Churches and the State was passed. In her 1942 autobiography, she wrote that a few years later, the nuns were forbidden to teach students. She left the convent school and went to public high school, where she specialized in archeology and Egyptology. She studied at the Faculté des Lettres in Paris and the School of Archeology at the Louvre. She wrote three popular books on the lives of Tutankhamen (1929), Nebuchadnezzar (1931), and Solomon (1936).

Tabouis' family included French diplomats Jules Cambon (her uncle) and his brother Paul Cambon. Other relatives were senior diplomats and officials in the French military. Her autobiography does not mention her husband, Robert Tabouis, and refers only in passing to her son, who was called up into the French army in 1938, and to her daughter. She also mentions Arthur, her household servant. Tabouis moved in the highest social circles in France and England. She was invited to the coronation of King George VI and Queen Elizabeth in 1936, referring in her autobiography to her coronation robe made by Edward Molyneux and to having her hair coiffured by one of the most popular hairdressers in London.

== Career ==
In 1903, she spent several months at the French embassy in Madrid with her uncle, Paul Cambon. In 1906, she and her cousin saw the wedding of Alfonso XIII of Spain and Princess Victoria Eugenie of Battenberg. From 1907 to 1914, she visited Berlin for a month or two each year to visit her uncle Jules Cambon, the French Ambassador to Berlin, meeting various German dignitaries. After World War I, she attended several sessions of the League of Nations with her uncle Jules.

In 1924, she began writing articles about the League of Nations for the Le Petit Marseillais and La Petite Gironde, two large provincial newspapers. Her editor at Le Petit Marseillais told her to sign her names as "G. Tabouis" to hide her gender; La Petite Gironde told her to use only her initials. As their correspondent, she attended the signing of the Locarno Treaties in 1925.

In 1932, following the death of Aristide Briand, Tabouis began writing a daily column for the Paris newspaper L'œuvre in addition to reporting for La Petite Gironde and Le Petit Marseillais. In 1933, she accompanied French Prime Minister Édouard Herriot who travelled to Moscow in an effort to forge a Soviet-French alliance against Germany.

Tabouis repeatedly warned about Hitler's rise and German re-armament. For her troubles, the French writer Léon Daudet nicknamed her "Madam Tata, the Clairvoyant" in 1933. After Germany announced that it was re-introducing compulsory military conscription and rebuilding its armed forces in March 1935, the Greek diplomat Nikolaos Politis warned her "You better watch out, Madame Tabouis, or they'll begin to call you Cassandra. You predict dire events, and, the worst of it is, they always happen." Hitler himself attacked her writing in a 1 May 1939, speech where he sarcastically said "As for Madame Tabouis, that wisest of women, she knows what I am about to do even before I know it myself. She is ridiculous."

When Tabouis vigorously campaigned for French support for Republican Spain against Franco, La Petite Gironde (which was supported by Spanish businessman and Franco ally Juan March) dropped her as a correspondent in 1935. Le Petit Marseillais (whose director was married to a Spanish Fascist) asked her to "modify" her tone—she left that paper as well.

Tabouis became the foreign editor of L'œuvre in 1936, where her pro-Republican stance lead to attacks by the Parisian weeklies Candide and Gringoire as well as Action Française. She strongly supported intervention to prevent the German occupation of Czechoslovakia, but the French chose not to intervene. Tabouis was accused of being a warmonger. On the eve of World War II, she was a regular correspondent for London's Sunday Referee in addition to her role at L'œuvre.

Tabouis fled France just before its surrender to Germany in 1940, having been warned that an arrest warrant was soon to be issued for her. She was forced to leave her husband, son, and daughter behind. She travelled to England and then to America. In New York, she wrote for New York's Daily Mirror and for London's Sunday Dispatch and edited the French-language Pour la victoire.

After the war, she returned to Paris where she wrote for: Free France (1945–1949), Information (1949–1956) and Paris-Jour (from 1959). From 1957 to 1981, she had a radio program on Radio Luxembourg.

== Personal life ==
In 1938, Life magazine reported that Tabouis was a non-smoker, teetotaller and vegetarian, and in a surgical operation had to have a kidney removed.

== Selected publications ==
- Geneviève Tabouis: Le Pharaon Tout Ank Amon, sa vie et son temps (1928)
- Geneviève Tabouis: The Private Life of Tutankhamen; Love, Religion, and Politics at the Court of an Egyptian King (1929)
- Geneviève Tabouis: Nebuchadnezzar (1931)
- Geneviève Tabouis: Private Life of Solomon (1936)
- Geneviève Tabouis: Life of Jules Cambon (1938)
- Geneviève Tabouis: Blackmail or War (1938)
- Geneviève Tabouis: Perfidious Albion - Entente Cordiale (1938)
- Geneviève Tabouis: They Called Me Cassandra (1942)
- Geneviève Tabouis: Grandeurs et servitudes américaines: souvenirs des U. S. A., 1940-1945 (1945)
- Geneviève Tabouis: Vingt ans de "suspense" diplomatique (1958)
