= Willem van der Oord =

Dutch hydraulic engineer (1919–1985)

Willem Johan van der Oord (27 September 1919 – 5 September 1985) was a Dutch hydraulic engineer. He was involved in setting up the Mekong Committee and served as its Executive agent from December 1969 until June 1980. He also worked for the United Nations Economic and Social Commission for Asia and the Pacific.

Van der Oord was born in Haarlemmermeer in September 1919. He was elected a correspondent of the Royal Netherlands Academy of Arts and Sciences in 1969. He died in September 1985 at the age of 65.
