= Jim McGlone =

Australian rules footballer

Personal information
- Full name: James Henry McGlone
- Born: 12 February 1897; Lilydale, Tasmania
- Died: 5 September 1985 (aged 88); Cohuna, Victoria
- Original team: Penguin

Playing career^{1}
Years	Club	Games (Goals)
1926	Footscray	6 (3)
- ^{1} Playing statistics correct to the end of 1926.

James Henry McGlone (12 February 1897 – 5 September 1985) was an Australian rules footballer who played with Footscray in the Victorian Football League (VFL).
