= Joanna Wichmann =

German-born textile artist (1905-1985)

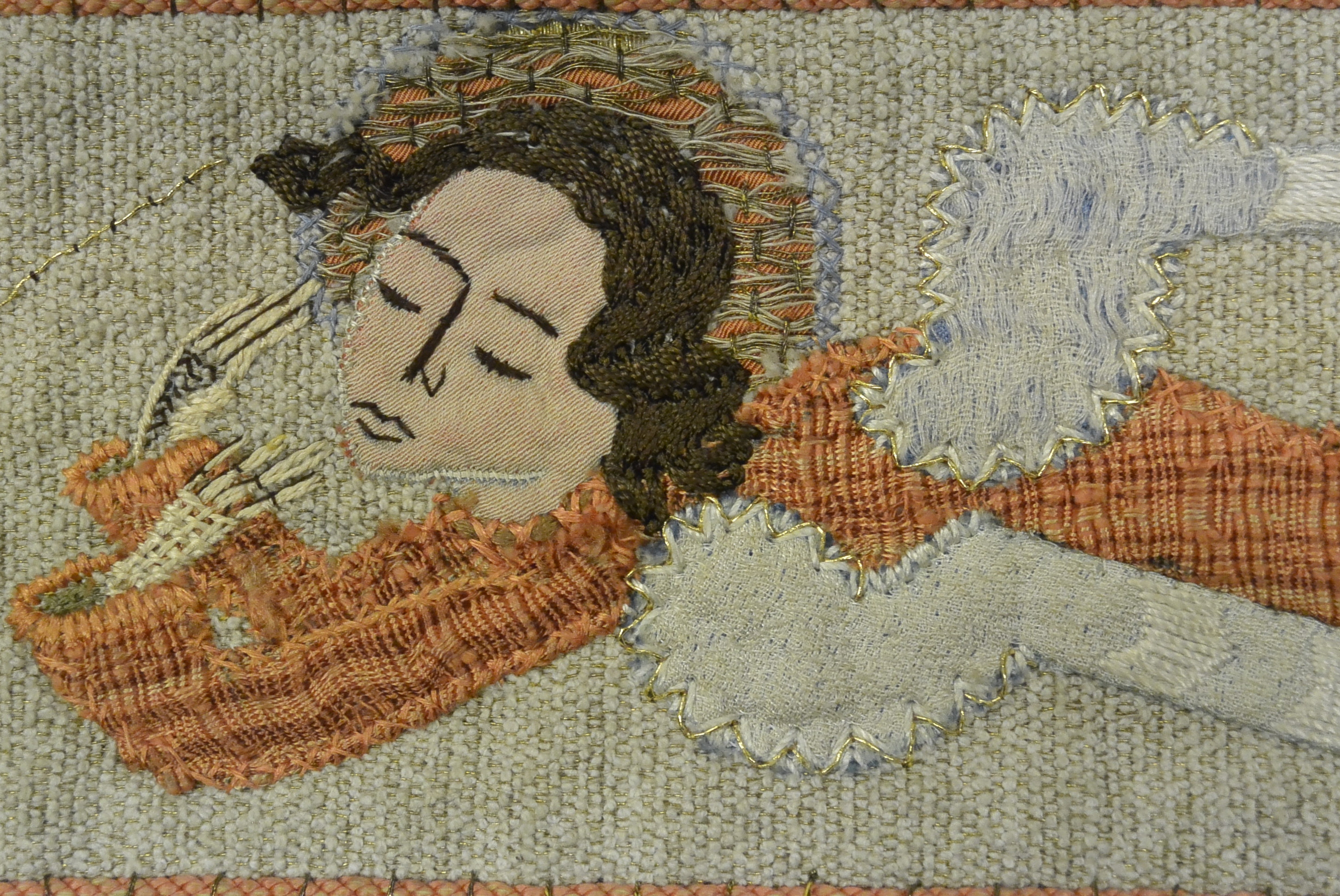
- Detail of angel on a chasuble embroidered by Wichmann
- Born: Johanna Pittig; 5 January 1905; Essen, Germany
- Died: 27 September 1985 (aged 80); Bonn, Germany
- Other name: Anna Wichmann
- Occupation: Textile artist
- Known for: Religious tapestries and garments
- Spouse: W. Bierther

Joanna (Anna) Wichmann (5 January 1905 – 27 September 1985) was a German-born textile artist and embroiderer who worked in the Netherlands from 1928 to 1939.

== Biography ==
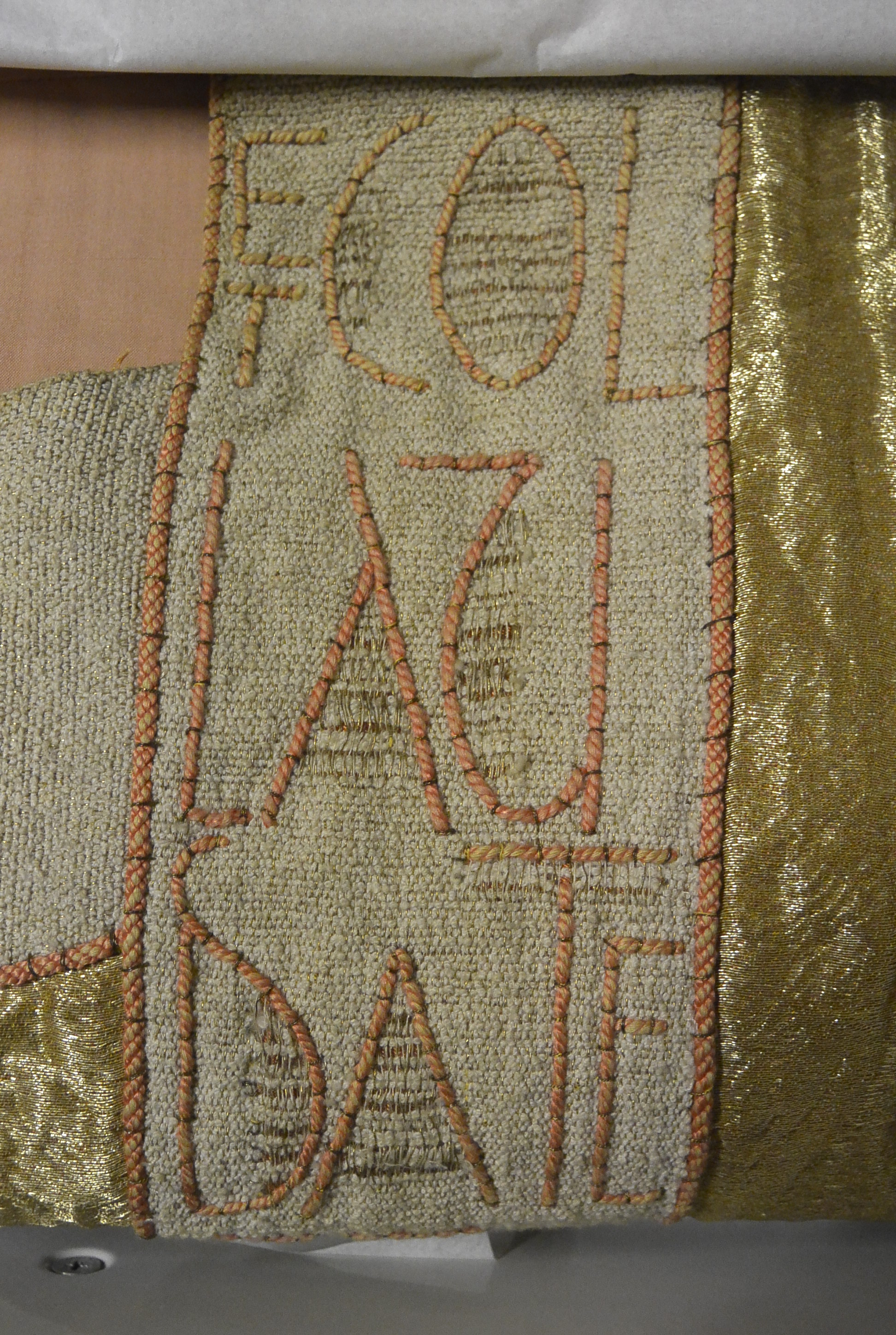
Detailed embroidery by Wichmann

She was born Johanna Pittig in Essen, Germany, on 5 January 1905, as the daughter of Joseph Pittig and Petronella Theodora Sanders. She was adopted by Heinrich Wichmann and Katharina Vogt and assumed the name Joanna Wichmann.

She studied at the Folkwang School in Essen until 1927, where she was taught by Karl Kriete and Jos van Heekern, among others. She then worked for two years with the painter Martin Monnickendam in Amsterdam, Holland. In 1928, an exhibition was dedicated to her embroidery work for the first time, in the St. Bernard House in Amsterdam. The quantity of her creative work was limited because she had to not only design each piece but make it as well. She worked there until 1931 and then moved on to the Institute for Ecclesiastical Art at St. Boniface House, also in Amsterdam.

At the Institute, Wichmann was put in charge of the workshop for liturgical chasubles, vestments and banners and she remained there until the Institute was closed down in 1938 because of declining commissions.

=== Work ===
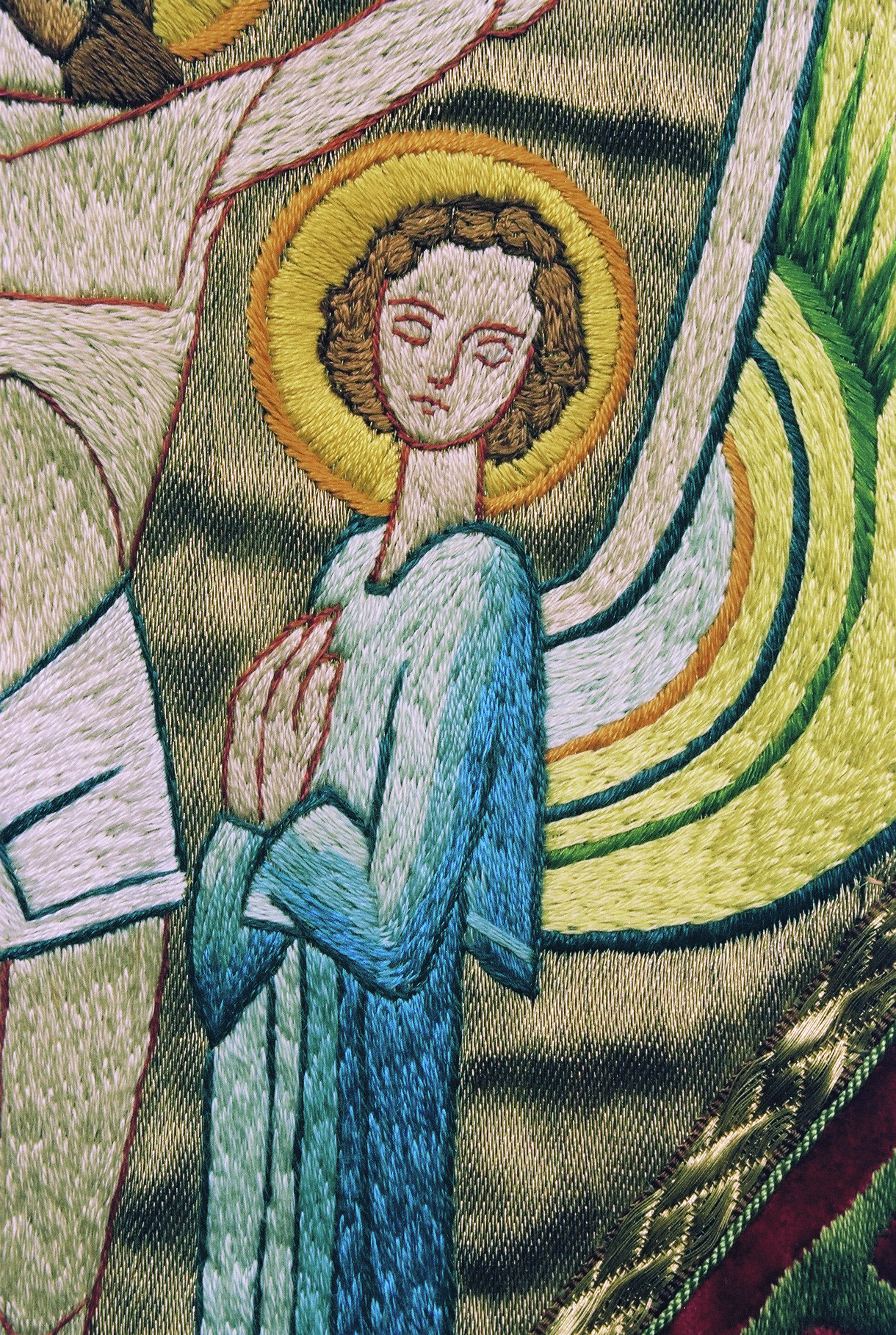
Embroidery detail by Joanna Wichmann

Wichmann mainly designed and manufactured church vestments, banners and tapestries. The fabrics she used were flexible and single-colored. In addition to undecorated fabrics, she used modern silk damasks, from Johan Thorn Prikker, among others, and hand-woven fabrics from Greten Neter-Kähler. The latter was trained at the Bauhaus and, like Wichmann, lived in Amsterdam.

Wichmann's work was minimally decorated, with small, schematically depicted figures. She frequently used texts as decoration, consisting of slender capitals placed next to or above each other. Over the course of the 1930s, her figures became increasingly angular and strongly stylized, showing large hands, feet and heads. Wichmann's most important works bear the monogram AW or JW, and the lining often shows her full name and address in Amsterdam.

Wichmann applied various techniques, such as batik and handprint, cross stitch and white embroidery, but she mainly used appliqué, secured and detailed with various embroidery stitches.

=== Students ===
In the Netherlands, Wichmann's work was very well received. The style that she introduced with her compatriot Hildegard Fischer, was soon named "the modern German school." Until the late 1930s, her work sold well and was regularly exhibited. Wichmann was known to have trained several Dutch embroiderers, including Ernee 't Hooft, Johanna Klijn and Gerda Blankenheym.

=== Personal life ===
On 24 October 1938, she married W. Bierther in Siegburg, Germany, and in 1939 the couple settled in Bonn, Germany.

Wichmann died in Bonn, 27 September 1985.

=== Memberships ===
- Member of General Catholic Artists Association.
- Member of St. Bernulphus Guild from 1928.

== Awards ==
1937: Paris World's Fair (Grand Prize, Tapestry)
