= Louis G. Friedrichs =

American football player and coach (1917–1985)

Biographical details
- Born: August 25, 1917; New Orleans, Louisiana, US
- Died: September 18, 1985 (aged 68); Brookfield, Wisconsin, US

Playing career
- 1938–1940: Oklahoma
- Position: Running back

Coaching career (HC unless noted)
- 1941: Marquette University HS (WI)
- 1946–1948: Holy Cross School (LA)
- 1949: St. Louis University HS (MO)
- 1951–1954: Creighton Prep (NE)
- 1955–1959: St. Ambrose
- 1961–1967: Campion Jesuit HS (WI)

Louis Gaiennie Friedrichs (August 25, 1917 – September 18, 1985) was an American football player and coach. He served as the head football coach at St. Ambrose University in Davenport, Iowa, from 1955 to 1959.

Fredrichs was a running back at the University of Oklahoma from 1938 to 1940.

== Head coaching record ==
Year	Team	Overall	Conference	Standing
St. Ambrose Fighting Bees (Independent) (1955–1959)
1955	St. Ambrose	7–3		
1956	St. Ambrose	6–3		
1957	St. Ambrose	6–2		
1958	St. Ambrose	3–4–1		
1959	St. Ambrose	3–7		
St. Ambrose:		25–19–1		
Total:		25–19–1		
