= Gershon Benjamin =

American painter

- Born: January 6, 1899; Piatra Neamț, Romania
- Died: September 2, 1985; Free Acres, New Jersey
- Education: Edmond Dyonnet, Arthur-Dominique Rozaire
- Known for: Painting
- Movement: Modernism, modern expressionism

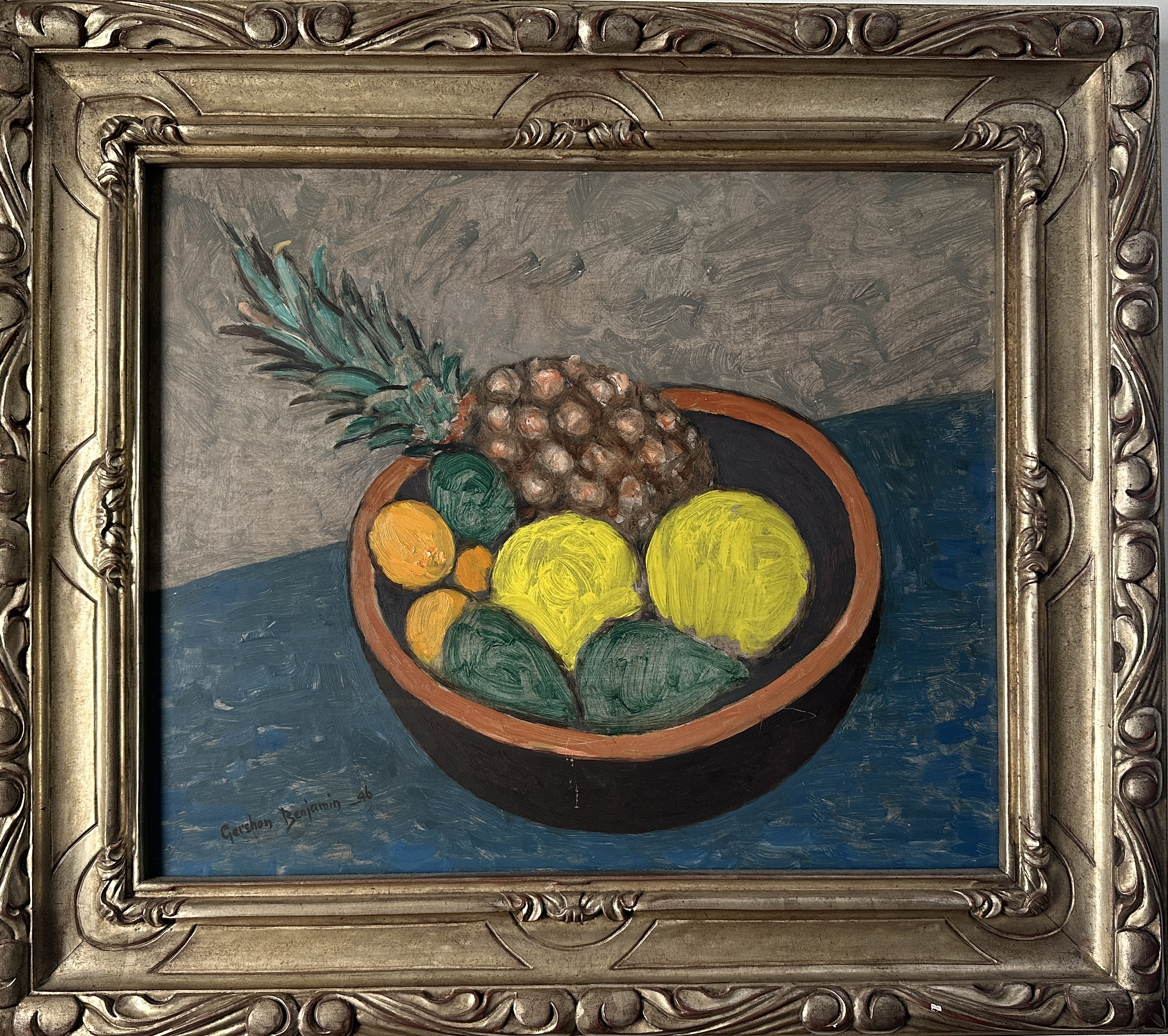
"Fruit Bowl" completed in 1946 by Gershon Benjamin.

Gershon Benjamin (January 6, 1899 – September 2, 1985) was an American modern painter. Born in Piatra Neamț, Romania, he immigrated with his family to Montreal at the age of two, to escape the persecution of Jews throughout Eastern Europe at the time. As a youth he was trained by Edmond Dyonnet and then mentored by landscape painter Arthur-Dominique Rozaire, whom he intended to follow to Los Angeles but his parents forbid it.

In 1923, Benjamin moved to New York City and married actress Hilda Zelda Cohen. He worked nights in the art department of The Sun and enrolled at Art Students League of New York, Cooper Union, and The Educational Alliance, where he began to etch and continued to draw and paint. His influences were Henri Matisse, Paul Cézanne, Pablo Picasso, Édouard Vuillard, and Rembrandt. He was also inspired by Japanese prints, folk art, and primitive painting. He formed a friendship with Milton Avery soon after Avery arrived in New York in 1925 and their families became close. Benjamin was part of a circle of artists which included Avery, Wallace Putnam, Mark Rothko, and Adolph Gottlieb. They often exhibited together in the 1930s, curated by Robert Ulrich Godsoe.

Benjamin’s emotive and consistent balance between realism and abstraction throughout his career, often saw him go unrecognized and left on the outside of whatever was in vogue at the time. In the 1940s, his generic subject matter was overlooked by the social realists, even though his images of common people and public places was reminiscent of the Ashcan School. In the 1950s, the completely non-representational forms of abstract expressionism had no place for Benjamin’s figural aspects, however abstract they may have been. And from the 1960s onward, pop-art, minimalism, and conceptual art had little in common with his work.

The Benjamins moved to Free Acres, New Jersey in the 1930s, drawn by the communal aspects and large concentration of visual artists, writers, and actors. Benjamin lost his job when The Sun closed in 1950, and then concentrated on painting. Gershon and Zelda became very involved in the community; he taught summer art courses and later instructed inmates in a drug rehabilitation program at Caldwell Penitentiary, while she directed plays at the community theater. Benjamin died in Free Acres at the age of 86, shortly after completing two retrospectives at Drew University and New Jersey Institute of Technology, his first solo exhibitions in 25 years.
