= Walter James Nungester =

American bacteriologist and immunologist

- Born: February 22, 1901
- Died: September 18, 1985 (aged 84)
- Education: M.D.
- Alma mater: University of Michigan Medical School

Walter James Nungester (February 22, 1901, Lima, Ohio – September 18, 1985, Ann Arbor, Michigan) was an American bacteriologist and immunologist. He was the president of the American Society for Microbiology in 1951.

== Biography ==
At the University of Michigan, Nungester graduated in 1923 with a B.S., in 1924 with an M.S., and in 1928 with a D.Sc. in bacteriology. His doctoral dissertation is titled Dissociation of Bacillus anthracis. In 1928 he matriculated as a medical student at Northwestern University Medical School (now named Feinberg School of Medicine). There, in the department of bacteriology, he was an instructor from 1928 to 1933 and an assistant professor from 1933 to 1935, when he graduated with an M.D. In the bacteriology department of the University of Michigan Medical School, he was an associate professor from 1935 to 1937 and a full professor from 1947 to 1970, when he retired as professor emeritus. From 1952 to 1970 he chaired the department. He was a member of several learned societies and served on the board of governors of the American Association of Immunologists.

Nungester did research on the biochemistry of phagocytosis, pathogenesis in animal models for experimental pneumonia and experimental anthrax, antiserum in the treatment of pneumonia, development of a vaccine against tuberculosis, and possibilities for vaccines against malignant neoplasms. He also did research on bacterial variation, disinfectants, and resistance to infection.

In 1933 he was elected a Fellow of the American Association for the Advancement of Science. He received in 1952 the Scientific Award from the American Academy of Tuberculosis Physicians and in 1956 the Centennial Distinguished Merit Award from Northwestern University.

Nungester married in 1924 and was the father of two daughters.

== Selected publications ==
- Nungester, W. J.; Watrous, R. M. (1934). "Accumulation of Bacteriophage in Spleen and Liver Following Its Intravenous Inoculation". Experimental Biology and Medicine. 31 (8): 901–905. doi:10.3181/00379727-31-7367c. S2CID 88439600. 1934
- Nungester, W. J.; Jourdonais, L. F.; Wolf, A. A. (1936). "The Effect of Mucin on Infections by Bacteria". The Journal of Infectious Diseases. 59 (1): 11–21. doi:10.1093/infdis/59.1.11. JSTOR 30088351.
- Nungester, W. J.; Klepser, R. G. (1938). "A Possible Mechanism of Lowered Resistance to Pneumonia". The Journal of Infectious Diseases. 63 (1): 94–102. doi:10.1093/infdis/63.1.94. JSTOR 30088402.
- Nungester, W. J.; Ames, Ada May (1948). "The Relationship between Ascorbic Acid and Phagocytic Activity". The Journal of Infectious Diseases. 83 (1): 50–54. doi:10.1093/infdis/83.1.50. JSTOR 30089432. PMID 18869807.
- Randall, H.M.; Smith, D.W.; Colm, A.C.; Nungester, W.J. (1951). "Correlation of Biologic Properties of Strains of Mycobacterium with Infrared Spectrums, I. Reproducibility of Extracts of M. Tuberculosis as Determined by Infra-Red Spectroscopy". American Review of Tuberculosis. 63 (4): 372–380. doi:10.1164/art.1951.63.4.372 (inactive 12 July 2025). PMID 14819556.
- Nungester, W. J. (1951). "Mechanisms of Man's Resistance to Infectious Diseases". Bacteriological Reviews. 15 (3): 105–129. doi:10.1128/br.15.3.105-129.1951. PMC 440981. PMID 14886293.
- Ekstedt, R. D.; Nungester, W. J. (1955). "Coagulase in Reversing Antibacterial Activity of Normal Human Serum on Micrococcus pyogenes". Experimental Biology and Medicine. 89 (1): 90–93. doi:10.3181/00379727-89-21724. PMID 14384887. S2CID 8837861.
- Alonso, Darwin; Nungester, Walter J. (1956). "Comparative Study of Host Resistance of Guinea Pigs and Rats: V. The Effect of Pneumococcal Products on Glycolysis and Oxygen Uptake by Polymorphonuclear Leucocytes". The Journal of Infectious Diseases. 99 (2): 174–181. doi:10.1093/infdis/99.2.174. JSTOR 30098285. PMID 13376911.
