= Kurt Wegner =

German artist

Kurt Wegner (27 August 1908 – 16 September 1985) was a German artist born in Köln, Germany. He moved to Sweden in 1938, and died in Järna.
