= Gerrit Van Roekel =

American politician (1899–1985)

Member of the Iowa House of Representatives from the 26th district
- In office January 9, 1967 – January 10, 1971
- Preceded by: Armour Boot
- Succeeded by: William Winkelman

Personal details
- Born: June 11, 1899 Leighton, Iowa
- Died: September 17, 1985 (aged 86) Pella, Iowa
- Party: Republican

Gerrit Van Roekel (June 11, 1899 – September 17, 1985) was an American politician who served in the Iowa House of Representatives from the 26th district from 1967 to 1971.

He died on September 17, 1985, in Pella, Iowa at age 86.
