= Barnet J. Segal =

American businessman and banker

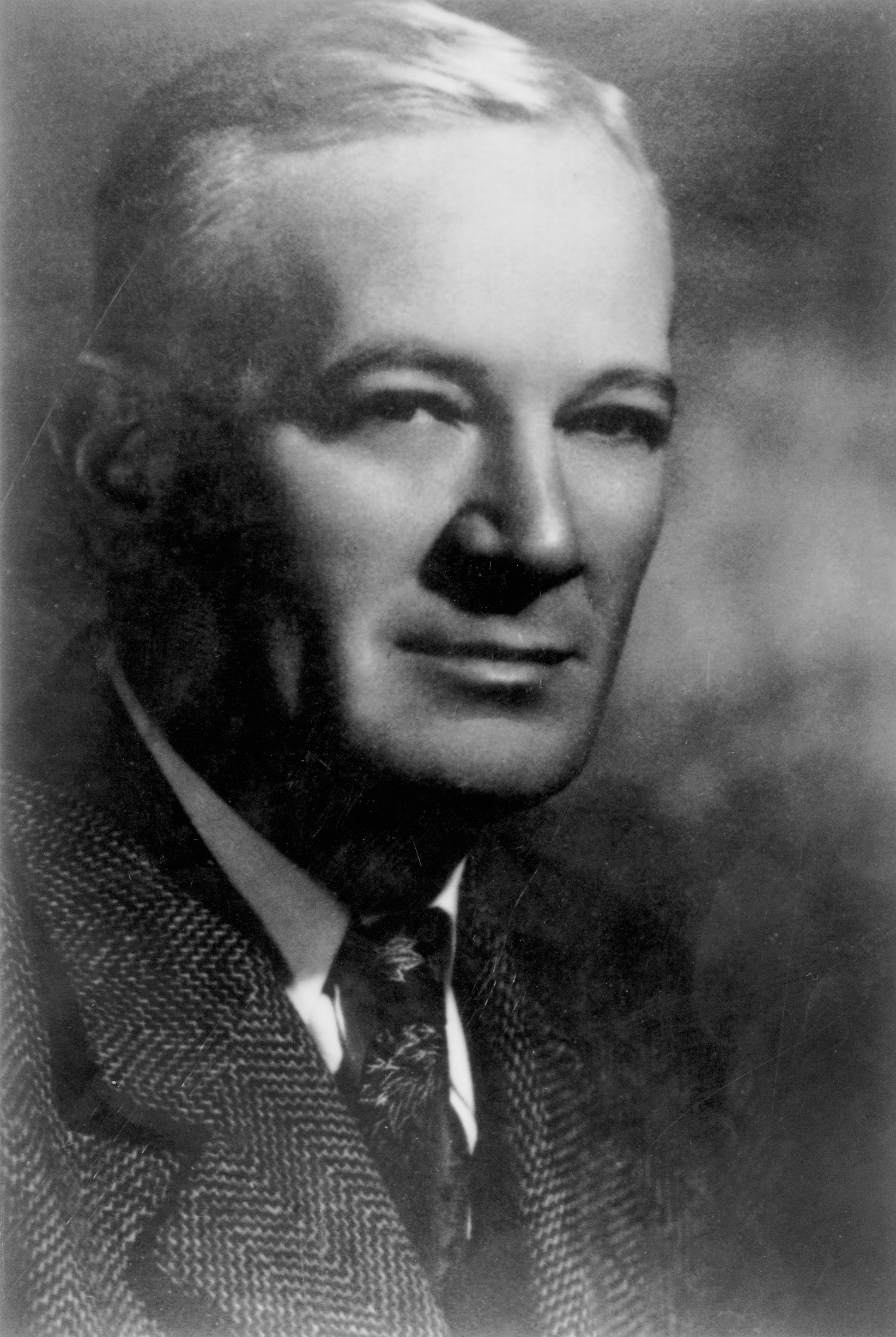
- Barnet J. Segal (1898–1985)
- Born: Barnet Joseph Segal; January 29, 1898; New York City, New York
- Died: 6 September 1985 (aged 87); Monterey, California, US
- Occupation: Banker

Barnet Joseph Segal (January 29, 1898 – September 6, 1985) was an American businessman and early investor and banker in Carmel-by-the-Sea, California.

== Professional background ==
=== Bank of Carmel ===
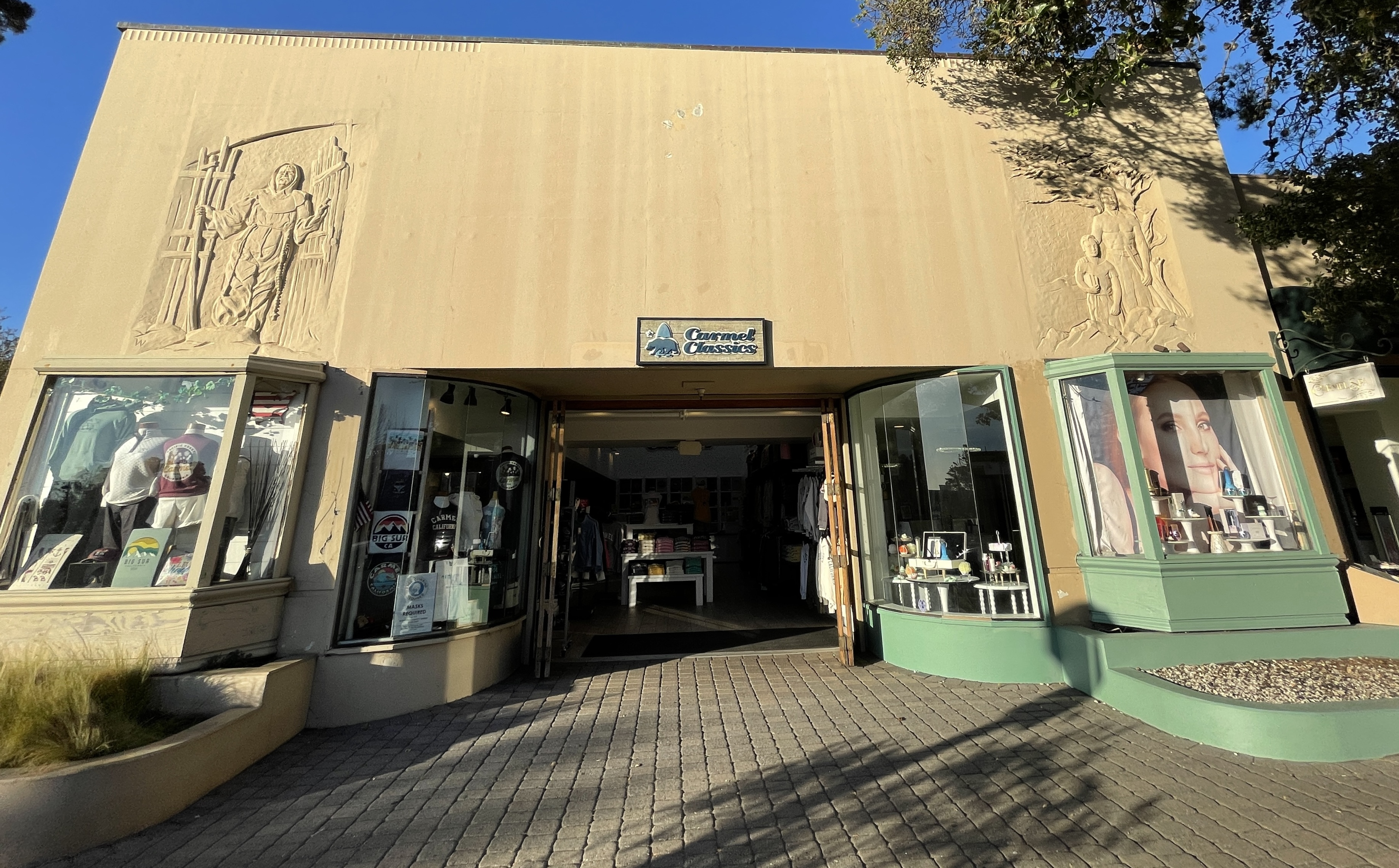
The once Bank of Carmel building.

The bank outgrew its old building, and in 1938, Segal was instrumental in the bank's move in 1939, to a new two-story concrete building for the Bank of Carmel, at the corner of Ocean Avenue and Dolores Street.

It was Carmel's first commercial bank and the only 1930s Art Deco style building in Carmel.

=== Carmel Investment Company ===
On October 15, 1936, Segal purchased the Carmel Investment Company on Ocean Avenue and San Carlos Street, from Donald Hale.

== Legacy ==
Segal set up the Barnet J. Segal Charitable Trust to distribute his estate for the benefit of Monterey County, California. Dr. Herbert and Elaine Berman of Carmel, executors of the trust, gave a $300,000 (equivalent to $619,065 in 2024) donation to the Carmel Public Library Foundation. The Barnet J. Segal Reading Room at the Harrison Memorial Library honors him and was dedicated with a special event on June 4, 1995.

The Westland House (short-term skilled nursing, rehabilitation, or end-of-life care) is at 100 BARNET SEGAL Lane, Monterey, California.

== See also ==
- Timeline of Carmel-by-the-Sea, California
