= List of Western Illinois University people =

The following is a list of notable people associated with Western Illinois University, located in the American city of Macomb, Illinois.

== Notable alumni ==
=== Politicians and government officials ===
==== Federal government ====
- Darwin Gale Schisler – Democratic member of the United States House of Representatives for Illinois's 19th congressional district from 1965 to 1967. He earned his B.A. at Western Illinois University
- Vincent R. Stewart – LtGen US Marine Corps and 20th Director of the Defense Intelligence Agency
- Tim Walberg – Republican member of the United States House of Representatives for Michigan's 7th congressional district since 2011. He attended Western Illinois University, but earned his B.A. at Taylor University

==== State legislators ====
- Tod Bowman – Democratic member of the Iowa Senate for District 29. He earned his M.Ed. at the university.
- Rich Brauer – Republican member of the Illinois House of Representatives for the 87th district (2003–2015). He attended Western, but did not graduate
- Kathie Conway – Republican member of the Missouri House of Representatives representing the 104th district since 2011. She graduated with a B.S. in Law Enforcement Administration
- Kirk Dillard – Republican member of the Illinois Senate (1994–2014) and gubernatorial candidate in 2010 and 2014.
- Randy Frese – Republican member of the Illinois House of Representatives representing the 94th district (2015–present). He earned B.S. in agriculture from Western
- Regis Groff – Democratic member of the Colorado Senate from the 33rd district (1974–1994). He was the second African-American elected to the Colorado Senate
- Norine Hammond – Republican member of the Illinois House of Representatives (2010–present). Her district, the 93rd, includes the university's Macomb campus
- Joe Hutter – Republican member of the Iowa House of Representatives from 2003 to 2007. He earned his B.A. from Western.
- Kimberly Lightford – Assistant Majority Leader in the Illinois Senate. She has represented the 4th district since 1998. She earned a B.A. in communications at Western.
- Mona Martin – Republican member of the Iowa House of Representatives for the 43rd district (1993-2001). She earned her B.S. from Western
- Jerry L. Mitchell – Republican member of the Illinois House of Representatives (1995–2012). He represented the 90th district and earned his Ed.S. at Western Illinois University
- John Millner – Republican member of the Illinois Senate representing the 28th district (2005–2013). Earned his master's degree in criminal justice administration at the university
- Richard P. Myers – Republican member of the Illinois House of Representatives (1995–2010. He earned his B.S. at the university
- Cynthia Nava – Democratic member of the New Mexico Senate from 1992 to 2012
- Timothy H. Osmond – Republican member of the Illinois House of Representatives from the 61st district (1999–2002)
- James O'Toole – Democratic member of the Missouri House of Representatives from 1992 to 2002. He attended Western Illinois University, but graduated from University of Missouri at St. Louis
- Matthew Rinker – Republican member of the Iowa House of Representatives from district 99 (2023–present). He graduated with a bachelor's degree in Political Science and Economics.
- Todd Sieben – Republican member of the Illinois Senate (1993–2008). He earned his B.S. in business administration at Western
- Mike Smiddy – Democratic member of the Illinois House of Representatives from the 71st district (2013–present). He attended Western Illinois University
- Litesa Wallace – Democratic member of the Illinois House of Representatives from the 67th district (2014–present). She earned her B.A. and M.Ed. from Western
- Frank B. Wood – Democratic member of the Iowa Senate from the 42nd district.

==== Local officeholders ====
- Matthew Shirk – Public Defender of Florida's Fourth Judicial Circuit Court (2008–16). He earned his B.S. at the university in 1997

==== Activists ====
- Mary Matalin – Republican political strategist who worked on the campaigns of Dave O'Neal, George H. W. Bush and served as chief of staff to Lee Atwater
- Erin Merryn – activist behind Erin’s Law, a law requiring kids be taught personal body safety education, which has been passed in 37 states
- Caryl M. Stern – president and CEO of the U.S. Fund for UNICEF. She is a human rights advocate who has worked for the Anti-Defamation League. She earned her M.S. at Western
- C. T. Vivian – leader in the Civil Rights Movement who participated in the Freedom Rides

==== International figures ====
- Ahmet Kenan Tanrıkulu – Turkish politician
- Camilo Osías – Filipino politician

=== Business ===
- Joe Creed – Chairman & CEO Caterpillar Inc
- Robert Nardelli – former chairman and chief executive officer of Chrysler, former president and CEO of Home Depot
- Jeremy Schoemaker – internet entrepreneur

=== Media and arts ===
- Samson Adetayo Adeleke – actor and filmmaker
- Michael Boatman – actor and author
- Cisco Cotto – radio host, pastor, and professor
- D2x – rapper
- Christopher Hall - singer and musician with Stabbing Westward
- Mark Konkol – 2011 Pulitzer Prize–winning journalist (Chicago Sun-Times)
- John Mahoney – actor, Frasier, taught at Western
- Doug Quick – broadcast weatherman, author and museum curator
- Warhol.SS – rapper, dropped out after one week

=== Education ===
- David L. Chicoine – 19th president of South Dakota State University (2007–present). He earned his M.A. at Western Illinois University
- Bob Krause – vice president for Institutional Advancement at Kansas State University (1986–2009). He served as acting Athletic Director from 2008 to 2009
- Michael Shonrock – 22nd president of Lindenwood University
- Paul Vallas – education administrator who has served as the chief executive for Chicago Public Schools (1995–2001), School District of Philadelphia (2002–2006) and the Recovery School District of Louisiana (2007–2012)
- Syed Abul Kalam Azad – treasurer of University of Dhaka

=== Athletes and coaches ===
- Jaelon Acklin – Canadian Football League
- Don Beebe – National Football League
- David Bowens – National Football League
- Fabien Bownes – National Football League
- Lee Calhoun – Olympic gold medal winner
- Bryan Cox – National Football League
- Joe Dykstra – National Basketball Association
- Booker Edgerson – National Football League
- Larry Garron – National Football League
- Don Greco – National Football League
- Rodney Harrison – National Football League
- Edgerton Hartwell – National Football League
- Frisman Jackson – National Football League
- William James – National Football League
- Kosuke Kimura – soccer midfielder for the Colorado Rapids of Major League Soccer
- Gary Lagesse – Hall of Fame Softball Coach
- Gene Lamont – Major League Baseball
- Rob Lazeo – Canadian Football League
- Lamar McGriggs – National Football League
- Russ Michna – Arena Football League
- Red Miller – former head coach of the NFL Denver Broncos and USFL Denver Gold
- Dennis Morgan – National Football League
- J. R. Niklos – National Football League
- Terell Parks (born 1991) - basketball player in the Israeli Basketball Premier League
- Paul Reuschel – Major League Baseball
- Rick Reuschel – Major League Baseball
- Khalen Saunders – Super Bowl champion (LIV) - National Football League
- Mike Scifres – National Football League
- Rich Seubert – National Football League
- Paul Singer – National Football League
- Rick Short – Major League Baseball
- Tom Soehn – director of soccer operations for Vancouver Whitecaps FC
- Aaron Stecker – National Football League
- John Teerlinck – National Football League
- Marco Thomas – Canadian Football League
- Mike Wagner – National Football League
- Jason Williams – National Football League
- Frank Winters – National Football league
- Doshia Woods – collegiate basketball coach
