= Western Illinois Leathernecks =

Sports teams of Western Illinois University

- University: Western Illinois University
- NCAA: Division I (FCS)
- Conference: Ohio Valley Conference (primary); OVC–Big South Football Association
- Athletic director: Paul Bubb
- Location: Macomb, Illinois
- Varsity teams: 20 (8 men's, 12 women's)
- Football stadium: Hanson Field
- Basketball arena: Western Hall
- Baseball stadium: Alfred D. Boyer Stadium
- Softball stadium: Mary Ellen McKee Softball Stadium
- Soccer stadium: MacKenzie Alumni Field
- Other venues: Harry Mussatto Golf Course; Spring Lake Course; Brophy Courts
- Nickname: Leathernecks
- Colors: Purple and gold
- Mascot: Colonel Rock (Live Bulldog), Rocky the Bulldog (Costumed Bulldog)
- Fight song: We're Marching On
- Website: goleathernecks.com
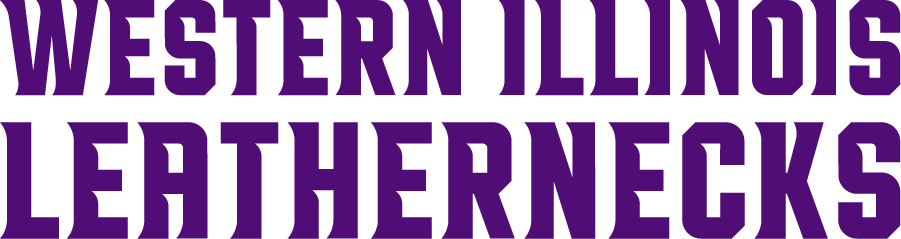

The Western Illinois Leathernecks are the teams and athletes that represent Western Illinois University, located in Macomb, Illinois, in NCAA Division I sports. The school is a member of the Ohio Valley Conference. Its football team is a member of the Division I FCS (formerly Division I-AA) OVC–Big South Football Association.

Previously Western Illinois was a member of the Summit League, with its football team playing in the Missouri Valley Football Conference (MVFC). On May 12, 2023, the school announced its departure from the Summit League to become a full member of the Ohio Valley Conference (OVC) in most sports beginning seven weeks subsequent on July 1. Two Leathernecks teams played outside the OVC in the fall 2023 season before joining the rest of the school's teams in the OVC in 2024—the football team in the MVFC, and the men's soccer team in the Summit League.

== History and nickname ==
WIU's nickname, the Leathernecks, and its mascot, the English bulldog, are taken from the traditions of the United States Marine Corps. The university has had permission to use the official nickname and mascot of the Corps since 1927, when Ray Hanson, then-athletic director and coach of the baseball, basketball and football teams, gained permission to use the symbols as an homage to his service in that military branch during World War I. The university holds the distinction of being the only non-military institution to officially have its nickname derived from a branch of the military service. Since the fall semester of 2009, the men's and women's teams have been unified under the Leathernecks name; previously, the women's teams and athletes at the school had been known as the Westerwinds.

On December 18, 2020, Western Illinois officially discontinued their men's and women's swimming programs citing budgetary and COVID-19 concerns. On May 12, 2023, Western Illinois accepted an invitation to join the Ohio Valley Conference starting the 2023–24 season. Prior to Western Illinois joining the Ohio Valley Conference, they were members of the Interstate Intercollegiate Athletic Conference from 1914 to 1970 and the Summit League from 1982 to 2023. Western leaves the Summit League after being the last charter member of the conference since it was founded in 1982. A week later on May 18, 2023, Western Illinois announced the addition of three more sports for women, this includes beach volleyball, bowling, and STUNT.

== Sports sponsored ==
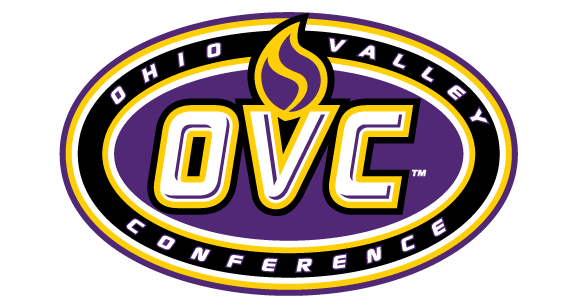
Ohio Valley Conference logo in Western Illinois' colors

Men's sports	Women's sports
Baseball	Basketball
Basketball	Beach volleyball
Cross country	Bowling
Football	Cross country
Golf	Golf
Soccer	Soccer
Track and field^{†}	Softball
	STUNT
	Tennis
	Track and field^{†}
	Volleyball
† – Track and field includes both indoor and outdoor

=== Baseball ===
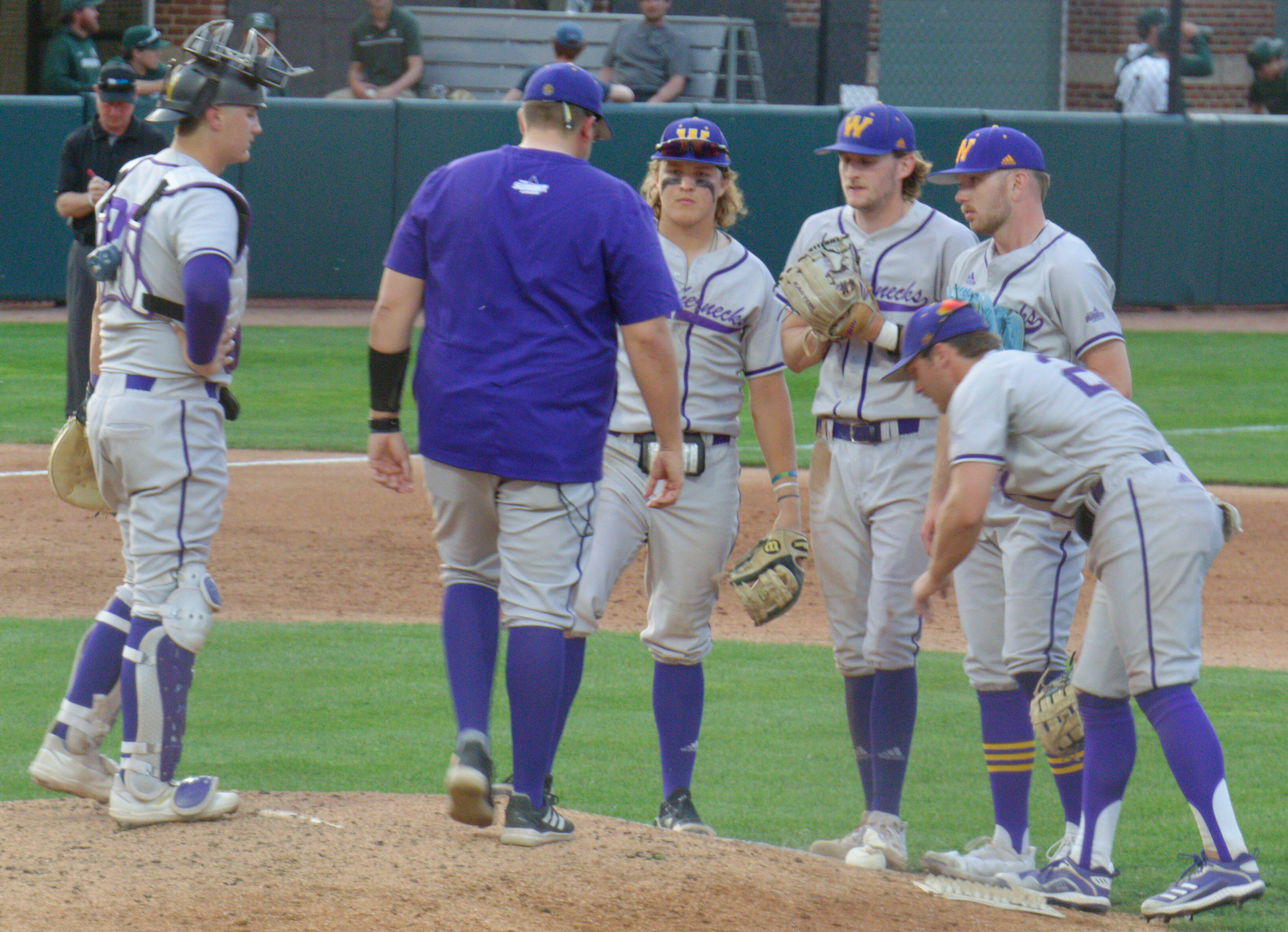
WIU baseball players during a game in 2023

The baseball team represents the university in NCAA Division I college baseball. The team is a member of the Ohio Valley Conference. It plays its home games at the 500-seat Alfred D. Boyer Stadium and are coached by Andy Pascoe.

=== Men's basketball ===
The men's basketball team competes in NCAA Division I men's college basketball competition. The school's team is a member of the Ohio Valley Conference. The team plays it home games at 5,139-seat Western Hall and are coached by Chad Boudreau.

=== Women's basketball ===
The women's basketball team is a member of the Ohio Valley Conference, which is part of the National Collegiate Athletic Association's Division I. The team plays its home games at 5,139-seat Western Hall and are coached by JD Gravina.

=== Men's cross country ===
The men's cross country team is a member of the Ohio Valley Conference, which is part of the National Collegiate Athletic Association's Division I. The team runs at Spring Lake Course. The team won the 1991 Summit League conference championship.

=== Football ===
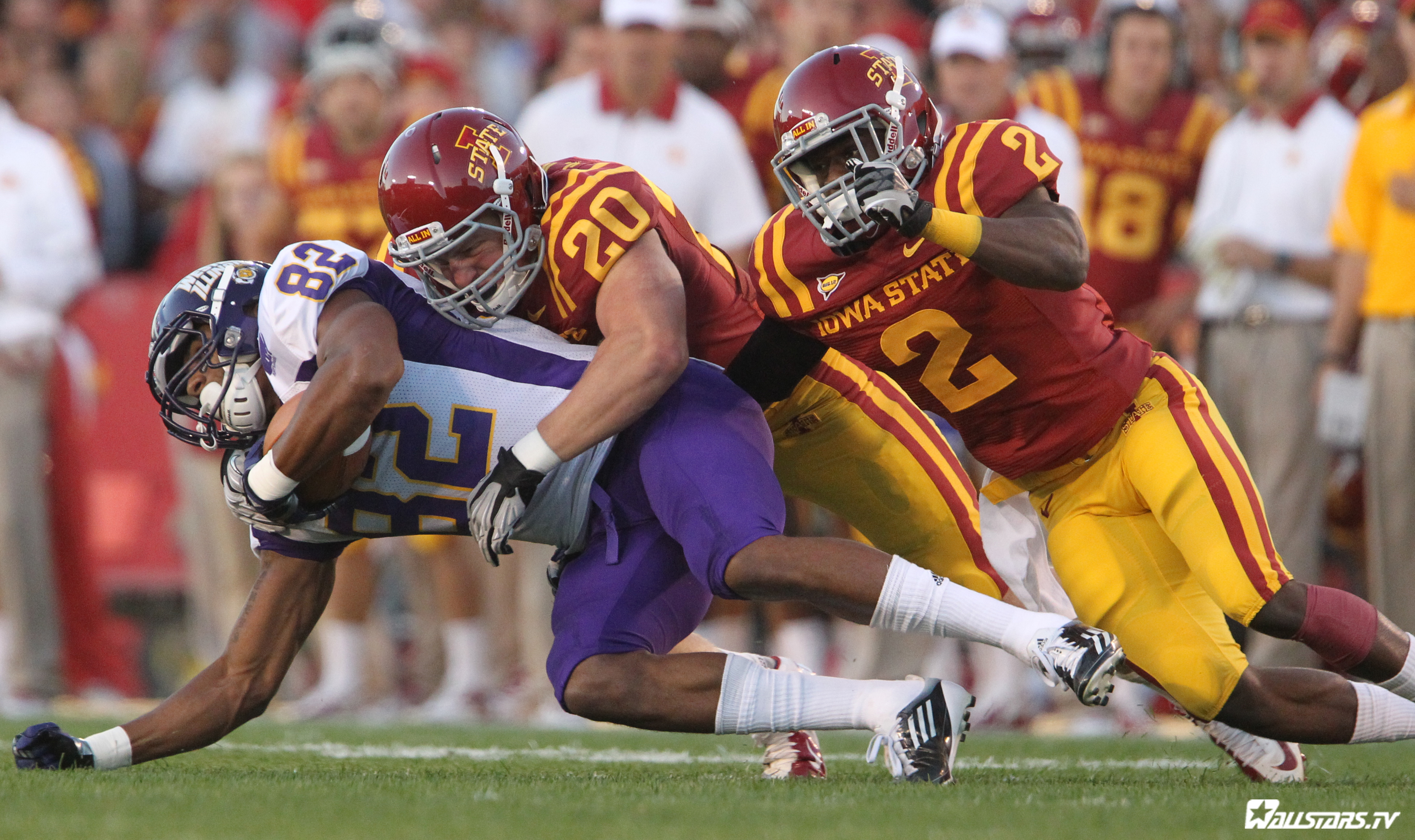
WIU v Iowa State football game in 2012

The football program competes in the NCAA Division I Football Championship Subdivision (FCS) and are members of the Ohio Valley Conference (OVC). WIU football plays in the OVC–Big South Football Association, a football-only alliance between the Ohio Valley and Big South conferences that shares a single automatic berth in the FCS playoffs.

The team has made numerous FCS (formerly Division I-AA) playoff appearances. The Leathernecks have been ranked as high as number one and ranked number two numerous times. The team plays its home games at the 16,368 seat Hanson Field and are coached by Joe Davis.

=== Men's golf ===
The men's golf team is a member of the Ohio Valley Conference, which is part of the National Collegiate Athletic Association's Division I. The team plays its home meets at Harry Mussatto Golf Course. The team has won eight Summit League championships in 1983, 1984, 1985, 1987, 2004, 2006, 2007, and 2008. They have made four NCAA Division I Men's Golf Championship appearances in 2004, 2006, 2007, and 2008.

=== Men's soccer ===
The men's soccer team played one final Summit League season in 2023 before joining the rest of the university's sports in the Ohio Valley Conference in 2024. Both conferences are part of the National Collegiate Athletic Association's Division I. The team plays its home games at 500-seat MacKenzie Alumni Field and are coached by Dr. Eric Johnson. at Harry Mussatto Golf Course. The team has won nine Summit League championships in 1995, 2000, 2004, 2005, 2006, 2009, 2011, 2012, and 2014. The team has also made six NCAA Division I men's soccer tournament appearances in 2004, 2005, 2006, 2009, 2011, and 2012.

=== Women's soccer ===
The women's soccer team, like its men's counterpart, is a member of the National Collegiate Athletic Association's Division I Ohio Valley Conference. The team plays its home games at 500-seat MacKenzie Alumni Field and are coached by Dr. Eric Johnson. The team won the 2007 Summit League conference championship.

=== Softball ===
The softball team is a member of the Ohio Valley Conference, which is part of the National Collegiate Athletic Association's Division I. The team plays its home games at 500-seat Mary Ellen McKee Softball Stadium and are coached by Alisa Goler. The team has won ten Summit League championships in 1993, 1995, 1996, 1997, 1998, 2000, 2001, 2007, 2008, and 2009. The team has appeared in eight Women's College World Series, in 1970, 1972, 1973, 1975, 1977, 1979, 1980 and 1982. The team has also made four NCAA Division I softball tournament appearances in 1992, 2000, 2001, and 2008.

=== Men's track and field ===
The team is a member of the Ohio Valley Conference, which is part of the National Collegiate Athletic Association's Division I. The team competes its home meets at Hanson Field. The team has won two Indoor Track and Field Summit League championships in 2001 and 2002. The team has also won two Outdoor Track and Field Summit League championships in 2001 and 2002.

=== Women’s track and field ===
The team is a member of the Ohio Valley Conference, which is part of the National Collegiate Athletic Association's Division I. The team competes its home meets at Hanson Field. The team has won two Outdoor Track and Field Summit League championships in 1996 and 2005.

=== Volleyball ===
The team is a member of the Ohio Valley Conference, which is part of the National Collegiate Athletic Association's Division I. The team plays its home games at 5,139-seat Western Hall and are coached by Ben Staupe.

== Athletic facilities ==
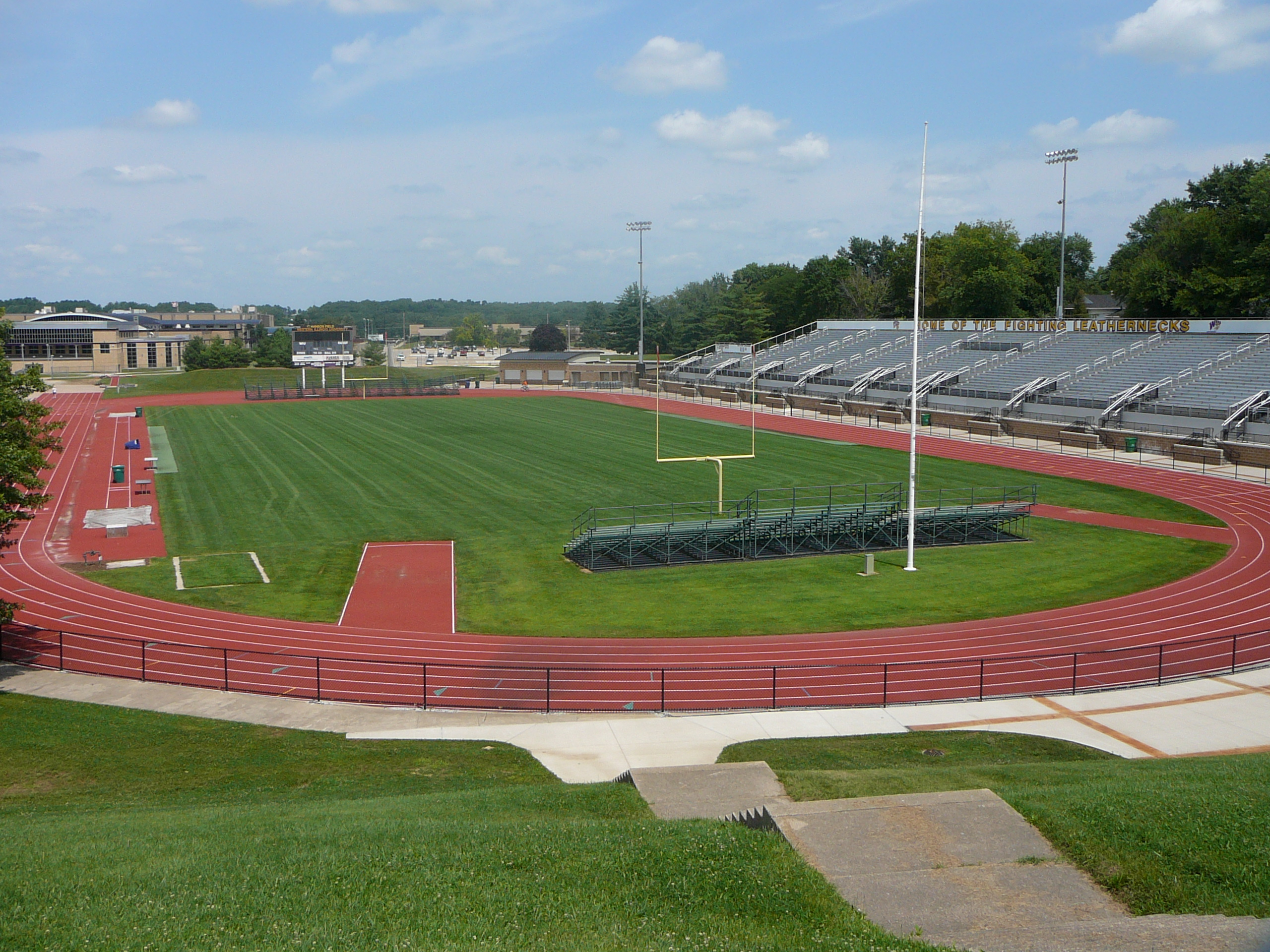
Hanson Field, football venue

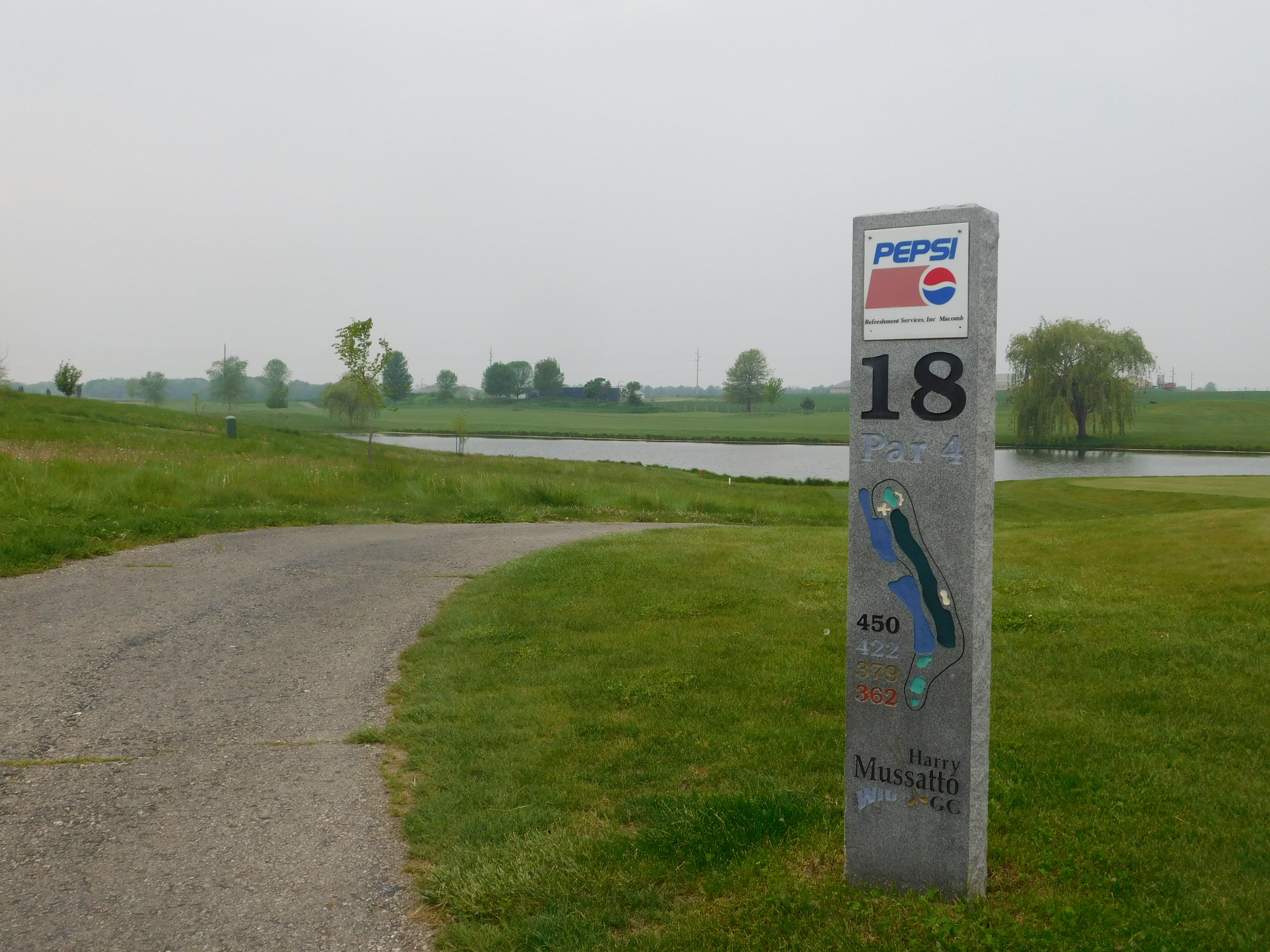
Harry Mussatto Golf Course

- Alfred D. Boyer Stadium — Baseball
- Brophy Courts — Women's tennis
- Hanson Field — Football, Men's and women's track and field
- Harry Mussatto Golf Course — Men's and women's golf
- MacKenzie Alumni Field — Men's and women's soccer
- Mary Ellen McKee Softball Stadium — Softball
- Spring Lake Course — Men's and women's cross country
- Western Hall — Men's and women's basketball, Volleyball

== Western Illinois traditions ==
=== Western Loyalty ===
The name of the "official" Alma Mater for Western Illinois University is "Western Loyalty".

=== We're Marching On ===
The name of the "official" fight song for Western Illinois University is "We're Marching On".

=== Western Illinois University Marching Leathernecks ===
The "Western Illinois University Marching Leathernecks" is the marching band which represents Western Illinois University in Macomb, Illinois.

=== Rocky the Bulldog ===
"Rocky the Bulldog" is the costumed athletics mascot for the Western Illinois Leathernecks. He first appeared in 1959.

=== Colonel Rock ===
"Colonel Rock" is the live athletics mascot for the Western Illinois Leathernecks.

=== Western Illinois Cheerleaders ===
The "Western Illinois Cheerleaders" are the co-ed cheerleading squad for the Western Illinois Leathernecks.

== Notable former athletes ==
=== Baseball ===
- Raymond Haley, Major League Baseball
- Gene Lamont, Major League Baseball
- Paul Reuschel, Major League Baseball
- Rick Reuschel, Major League Baseball
- Rick Short – Major League Baseball

=== Men's basketball ===
- Eulis Báez, Overseas
- Ceola Clark III, Overseas
- Joe Dykstra, drafted by the Phoenix Suns
- Obi Emegano, Overseas
- Brandon Gilbeck, Overseas
- Kristjan Makke, Overseas
- Mike Miklusak, Overseas
- Al Miksis, National Basketball Association
- Terell Parks, basketball player in the Israeli Basketball Premier League

=== Women's basketball ===
- Tuğba Palazoğlu, Overseas
- Zane Tamane, Women's National Basketball Association

=== American football ===
- Jaelon Acklin, Canadian Football League
- Jack Atchason, American Football League
- Todd Auer, National Football League
- Don Beebe, National Football League
- David Bowens, National Football League
- Fabien Bownes, National Football League
- Albert Brown, Canadian Football League
- Cyron Brown, National Football League
- Steve Carpenter, National Football League
- Sam Clemons, Arena Football League
- Bryan Cox, National Football League
- Terriun Crump, National Football League
- Wayne DeSutter, National Football League
- Herb Donaldson, National Football League
- John Earle, National Football League
- Booker Edgerson, National Football League
- Harry Gamage, Coach
- Larry Garron, American Football League
- Reggie Gray, Arena Football League
- Don Greco, National Football League
- Rodney Harrison, National Football League
- Edgerton Hartwell, National Football League
- Jeff Hecklinski, Coach
- Myers Hendrickson, Coach
- Dennis Houston, National Football League
- Frisman Jackson, National Football League
- Leroy Jackson, National Football League
- William James, National Football League
- Doug Kay, Coach
- Rob Lazeo, Canadian Football League
- Lance Lenoir, National Football League
- LaCale London, National Football League
- Jeff Loots, Arena Football League
- Bruce McCray, National Football League
- Mike McEachern, Canadian Football League
- Lamar McGriggs, National Football League
- Sean McGuire, Canadian Football League
- Russ Michna, Canadian Football League
- Red Miller, Coach
- Dennis Morgan, National Football League
- Peter Mueller, Canadian Football League
- Peter Muller, Canadian Football League
- J.R. Niklos, National Football League
- Bill O'Boyle, Coach
- Taylor Rowan, Arena Football League
- Khalen Saunders, National Football League
- Mike Scifres, National Football League
- Rich Seubert, National Football League
- Paul Singer, Arena Football League
- Aaron Stecker, National Football League
- Bill Strickland, National Football League
- John Teerlinck, National Football League
- Marco Thomas, Arena Football League
- David Tipton, National Football League
- Gunnard Twyner, National Football League
- Mike Wagner, National Football League
- David Watson, Coach
- Jason Williams, National Football League
- Frank Winters, National Football League

=== Soccer ===
- Kosuke Kimura, Major League Soccer
- Tom Soehn, director of soccer operations for Vancouver Whitecaps FC
- Ted Eck, former Major League Soccer player and member of United States national team

=== Softball ===
- Lu Harris-Champer, Coach
- Gary Lagesse, Hall of Fame Softball Coach

=== Track ===
- Lee Calhoun, Olympic gold medal winner

== See also ==
- List of NCAA Division I conference changes since 2010
