= Edward S. Dowell =

American football coach

Biographical details
- Born: January 4, 1888; Wooster, Ohio, U.S.
- Education: Oberlin (AB, 1910); Illinois (AM, 1913)

Coaching career (HC unless noted)

Football
- 1914: Western Illinois

Basketball
- 1914–1915: Western Illinois

Head coaching record
- Overall: 3–2–1 (football)

Edward Samuel Dowell (born December 14, 1888) was an American college football and college basketball coach and college faculty member. He served as the head football coach at Western Illinois State Normal School (now known as Western Illinois University) in 1914.

Dowellwas a 1910 graduate of Oberlin College in Oberlin, Ohio, and he received his master's degree from the University of Illinois at Urbana–Champaign in 1913.
