= Ralph Barclay =

American football, basketball and track coach

Biographical details
- Born: September 11, 1903
- Died: October 18, 1958 (aged 55)
- Education: Western Illinois Normal

Coaching career (HC unless noted)

Football
- 1948–1949: McKendree

Basketball
- 1926–1929: Western Illinois

Track
- 1927–1947: Western Illinois

Head coaching record
- Overall: 4–12 (football); 47–28 (basketball)

Ralph E. Barclay Sr. (September 11, 1903 – October 18, 1958) was an American football, basketball and track coach. He served as the head men's basketball coach at Western Illinois University (then known as Western Illinois Normal School) in Macomb, Illinois from 1926 to 1929. Barclay was the head football coach at McKendree College from 1948 to 1949.

== Head coaching record ==
=== Football ===
Year	Team	Overall	Conference	Standing	Bowl/playoffs
McKendree Bearcats (Pioneer Conference) (1948–1949)
1948	McKendree	1–7	0–3	4th	
1949	McKendree	3–5	1–2	T–2nd	
McKendree:		4–12	1–5		
Total:		4–12			
