= W. A. Cleveland =

American football coach and agriculturist

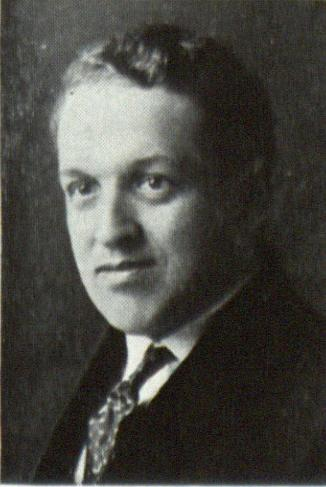
- Cleveland pictured in Sequel 1922, Western Illinois yearbook

Biographical details
- Born: October 22, 1890
- Died: August 25, 1952 (aged 61)

Coaching career (HC unless noted)
- 1920–1921: Western Illinois

Head coaching record
- Overall: 3–6–2

Waldo Atwood Cleveland (October 22, 1890 – August 25, 1952) was an agriculturist who was the head football coach for the Western Illinois University Leathernecks located in Macomb, Illinois and he held that position for two seasons, from 1920 until 1921. His career coaching record at Western Illinois was 3 wins, 6 losses, and 2 ties. This ranks him 17th at Western Illinois in total wins and 16th at Western Illinois in winning percentage.
