= JBV =

JBV is a commonly used abbreviation for the following subjects:

== Management ==
- Journal of Business Venturing, a bimonthly peer-reviewed academic journal on entrepreneurship, published by Elsevier

== People ==
- Jacqueline B. Vaughn, a twentieth century American Chicago Public Schools special education teacher and labor leader
- Jean-Baptiste Vuillaume, a nineteenth century French luthier, businessman and inventor

== Travel ==
- Jernbaneverket, a government agency responsible for owning, maintaining, operating and developing the Norwegian railway network
