= Vaughn High School =

Vaughn High School may refer to:

- Vaughn Occupational High School
- Vaughn High School (Vaughn, New Mexico) of the Vaughn Municipal Schools school district
