= 1964 Central Michigan Chippewas football team =

American college football season

1964 Central Michigan Chippewas football
- Conference: Interstate Intercollegiate Athletic Conference
- Record: 4–5 (1–3 IIAC)
- Head coach: Kenneth Kelly (14th season)
- MVP: Bruce Wyman
- Home stadium: Alumni Field

1964 Interstate Intercollegiate Athletic Conference football standings
	Conf.					Overall
Team	W		L		T	W		L		T
Northern Illinois +	3	–	1	–	0	7	–	2	–	0
Western Illinois +	3	–	1	–	0	6	–	3	–	0
Illinois State	2	–	2	–	0	5	–	4	–	0
Central Michigan	1	–	3	–	0	4	–	5	–	0
Eastern Illinois	1	–	3	–	0	3	–	6	–	0
+ – Conference co-champions

The 1964 Central Michigan Chippewas football team represented Central Michigan University in the Interstate Intercollegiate Athletic Conference (IIAC) during the 1964 NCAA College Division football season. In their 14th season under head coach Kenneth Kelly, the Chippewas compiled a 4–5 record (1–3 against IIAC opponents) and were outscored by their opponents by a combined total of 148 to 117.

The team's statistical leaders included quarterback Pat Boyd with 607 passing yards, halfback Bruce Wyman with 823 rushing yards, and halfback Jamie Gent with 422 receiving yards. Wyman received the team's most valuable player award. Four Central Michigan players (Gent, Wyman, offensive guard Ken Bickel, and linebacker Frank Goldberg) received first-team honors on the All-IIAC team.

Al Thomas was the backfield coach, and Jerry Sieracki was the line coach. Dr. C. F. Anderson was the team physician. Daniel P. Rose was the athletic director.

== Schedule ==
Date	Opponent	Site	Result	Attendance	Source
September 12	vs. Whitewater State*	Saginaw, MI	W 13–7		
September 26	at Western Michigan*	Waldo Stadium; Kalamazoo, MI (rivalry)	W 18–6	13,000	
October 3	at Eastern Illinois	Lincoln Field; Charleston, IL	L 14–17	1,423	
October 10	Northern Michigan*	Alumni Field; Mount Pleasant, MI	L 7–12		
October 17	Western Illinois^{†}	Alumni Field; Mount Pleasant, MI	L 7–41	10,000	
October 24	Illinois State	Alumni Field; Mount Pleasant, MI	W 12–0		
October 31	Youngstown State*	Alumni Field; Mount Pleasant, MI	W 25–20		
November 7	Northern Illinois	Alumni Field; Mount Pleasant, MI	L 14–19	11,219	
November 14	at Hillsdale*	Hillsdale, MI	L 7–26	2,000	
*Non-conference game; ^{†}Homecoming
