= Art Dufelmeier =

American football player and coach (1923–2010)

- Dufelmeier pictured in Sequel 1961, Western Illinois yearbook

Biographical details
- Born: July 21, 1923; Beardstown, Illinois, U.S.
- Died: February 4, 2010 (aged 86); Havana, Illinois, U.S.

Playing career
- 1942, 1946–1947: Illinois
- Position: Halfback

Coaching career (HC unless noted)
- 1957–1959: Western Illinois (assistant)
- 1960–1968: Western Illinois

Head coaching record
- Overall: 37–39–2 (college)

Accomplishments and honors

Championships
- 1 IIAC (1964)

Arthur J. Dufelmeier (July 21, 1923 – February 4, 2010) was the head football coach at Western Illinois University in Macomb, Illinois and he held that position for nine seasons, from 1960 until 1968. His record at Western Illinois was 37–39–2.

Dufelmeier played football as a halfback at the University of Illinois at Urbana–Champaign, leading the Fighting Illini to a win at the 1947 Rose Bowl. He finished his coaching career at Havana High School, which now has its home field named after their coach.

== Head coaching record ==
=== College ===
| Year | Team | Overall | Conference | Standing | Bowl/playoffs |
|---|---|---|---|---|---|
Western Illinois Leathernecks (Interstate Intercollegiate Athletic Conference) (1960–1968)
| 1960 | Western Illinois | 6–2 | 5–1 | 2nd | |
| 1961 | Western Illinois | 5–3 | 4–2 | T–2nd | |
| 1962 | Western Illinois | 5–3 | 2–2 | 3rd | |
| 1963 | Western Illinois | 6–3 | 3–1 | 2nd | |
| 1964 | Western Illinois | 6–3 | 3–1 | T–1st | |
| 1965 | Western Illinois | 4–5 | 2–2 | 3rd | |
| 1966 | Western Illinois | 1–7–1 | 1–2 | 3rd | |
| 1967 | Western Illinois | 2–6 | 1–2 | T–3rd | |
| 1968 | Western Illinois | 2–7–1 | 1–2 | T–3rd | |
| Western Illinois: | | 37–39–2 | 3–0 | | |
| Total: | | 37–39–2 | | | |
National championship Conference title Conference division title or championship game berth
