= David Watson (coach) =

American football coach (born 1976)

Biographical details
- Born: August 16, 1976 (age 50)

Playing career
- 1994-1996: Minnesota
- 1997-1999: Western Illinois
- Position: Defensive end

Coaching career (HC unless noted)
- 2002-2003: SW Minnesota State (GA)
- 2004: Michigan State (GA)
- 2005-2008: Southern California (DL/ST)

David Watson (born August 16, 1976) is an American football coach. He was most recently the Defensive Line Coach for the University of Southern California (USC) Trojans.

== Coaching career ==
Watson began his college coaching career at NCAA Division II Southwest Minnesota State. While there he served as a graduate assistant working with the defensive line in 2002, transitioning to a full-time assistant in 2003 handling the defensive line, linebackers and the front seven. In 2004, he served as a Defensive Graduate Assistant for Michigan State.

Watson joined the staff at USC in February 2005, serving his first year as an offensive line graduate assistant. He was promoted to full-time assistant working with the defensive line in February 2006. Among the players he coached at USC were Sedrick Ellis and Lawrence Jackson. After a shift in defensive coaching personnel in January 2009, Watson was no longer with the program.

== College career ==
Watson played defensive end in college, beginning his career at Minnesota. As a freshman, he earned Academic All-Big Ten honors in 1994; his career was then beset by two season-ending injuries that caused him to take medical redshirt seasons for both 1995 and 1996. He then opted to transfer to Division I-AA Western Illinois where he played for three seasons (1997–1999), earning All-Gateway Conference selection all three years while setting WIU records for season (41) and career (72) tackles for loss. His injuries finally caused him to end his playing career in 1999. He graduated from WIU in 2001.

== High school career ==
Watson began playing football at age 7, and prepped at Bloomington Jefferson High School in Bloomington, Minnesota. A three-sport athlete, he was the Minnesota Gatorade Player of the Year in football in 1993.

== Personal ==
Watson is married with two children. During his first two seasons with USC, former high school teammate Lane Kiffin served as Offensive coordinator for the Trojans. His players have nicknamed him "Coach Sweaty" due to his heavy perspiration during practices.

Watson successfully fought an addiction to prescription painkillers such as Vicodin and Soma: He had developed an early addiction due to injuries while playing college football, but after weaning himself off he relapsed after injuring himself while working in construction. On May 17, 2008, Watson was arrested under suspicion of driving under the influence of prescription drugs and underwent rehabilitation treatment after encouragement from USC Head Coach Pete Carroll. Watson and USC were named in a personal injury lawsuit arising from the accident.
