= 1964 Western Illinois Leathernecks football team =

American college football season

1964 Western Illinois Leathernecks football

IIAC co-champion
- Conference: Interstate Intercollegiate Athletic Conference
- Record: 6–3 (3–1 IIAC)
- Head coach: Art Dufelmeier (5th season)
- Home stadium: Hanson Field

1964 Interstate Intercollegiate Athletic Conference football standings
	Conf.					Overall
Team	W		L		T	W		L		T
Northern Illinois +	3	–	1	–	0	7	–	2	–	0
Western Illinois +	3	–	1	–	0	6	–	3	–	0
Illinois State	2	–	2	–	0	5	–	4	–	0
Central Michigan	1	–	3	–	0	4	–	5	–	0
Eastern Illinois	1	–	3	–	0	3	–	6	–	0
+ – Conference co-champions

The 1964 Western Illinois Leathernecks football team represented Western Illinois University as a member of the Interstate Intercollegiate Athletic Conference (IIAC) during the 1964 NCAA College Division football season. They were led by fifth-year head coach Art Dufelmeier and played their home games at Hanson Field. The Leathernecks finished the season with a 6–3 record overall and a 3–1 record in conference play, sharing the IIAC title with Northern Illinois.

== Schedule ==
Date	Opponent	Site	Result	Attendance	Source
September 19	Northeast Missouri State*	Hanson Field; Macomb, IL	L 10–14	6,600	
September 26	at Bradley*	Peoria, IL	W 9–0	3,000	
October 3	at Drake*	Drake Stadium; Des Moines, IA	W 14–12	6,500–8,000	
October 10	St. Norbert*	Hanson Field; Macomb, IL	W 23–22	3,300	
October 17	at Central Michigan	Alumni Field; Mount Pleasant, MI	W 41–7	10,000	
October 24	at Montana*	Dornblaser Field; Missoula, MT	L 0–7	3,500	
October 31	Northern Illinois	Hanson Field; Macomb, IL	W 20–7	9,200–12,000	
November 7	at Illinois State	Hancock Stadium; Normal, IL	L 21–27	5,000–7,000	
November 14	Eastern Illinois	Hanson Field; Macomb, IL	W 30–14	6,200	
*Non-conference game
