= Spring Lake Park (Illinois) =

Park in McDonough County, Illinois, United States

Coordinates: 40.510°N 90.716°W

Spring Lake Park is a public park located in Macomb, Illinois. The park is home to 230-acre (0.93 km^{2}) Spring Lake, areas for camping, and three mountain bike trails. Spring Lake is the fresh water reservoir for the city of Macomb, and is noted for superb bass fishing that draws several regional fishing tournaments.

== Spring Lake Course ==
The Spring Lake Course is a cross country running course located in Spring Lake Park. It is the home venue for the Western Illinois Leathernecks men's and women's cross country teams.

== Cougar sightings ==
Cougars disappeared from Illinois in the 19th century. Since July 2000, two dead cougars have been discovered along the state's western border, while so-called cougar sightings have been widespread throughout the state. In 2006, several area residents claimed to have seen cougars in the Spring Lake Park area, in one case stalking native white-tailed deer. Melissa Roberts, a biology student at nearby Western Illinois University, discovered tracks and other evidence that may point to the presence of a big cat in the area. Biology professor Dr. Michael Romano claims that the tracks did indeed appear feline, though the Illinois Department of Natural Resources has stated that without definitive scientific verification, no action would be taken on the sightings.
