= Albert Walrath =

American football and basketball coach (1885–1926)

Biographical details
- Born: December 14, 1885; Waupun, Wisconsin, U.S.
- Died: September 21, 1926 (aged 40); Hillsdale, Michigan, U.S.
- Education: Hillsdale (1908)

Coaching career (HC unless noted)

Football
- 1911: Western Illinois

Basketball
- 1911–1914: Western Illinois

Head coaching record
- Overall: 4–3 (football)

Albert Leland Walrath (December 14, 1885 – September 21, 1926) was an American football and basketball coach.

He was a 1908 graduate of Hillsdale College in Hillsdale, Michigan. He later served as a professor at his alma mater.

He was the head football coach (1911) and head basketball coach (1911–1914) at Western Illinois University (then known as Western Normal College).
