= 1964 Northern Illinois Huskies football team =

American college football season

1964 Northern Illinois Huskies football

IIAC co-champion
- Conference: Interstate Intercollegiate Athletic Conference
- Record: 7–2 (3–1 IIAC)
- Head coach: Howard Fletcher (9th season)
- MVP: Jack Dean
- Captains: Jack Dean; Lynn McCann
- Home stadium: Glidden Field

1964 Interstate Intercollegiate Athletic Conference football standings
	Conf.					Overall
Team	W		L		T	W		L		T
Northern Illinois +	3	–	1	–	0	7	–	2	–	0
Western Illinois +	3	–	1	–	0	6	–	3	–	0
Illinois State	2	–	2	–	0	5	–	4	–	0
Central Michigan	1	–	3	–	0	4	–	5	–	0
Eastern Illinois	1	–	3	–	0	3	–	6	–	0
+ – Conference co-champions

The 1964 Northern Illinois State Huskies football team represented Northern Illinois University as a member of the Interstate Intercollegiate Athletic Conference (IIAC) during the 1964 NCAA College Division football season. Led by ninth-year head coach Howard Fletcher, the Huskies compiled an overall record of 7–2 with a mark of 3–1 in conference play, sharing the IIAC with Western Illinois. The team played home games at the 5,500-seat Glidden Field, located on the east end of campus, in DeKalb, Illinois.

== Schedule ==
Date	Opponent	Site	Result	Attendance	Source
September 19	at Whitewater State*	Whitewater, WI	W 32–13	4,000	
September 26	at Omaha*	Al F. Caniglia Field; Omaha, NE	L 20–26	8,100	
October 3	Milwaukee*	Glidden Field; DeKalb, IL	W 29–18	9,107	
October 10	at Illinois State	Hancock Stadium; Normal, IL	W 20–14	5,400	
October 17	Bradley*	Glidden Field; DeKalb, IL	W 14–3	8,703	
October 24	Eastern Illinois	Glidden Field; DeKalb, IL	W 35–14	11,800	
October 31	at Western Illinois	Hanson Field; Macomb, IL	L 43–0	9,200–12,000	
November 7	Central Michigan	Glidden Field; DeKalb, IL	W 19–14	11,219	
November 14	State College of Iowa*	Glidden Field; DeKalb, IL	W 14–9	7,018–7,019	
*Non-conference game
