= Western Illinois Leathernecks football =

Intercollegiate American football team

2026 Western Illinois Leathernecks football team
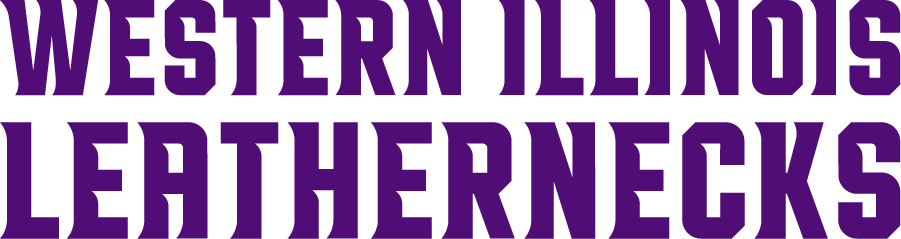
- First season: 1902; 124 years ago
- Athletic director: Paul Bubb
- Head coach: Joe Davis; 3rd season, 8–16 (.333)
- Location: Macomb, Illinois
- Stadium: Hanson Field (capacity: 16,368)
- NCAA division: Division I FCS
- Conference: Ohio Valley
- Colors: Purple and gold
- All-time record: 556–533–37 (.510)
- Bowl record: 2–1 (.667)

Conference championships
- IIAC: 1939, 1942, 1949, 1958, 1959, 1964, 1969 AMCU: 1981 GCAC: 1988 Gateway: 1997, 1998, 2000, 2002 OVC: 2026
- Fight song: We're Marching On
- Mascot: Colonel Rock (live Bulldog), Rocky (costumed Bulldog)
- Marching band: Western Illinois University Marching Leathernecks
- Outfitter: Adidas
- Website: goleathernecks.com

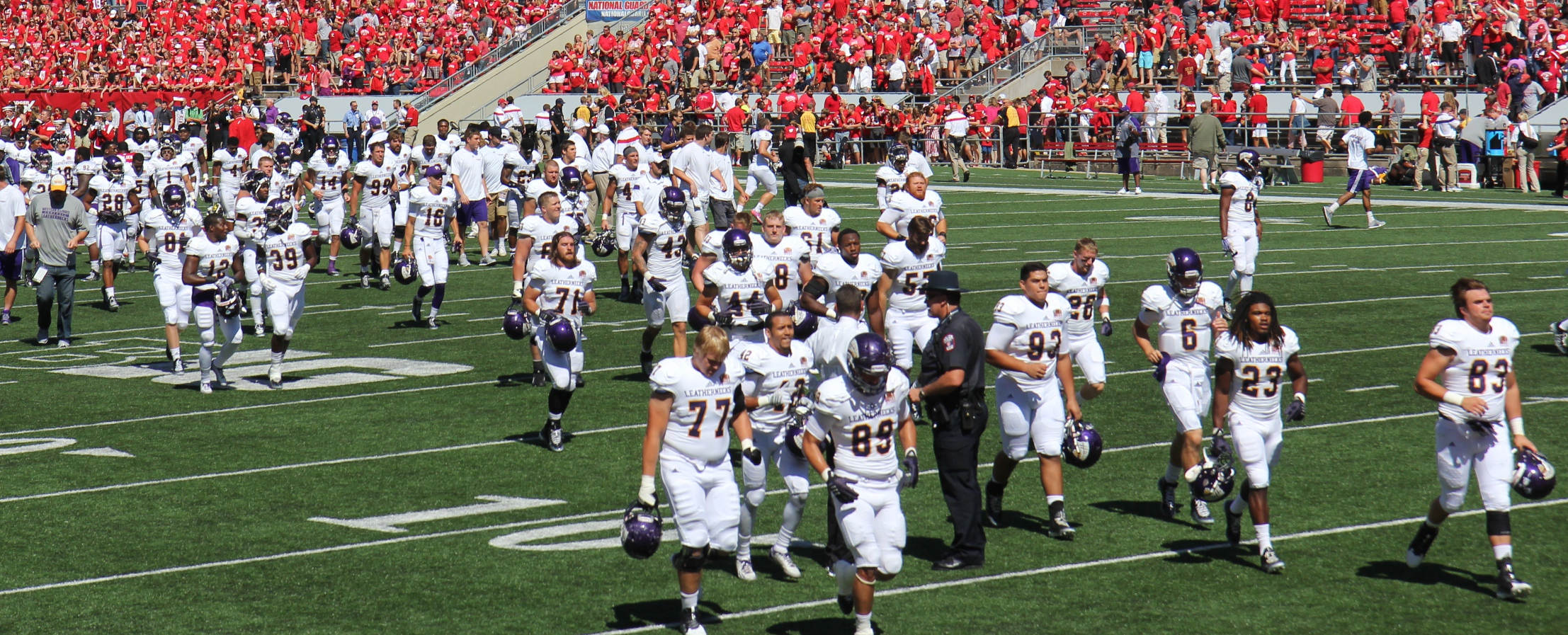
Western Illinois Leathernecks

The Western Illinois Leathernecks football program is the intercollegiate American football team for Western Illinois University, located in Macomb, Illinois. The team competes in the NCAA Division I Football Championship Subdivision (FCS) as a member of the Ohio Valley Conference (OVC). The team plays its home games at the 16,368 seat Hanson Field.

== History ==
Western Illinois had an unofficial football team in 1902, the year the school was established. The team played four games against regional high schools and the Western Illinois Normal & Business Institute going 2–2. In 1903, the school formed an athletic association for the fall football season, which is considered the official beginning of Western Illinois football by the school.

The team adopted its nickname in 1927 when coach Ray Hanson, a decorated officer in the United States Marine Corps, asked the U.S. Navy for permission to use the Corps' Fighting Leathernecks nickname and logo for his team. Western Illinois is the only college which officially takes its nickname from a branch of the U.S. military.

From 2008 through 2023, the Leathernecks were members of the Missouri Valley Football Conference. The football team joined the Ohio Valley Conference (OVC) in 2024. The other Leathernecks athletic programs transitioned to the OVC one year prior, on July 1, 2023.

== Conference affiliations ==
Years	Conference	Classification
1902–1913	Independent	
1914–1949	Illinois Intercollegiate Athletic	
1950–1969	Interstate Intercollegiate Athletic	NCAA College Division
1970–1972	Independent	NCAA College Division
1973–1977	Independent	Division II
1978–1980	Mid-Continent	Division II
1981–1984	Mid-Continent	Division I-AA
1985–2005	Gateway Football	Division I-AA
2006–2007	Gateway Football	Division I Football Championship Subdivision (FCS)
2008–2023	Missouri Valley Football	Division I Football Championship Subdivision (FCS)
2024–present	Ohio Valley	Division I Football Championship Subdivision (FCS)

== Championships ==
=== Conference championships ===
Years	Conference	Overall Record	Conference Record
1939	Illinois Intercollegiate Athletic Conference	5–1–1	2–0–1
1942	Illinois Intercollegiate Athletic Conference	5–0–2	3–0–1
1949	Illinois Intercollegiate Athletic Conference	9–1–0	4–0
1958	Illinois Intercollegiate Athletic Conference	6–1–1	5–1
1959	Illinois Intercollegiate Athletic Conference	9–0–0	6–0
1964†	Illinois Intercollegiate Athletic Conference	6–3–0	3–1
1969	Illinois Intercollegiate Athletic Conference	8–2–0	3–0
1981†	Mid-Continent	5–6	2–1
1988	Gateway Collegiate Athletic Conference	10–2–0	6–0
1997	Gateway Football Conference	8–3	4–1
1998	Gateway Football Conference	11–2	6–0
2000	Gateway Football Conference	9–3	5–1
2002†	Gateway Football Conference	11–2	6–1
2026	Ohio Valley Conference	8–4	6–1

† Co-championship

== Playoffs and bowls ==
=== Playoffs ===
Season	Result	Classification	Note
1973	First Round	NCAA Division II Playoffs	
1988	First Round	NCAA Division I-AA Playoffs	
1991	First Round	NCAA Division I-AA Playoffs	
1996	First Round	NCAA Division I-AA Playoffs	
1997	Quarterfinals	NCAA Division I-AA Playoffs	(Pecan Bowl)
1998	Semifinals	NCAA Division I-AA Playoffs	(Pecan Bowl)
2000	First Round	NCAA Division I-AA Playoffs	
2002	Quarterfinals	NCAA Division I-AA Playoffs	(Pecan Bowl)
2003	Quarterfinals	NCAA Division I-AA Playoffs	(Pecan Bowl)
2010	Second Round	NCAA Division I FCS Playoffs	
2015	Second Round	NCAA Division I FCS Playoffs	
2017	First Round	NCAA Division I FCS Playoffs	

*Note: Since 1981, the NCAA Division I-AA/Division I FCS Playoffs Regional Championships were commonly referred to as the Boardwalk Bowl (East Region Championship), Pecan Bowl (Midwest Region Championship), Grantland Rice Bowl (South Region Championship), and Camellia Bowl (West Region Championship).

=== Bowl games ===
Season	Bowl	Opponent	Result
1949	Corn Bowl	Wheaton	W 13–0
1953	Corn Bowl	Iowa Wesleyan	W 32–0
1955	Corn Bowl	Luther	L 20–24

== Head coaches ==
Years	Name
1902–1903	Unknown
1904	L. H. Laughlin
1905	A. Laughlin
1906, 1910	Oliver Morton Dickerson
1907–1908	Charles A. Barnett
1909	Francis Taft
1911	Albert Walrath
1912–1913	Unknown
1914	Edward S. Dowell
1915	Unknown
1916–1917, 1919	Erskine Jay
1918	No team
1920–1921	W. A. Cleveland
1922–1925	Howard Hawkes
1926–1941	Ray Hanson
1942–1943	Wix Garner
1944	Bob Barnwell
1945–1947	Wix Garner
1948	Harold Ave
1949–1953	Vince DiFrancesca
1954–1956	Wes Stevens
1957–1959	Lou Saban
1960–1968	Art Dufelmeier
1969–1973	Darrell Mudra
1974–1975	Brodie Westen
1976–1978	Bill Shanahan
1979–1982	Pete Rodriguez
1983–1989	Bruce Craddock
1990–1998	Randy Ball
1999–2009	Don Patterson
2008–2012†	Mark Hendrickson
2013–2015	Bob Nielson
2016–2017	Charlie Fisher
2018–2021	Jared Elliott
2022–2023	Myers Hendrickson
2024–present	Joe Davis

† Acting head coach first seven games of 2008 season and last eight games of 2009 season.

== Season records ==
Year	Overall record	Conference record	Standing (Total teams)
1903	0–3	–	–
1904	5–2	–	–
1905	4–2	–	–
1906	1–4	–	–
1907	2–3	–	–
1908	2–3–1	–	–
1909	2–3	–	–
1910	4–1–1	–	–
1911	4–3	–	–
1912	4–3	–	–
1913	5–3	–	–
1914	3–2–1	0–1	T-14th (15)
1915	1–5	0–4	T-16th (28)
1916	1–7–1	0–5	T-18th (19)
1917	2–4	1–4	13th (18)
1918	No games played	N/A	N/A
1919	5–2	1–2	16th (19)
1920	0–3–1	0–2–1	T-17th (21)
1921	3–3–1	1–2	T-16th (23)
1922	6–2	2–1	T-6th (23)
1923	1–6–1	1–4–1	20th (23)
1924	4–3	3–3	8th (22)
1925	4–3–1	4–3–1	9th (22)
1926	4–3–1	4–3	8th (19)
1927	6–3–1	4–3–1	9th (16)
1928	2–3–3	2–3–2	14th (22)
1929	3–5^{[Note A]}	2–5	18th (23)
1930	4–4	3–4	15th (22)
1931	2–6	2–4	18th (22)
1932	4–2–1	4–2–1	7th (21)
1933	3–5	2–4	16th (21)
1934	5–3	4–2	T-6th (20)
1935	2–6	1–6	17th (20)
1936	3–2–2	3–2–1	T-7th (21)
1937	3–4–1	3–1–1	6th (21)
1938	6–2	2–1	4th (8)
1939	5–1–1	2–0–1	1st (5)
1940	1–6–1	0–3–1	4th (5)
1941	3–4–1	1–2–1	4th (5)
1942	5–0–2	3–0–1	1st (5)
1943	1–6	0–4	4th (5)
1944	0–8	0–4	4th (5)
1945	1–5–1	0–3–1	T-3rd (5)
1946	2–6	0–4	4th (5)
1947	4–4–1	0–4	4th (5)
1948	4–4	1–3	3rd (5)
1949	9–1	4–0	1st (5)
1950	7–1	4–1	2nd (7)
1951	7–1–1	4–1–1	2nd (7)
1952	7–2	5–1	2nd (7)
1953	8–2	5–1	2nd (7)
1954	6–1–3	3–1–2	3rd (7)
1955	5–4–1	2–3–1	T-4th (7)
1956	6–3	4–2	2nd (7)
1957	5–4	4–2	T-2nd (7)
1958	6–1–1	5–1	1st (7)
1959	9–0	6–0	1st (7)
1960	6–2	5–1	2nd (7)
1961	5–3	4–2	T-2nd (7)
1962	5–3	2–2	3rd (5)
1963	6–3	3–1	2nd (5)
1964	6–3	3–1	T-1st (5)
1965	4–5	2–2	3rd (5)
1966	1–7–1	1–2	3rd (4)
1967	2–6	1–2	T-3rd (4)
1968	2–7–1	1–2	T-3rd (4)
1969	8–2	3–0	1st (4)
1970	7–3	–	–
1971	8–2	–	–
1972	9–2	–	–
1973	7–4	–	–
1974	7–3	–	–
1975	5–4–1	–	–
1976	7–3	–	–
1977	3–7	–	–
1978	3–6–1	1–3–1	T-4th (6)
1979	3–8	1–4	5th (6)
1980	4–6	0–4	5th (5)
1981	5–6	2–1	2nd (4)
1982	2–8	0–3	4th (4)
1983	3–8	0–3	4th (4)
1984	6–4–1	0–2–1	4th (4)
1985	6–5	2–3	3rd (6)
1986	6–5	2–4	5th (7)
1987	7–4	5–1	2nd (7)
1988	10–2	6–0	1st (7)
1989	4–7	1–5	6th (7)
1990	3–8	3–3	5th (7)
1991	7–4–1	4–2	3rd (7)
1992	7–4	4–2	2nd (7)
1993	4–7	4–2	3rd (7)
1994	8–3	4–2	2nd (7)
1995	4–7	2–4	6th (7)
1996	9–3	3–2	2nd (6)
1997	11–2	6–0	1st (7)
1998	11–3	5–1	1st (7)
1999	7–4	2–4	4th (7)
2000	9–3	5–1	1st (7)
2001	5–5	4–3	4th (8)
2002	11–2	6–1	1st (8)
2003	9–4	5–2	3rd (8)
2004	4–7	2–5	5th (8)
2005	5–6	3–4	5th (8)
2006	5–6	2–5	6th (8)
2007	6–5	3–3	4th (7)
2008	6–5	4–4	4th (9)
2009	1–10	0–8	9th (9)
2010	8–5	5–3	2nd (9)
2011	2–9	1–7	9th (9)
2012	3–8	1–7	9th (10)
2013	4–8	2–6	9th (10)
2014	5–7	3–5	8th (10)
2015	7–6	5–3	5th (10)
2016	6–6	4–4	6th (10)
2017	8–4	5–3	4th (10)
2018	5–6	4–4	5th (10)
2019	1–11	1–7	10th (10)
2020	1–5	1–5	9th (10)
2021	2–9	2–6	11th (11)
2022	0–11	0–8	11th (11)
2023	0–11	0–8	11th (11)
2024	4–8	3–5	T-6th (9)
2025	4–8	3–5	T-6th (9)

^A. Adjusted record is 0–8 (3 wins vacated). After the season Western was forced to vacate their wins due to an ineligible player.

== Individual accomplishments ==
=== Award winners ===
- Walter Payton Award finalists
  Paul Singer – 1988 . . . 2nd
  Aaron Stecker – 1997...2nd
  Charles Tharp – 2000...8th
  Russ Michna – 2003...6th
  Herb Donaldson – 2007...13th
  Herb Donaldson – 2008...3rd
- Buck Buchanan Award
  James Milton – 1998
  Edgerton Hartwell – 2000
- Buck Buchanan Award finalists
  Cyron Brown – 1997...3rd
  Edgerton Hartwell – 1999...5th
  Lee Russell – 2002...6th
  Lee Russell – 2003...5th
  Jason Williams – 2008...4th
  Kyle Glazier – 2010...T-2nd
  Brett Taylor – 2016...7th
  Brett Taylor – 2017...2nd
  Darius Joiner – 2021...6th
- Eddie Robinson Award finalists
  Randy Ball – 1997...6th
  Randy Ball – 1998...5th
  Don Patterson – 2000...13th
  Don Patterson – 2002...3rd
  Mark Hendrickson – 2010...2nd

=== College Football Hall of Fame members ===
Name	Position	Years	Inducted	Ref.
Darrell Mudra	Coach	1969–1973	2000	

== Future non-conference opponents ==
Announced schedules as of August 21, 2026.

2026	2027	2028	2029	2030	2031
Northwestern (IA)	at Oklahoma State	at Purdue	at Murray State	at Northern Illinois	at Northwestern
Illinois State	Dayton		at Wyoming		Murray State
at Wisconsin	at Indiana State		Indiana State		
Morehead State	at Boise State		North Alabama		
at North Alabama					

== Notable former players ==
=== Notable alumni ===
- Jaelon Acklin
- Don Beebe
- David Bowens
- Fabien Bownes
- Sam Clemons
- Bryan Cox
- Booker Edgerson
- Larry Garron
- Don Greco
- Rodney Harrison
- Edgerton Hartwell
- Frisman Jackson
- Leroy Jackson
- William James
- Rob Lazeo
- Lance Lenoir
- Lamar McGriggs
- Russ Michna
- Red Miller
- Dennis Morgan
- J. R. Niklos
- Khalen Saunders
- Mike Scifres
- Rich Seubert
- Paul Singer
- Aaron Stecker
- John Teerlinck
- Marco Thomas
- Mike Wagner
- Jason Williams
- Frank Winters

== See also ==
- Western Illinois Leathernecks
- List of NCAA Division I FCS football programs
