= Morgan Park High School =

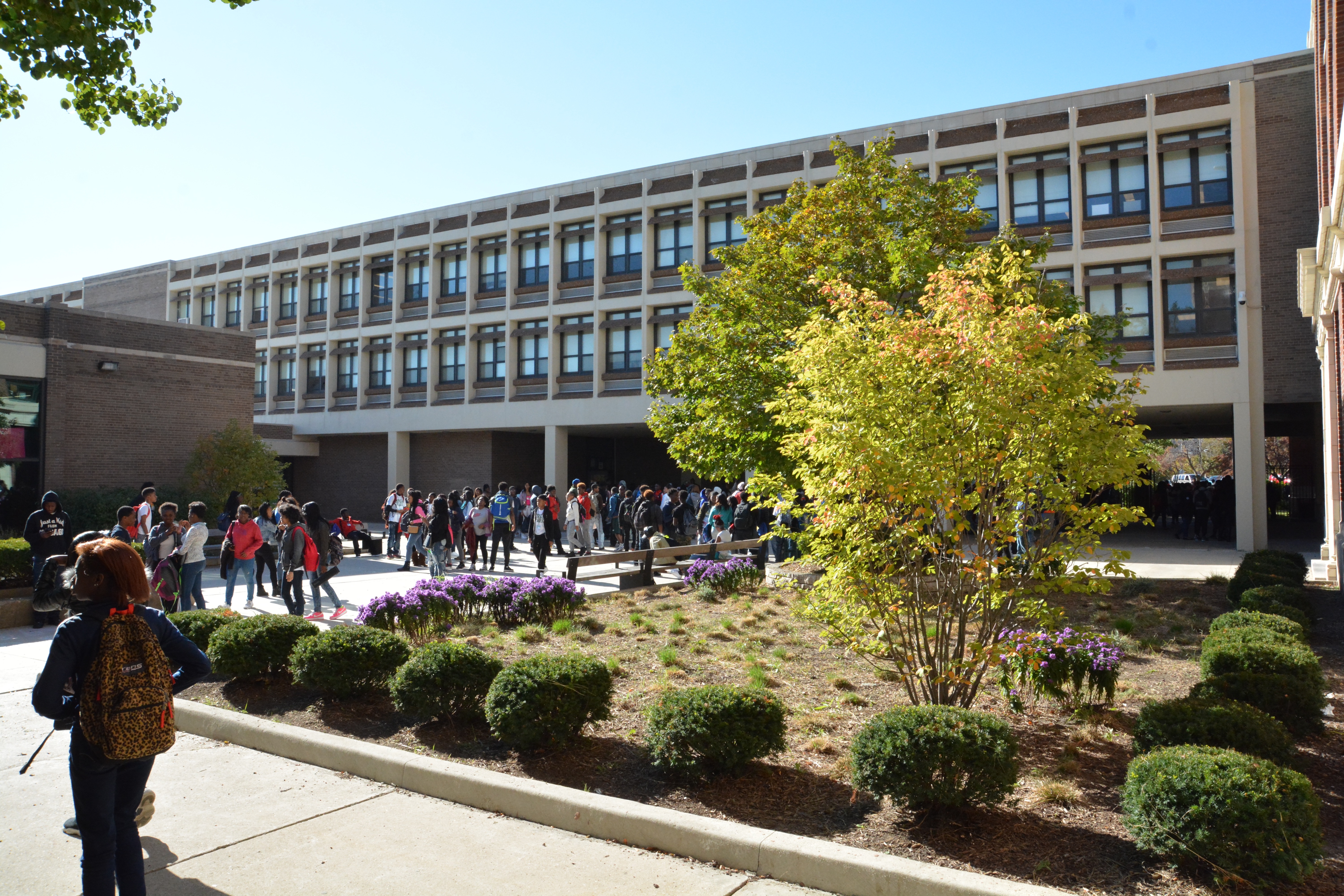
- Morgan Park High School c. 2016.

Location
- 1744 West Pryor Avenue; Chicago, Illinois 60643; United States; 41.6922°N 87.6654°W

Information
- School type: Public; Secondary; Middle
- Opened: 1916
- School district: Chicago Public Schools
- CEEB code: 141035
- Principal: Daniel Kuzma
- Teaching staff: 71.50 (on an FTE basis)
- Grades: 7–12
- Gender: Coed
- Enrollment: 1,160 (2022-23)
- Student to teacher ratio: 16.22
- Campus type: Urban
- Colors: Forest Green; White
- Song: "EMPEHI, EMPEHI, we are loyal"
- Athletics conference: Chicago Public League
- Mascot: Mustangs
- Accreditation: North Central Association of Colleges and Schools
- Newspaper: EMPEHI News
- Yearbook: Empehi
- Website: morganparkcps.org

Morgan Park High School is a four-year public high school and middle school located in the Morgan Park neighborhood on the far south side of Chicago, Illinois, United States. Opened in 1916, Morgan Park is a part of the Chicago Public Schools district. Morgan Park is located at the intersection of 111th Street and Vincennes Avenue.

== History ==
Illinois law required children up to age 14 to attend school and the Village of Morgan Park had established several grammar schools by the late 1800s, but high school was considered a luxury, and it was usually left to the parents to send their children to private schools. Morgan Park had a private school, the Morgan Park Academy, with a four-year program that accepted both boys and girls as students. However, around 1897, the Academy decided to only accept boys, so a public high school, especially for the girls, was needed.

Morgan Park High School opened its doors at its present location (1744 West Pryor Avenue) on January 17, 1916, but the high school was founded in 1902. Initially, space was rented in one of the grammar schools, the Western Avenue School that stood at about 110th St. and Western Ave., to use as classrooms for the first and second-year high school students. One or two teachers were employed, and the school started with 34 pupils. The third and fourth year students were sent to the high school in Blue Island.

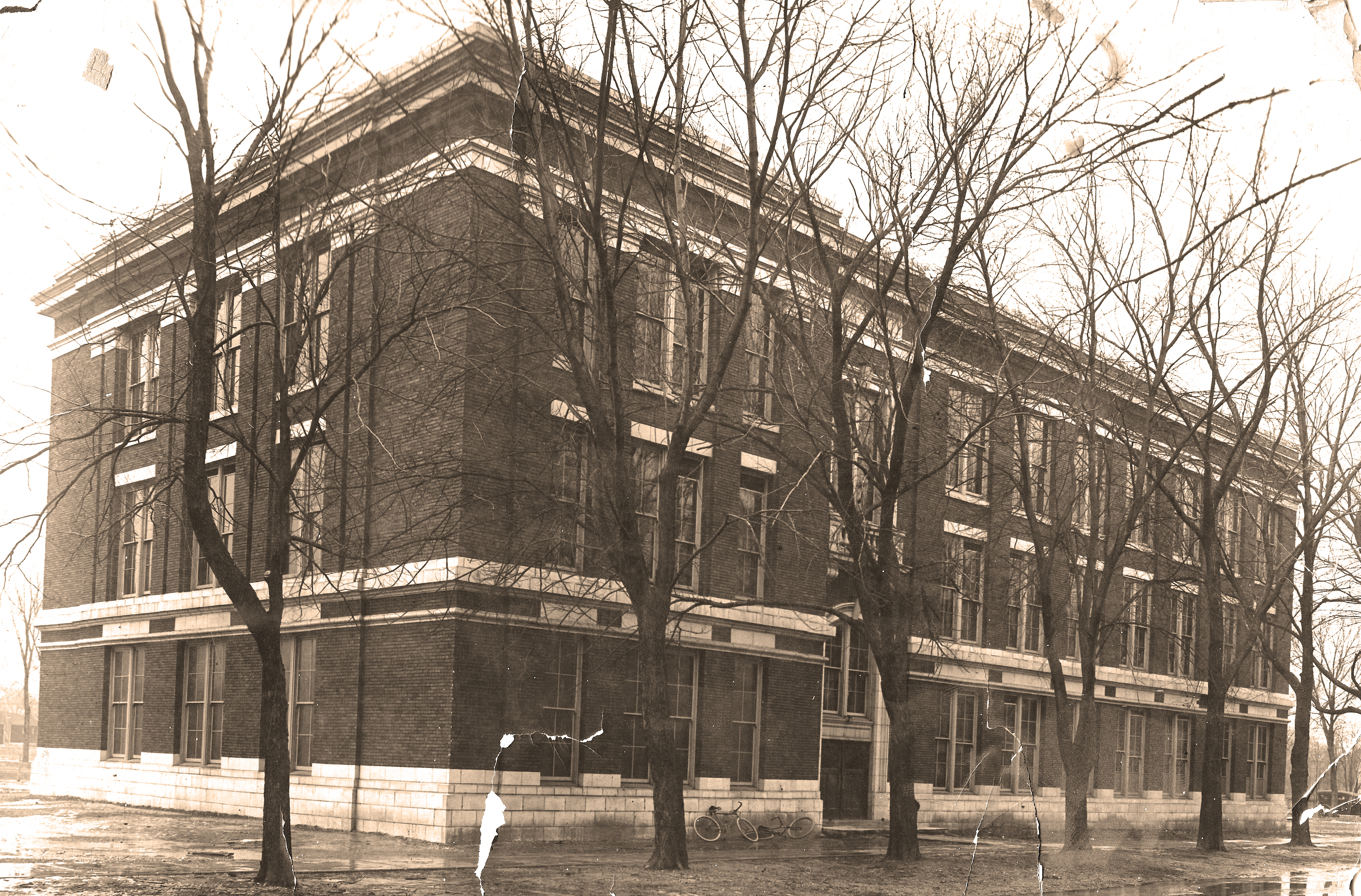
the Morgan Park High School building seen from South Vincennes Avenue, circa 1916.

Between 1904 and 1906, the Arlington School was built at 110th Place and Western Ave., which was the first building used solely by the school. Because of tax issues, the building was legally owned by the grammar school and rented to the high school. This was the situation in 1910 when the village of Morgan Park seriously considered the issue of annexation to Chicago, which meant giving up independence as a separate suburb and becoming part of the city. Some residents were concerned that Morgan Park would lose the high school because it did not have its own land and building.

Illinois law said that property set aside for schools at the time of annexation had to be used for that purpose. When it became evident that annexation would occur, Morgan Park raised the funds to buy land and begin building a high school. Annexation became reality in 1914, and the Morgan Park schools came under the jurisdiction of Chicago on April 24 of that year. It took another two years for the high school building to be completed, but finally, the doors opened in January 1916. A number of students who had dropped out were attracted by the opportunities of the new school and planned to re-enter. The first class graduated from the new high school on June 22, 1916. There were 37 four-year program graduates and six two-year program graduates. In the following decade, the school was expanded to include a Social Room, gymnasium, auditorium (Blackwelder Hall), pool, garages, and around 25 classrooms. The extra expansion was completed in 1926 and is located facing where Pryor Avenue once existed.

In 1934, over 2,000 Morgan Park students went on strike, protesting overcrowded conditions and the presence of African-American students in school classes, leaving only 140 students in class. Parents had met with the school superintendent demanding that classes be kept segregated. Eventually the strike was settled and the white students returned to the integrated school. Segregation became an issue again in 1945 when students at the school circulated a petition to have a separate building built for black students. Frank Sinatra visited the area to support integration during the strike and encourage the students to return to the school.

The school remained the same size through the early 1960s, despite an expanding student population which forced MP to utilize mobile units for additional classroom space, as well as housing the freshman class in Clissold Elementary and the sophomore class in Shoop Elementary. In an effort to accommodate the growing student body (which reached approximately 3,300 students in 1975), another addition was constructed, and a new building was opened in 1965. When construction of the new building began in 1964, Pryor Avenue was cut off from the exit on Vincennes Avenue; now it ends at the teachers parking lot on the west side of the school campus. Most of what is seen today on the school grounds was due to work completed by 1983.

In 1978, a re-development plan was proposed for Morgan Park. Not only was an expansion of the boys and girls south gymnasiums included, but various offices, science labs, a library, and even a separate swimming pool facility were hoped to be part of the project. Only part of the plan was realized. The tennis courts, parking lots, track and softball/baseball fields were built to create a true campus. Before construction began in 1981, houses that surrounded the school were purchased and then razed by the Board of Education.

== Academics ==
In 1983, Morgan Park High School instituted a World Language and International Baccalaureate Studies Program that also allows students to enroll from outside the school's attendance area. The addition of a 7th and 8th grade Academic Center component (first offered in 1983) allows advanced level students to begin earning high school credits and to study languages before 9th grade. Morgan Park High School offers both the IB Middle Years Programme and the IB Diploma Programme, and has been an International Baccalaureate Organization member school since 1999. Morgan Park was one of 11 schools nationwide selected by the College Board for inclusion in the EXCELerator "School Improvement Model" program beginning the 2006-2007 school year. The project was funded by the Bill & Melinda Gates Foundation. The decision to expand MP's existing IB program was officially made on December 18, 2013, during the monthly meeting of the Chicago Board of Education, when board members voted unanimously to add MP as a wall-to-wall school beginning next school year. For the 2014-2015 school year, Morgan Park was named the seventh high school in Chicago to become "wall-to-wall" International Baccalaureate (IB) Programme school. Freshman and sophomore-level students would now be in the IB Middle Years Programme (MYP) and could opt for admittance to the Diploma Programme for their junior and senior years.

The International Baccalaureate Career-related Programme (IBCP) is also offered. IBCP incorporates the values of the IB into a unique programme addressing the needs of students engaged in career-related education. CP students undertake a minimum of two IB Diploma Programme (DP) courses, an IB core course consisting of four college-preparatory components and a career-related study. Students are prepared for college academics and a career component.

== Athletics ==
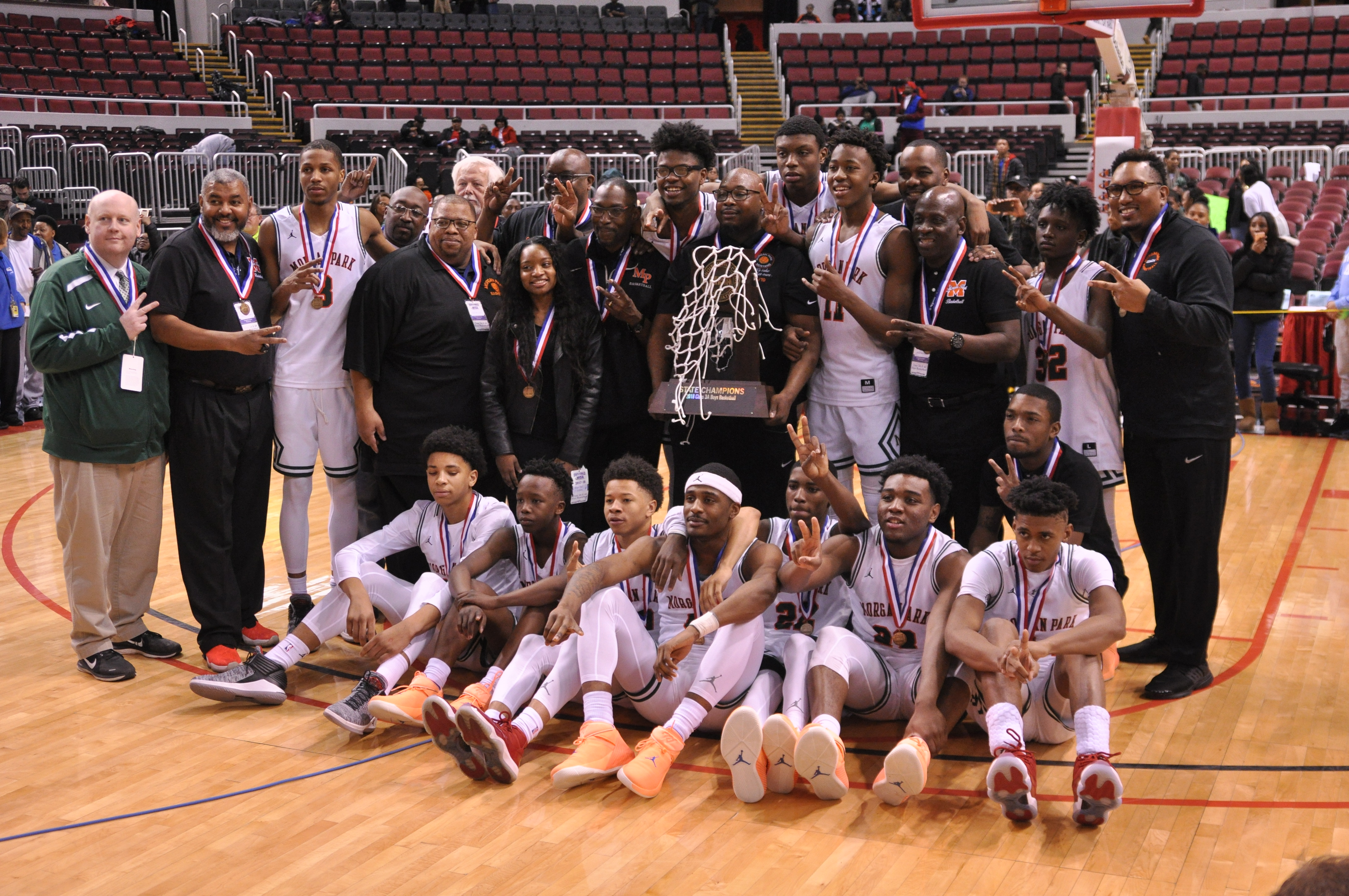
Varsity basketball team celebrate second straight IHSA Class 3A title victory, March 2018.

Morgan Park competes in the Chicago Public League (CPL) and is a member of the Illinois High School Association (IHSA). The school's sport teams are named the Mustangs. The boys' baseball team were regional champions three times (2013–14, 2014–15, 2015–16) and state semifinalists in 2014-15. The boys' basketball team have been regional champions nine consecutive years (2011-2019), public league champions 1973-74, 2000–01, 2009–10, and IHSA champions five times: 1975-76 (AA), 2012-13 (3A), 2013-14 (3A), 2016-17 (3A), 2017-18 (3A). The girls' basketball team were regional champions ten times (2003, 2010–14, 2016–19); they were state semifinalists in 2016. The boys' track and field team took 3rd place in state in 2016. The girls track and field team were state champions in 1994-1996 and 1999-2002, along with being state runners up in 1992, 1997–98, 2003–05, 2011, and 2015. The boys football won the Chicago Public League championship in 1971, 2001, 2005, and 2007, along with the Prep Bowl champion in 2005. The boys bowling team has won the Public League championship for the past six years (2014–19).

== Notable alumni ==
- BabyChiefDoit - rapper
- Lee Bernet – former offensive tackle who played professionally for the American Football League's Denver Broncos (1965–66)
- Wayne Blackshear (2011) – forward for the Louisville Cardinals
- James C. Bliss – inventor of the Optacon
- Da'Ron Brown – wide receiver for the Kansas City Chiefs
- Corbin Bryant – defensive end in the National Football League
- Kam Buckner – Democratic member of the Illinois House of Representatives
- Michael Colyar (1975) – actor and comedian (House Party 3, Martin)
- Ayo Dosunmu (2018) - NBA basketball player for the Minnesota Timberwolves
- Chris Durr Jr. (2024) – college football wide receiver for the Maryland Terrapins
- Aja Evans - Olympic bobsled Bronze medal 2014 and World Championships Bobsled Bronze medal 2017
- Fred Evans, defensive tackle who played for the Minnesota Vikings
- Marcus C. Evans Jr. – Democratic member of the Illinois House of Representatives
- Hugh Gallarneau – former NFL halfback who played from 1941–1942 and 1945–1947 for the Chicago Bears, who was inducted into the College Football Hall of Fame
- Frisman Jackson (1997) – former wide receiver for the Cleveland Browns and New York Jets
- Mae Jemison (1973) – physician and former NASA astronaut, and the first African-American woman in space
- Trezelle Jenkins – former offensive tackle who played for the Kansas City Chiefs from 1995 through 1997
- Jeremih – recording artist and producer
- Bob Kennedy – MLB player (Chicago White Sox, Cleveland Indians, Baltimore Orioles, Detroit Tigers, Brooklyn Dodgers) and Chicago Cubs manager and general manager
- Corey Mays (2001) – linebacker for the Kansas City Chiefs
- Adam Miller (2020) - 2020 Illinois Mr. Basketball
- Charlie Moore - 2016 Illinois Mr. Basketball
- George Piktuzis – MLB player (Chicago Cubs)
- Jeremy Rifkin (1963) – economist, writer and public speaker; founder of Foundation on Economic Trends
- Jacqueline B. Vaughn (1952) – teacher, first African-American and woman to head the nation's third largest teachers union local, Chicago Teachers Union
- Earl Washington (attended) – jazz pianist
- Holmes Daylie (1938) - Radio Announcer/ First African-American Radio Host on a Network (NBC) Station, WMAQ (AM) Rapper and rhyming DJ, Record producer for Ramsey Lewis Trio
- Johnny Washington (attended) – pitcher for the Chicago American Giants of the Negro leagues
- Bucky Irving (attended freshman year) - running back for the Tampa Bay Buccaneers
