= 1964 Eastern Illinois Panthers football team =

American college football season

1964 Eastern Illinois Panthers football
- Conference: Interstate Intercollegiate Athletic Conference
- Record: 3–6 (1–3 IIAC)
- Head coach: Ralph Kohl (8th season)
- Home stadium: Lincoln Field

1964 Interstate Intercollegiate Athletic Conference football standings
	Conf.					Overall
Team	W		L		T	W		L		T
Northern Illinois +	3	–	1	–	0	7	–	2	–	0
Western Illinois +	3	–	1	–	0	6	–	3	–	0
Illinois State	2	–	2	–	0	5	–	4	–	0
Central Michigan	1	–	3	–	0	4	–	5	–	0
Eastern Illinois	1	–	3	–	0	3	–	6	–	0
+ – Conference co-champions

The 1964 Eastern Illinois Panthers football team represented Eastern Illinois University as a member of the Interstate Intercollegiate Athletic Conference (IIAC) during the 1964 NCAA College Division football season. The team was led by eighth-year head coach Ralph Kohl and played their home games at Lincoln Field in Charleston, Illinois. The Panthers finished the season with a 3–6 record overall and a 1–3 record in conference play.

== Schedule ==
Date	Opponent	Site	Result	Attendance	Source
September 19	Indiana State*	Lincoln Field; Charleston, IL	L 14–25	3,436	
September 26	at Central State (OH)*	Wilberforce, OH	W 27–26		
October 3	Central Michigan	Lincoln Field; Charleston, IL	W 17–14	1,423	
October 10	Milwaukee*	Lincoln Field; Charleston, IL	L 7–8	708	
October 17	Illinois State^{†}	Lincoln Field; Charleston, IL (rivalry)	L 23–25	5,442	
October 24	at Northern Illinois	Glidden Field; DeKalb, IL	L 14–35	11,800	
October 31	Hillsdale*	Lincoln Field; Charleston, IL	L 14–41	1,028	
November 7	at Ferris State*	Top Taggart Field; Big Rapids, MI	W 27–6		
November 14	at Western Illinois	Hanson Field; Macomb, IL	L 14–30	6,200	
*Non-conference game; ^{†}Homecoming
