= Western Illinois Leathernecks men's basketball =

Men's college basketball team

2025–26 Western Illinois Leathernecks men's basketball team
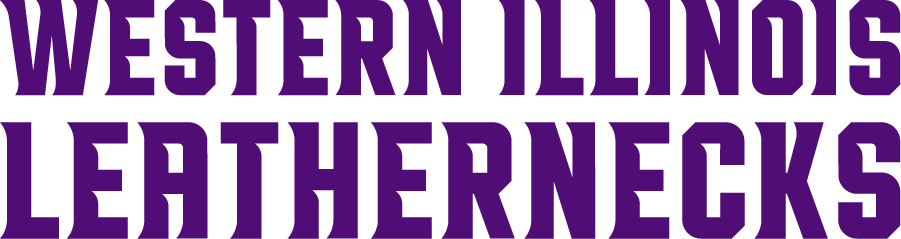
- University: Western Illinois University
- First season: 1904
- Athletic director: Paul Bubb
- Head coach: Chad Boudreau (3rd season)
- Location: Macomb, Illinois
- Arena: Western Hall (capacity: 5,139)
- Conference: Ohio Valley Conference
- Nickname: Leathernecks
- Colors: Purple and gold
- Student section: Purple Platoon
- All-time record: 557-789 (.414)

NCAA Division I tournament appearances
- 1959*, 1980*, 1981*

NAIA tournament runner-up
- 1954, 1958
Other NAIA tournament results
Semifinals	1954, 1955, 1958, 1962
Quarterfinals	1954, 1955, 1956, 1957, 1958, 1962
Appearances	1954, 1955, 1956, 1957, 1958, 1962, 1963

Conference tournament champions
- Mid-Cont: 1984

Conference regular-season champions
- Mid-Cont: 1983; Summit: 2013

Uniforms
Home	Away
- * at Division II level

The Western Illinois Leathernecks men's basketball team represents Western Illinois University of Macomb, Illinois, in National Collegiate Athletic Association (NCAA) Division I men's college basketball competition. As of the 2023–24 NCAA season, the Leathernecks compete in the Ohio Valley Conference.

== History ==
Western Illinois' first men's basketball team was fielded in 1904. The Leathernecks men's basketball program made the transition from Division II to Division I beginning in the 1981–82 season. They were selected to play in the College Basketball Invitational tournament following the 2011–12 regular season, the first Division I postseason appearance in school history. The Leathernecks were selected again to play in the College Basketball Invitational tournament after the 2012–13 season. The Leathernecks have never appeared in the NCAA Division I men's basketball tournament.

Prior to moving to Western Hall in 1964, the men's basketball team played at Hewitt Gymnasium and Peoria Armory from the early 1900s through the 1930s. They also played select home games at Robertson Memorial Field House during the 1970s.

== Season results ==
Western Illinois' records season by season since joining Division I in 1981.

Season	Head Coach	Overall	Conference	Standing	Postseason
Division I Independent
1981–82	Jack Margenthaler	14–13	2–2	–	–
Mid-Continent Conference
1982–83	Jack Margenthaler	20–11	9–3	1st of 8	–
1983–84	Jack Margenthaler	17–13	6–8	5th of 8	–
1984–85	Jack Margenthaler	14–14	10–4	2nd of 8	–
1985–86	Jack Margenthaler	13–15	7–7	T-4th of 8	–
1986–87	Jack Margenthaler	12–16	2–12	8th of 8	–
1987–88	Jack Margenthaler	15–12	6–8	5th of 8	–
1988–89	Jack Margenthaler	9–19	4–8	T-5th of 8	–
1989–90	Jack Margenthaler	16–13	6–6	T-3rd of 8	–
1990–91	Jack Margenthaler	13–15	6–10	T-6th of 9	–
1991–92	Jack Margenthaler	10–18	4–12	8th of 9	-
1992–93	Jim Kerwin	8–19	4–12	8th of 9	–
1993–94	Jim Kerwin	7–20	5–13	9th of 10	–
1994–95	Jim Kerwin	20–8	13–5	2nd of 10	–
1995–96	Jim Kerwin	17–12	12–6	2nd of 10	–
1996–97	Jim Kerwin	19–10	11–5	T-2nd of 9	–
1997–98	Jim Kerwin	16–11	11–5	T-3rd of 9	–
1998–99	Jim Kerwin	16–12	9–5	T-3rd of 9	–
1999–00	Jim Kerwin	8–22	3–13	T-9th of 9	–
2000–01	Jim Kerwin	5–23	5–11	T-T-7th of 9	-
2001–02	Jim Kerwin	12–16	3–11	7th of 8	–
2002–03	Jim Kerwin	7–21	3–11	7th of 8	–
2003–04	Derek Thomas	3–25	1–15	9th of 9	–
2004–05	Derek Thomas	11–14	7–9	T-5th of 9	–
2005–06	Derek Thomas	7–21	3–13	8th of 8	–
2006–07	Derek Thomas	7–23	3–11	7th of 8	–
Summit League
2007–08	Derek Thomas	12–18	7–11	7th of 10	–
2008–09	Jim Molinari	9–20	6–12	T-8th of 10	–
2009–10	Jim Molinari	13–17	6–12	T-6th of 10	–
2010–11	Jim Molinari	7–23	2–16	9th of 10	–
2011–12	Jim Molinari	18–15	9–9	4th of 10	CBI 1st Round
2012–13	Jim Molinari	22–9	13–3	T-1st of 9	CBI 1st Round
2013–14	Jim Molinari	10–20	4–10	7th of 8	–
2014–15	Billy Wright	8–20	3–13	9th of 9	
2015–16	Billy Wright	10–17	3–13	9th of 9	–
2016–17	Billy Wright	8–20	5–11	8th of 9	–
2017–18	Billy Wright	12–16	3–11	8th of 8	–
2018–19	Billy Wright	10–21	4–12	8th of 9	–
2019–20	Billy Wright	5–21	2–14	9th of 9	–
2020–21	Rob Jeter	7–15	5–9	7th of 9	–
2021–22	Rob Jeter	16–16	7–11	6th of 10	TBC 1st Round
2022–23	Rob Jeter	16–14	9–9	4th of 10	–
Ohio Valley Conference
2023–24	Chad Boudreau	21–12	13–5	4th of 11	–
2024–25	Chad Boudreau	12–19	6–14	10th of 11	–
2025–26	Chad Boudreau	5–26	1–19	11th of 11	–
Totals	45 Years 7 Coaches	595–846	308–432	2 Conf. Championships	3 Postseason Appearances

== Coaching history ==
Stats updated as of the end of the 2022–23 season

Coach	Career	Record
Lewis	1910–1911	0–5
Albert Walrath	1911–1914	4–7
E.S. Dowell	1914–1915	8–0
Erskine Jay	1915–1920	14–24
C.J. Roberts	1920–1921	4–6
Ray Haberman	1921–1922	5–8
Gerald Pugh	1922–1923	8–4
Howard Hawkes	1923–1926	30–9
Ralph Barclay	1926–1929	39–23
Ray Hanson	1929–1941	185–85
Wix Garner	1941–1942	4–7
Ralph Barclay	1942–1943	8–5
Bob Barnwell	1943–1946	24–22
Ray Hanson	1946–1947	13–10
Leroy "Stix" Morley	1947–1969	365–215
Guy Ricci	1969–1973	44–58
Walt Moore	1973–1977	46–57
Jack Margenthaler	1977–1992	221–202
Jim Kerwin	1992–2003	135–174
Derek Thomas	2003–2008	40–104
Jim Molinari	2008–14	79–104
Billy Wright	2014–2020	53–115
Rob Jeter	2020–2023	39–45
Chad Boudreau	2023–present	21–13
Totals	1,389–1,302	

== Postseason ==
=== CBI results ===
The Leathernecks have appeared in two College Basketball Invitationals. Their combined record is 0–2.

Year	Round	Opponent	Result
2012	First Round	Oregon State	L 59–80
2013	First Round	Purdue	L 67–81

=== The Basketball Classic results ===
The Leathernecks have appeared in The Basketball Classic one time. Their record is 0–1.

Year	Round	Opponent	Result
2022	First Round	UTEP	L 54–80

=== NCAA Division II Tournament results ===
The Leathernecks have appeared in three NCAA Division II Tournaments. Their combined record is 2–4.

Year	Round	Opponent	Result
1959	Regional Quarterfinals; Regional 3rd Place Game	Centenary; Abilene Christian	L 76–84; L 81–85 ^{OT}
1980	Regional Quarterfinals; Regional Finals	North Dakota; South Dakota State	W 102–79; L 86–98
1981	Regional Quarterfinals; Regional Finals	Southern Indiana; Northern Michigan	W 80–73; L 87–93

=== NAIA tournament results ===
The Leathernecks have appeared in seven NAIA tournaments. Their combined record is 18–7.

Year	Round	Opponent	Result
1954	First round Second round Quarterfinals; Semifinals; National championship	Morris Harvey; Southeastern State; SE Louisiana; SW Missouri State; St. Benedict's	W 84–68; W 79–74^{OT} W 84–79^{OT} W 78–75; L 56–62
1955	First round Second round Quarterfinals; Semifinals	Regis; NE Missouri State; Gustavus Adolphus; Southeastern State	W 76–60; W 86–85; W 50–49; L 61–68
1956	First round Second round Quarterfinals	Eastern New Mexico; Pacific Lutheran; Pittsburg State	W 114–87; W 72–67; L 76–83
1957	First round Second round Quarterfinals	Southern State (AR); William Jewell; Tennessee State	W 101–70; W 80–67; L 88–90
1958	First round Second round Quarterfinals; Semifinals; National championship	Georgia Teachers; Pasadena; Youngstown; Georgetown (KY); Tennessee State	W 74–62; W 83–80; W 70–67; W 86–81; L 73–85
1962	First round Second round Quarterfinals; Semifinals	Pratt Institute; St. Cloud State; Carson–Newman; Prairie View A&M	W 76–70; W 84–68; W 91–65; L 68–80
1963	First round	Miles	L 81–84

== Notable former players ==
- Eulis Báez, Overseas
- Ceola Clark III, Overseas
- Joe Dykstra, drafted by the Phoenix Suns
- Obi Emegano, Overseas
- Brandon Gilbeck, Overseas
- Kristjan Makke, Overseas
- Mike Miklusak, Overseas
- Al Miksis, National Basketball Association
- Terell Parks, basketball player in the Israeli Basketball Premier League

== See also ==
- NCAA Division I men's basketball tournament bids by school
- List of NCAA Division II men's basketball tournament bids by school
