= Howard Hawkes =

American football and basketball coach

- Hawkes pictured in Sequel 1923, Western Illinois yearbook

Biographical details
- Born: October 28, 1894; Windham, Maine, U.S.
- Died: May 15, 1970 (aged 75); South Windham, Maine, U.S.

Coaching career (HC unless noted)

Football
- 1922–1925: Western Illinois

Basketball
- 1923–1926: Western Illinois

Head coaching record
- Overall: 14–15–2 (football); 37–14 (basketball)

Howard George Hawkes (October 28, 1894 – May 15, 1970) was an American football and basketball coach. He served the head football coach at Western Illinois University in Macomb, Illinois for four seasons, from 1922 to 1925, compiling a record of 14–15–2. Hawkes was also the head basketball coach at Western Illinois from 1923 to 1926, tallying mark of 37–14.

A native of Windham, Maine, Hawkes graduated from Windham High School in 1911. He received his B.P.E. degree from International Y.M.C.A. College at Springfield, Massachusetts in 1923.

== Head coaching record ==
=== Football ===
Year	Team	Overall	Conference	Standing	Bowl/playoffs
Western Illinois Leathernecks (Illinois Intercollegiate Athletic Conference) (1922–1925)
1922	Western Illinois	5–3	2–1	6th	
1923	Western Illinois	1–6–1	1–4–1	T–19th	
1924	Western Illinois	4–3	3–3	T–10th	
1925	Western Illinois	4–3–1	4–3–1	T–9th	
Western Illinois:		14–15–2	10–11–9		
Total:		14–15–2			
