= Lee Bernet =

American football player (born 1944)

No. 74
- Position: Tight end

Personal information
- Born: January 24, 1944; Chicago, Illinois
- Listed height: 6 ft 2 in (1.88 m)
- Listed weight: 250 lb (113 kg)

Career information
- High school: Chicago (IL) Morgan Park
- College: Wisconsin

Career history
- Denver Broncos (1965–1966)
- Stats at Pro Football Reference

Lee Bernet (born January 24, 1944) is an American former college and professional American football player. An offensive tackle, he played college football at the University of Wisconsin–Madison and played professionally for the Denver Broncos in the American Football League's 1965 and 1966 seasons.

Bernet played high school football at Morgan Park High School in Chicago.

== See also ==
- List of American Football League players
