= Vaughn Occupational High School =

Location
- 4355 North Linder Avenue; Chicago, Illinois 60641; United States; 41.96025°N 87.76436°W

Information
- School type: Public; Secondary; Special Education
- Motto: "Remember At Vaughn, We Soar!"
- Established: 1968
- School district: Chicago Public Schools
- CEEB code: 140238
- Principal: Stephanie Anderson
- Grades: 9–12
- Gender: Coed
- Enrollment: 227 (2017–2018)
- Campus type: Urban
- Colors: Blue; Gold
- Mascot: Eagles
- Website: vaughnhs.org

Jacqueline B. Vaughn Occupational High School is a public four-year special education high school located in the Portage Park neighborhood on the north–west side of Chicago, Illinois, United States. Opened in 1968, The school is named for Chicago public schools special education teacher and Chicago Teachers Union president Jacqueline B. Vaughn (1935–1994). The school is a part of the Chicago Public Schools. The school serves students with disabilities in grade levels 9 through 12.

== Curriculum ==
In addition to serving students in grades 9 through 12, Vaughn allows eligible students to continue attending until age 22. The school provides programs for students with intellectual disabilities that include academic instruction and the development of life, occupational, and social skills. Instruction includes differentiated and hands-on approaches, the use of technology, and community-based learning.

== History ==
Vaughn Occupational High School opened in during the 1968–1969 school year as Occupational Center C, one of three new occupational high schools created by the Chicago Board of Education. The school's first location was in the Logan Square neighborhood at 2508 North Maplewood Avenue. In June 1975, The Board of Education renamed the school Orlando W. Wilson Occupational High School after Chicago Police commissioner O. W. Wilson who had passed three years prior.

The school relocated to the Mayfair neighborhood on the north side at 4626 North Knox Avenue, sharing the campus with Mayfair Junior College in 1978. During the 1981–1982 school year, the school was moved again to the Jefferson Park neighborhood; occupying Beaubien Elementary School's third floor. By 1988, Enrollment grew at the school which caused overcrowding. In 1992, the school moved into its present location donated by The Illinois Bell Telephone Company to the Chicago Public Schools. The school was renamed after Jacqueline Barbra Vaughn by the Chicago Board of Education on April 1, 1993.
