= Jacqueline B. Vaughn =

Chicago Public Schools special education teacher and labor leader

- Vaughn in her office at the Chicago Teachers' Union headquarters in 1984

President of the Chicago Teachers Union
- In office August 1, 1984 – January 1994
- Preceded by: Robert Healy
- Succeeded by: Thomas H. Reece

Vice–President of the Chicago Teachers Union
- In office August 1972 – August 1, 1984

President of the Illinois Federation of Teachers
- In office 1989–1994

Personal details
- Born: Jacqueline Barbara Robinson; July 27, 1935 St. Louis, Missouri, U.S.
- Died: January 22, 1994 (aged 58) Chicago, Illinois, U.S.
- Cause of death: Breast cancer
- Spouses: Theodore Wright (divorced) Robert H. Vaughn (m. 1968)
- Education: Morgan Park High School
- Alma mater: Chicago Teachers College (now known as Chicago State University)
- Occupation: Special Education Teacher; labor leader

Jacqueline Barbara Vaughn (née Robinson; July 27, 1935 – January 22, 1994) was an American Chicago Public Schools special education teacher and labor leader. Vaughn is noted as the first African-American and first woman to serve as president of the Chicago Teachers Union, the nation's third largest teachers union local from August 1984 until her death in January 1994.

Vaughn served as President of the Illinois Federation of Teachers (1989–1994), and Vice–President of the American Federation of Teachers (1974–1994). Vaughn led what has been called one of the "mightiest teachers unions in the nation." Vaughn was famous for her fashion sense and her no-nonsense negotiation style in contract talks. Her ability to build consensus between the leadership team, the teachers and school support staff garnered respect from those in and out of the educational system. Vaughn spent much of her career trying to reform the educational system. Through her vision, the CTU Quest Center was created to give school professionals a place to design more effective teaching methods and student learning techniques. Chicago Mayor Richard M. Daley called Vaughn "a courageous and tireless champion for men and women working in our most noble profession, teaching."

== Biography ==
=== Early life and education ===
Born Jacqueline Barbara Robinson on July 27, 1935, in St. Louis, Missouri, to Mandella Robinson. Vaughn moved to Chicago after both parents died at an early age. Vaughn was raised by an aunt, Alice Bibbs, a first grade teacher within the Chicago Public Schools district. Vaughn was influenced by Bibbs to enter a career as a teacher. Vaughn attended Schoop Elementary School and was classmates with Emil Jones. For high school, Vaughn attended Morgan Park High School; graduating in 1952. After high school, Vaughn attended and graduated from Chicago Teachers College (now known as Chicago State University) in 1956. Vaughn later earned her master's degree in Special Education in 1964.

=== Career ===
After graduating from Chicago Teachers College, Vaughn worked various teaching assignments before becoming a special education teacher at Bousfield Elementary School in the Grand Crossing neighborhood. After several years at Bousfield teaching first, second grade and special education; Vaughn was recruited to head the special education department by the principal of the then-new Einstein Elementary School in the Bronzeville neighborhood. After five years at Einstein, Vaughn became a language arts specialist within the Chicago Public Schools district.

==== Chicago Teachers Union ====
Having been a member of the Chicago Teachers' Union since 1956, Vaughn quickly rose through the ranks of the Chicago Teachers Union. Vaughn served as a union delegate from 1957 until 1961, field representative from 1961 until 1963 and Elementary Functional Vice President from 1963 until 1968. Vaughn was elected to executive leadership in the union as recording secretary under then President, John Desmond in 1968. During her time as recording secretary, Vaughn studied the subtleties of negotiating at the University of Wisconsin at the urging of Desmond. In August 1972, Vaughn was elected to serve as CTU's vice-president, serving under president Robert Healey. Vaughn held the post for twelve years. Vaughn was elected the union's president by the union's House of Delegates in August 1984, earning a yearly salary of $52,000. Vaughn became one of Chicago's most visible union leaders during her tenure as CTU president, making regular appearances on the nightly news voicing the concerns and interests of both teachers and students during difficult negotiations with the Chicago School Board.

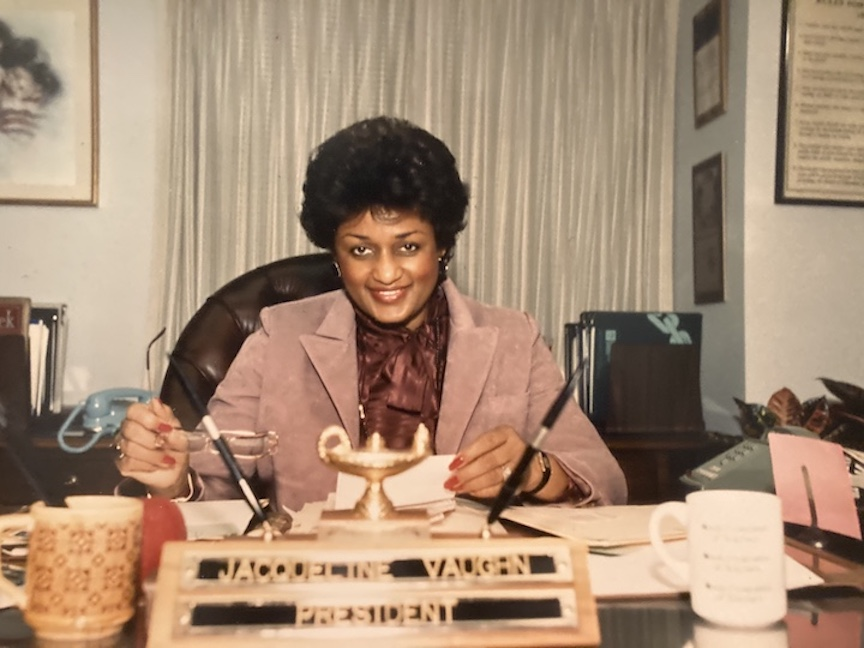
Vaughn in her office at the Chicago Teachers' Union headquarters, 1988.

==== Strikes ====
Between 1969 and 1987 the union authorized nine strikes to improve educational conditions. Vaughn lead teacher strikes four times during her tenure as union president, 1984 (10 days), 1985 (2 days) and most notably 1987 (19 days). The strike in 1987 lasted 4 weeks, from September 8 to October 4 and resulted in a pay increase for teachers and reductions in class size. It was the longest strike in Chicago history. Vaughn once said "I think that teacher's strikes should not have to occur, but just as it is for other workers, the strike is the ultimate weapon when there's a total breakdown in the negotiating process."

=== Personal life, health and death ===
Vaughn married twice and had one son, Karl Theodore Wright born in 1961 during her marriage to Theodore Wright. In 1968, she married Robert H. Vaughn Jr., international vice president of the United Food and Commercial Workers; whom she was still married to at the time of her death.

Vaughn began to struggle with her health in the early 1990s, later being diagnosed with breast cancer in September 1991. Vaughn kept her health battle private from the public, with only a few close relatives and friends knowing. Shortly thereafter, Vaughn began treatment and her cancer was in remission. In June 1993, News began to spread about Vaughn's diagnosis but she refused to elaborate on the issue when asked. By December 1993, Vaughn's condition began to deteriorate when the cancer began to spread throughout her body. During this time, Vaughn had lost a significant amount of weight, unable to eat and had trouble breathing.

Vaughn died in the early morning hours on January 22, 1994, at Michael Reese Hospital and Medical Center with her son at her bedside, at age 58. On January 26, 1994, thousands, including politicians and public figures, attended a homegoing service held for Vaughn at Pilgrim Baptist Church in the Douglas neighborhood on the south side of Chicago.

=== Legacy ===
==== CTU Quest Center ====
In 1992, Under Vaughn's direction the Chicago Teachers Union became the first labor organization to receive a $1 million grant from the MacArthur Foundation to fund the CTU Quest Center. The center provides teachers and paraprofessionals with continuous learning opportunities that can help improve teaching and student learning.

==== Honors ====
On April 1, 1993, Wilson High School on the northwest side of Chicago was renamed Jacqueline B. Vaughn Occupational High School after the former special education teacher and labor leader. The school provides students in special education with practical skills to become a viable part of the greater community. On March 11, 1998, Roosevelt Road in the south Loop area of downtown Chicago between The Dan Ryan Expressway and Museum Plaza by the city's lakefront was officially renamed Honorary Jacqueline B. Vaughn Way. In 2002, The Jacqueline B. Vaughn Graduate School of Teachers Leadership, a graduate school located in downtown Chicago was founded in her honor.
