= Ceola Clark III =

American basketball player (born 1989)

Free agent
- Position: Point guard

Personal information
- Born: January 13, 1989 (age 37) Waukegan, Illinois
- Listed height: 6 ft 3 in (1.91 m)
- Listed weight: 190 lb (86 kg)

Career information
- High school: Warren (Gurnee, Illinois)
- College: Western Illinois (2008–2013)
- NBA draft: 2013: undrafted
- Playing career: 2013–present

Career history
- 2013–2014: Sigal Prishtina
- 2014–2016: Tajfun

Career highlights
- ETC Superleague (2014); IPKO Cup (2014); Telemach League (2015)

Ceola Clark III (born January 13, 1989) is an American professional basketball player who last played for Tajfun of the Liga Nova KBM. He played college basketball for the Western Illinois University.

== College years ==
Clark III played collegiate basketball six years for the Western Illinois University.

=== College statistics ===
Year	Team	GP	GS	MPG	FG%	3P%	FT%	RPG	APG	SPG	BPG	PPG
2008–09	Western Illinois	29	5	26.1	.517	.477	.782	3.2	2.5	1.7	0.0	7.7
2009–10	Western Illinois	27	23	35.5	.471	.406	.750	5.0	3.2	2.7	0.2	14.2
2010–11	Western Illinois	6	6	34.2	.411	.313	.727	3.3	5.0	2.3	0.2	10.7
2011–12	Western Illinois	32	32	37.4	.449	.462	.733	3.6	4.7	1.6	0.1	13.3
2012–13	Western Illinois	30	30	35.6	.426	.415	.820	3.3	4.1	1.9	0.1	12.5
Career		124	96	33.8	.462	.435	.769	3.7	3.7	2.0	0.1	11.9

== Professional career ==
After going undrafted in the 2013 NBA draft, Clark III signed with Sigal Prishtina of the ETC Superleague for the 2013–14 season. On 11 September 2014, Clark signed a one-year deal with the Slovenian team KK Šentjur. He is a great 3 point shooter, he won the All star 3pt contest in Slovenia.
