= Erskine Jay =

American football and baseball coach

Biographical details
- Born: March 3, 1885; Beetown, Wisconsin, U.S.
- Died: August 17, 1970 (aged 85); Eau Claire, Wisconsin, U.S.

Coaching career (HC unless noted)

Football
- 1915–1919: Western Illinois

Baseball
- 1916–1917: Western Illinois

Erskine LaVerne Jay (March 3, 1885 – August 17, 1970) was an American football and baseball coach. He served as the head football coach (1913–1919) and head baseball (1916–1917) coach at Western Illinois State Normal School (now known as Western Illinois University). He was also on the school's faculty as an instructor in geography and physical training.
