= Gary Lagesse =

American athletic director and softball coach

- Born: 28 May 1953 (age 72)
- Occupations: Athletic director, softball coach, team advisor, sporting goods sales representative
- Years active: 1977–2011 (coaching and athletic administration)
- Awards: Illinois High School Association Coaches Hall of Fame (2002)

Gary Lagesse (born May 28, 1953) is a former athletic director, head softball coach, team advisor and current sporting goods sales representative. He served as the head softball coach for Thornwood High School from 1977 until 2006, winning State Championships in 1990, 1991 and 1998. He founded and operated the Illinois Outlaws travel softball program where he won the Amateur Softball Association 18U National Championship in 2008. He holds a career record at the varsity level of 694 wins and 301 losses. Upon retirement, Lagesse held the Illinois state record for most wins by a head coach in softball. Lagesse was inducted into the Illinois High School Association Coaches Hall of Fame in 2002. Lagesse retired as the athletic director at Thornwood in 2011 after serving in the role for 35 years.

While coaching, Lagesse's teams were sometimes compared to the 1970's Pittsburgh Pirates due to their strikingly similar uniforms combined with their productive hitting. At the same time, Lagesse was described as scheduling difficult opponents for his team.

Lagesse attended Beecher High School and Western Illinois University where he graduated with a degree in education in 1976.
