= Frisman Jackson =

American football player and coach (born 1979)

Seattle Seahawks
- Title: Wide receivers coach

Personal information
- Born: June 12, 1979 (age 47); Chicago, Illinois, U.S.
- Listed height: 6 ft 3 in (1.91 m)
- Listed weight: 217 lb (98 kg)

Career information
- Position: Wide receiver (No. 88, Browns; No. 19, Jets*)
- High school: Morgan Park (Chicago)
- College: Northern Illinois (1997–1999; No. 12); Western Illinois (2000–2001; No. 7)
- NFL draft: 2002: undrafted

Career history

Playing
- Cleveland Browns (2002–2006); New York Jets (2007)*
- * Offseason or practice squad member only

Coaching
- Western Illinois (2008–2009) Wide receivers coach; Akron (2010–2011) Wide receivers coach; Northern Illinois (2012) Wide receivers coach; NC State (2013–2014) Wide receivers coach; Temple (2015–2016) Wide receivers coach & passing game coordinator; Tennessee Titans (2017) Wide receivers coach; Baylor (2018–2019) Wide receivers coach; Carolina Panthers (2020–2021) Wide receivers coach; Pittsburgh Steelers (2022–2023) Wide receivers coach; Seattle Seahawks (2024–present) Wide receivers coach

Awards and highlights
- Super Bowl champion (LX)

Career NFL statistics
- Receptions: 40
- Receiving yards: 490
- Receiving touchdowns: 1
- Stats at Pro Football Reference

Frisman Jackson (born June 12, 1979) is an American professional football coach and former player who is the wide receivers coach for the Seattle Seahawks of the National Football League (NFL). He previously served as a wide receivers coach at Baylor, Temple, NC State, Northern Illinois, Akron, and Western Illinois. Jackson also previously served as a wide receivers coach for the Tennessee Titans, Carolina Panthers, and Pittsburgh Steelers. He played college football for the Western Illinois Leathernecks and signed as an undrafted free agent with Cleveland Browns in 2002.

== Early life ==
Jackson, a South Side Chicago native, played high school football at Morgan Park High School on Chicago, where he played football, basketball, baseball, and ran track. He was an All-City and All-State quarterback in 1997. Jackson is considered by many to be one of the best quarterbacks in the history of the Chicago Public League.

== Playing career ==
=== College ===
Jackson is considered to be one of the best wide receivers to play at Western Illinois University. He holds single-game school records for both receptions (14) and yards (286). During his college career he was also the team's starting quarterback through his junior year, where he holds the school's single-game rushing record among quarterbacks, with 109 yards. As a senior wide receiver, he caught 55 balls for 1,047 yards.

Prior to playing at Western, Jackson was enrolled at Northern Illinois University as a quarterback. In 1997, Jackson became the first true freshman to start a football game at NIU since 1979 when he started against Kansas State, and he would go on to start 7 more games that year.

=== National Football League ===
==== Cleveland Browns ====
In 2002, he was signed by the Cleveland Browns as an undrafted free agent out of Western Illinois University. Jackson played in five NFL seasons from 2002 to 2006 for the Cleveland Browns. Had 40 career catches for 490 yards and 1 touchdown.

==== New York Jets ====
In January 2007 he signed as a free agent with the New York Jets, but was released shortly before the season began.

== Coaching career ==
=== Western Illinois ===
In 2008, Jackson began his coaching career as a wide receivers coach at Western Illinois University.

=== Akron ===
In 2010, Jackson was hired as a wide receivers coach at the University of Akron.

=== Northern Illinois ===
In 2012, Jackson was hired as a wide receivers coach at Northern Illinois University.

=== NC State ===
In 2013, Jackson was hired as a wide receivers coach at North Carolina State University.

=== Temple ===
In 2015, Jackson was hired as a wide receivers coach at Temple University.

=== Tennessee Titans ===
In January 2017, Jackson was hired by the Tennessee Titans as their wide receivers coach under head coach Mike Mularkey.

=== Baylor ===
In 2018, Jackson was hired as a wide receivers coach at Baylor University.

=== Carolina Panthers ===
On January 16, 2020, Jackson was hired by the Carolina Panthers as their wide receivers coach, reuniting with head coach Matt Rhule.

=== Pittsburgh Steelers ===
On February 8 the Pittsburgh Steelers hired Jackson as their Wide Receivers coach.

=== Seattle Seahawks ===
Under Jackson's coaching, receiver Jaxon Smith-Njigba had a breakout year in 2025 where he set franchise records in receptions (119) and yards (1,793) as well as winning Offensive Player of the Year.

He was part of the coaching staff that won Super Bowl LX over the New England Patriots 29–13.

== Personal life ==
Jackson earned undergraduate and master's degrees from Western Illinois University. He and his wife Lindsey, also a Western Illinois University grad, have two kids.
