= List of lakes of Oakland County, Michigan =

List of lakes

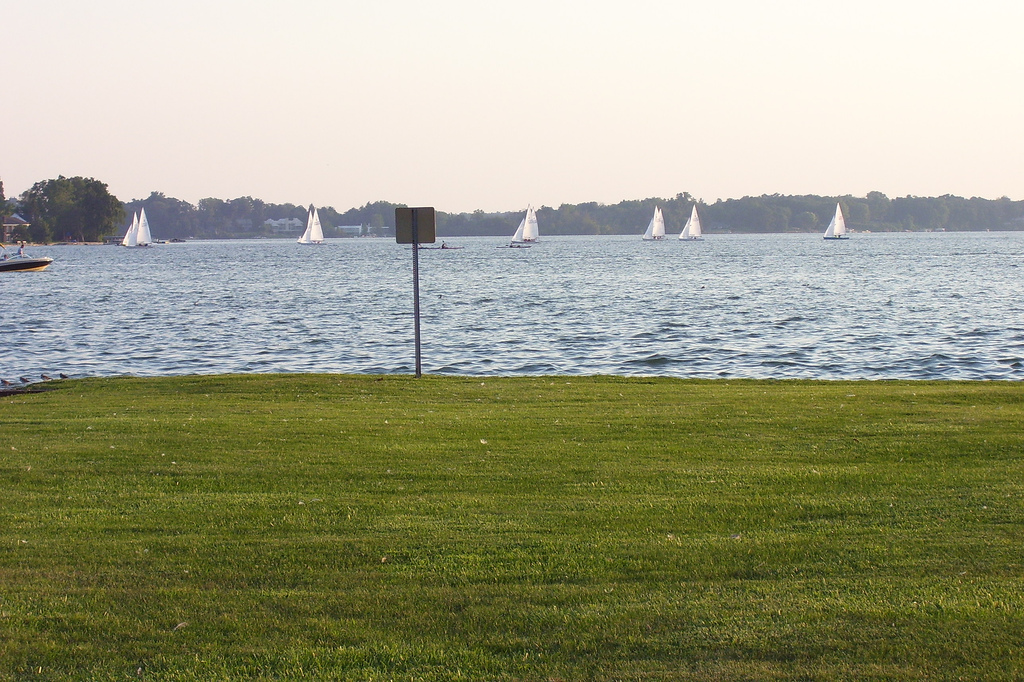
Cass Lake, the largest and deepest lake in Oakland County

There are 387 lakes in Oakland County, Michigan. Of those lakes, 317 are named while 70 are unnamed lakes.

== List ==
| Name | Location | Size (acre) | Size (ha) | Depth (ft) | Depth (m) | Notes |
|---|---|---|---|---|---|---|
| Adams Lake | Orion Township | | | | | |
| Alderman Lake | Highland Township | 19.6 | 7.9 | 28 | 9 | |
| Algoe Lake | Springfield Township | 1.8 | 0.7 | 13 | 4 | |
| Allen Lake | Springfield Township | | | | | |
| Bailey Lake | Independence Township | | | | | |
| Baldwin Lake | Waterford Township | 9 | 4 | 10 | 3 | |
| Baker Lake | Rose Township | | | | | |
| Bald Eagle Lake | Brandon Township | 125 | 51 | 26 | 8 | |
| Bass Lake | Milford Township | | | | | |
| Beaty Lake | Highland Township | | | | | |
| Bevins Lake | Holly Township | | | | | |
| Bloat Lake | Springfield Township | | | | | |
| Big Lake | Springfield Township | | | | | |
| Big School Lot Lake | Rose Township | | | | | |
| Big Seven Lake | Holly Township | | | | | |
| Bogie Lake | White Lake Township | | | | | |
| Brendel Lake | Highland Township | | | | | |
| Bridge Lake | Brandon Township | | | | | |
| Buckell Lake | Springfield Township | | | | | |
| Buckhorn Lake | Orion Township | | | | | |
| Buckhorn Lake | Rose Township | | | | | |
| Buhl Lake | Orion Township | | | | | |
| Bunny Run Lake | Orion Township | | | | | |
| Bush Lake | Holly Township | | | | | |
| Carpenter Lake | Orion Township | | | | | |
| Carroll Lake | Commerce Township | | | | | |
| Carter Lake | Rochester Hills | 38 | 15 | 25 | 7.6 | Located within Thelma G. Spencer Park |
| Carus Lake | Commerce Township | | | | | |
| Cass Lake | West Bloomfield Township | 1,280 | 518 | 123 | 37 | Deepest and largest lake in the county |
| Cedar Lake | Brandon Township | | | | | |
| Cedar Lake | Oxford Township | | | | | |
| Cedar Island Lake | White Lake Township | | | | | |
| Charlick Lake | Highland Township | | | | | |
| Chase Lake | Highland Township | | | | | |
| Chestnut Lake | Rochester Hills | | | | | |
| Childs Lake | Milford Township | | | | | |
| Clam Lake | Waterford Township | 21 | 8 | 10 | 3 | |
| Clam Lake | Orion Township | | | | | |
| Clark Lake | Commerce Township | | | | | |
| Clear Lake | Oxford Township | | | | | |
| Cogger Lake | Highland Township | | | | | |
| Colley Lake | Commerce Township | | | | | |
| Clear Lake | Oxford Township | | | | | |
| Commerce Lake | Commerce Township | 236 | | | | |
| Cooley Lake | White Lake Township | 86 | 35 | 55 | 17 | |
| Cranberry Lake | Independence Township | | | | | |
| Cranberry Lake | Orion Township | | | | | |
| Cranberry Lake | Milford Township | | | | | |
| Cranberry Lake | Brandon Township | | | | | |
| Crescent Lake | Waterford Township | 90 | 36 | 40 | 12 | |
| Cogger Lake | Rose Township | | | | | |
| Crooked Lake | Independence Township | 68 | 28 | 65 | 20 | |
| Crotched Lake | Springfield Township | | | | | |
| Crystal Lake | Pontiac | 12 | 5 | 11 | 3 | |
| Crystal Lake | Rochester Hills | | | | | |
| Darby Lake | Commerce Township | | | | | |
| Dark Lake (near Deer Lake) | Independence Township | 5 | 2 | 10 | 3 | One of two lakes with this name in this location |
| Dark Lake (near Whipple Lake) | Independence Township | 7 | 3 | 12 | 4 | One of two lakes with this name in this location |
| Dark Lake | Oxford Township | | | | | |
| Davis Lake | Oxford Township | | | | | |
| Deer Lake | Independence Township | 137 | 55 | 63 | 19 | |
| Dixie Lake | Springfield Township | | | | | |
| Dollar Lake | Independence Township | 3 | 1 | 15 | 5 | |
| Downey Lake | Highland Township | | | | | |
| Drake Lake | Springfield Township | | | | | |
| Duck Lake | Highland Township | | | | | |
| Duck Lake | Oxford Township | | | | | |
| Dunham Lake | Highland Township | | | | | |
| Eagle Lake | Waterford Township | 19 | 8 | 20 | 6 | |
| Ekelund Lake | Brandon Township | | | | | |
| Eliza Lake | Springfield Township | | | | | |
| Elizabeth Lake | Waterford Township | 363 | 147 | 72 | 22 | |
| Elkhorn Lake | Orion Township | | | | | |
| Elliott Lake | Rose Township | | | | | |
| Emerald Lake | Rochester Hills | | | | | |
| Erwin Lake | Orion Township | | | | | |
| Esler Lake | Highland Township | | | | | |
| Fagan Lake | Springfield Township | | | | | |
| Fair Lake | White Lake Township | | | | | |
| Fiddle Lake | Waterford Township | 9 | 4 | 10 | 3 | |
| Fish Lake | Highland Township | | | | | |
| Fish Lake | Oxford Township | | | | | |
| Fish Lake | Rose Township | | | | | |
| Flanders Lake | Commerce Township | | | | | |
| Flemings Lake | Independence Township | | | | | |
| Foster Lake | Independence Township | | | | | |
| Fox Lake | Commerce Township | | | | | |
| Gallagher Lake | Milford Township | | | | | |
| Galloway Lake | Auburn Hills | | | | | |
| Geneva Lake | Waterford Township | 19 | 8 | 35 | 11 | |
| Gilbert Lake | Bloomfield Township | | | | | |
| Gourd Lake | Highland Township | | | | | |
| Graham Lake | Orion Township | | | | | |
| Grampian Lake | Orion Township | | | | | |
| Grass Lake | Highland Township | | | | | |
| Grass Lake | Brandon Township | | | | | |
| Green Lake | Brandon Township | | | | | |
| Green Lake | Commerce Township | | | | | |
| Green Lake | Rose Township | | | | | |
| Greens Lake | Independence Township | 117 | 47 | 55 | 17 | |
| Greens Lake | Oxford Township | | | | | |
| Gulick Lake | Independence Township | | | | | |
| Halstead Lake | Springfield Township | | | | | |
| Hammond Lake | West Bloomfield Township | | | | | |
| Handsome Lake | Orion Township | | | | | |
| Hartwig Lake | Springfield Township | | | | | |
| Harvey Lake | Highland Township | | | | | |
| Haven Hill Lake | Highland Township | | | | | |
| Hawk Lake | Commerce Township | | | | | |
| Heart Lake | Orion Township | | | | | |
| Heather Lake | Orion Township | | | | | |
| Hidden Lake | Lyon Township | | | | | |
| Highland Lake | Highland Township | | | | | |
| Hogback Lake | Springfield Township | | | | | |
| Honeywell Lake | Milford Township | | | | | |
| Horseshoe Lake | Oxford Township | | | | | |
| Horton Lake | Springfield Township | | | | | |
| Heron Lake | Holly Township | | | | | |
| Holdridge Lake | Springfield Township | | | | | |
| Honeywell Lake | Milford Township | | | | | |
| Horseshoe Lake | Oxford Township | | | | | |
| Horton Lake | Springfield Township | | | | | |
| Howell Lake | Oxford Township | | | | | |
| Huckleberry Lake | Springfield Township | | | | | |
| Huff Lake | Brandon Township | | | | | |
| Hummer Lake | Oxford Township | | | | | |
| Huntoon Lake | Waterford Township | 43 | 17 | 15 | 5 | |
| Indian Lake | Orion Township | | | | | |
| Indianwood Lake | Oxford Township | | | | | |
| Judah Lake | Orion Township | | | | | |
| Kelly Lake | Rose Township | | | | | |
| Kennedy Lake | Holly Township | | | | | |
| Kent Lake | Milford Township | 1,200 | 486 | 36 | 11 | |
| Kenyon Lake | Rose Township | | | | | |
| Kirby Lake | Springfield Township | | | | | |
| Knox Lake | Independence Township | | | | | |
| Lacy Lake | Springfield Township | | | | | |
| Lakeville Lake | Addison Township | | | | | |
| Lake Anadale | Rochester Hills | | | | | |
| Lake Angelus | Auburn Hills | 477 | 193 | 88 | 27 | |
| Lake Braemar | Rose Township | | | | | |
| Lake Charnwood | Rochester Hills | | | | | |
| Lake Erin | Orion Township | | | | | |
| Lake George | Orion Township | | | | | |
| Lake Goodrich | Waterford Township | 4 | 2 | 10 | 3 | |
| Lake Hope | Springfield Township | | | | | |
| Lake Lahring | Springfield Township | | | | | |
| Lake Louise | Brandon Township | | | | | |
| Lake Mauna Loa | Springfield Township | | | | | |
| Lake Neva | Highland Township | | | | | |
| Lake Nicholas | Brandon Township | | | | | |
| Lake Oahu | Springfield Township | | | | | |
| Lake Oakland | Waterford Township | 255 | 103 | 64 | 20 | |
| Lake O'Brien | Highland Township | | | | | |
| Lake Ona | White Lake Township | | | | | |
| Lake Orion | Orion Township | 506 | 205 | 80 | 24 | |
| Lake Sherwood | Commerce Township | | | | | |
| Lake Sixteen | Oxford Township | | | | | |
| Lakeville Lake | Orion Township | 460 | 186 | 68 | 21 | |
| Lantern Lake | Auburn Hills | | | | | |
| Leggets Lake | Waterford Township | 25 | 10 | 10 | 3 | |
| Leonard Lake | Highland Township | | | | | |
| Lester Lake | Waterford Township | 12 | 5 | 25 | 8 | |
| Little Lake | Springfield Township | | | | | |
| Little Carroll Lake | Commerce Township | | | | | |
| Little Crotched Lake | Springfield Township | | | | | |
| Little School Lot Lake | Rose Township | | | | | |
| Little Walters Lake | Independence Township | | | | | |
| Long Lake | Springfield Township | | | | | |
| Long Lake | Orion Township | | | | | |
| Long Lake | Brandon Township | | | | | |
| Long Lake | Oxford Township | | | | | |
| Long Lake | Commerce Township | | | | | |
| Loon Lake | Milford Township | | | | | |
| Loon Lake | Waterford Township | 243 | 98 | 73 | 22 | |
| Lotus Lake | Waterford Township | 185 | 75 | 65 | 20 | |
| Lower Long Lake | Bloomfield Township | | | | | |
| Lower Pettibone Lake | Milford Township | | | | | |
| Lower Proud Lake | Commerce Township | | | | | |
| Lower Straits Lake | Commerce Township | | | | | |
| Maceday Lake | Waterford Township | 234 | 95 | 117 | 36 | |
| Mandon Lake | White Lake Township | 26 | 11 | 14 | 4 | |
| Manito Lake | Oxford Township | | | | | |
| Mari Lake | Springfield Township | | | | | |
| Martin Lake | Springfield Township | | | | | |
| McGinnis Lake | Springfield Township | | | | | |
| McWithy Lake | Highland Township | | | | | |
| Mead Lake | Independence Township | | | | | |
| Meadow Lake | White Lake Township | | | | | |
| Mercedes Lake | Commerce Township | | | | | |
| Meyers Lake | Highland Township | | | | | |
| Middle Lake | Independence Township | 23 | 9 | 35 | 11 | |
| Middle Straits Lake | Commerce Township | | | | | |
| Miller Lake | Rochester Hills | | | | | |
| Miller Lake | Orion Township | | | | | |
| Minnie Lake | Springfield Township | | | | | |
| Mirror Lake | Commerce Township | | | | | |
| Mohawk Lake | Waterford Township | 23 | 9 | 33 | 10 | |
| Moore Lake | Milford Township | | | | | |
| Morgan Lake | Independence Township | | | | | |
| Morgan Lake | Waterford Township | 28 | 11 | 25 | 8 | |
| Morris Lake | Commerce Township | | | | | |
| Moss Lake | Milford Township | | | | | |
| Mud Lake | Commerce Township | | | | | |
| Narrin Lake | Brandon Township | | | | | |
| Orange Lake | Bloomfield Township | | | | | |
| Orchard Lake | West Bloomfield Township | 795 | 322 | 110 | 34 | |
| Otter Lake | Waterford Township | 74 | 30 | 50 | 15 | |
| Oxbow Lake | White Lake Township | | | | | |
| Oxford Lake | Orion Township | | | | | |
| Parke Lake | Independence Township | 23 | 9 | 50 | 15 | |
| Pebble Lake | Rochester Hills | | | | | |
| Peninsula Lake | Highland Township | | | | | |
| Perch Lake | Highland Township | | | | | |
| Phillip Lake | Milford Township | | | | | |
| Phipps Lake | Springfield Township | | | | | |
| Pickerel Lake | Highland Township | | | | | |
| Pickett Lake | Milford Township | | | | | |
| Pier Lake | Springfield Township | | | | | |
| Pine Lake | West Bloomfield Township | 395 | 160 | 90 | 27 | |
| Pine Lake | Oxford Township | | | | | |
| Pitch Haven Lake | Commerce Township | | | | | |
| Pleasant Lake | Commerce Township | | | | | |
| Pleasant Lake | Waterford Township | 95 | 38 | 52 | 16 | |
| Ploss Lake | Orion Township | | | | | |
| Pontiac Lake | White Lake Township | 640 | 259 | 34 | 10 | |
| Powell Lake | Oxford Township | | | | | |
| Prince Lake | Orion Township | | | | | |
| Proud Lake | Commerce Township | | | | | |
| Pungs Lake | Oxford Township | | | | | |
| Quicksand Lake | Commerce Township | | | | | |
| Rainbow Lake | Waterford Township | 5 | 2 | 15 | 5 | |
| Rattalee Lake | Springfield Township | | | | | |
| Reed Lake | Commerce Township | | | | | |
| Rice Lake | Holly Township | | | | | |
| Richardson Lake | Rose Township | | | | | |
| Round Lake | Addison Township | | | | | |
| Round Lake | Commerce Township | | | | | |
| Round Lake | Independence Township | | | | | |
| Round Lake | Oxford Township | | | | | |
| Round Lake | Commerce Township | | | | | |
| Sans Souci Lake | Springfield Township | | | | | |
| Schmitt Lake | Highland Township | | | | | |
| Schoolhouse Lake | Waterford Township | 37 | 15 | 49 | 15 | |
| Scotch Lake | Commerce Township | | | | | |
| Scott Lake | Waterford Township | 78 | 32 | 35 | 11 | |
| Sears Lake | Milford Township | | | | | |
| Seymour Lake | Oxford Township | | | | | |
| Shadow Lake | Addison Township | | | | | |
| Shiawassee Lake | Highland Township | | | | | |
| Shoe Lake | Orion Township | | | | | |
| Silver Lake | Waterford Township | 101 | 41 | 73 | 22 | |
| Simonson Lake | Rose Township | | | | | |
| Simpson Lake | Springfield Township | | | | | |
| Slack Lake | Springfield Township | | | | | |
| Sodon Lake | Bloomfield Township | | | | | |
| Softwater Lake | Springfield Township | | | | | |
| Spring Lake | Independence Township | | | | | |
| Spring Lake | Springfield Township | | | | | |
| Spring Lake | Oxford Township | | | | | |
| Square Lake | Bloomfield Township | | | | | |
| Square Lake | Oxford Township | | | | | |
| Squaw Lake | Oxford Township | | | | | |
| Stewart Lake | Springfield Township | | | | | |
| Stiffs Mill Pond | Rose Township | | | | | |
| Stison Lake | Highland Township | | | | | |
| Stony Lake | Oxford Township | | | | | |
| Strawberry Lake | Springfield Township | | | | | |
| Stuart Lake | Commerce Township | | | | | |
| Sugden Lake | Commerce Township | | | | | |
| Sullivan Lake | Rose Township | | | | | |
| Susin Lake | Springfield Township | | | | | |
| Sylvan Lake | Waterford Township | 458 | 185 | 71 | 22 | |
| Sylvan Glen Lake | Rochester Hills | | | | | |
| Tamarack Lake | Springfield Township | | | | | |
| Tamarack Lake | Orion Township | | | | | |
| Tan Lake | Oxford Township | | | | | |
| Taylor Lake | Rose Township | | | | | |
| Teeple Lake | Highland Township | | | | | |
| Tipsico Lake | Rose Township | | | | | |
| Tomahawk Lake | Highland Township | | | | | |
| Tooley Lake | Springfield Township | | | | | |
| Tommys Lake | Orion Township | 42 | 17 | | | |
| Townsend Lake | Independence Township | 26 | 11 | 55 | 17 | |
| Tray Lake | Milford Township | | | | | |
| Tremper Lake | Rose Township | | | | | |
| Truax Lake | Brandon Township | | | | | |
| Tull Lake | White Lake Township | | | | | |
| Tully Lake | Brandon Township | | | | | |
| Twin Sun Lake | Milford Township | | | | | |
| Union Lake | Commerce Township | 465 | 188 | 110 | 34 | |
| Upper Bushman Lake | Independence Township | 30 | 12 | 32 | 10 | |
| Upper Lakeville Lake | Addison Township | | | | | |
| Upper Long Lake | Bloomfield Township | | | | | |
| Upper Pettibone Lake | Highland Township | | | | | |
| Upper Silver Lake | Waterford Township | 36 | 15 | 30 | 9 | |
| Upper Straits | Bloomfield Township | | | | | |
| Valley Lake | Springfield Township | | | | | |
| Van Norman Lake | Independence Township | 66 | 27 | 90 | 27 | |
| Voorheis Lake | Orion Township | 250 | 101 | 70 | 21 | |
| Wabeek Lake | Bloomfield Township | | | | | |
| Walled Lake | Commerce Township | 670 | 271 | 53 | 16 | |
| Walker Lake | Rochester Hills | | | | | |
| Walnut Lake | West Bloomfield Township | 232 | 94 | 101 | 31 | |
| Walters Lake | Independence Township | 77 | 31 | 76 | 23 | |
| Waterbury Lake | Highland Township | | | | | |
| Waterstone Lake | Oxford Township | | | | | |
| Watkins Lake | Waterford Township | 238 | 96 | 25 | 8 | |
| Waumegah Lake | Springfield Township | | | | | |
| West Wind Lake | Rose Township | | | | | |
| Whipple Lake | Independence Township | 75 | 30 | 50 | 15 | |
| Whisper Lake | Oxford Township | | | | | |
| White Lake | White Lake Township | 540 | 219 | 32 | 10 | |
| White Horse Lake | Waterford Township | 8 | 3 | 10 | 3 | |
| Wilson Lake | Brandon Township | | | | | |
| Wilson Lake | Rose Township | | | | | |
| Wing Lake | Bloomfield Township | | | | | |
| Wildwood Lake | Groveland Township | | | | | |
| Williams Lake | Waterford Township | 155 | 63 | 45 | 14 | |
| Wolverine Lake | Commerce Township | | | | | |
| Woodbridge Lake | Commerce Township | | | | | |
| Woodhull Lake | Waterford Township | 135 | 55 | 56 | 17 | |
| Woodpecker Lake | Commerce Township | | | | | |
| Woodruff Lake | Highland Township | | | | | |
| Wormer Lake | Waterford Township | 28 | 11 | 24 | 7 | |

== Public boat launches ==
Twelve all-sports lakes have public boat launches: Big Lake, Cass Lake, Cedar Island Lake, Crescent Lake, Lake Oakland, Lake Orion, Long Lake (Commerce Township), Maceday Lake, Pontiac Lake, Tipsico Lake, Union Lake, and White Lake. In addition, no-wake lakes in Oakland County with public boat launches include Crooked Lake, Heron Lake, Kent Lake and Wildwood Lake.
