= Maceday Lake (Michigan) =

Lake in the state of Michigan, United States

- Location within Michigan Location within the United States
- Location: Oakland County, Michigan
- Coordinates: 42°41′17″N 83°25′53″W
- Type: Lake
- Basin countries: United States
- Surface area: 234 acres (95 ha)
- Max. depth: 117 ft (36 m)
- Surface elevation: 965 ft (294 m)
- Islands: one
- Settlements: Waterford Township

Maceday Lake /ˈmeɪs.deɪ/ is an all-sports, 234-acre (95 ha) Oakland County, Michigan lake along the Clinton River.

Maceday Lake connects upstream with the 185-acre (75 ha) Lotus Lake downstream and with the 155-acre (63 ha) Williams Lake.

Blain Island lies between Maceday Lake and Lotus Lake. It is accessible by car via a bridge. There are mostly high-end luxury homes on the island.

There is a public boat launch on Maceday Lake.

Maceday Lake is the second deepest lake in Oakland County behind Cass Lake. The ten deepest lakes in Oakland County are:

1. Cass Lake (Waterford Twp. and West Bloomfield Twp.) 123 feet (37 m)
2. Maceday Lake (Waterford Twp.) 117 feet (36 m)
3t. Orchard Lake (West Bloomfield Twp.) 110 feet (34 m)
3t. Union Lake (Commerce Twp.) 110 feet (34 m)
5. Walnut Lake (West Bloomfield Twp.) 101 feet (31 m)
6t. Van Norman Lake (Independence Twp. and Waterford Twp.) 90 feet (27 m)
6t. Pine Lake (West Bloomfield Twp.) 90 feet (27 m)
8. Lake Angelus (Auburn Hills) 88 feet (27 m)
9t. Loon Lake (Waterford Twp.) 73 feet (22 m)
9t. Silver Lake (Waterford Twp.) 73 feet (22 m)

== Namesake ==
Maceday Lake was named for Mason "Mace" Day, who was seen fishing on the lake so often, the residents of the area began referring to the lake as Mace Day Lake.

== Fish ==
Fish in Maceday Lake include pumpkinseed sunfish, largemouth bass, walleye, northern pike, splake, rainbow trout, lake trout, and crappie.
