= Michigan district courts =

Aspect of government

District courts are courts of limited jurisdiction in the State of Michigan. They were established by the State Legislature in Act 236 of 1961 to consolidate the functions of several courts of limited jurisdiction such as traffic courts and municipal courts. In response, nearly all cities in the state have ceased operating a municipal court, except for the five Grosse Pointes in Wayne County; each has its own municipal court, except for Grosse Pointe Woods and Grosse Pointe Shores, which operate one jointly.

There are currently 103 district courts in the state (four district courts - 42nd (Macomb County), 52nd (Oakland County), 67th (Genesee County) and 70th (Saginaw County) - are single court districts with judges from multiple "election divisions" based at separate locations within the respective districts). They handle most traffic violations, civil disputes seeking money damages up to $25,000, landlord-tenant disputes and criminal cases in which the defendant is charged with a misdemeanor that is punishable by not more than one-year imprisonment.

District Judges are elected for six-year terms and may appoint magistrates. Magistrates may set bail and accept bonds in criminal matters, accept guilty pleas, impose sentences for dog, game, traffic, motor carrier, snowmobile and boat law violations. They may also issue arrest and search warrants. Attorney magistrates may also hear small claims cases or perform other duties described in the statute, as directed by the Chief Judge.

A person aged 18-years or older who is charged with a crime will begin their case with an appearance before a district court judge. In an appearance, the district court will explain the charges to the defendant along with their rights, and the possible consequences if convicted of the charge. The court also determines the amount and conditions of bail and collects it if the defendant is able to post a bond.

The district court will conduct a trial for defendants charged with a misdemeanor, that is punishable by not more than one year in jail, and sentence the defendant.

In felony cases (generally, cases that are punishable by more than one year in prison), the district court will set the bail amount and hold a preliminary examination to determine if a crime was committed and if there is probable cause to believe the defendant committed the crime. If so, the case is transferred to the circuit court for trial and is referred to as having been "bound over."

District courts also contain a small claims division which handles civil cases up to $7,000. For these cases, the parties must agree to waive their right to a jury, representation by a lawyer, rules of evidence and to appeal the decision of the district judge. If the parties do not agree to these terms, the case is heard in the district court’s general civil division.

== List of District Courts ==
As of the 2023-2024 Legislative Session

(*) indicates a District Court presided over by the Probate Judge

Court	County	Number of Judges	Courthouse location(s)	Image	Notes
1st District Court	Monroe	3	Monroe	Monroe County Courthouse	
2A District Court	Lenawee	2	Adrian		Originally established as the 2-1 District Court (2nd District Court, 1st Division). The 2nd District Court was separated into two separate courts (2A and 2B) on January 1, 1999.
2B District Court	Hillsdale	1	Hillsdale		Originally established as the 2-2 District Court (2nd District Court, 2nd Division). The 2nd District Court was separated into two separate courts (2A and 2B) on January 1, 1999.
3A District Court	Branch	1	Coldwater		Originally established as the 3-1 District Court (3rd District Court, 1st Division). The 3rd District Court was separated into two separate courts (3A and 3B) in 1991.
3B District Court	St. Joseph	2	Centreville		Originally established as the 3-2 District Court (3rd District Court, 2nd Division). The 3rd District Court was separated into two separate courts (3A and 3B) in 1991.
4th District Court	Cass	1	Cassopolis		
5th District Court	Berrien	5	St. Joseph and Niles		The Michigan Supreme Court has designated the Berrien County Courts as a consolidation site for the merger of the District Court, Probate Court and Circuit Court into a single Trial Court. The 6th District Court, which consisted of the cities of Benton Harbor and St. Joseph was merged into the 5th District Court in the 1970s to form a county-wide district court.
7th District Court	Van Buren	2	Paw Paw		
8th District Court	Kalamazoo	6	Kalamazoo		The 9th District Court, which served the cities of Kalamazoo (9-1) and Portage (9-2), were merged into the 8th District Court in 1999 to become a county-wide district court.
10th District Court	Calhoun	4	Battle Creek		The 11th District Court, which served the city of Battle Creek, merged into the 10th District Court in 1975 to become a county-wide district court.
12th District Court	Jackson	4	Jackson		The 13th District Court, which served the City of Jackson, merged into the 12th District Court in 1985 to become a county-wide district court.
14A District Court	Washtenaw (except the City of Ann Arbor and Ypsilanti Township)	3	Pittsfield Township (14A-1), Ypsilanti (14A-2), Chelsea (14A-3) and Saline (14A-4)		
14B District Court	Washtenaw (Ypsilanti Township)	1	Ypsilanti Township		Began operations on January 1, 1985 after Ypsilanti Township approved establishing a municipal-funded court separate from then-14th District Court.
15th District Court	Washtenaw (City of Ann Arbor)	3	Ann Arbor		
16th District Court	Wayne (City of Livonia)	2	Livonia		
17th District Court	Wayne (Redford Township)	2	Redford Township		
18th District Court	Wayne (City of Westland)	2	Westland		
19th District Court	Wayne (City of Dearborn)	3	Dearborn		
20th District Court	Wayne (City of Dearborn Heights)	2	Dearborn Heights		
21st District Court	Wayne (Garden City)	1	Garden City		
22nd District Court	Wayne (City of Inkster)	1	Inkster		
23rd District Court	Wayne (City of Taylor)	2	Taylor		The 23rd District Court was established on January 1, 1980, replacing the Taylor Municipal Court.
24th District Court	Wayne (Cities of Allen Park and Melvindale)	2	Allen Park		The 24th District Court was established with the merger of the Allen Park and Melvindale Municipal Courts on December 1, 1977.
25th District Court	Wayne (Cities of Ecorse, Lincoln Park and River Rouge )	2	Lincoln Park		The 25th District Court was established on December 1, 1977, replacing the Lincoln Park Municipal Court. The 26th District Court commenced operations on December 1, 1979, with the consolidation of the Ecorse and River Rouge Municipal Courts and merged with the 25th District Court effective April 1, 2012
27th District Court	Wayne (Cities of Wyandotte and Riverview )	1	Wyandotte		The 27th District Court was established with the merger of the Riverview and Wyandotte Municipal Courts on December 1, 1977.
28th District Court	Wayne (City of Southgate)	1	Southgate		The 28th District Court was established on January 1, 1979, replacing the Southgate Municipal Court.
29th District Court	Wayne (City of Wayne)	1	Wayne City		
30th District Court	Wayne (City of Highland Park)	1	Highland Park		The 30th District Court was established on January 1, 1979, replacing the Highland Park Municipal Court.
31st District Court	Wayne (City of Hamtramck)	1	Hamtramck		The 31st District Court was established on January 1, 1979, replacing the Hamtramck Municipal Court.
32A District Court	Wayne (City of Harper Woods)	1	Harper Woods		The 32A District Court was established on January 1, 1979, replacing the Harper Woods Municipal Court.
32B District Court	Wayne (Cities of Grosse Pointe, Grosse Pointe Farms, Grosse Pointe Park, Grosse Pointe Woods and Grosse Pointe Shores)	0	(Reserved for Future Use)		The 32B District Court is reserved for a potential district court serving the Grosse Pointes, which are served by four grandfathered and still active municipal courts located in Grosse Pointe, Grosse Pointe Farms, Grosse Pointe Park and Grosse Pointe Woods.
33rd District Court	Wayne (Cities of Trenton, Gibraltar, Woodhaven, Rockwood and Flat Rock; Townships of Brownstown and Grosse Ile)	2	Woodhaven		
34th District Court	Wayne (Cities of Romulus and Belleville; Townships of Sumpter, Van Buren and Huron)	3	Romulus		
35th District Court	Wayne (Cities of Northville and Plymouth; Townships of Northville, Plymouth and Canton)	3	Plymouth		
36th District Court	Wayne (City of Detroit)	29	Detroit		Replaced the Detroit Common Pleas Court and the traffic/ordinance division of the Detroit Recorders Court; commenced September 1, 1981.
37th District Court	Macomb (Cities of Warren and Center Line)	4	Warren and Center Line		
38th District Court	Macomb (City of Eastpointe)	1	Eastpointe		The 38th District Court was established on January 1, 2004, replacing the Eastpointe Municipal Court.
39th District Court	Macomb (Cities of Roseville and Fraser)	3	Roseville		
40th District Court	Macomb (City of St. Clair Shores)	2	St. Clair Shores		Established on November 1, 1978, replacing the St. Clair Shores Municipal Court.
41A District Court	Macomb (Cities of Sterling Heights and Utica; Townships of Shelby and Macomb)	4	Shelby Township and Sterling Heights		
41B District Court	Macomb (City of Mount Clemens, Clinton Township and Harrison Township)	3	Clinton Township		
42-1 District Court	Macomb (Cities of Memphis and Richmond; Townships of Bruce, Washington, Armada, Ray and Richmond)	1	Romeo		
42-2 District Court	Macomb (City of New Baltimore, Lenox Township and Chesterfield Township)	1	New Baltimore		
43rd District Court	Oakland (Cities of Ferndale, Hazel Park and Madison Heights)	3	Ferndale, Hazel Park and Madison Heights		
44th District Court	Oakland (Cities of Royal Oak and Berkley)	2	Royal Oak		The City of Berkley was moved from the 45th District Court to the 44th District Court on January 2, 2015.
45th District Court	Oakland (Cities of Huntington Woods, Oak Park and Pleasant Ridge; Royal Oak Township)	2	Oak Park		The 45A District Court (City of Berkeley) and the 45B District Court (Huntington Woods, Oak Park, Pleasant Ridge, Royal Oak Township) merged into the 45th District Court on July 1, 2012.
46th District Court	Oakland (Cities of Southfield and Lathrup Village; Southfield Township)	3	Southfield		
47th District Court	Oakland (Cities of Farmington and Farmington Hills)	2	Farmington Hills		
48th District Court	Oakland (Cities of Birmingham, Bloomfield Hills, Sylvan Lake, Keego Harbor and Orchard Lake; Townships of Bloomfield and West Bloomfield)	3	Bloomfield Township		
50th District Court	Oakland (City of Pontiac)	3	Pontiac		
51st District Court	Oakland (Waterford Township)	2	Waterford Township		
52-1 District Court	Oakland (Cities of Novi, South Lyon, Wixom and Walled Lake; Townships of Milford, Highland, Commerce, Lyon and Novi	3	Novi		
52-2 District Court	Oakland (City of Clarkston; Townships of Springfield, Independence, Holly, Groveland, Rose, White Lake and Brandon)	2	Independence Township		
52-3 District Court	Oakland (Cities of Rochester Hills, Auburn Hills, Rochester and Lake Angelus; Townships of Oxford, Addison, Orion and Oakland)	3	Rochester Hills		
52-4 District Court	Oakland (Cities of Troy and Clawson)	2	Troy	52-4 District Court building in Troy	Was originally designated as the 49th District Court in the enabling legislation effective in 1969. However, the Troy and Clawson Municipal Courts remained in operation until November 1, 1978, when the two courts merged to become the fourth division of the county-funded 52nd District Court.
53rd District Court	Livingston	2	Howell		
54A District Court	Ingham (City of Lansing)	4	Lansing		
54B District Court	Ingham (City of East Lansing)	2	East Lansing		
55th District Court	Ingham (except the Cities of Lansing and East Lansing)	2	Mason		
56A District Court	Eaton	2	Charlotte		The 56th District Court was separated into two separate courts (56A and 56B) on January 1, 1999.
56B District Court	Barry	1	Hastings		The 56th District Court was separated into two separate courts (56A and 56B) on January 1, 1999.
57th District Court	Allegan	2	Allegan		
58th District Court	Ottawa	4	Grand Haven, Holland and Hudsonville		
59th District Court	Kent (Cities of Grandville and Walker)	1	Grandville and Walker		The 59th District Court was established on January 1, 1981, replacing the Grandville and Walker Municipal Courts.
60th District Court	Muskegon	4	Muskegon		The original 59th District Court served the city of Muskegon, the city of Muskegon Heights and Muskegon Township before being merged into the county-wide 60th District Court in 1973.
61st District Court	Kent (City of Grand Rapids)	6	Grand Rapids		
62A District Court	Kent (City of Wyoming)	2	Wyoming		The 62A District Court was established on January 1, 1979, replacing the Wyoming Municipal Court.
62B District Court	Kent (City of Kentwood)	1	Kentwood		The 62B District Court was established on January 1, 1979, replacing the Kentwood Municipal Court.
63rd District Court	Kent (except the Cities of Grand Rapids, Grandville, Walker, Wyoming and Kentwood)	2	Grand Rapids Township		
64A District Court	Ionia	1	Ionia		
64B District Court	Montcalm	1	Stanton		
65A District Court	Clinton	1	St. Johns		
65B District Court	Gratiot	1	Ithaca		
66th District Court	Shiawassee	1	Corunna		
67-1 District Court	Genesee (Cities of Flushing and Clio; Townships of Flushing, Flint, Montrose, Thetford and Vienna	1	Flint (formerly located in Flushing)		Merged into 67-5 (Flint) Division on December 3, 2025, however, the 67-3 election district remains in place
67-2 District Court	Genesee (Cities of Davison & Burton; Townships of Davison, Forest, Richfield and Atlas)	2	Davison (67-2A) and Burton (67-2B)		
67-3 District Court	Genesee (City of Mount Morris; Townships of Mount Morris and Genesee)	1	Flint (formerly located in Mount Morris)		Merged into 67-5 (Flint) Division on December 3, 2025, however, the 67-3 election district remains in place
67-4 District Court	Genesee (Cities of Fenton, Grand Blanc and Swartz Creek; Townships of Fenton, Argentine, Grand Blanc, Mundy, Gaines and Clayton)	2	Fenton (67-4A) and Grand Blanc (67-4B)		
67-5 District Court	Genesee (City of Flint)	4	Flint		The 68th District Court, which served the city of Flint, merged into the 67th District Courts in 2016 to become a county-wide district court.; The physical offices of the 67-1 (Flushing) and 67-3 (Mount Morris) divisions of the court were relocated into the 67-5 division (Flint) courthouse on December 3, 2025; the election districts remain in place as of December 2025
70-1 District Court	Saginaw (Cities of Saginaw and Zilwaukee; Townships of Zilwaukee, Buena Vista, Carrollton and Bridgeport)	2	Saginaw		The 69th District Court, which served the city of Saginaw, merged into the 70th District Court (c.1972) to become a county-wide district court.
70-2 District Court	Saginaw (except Cities of Saginaw and Zilwaukee; Townships of Zilwaukee, Buena Vista, Carrollton and Bridgeport)	3	Saginaw		
71A District Court	Lapeer	1	Lapeer		
71B District Court	Tuscola	1	Caro		
72nd District Court	St. Clair	3	Port Huron and Marine City		
73A District Court	Sanilac	*	Sandusky		
73B District Court	Huron	*	Bad Axe		
74th District Court	Bay	3	Bay City		
75th District Court	Midland	1	Midland		
76th District Court	Isabella	1	Mount Pleasant		
77th District Court	Osceola and Mecosta	1	Big Rapids and Reed City		
78th District Court	Lake and Newaygo	1	White Cloud and Baldwin		Lake County moved from 79th District Court to 78th District Court on July 1, 2022.
79th District Court	Oceana and Mason	1	Hart and Ludington		Oceana County moved from 78th District Court to 79th District Court on July 1, 2022.
80th District Court	Gladwin and Clare	1	Gladwin and Harrison		
81st District Court	Alcona, Arenac, Iosco and Oscoda	*	Harrisville, Mio, Standish and Tawas City		Alcona and Oscoda Counties were transferred from the 82nd District Court to the 81st District Court on April 1, 2003.
82nd District Court	Ogemaw and Roscommon	1	Roscommon and West Branch		The 83rd District Court (Roscommon County) was merged with the 82nd District Court on April 1, 2012.
84th District Court	Missaukee and Wexford	1	Cadillac and Lake City		
85th District Court	Benzie and Manistee	*	Beulah and Manistee		
86th District Court	Antrim, Grand Traverse and Leelanau	2	Traverse City, Bellaire and Suttons Bay		Antrim County moved from 87th District Court to 86th District Court on March 26, 2000.
87A District Court	Otsego	*	Gaylord		The 87th District Court was separated into three separate courts (87A, 87B and 87C) on January 2, 2009.
87B District Court	Kalkaska	*	Kalkaska		The 87th District Court was separated into three separate courts (87A, 87B and 87C) on January 2, 2009.
87C District Court	Crawford	*	Grayling		Originally part of the 83rd District Court; moved to the then-87th District Court on April 1, 2003. The 87th District Court was separated into three separate courts (87A, 87B and 87C) on January 2, 2009.
88th District Court	Alpena and Montmorency	*	Atlanta and Alpena		
89th District Court	Cheboygan and Presque Isle	1	Cheboygan and Rogers City		
90th District Court	Emmet and Charlevoix	1	Charlevoix and Petoskey		
91st District Court	Chippewa	*	Sault Ste. Marie		
92nd District Court	Luce and Mackinac	1	St. Ignace and Newberry		
93rd District Court	Alger and Schoolcraft	*	Manistique and Munising		
94th District Court	Delta	1	Escanaba		
95A District Court	Menominee	1	Menominee		
95B District Court	Iron and Dickinson	1	Iron Mountain and Crystal Falls		
96th District Court	Marquette	2	Marquette		
97th District Court	Baraga, Houghton and Keweenaw	1	Eagle River, Houghton and L'Anse		The 99th District Court, which consisted of Houghton and Keweenaw Counties, were merged into the 97th District Court in 1972.
98th District Court	Ontonagon and Gogebic	*	Bessemer and Ontonagon		
