= Pine Lake (West Bloomfield Township, Michigan) =

Lake in the state of Michigan, United States

- Location within Michigan Location within the United States
- Location: Oakland County, Michigan
- Coordinates: 42°35′25″N 83°20′13″W
- Type: Lake
- Basin countries: United States
- Surface area: 395 acres (160 ha)
- Max. depth: 90 ft (27 m)
- Surface elevation: 932 ft (284 m)
- Settlements: West Bloomfield Township

Pine Lake is a private, all-sports, 395-acre (160 ha) lake in West Bloomfield Township, Oakland County, in the U.S. state of Michigan.

The Pine Lake shoreline is lined with high-end exclusive homes.

In addition to Pine Lake Marina, Pine Lake Country Club is also located on the lake.

The 90-foot-deep (27 m) lake is the sixth-deepest lake in Oakland County. The ten deepest lakes in Oakland County are:

1. Cass Lake (Waterford Twp. and West Bloomfield Twp.) 123 feet (37 m)
2. Maceday Lake (Waterford Twp.) 117 feet (36 m)
3t. Orchard Lake (West Bloomfield Twp.) 110 feet (34 m)
3t. Union Lake (Commerce Twp.) 110 feet (34 m)
5. Walnut Lake (West Bloomfield Twp.) 101 feet (31 m)
6t. Van Norman Lake (Independence Twp. and Waterford Twp.) 90 feet (27 m)
6t. Pine Lake (West Bloomfield Twp.) 90 feet (27 m)
8. Lake Angelus (Auburn Hills) 88 feet (27 m)
9t. Loon Lake (Waterford Twp.) 73 feet (22 m)
9t. Silver Lake (Waterford Twp.) 73 feet (22 m)
