= Loon Lake (Waterford Township, Michigan) =

Lake in the state of Michigan, United States

- Location within Michigan
- Location: Oakland County, Michigan
- Coordinates: 42°40′53″N 83°21′32″W
- Type: Freshwater Lake
- Basin countries: United States
- Surface area: 243 acres (98 ha)
- Max. depth: 73 ft (22 m)
- Surface elevation: 948 ft (289 m)
- Settlements: Waterford Township

Loon Lake is a freshwater lake located in Waterford Township, Michigan. It borders Dixie Highway on the west and is south of Walton Blvd. on the north. The sand-bottom lake is 243 acres (98 ha), making it the 18th largest lake in Oakland County, Michigan and one of the largest in Waterford Township.

Loon Lake is located on the upper reaches of the Clinton River watershed. The Clinton River enters Lake Loon on the north end from Lake Oakland upstream.

The Clinton River exits to the southwest downstream of Loon Lake.

Loon Lake also connects to Silver Lake to the east.

From Loon Lake, the Clinton River heads west toward the Drayton Plains State Fish Hatchery and then winds its way southward to Cass Lake.

At its deepest point, the lake is 73 feet (22 m) deep, making it the ninth deepest lake in Oakland County.

The ten deepest lakes in Oakland County are:

1. Cass Lake (Waterford Twp. and West Bloomfield Twp.) 123 feet (37 m)
2. Maceday Lake (Waterford Twp.) 117 feet (36 m)
3t. Orchard Lake (West Bloomfield Twp.) 110 feet (34 m)
3t. Union Lake (Commerce Twp.) 110 feet (34 m)
5. Walnut Lake (West Bloomfield Twp.) 101 feet (31 m)
6t. Van Norman Lake (Independence Twp. and Waterford Twp.) 90 feet (27 m)
6t. Pine Lake (West Bloomfield Twp.) 90 feet (27 m)
8. Lake Angelus (Auburn Hills) 88 feet (27 m)
9t. Loon Lake (Waterford Twp.) 73 feet (22 m)
9t. Silver Lake (Waterford Twp.) 73 feet (22 m)

Loon Lake is surrounded by residential neighborhoods on all sides except the western shoreline. The community, formerly called Drayton Plains, is on the lake to the west. In the 1960s, Loon Lake hosted annual hydroplane boat races.

== Fish ==
Loon Lake contains a variety of fish, including black crappie, bluegill, largemouth bass, northern pike, rock bass, smallmouth bass, sunfish, walleye and yellow perch.
