= Louis George Carpenter =

Civil engineer

Doctor Louis George Carpenter
- Born: March 28, 1861; Orion, Oakland County, Michigan United States
- Died: September 12, 1935 (aged 74); Denver, Arapahoe County, Colorado
- Occupations: Educator; Professor of Irrigation, Professor of Engineering & Physics
- Writing career
- Language: English
- Period: 19th-century

Louis George Carpenter (March 28, 1861 – September 12, 1935), was a college Professor and later the Dean of Engineering & Physics at Colorado State University formerly known as the Colorado Agricultural College. He was also a mathematician and an irrigation and consulting engineer.

== Family ==
Louis George Carpenter was born on March 28, 1861, the son of Charles Ketchum Carpenter and Jeanette Coryelle Carpenter. His siblings included two notable brothers, Professor Rolla C. Carpenter of Cornell University and jurist William L. Carpenter.

He married Mrs. Mary Jane Cliff Merrell (a librarian at Michigan State Agricultural College—now Michigan State University—and the second woman graduate from the college) in 1887 in Michigan. They had a son and daughter before she died in 1921. He remarried in 1922 to Katherine M. Warren.

Carpenter died in Denver, Colorado on September 12, 1935. He was buried in Evergreen Cemetery in Lake Orion, Oakland County, Michigan.

== Schooling ==
Carpenter graduated in 1879 from the Michigan State Agricultural College with a Bachelor of Science degree. He studied at Johns Hopkins University from 1879 to 1881 then from 1881 to 1883 he was tutored at the University of Michigan literary department.

From 1881 to 1888 he served as an assistant to his brother, Professor Rolla C. Carpenter, in teaching courses at the Michigan State Agricultural College.

In 1883 he was awarded his Masters of Science degree from Michigan State Agricultural College.

== Career ==
Carpenter began teaching mathematics at Michigan State Agricultural College and did so from 1883 to 1888.

Carpenter was recruited by President Charles Ingersoll and accepted the chair of the Engineering & Physics Department of the then Colorado Agricultural College. It was there where he began the first organized and systematic college program for irrigation engineering. Those completing such instruction were awarded a Bachelor of Science degree in Irrigation Engineering. In addition, Carpenter was a strong advocate to expand education opportunities to minorities and women. He helped promote and organize newly accredited degree programs despite opposition from those unwilling to change.

Carpenter declined the Presidency of that college (later university) in 1891 and several times during his tenure. Despite difficultly to enact change, he was significant in being able to help transform the farm focused college into a university of higher learning.

In 1889 he became the director of the Colorado Agricultural Experiment Station.

Carpenter was one of the foremost leading experts on irrigation systems. During his life he investigated irrigation systems not only in North America but also in Canada and Europe. This led to his engineering consulting and water law. He became Colorado's State Engineer which he held for several years while still teaching.

In 1911, Carpenter left academics and established an engineering consulting firm in Denver, Colorado. This covered not only included Irrigation Engineering but consulting on hydraulic construction projects and the problems associated with such projects. He did this traveling around Canada, the United States and Western Europe with his brother running the office until his retirement in 1922. He left many papers to the University and was given an honorary doctorate before his death in 1935.

== Further work ==
In 1907, Carpenter concluded a report for the British Columbia Irrigation commission to assist them in implementing in engineering the irrigation of southern BC. This led to the eventual development of the BC Ministry of Agriculture eight present watershed and demand areas.

Reportedly, he reviewed and edited geological reports from several countries.

== Books ==
One example of a book written by Carpenter has the title, "On the measurement and division of water" published by the Colorado Agricultural College – Agricultural Experiment Station in Fort Collins, Colorado. This book and other like it show his primary focus on water and irrigation.

- The artesian wells of Colorado and their relation to irrigation / (Fort Collins, Colo. : State Agricultural College, Agricultural Experiment Station, [1891])
- Forests and snow / (Fort Collins, Colo. : Agricultural Experiment Station of the Agricultural College of Colorado, 1901)
- The loss of water from reservoirs by seepage and evaporation / by L.G. Carpenter. (Fort Collins, Colo. : State Agricultural College, Agricultural Experiment Station, 1898)
- Losses from canals from filtration or seepage / (Fort Collins, Colo. : State Agricultural College, Agricultural Experiment Station, 1898)
- The measurement and division of water / (Fort Collins, Colo. : State Agricultural College, Agricultural Experiment Station, 1890)
- Meteorology of 1897, with illustrations / (Fort Collins, Colo. : State Agricultural College, Agricultural Experiment Station, 1898), / by L.G. Carpenter, also by Robert E. Trimble
- On the measurement and division of water / (Fort Collins, Colo. : Agricultural Experiment Station of the Agricultural College of Colorado, 1911)
- Seepage or return waters from irrigation / (Fort Collins, Colo. : State Agricultural College, Agricultural Experiment Station, 1896)

== Papers ==
Carpenter left his academic papers related to water resources, education, irrigation and outside field work to Colorado State University after he retired in 1922. These papers detail the early work in organizing and stressing the importance of water education in modern societies.

His papers also include lantern slides of the Zola Dam in France. And correspondence of queries, students, letters of recommendation and other papers of academic nature.

A joint effort of the University Libraries and the Colorado Water Institute created a "Guide to the Papers of Louis G. Carpenter" and covers the years from 1888 to 1919. It resides at the Morgan Library at Colorado State University in Fort Collins, Colorado.

Additional papers, legal papers, articles about and newspaper clippings are at the Denver Public Library. This biographical type collection reflect his work as a "Colorado irrigation engineer who specialized in irrigation and water-use practices in the Rocky Mountain region."

== Awards ==
For his promotion of education science and engineering which had an impact not only in America, but also Canada, England and France, Carpenter was given several honors.

In 1895 he was decorated by the French government with the Chevalier du Merite Agricole. In 1900 he was awarded a Gold Medal for his scientific education at the Paris Exposition.

By 1900 Carpenter was elected a member of the British Association for the Advancement of Science and as a fellow of the American Association for the Advancement of Science

In 1927, Carpenter was awarded an honorary Doctorate of Engineering from Colorado State University.
