= Upper Silver Lake (Waterford Township, Michigan) =

Lake in the state of Michigan, United States

- Location within Michigan Location within the United States
- Location: Oakland County, Michigan
- Coordinates: 42°40′38″N 83°19′41″W
- Type: Lake
- Basin countries: United States
- Surface area: 35.5 acres (14.4 ha)
- Average depth: 30 ft (9.1 m)
- Surface elevation: 948 ft (289 m)
- Settlements: Waterford Township

Upper Silver Lake is a 35.5-acre (14.4 ha) lake located in Waterford Township, Michigan in Oakland County, Michigan.

The 30-foot-deep lake (9.1 m) is located south of Walton Blvd. and east of Silver Lake Road.

Upper Silver Lake is part of the Clinton River watershed. It connects with 101-acre (41 ha) Silver Lake to the west.

On the southeastern shore of Upper Silver Lake is Pontiac, Michigan's Hawthorne Park.

== Fish ==
Upper Silver Lake fish include bluegill and largemouth bass. Pike
