= Dodge No. 4 State Park =

Park in Michigan, United States

Dodge #4 State Park
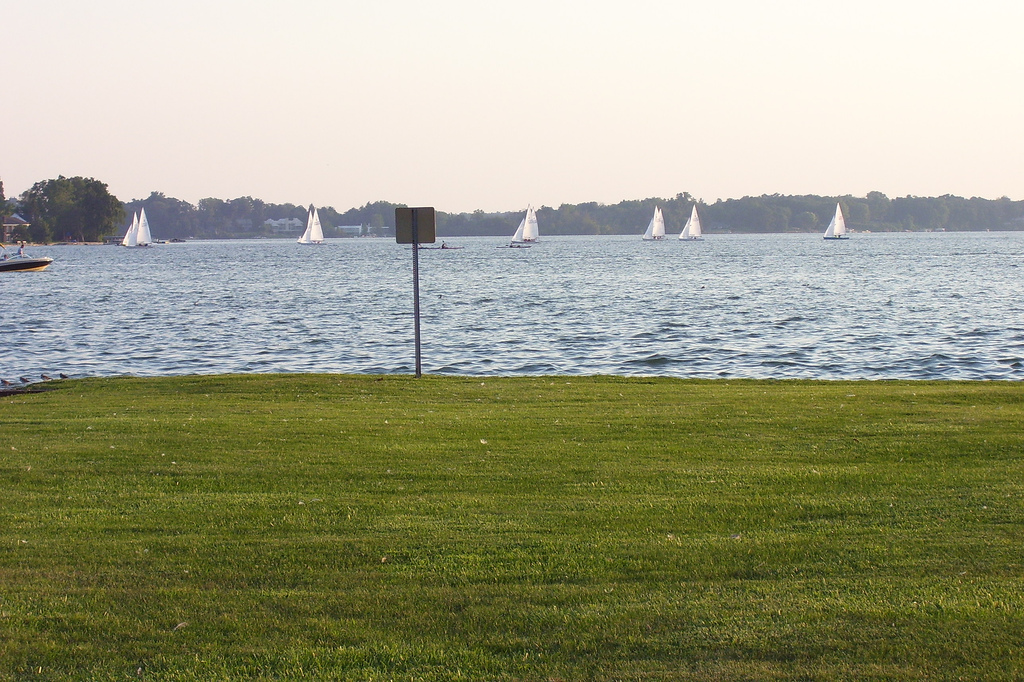
- A view of Cass Lake with sailboats

- Location within Michigan Location within the United States
- Location: West Bloomfield Township, Oakland County, Michigan, United States
- Nearest city: Keego Harbor, Michigan
- Coordinates: 42°37′00″N 83°22′04″W
- Area: 139 acres (56 ha)
- Elevation: 929 feet (283 m)
- Established: 1922
- Administrator: Michigan Department of Natural Resources
- Designation: Michigan state park
- Website: Official website

Dodge No. 4 State Park, originally the Dodge Brothers State Park No. 4, is a public recreation area covering 139 acres (56 ha) on the north shore of Cass Lake in Oakland County, northern Metro Detroit, Michigan. The state park occupies a mile of shoreline on the 1,280-acre (520 ha) lake.

== History ==
The park was created in 1922 when Dodge Brothers Corporation donated the land, stipulating that it be maintained as a public park in perpetuity. It the only remaining Dodge Brothers State Park retaining its name, with the others having been incorporated into other state parks and recreation areas (two are now parts of state game areas) or turned over to municipal authorities as locally-managed parks.

== Activities and amenities ==
The park offers swimming, fishing for bass, pike, perch and trout, a fishing pier, picnicking facilities, and boat ramp.
