= Lotus Lake (Michigan) =

Lake in the state of Michigan, United States

- Location within Michigan Location within the United States
- Location: Oakland County, Michigan
- Coordinates: 42°41′42″N 83°25′30″W
- Type: Lake
- Basin countries: United States
- Surface area: 185 acres (75 ha)
- Max. depth: 65 ft (20 m)
- Surface elevation: 965 ft (294 m)
- Islands: one
- Settlements: Waterford Township and Independence Township

Lotus Lake is an all-sports, 185-acre (75 ha) Oakland County, Michigan lake along the Clinton River. Most of the lake lies within Waterford Township, however the northern portion of the lake is in Independence Township.

Lotus Lake connects with the 234-acre (95 ha) Maceday Lake to the north, and connects upstream with 12-acre (4.9 ha) Lester Lake. Boaters can get from Lotus Lake to Lester Lake only by way of a narrow culvert under the railroad tracks. Blain Island lies between Lotus Lake and Maceday Lake. It is accessible by car via a bridge. There are three bridges on the island, affectionately named Lloyd, Beau and Jeff by the residents. There are mostly high-end luxury homes on the island.

There is a public boat launch on Maceday Lake which allows boaters to easily access Lotus Lake.

== Name ==
Lotus Lake is named for the Lotus flower. The flower is a water lily and can be seen among the lily pads on the lake.

== Depot ==
In 1851, the Detroit and Milwaukee Railway came through Waterford Township and in so doing made the lakes of the area, including Lotus Lake, easily accessible to summer vacationers from the big cities.

The Windiate depot, along with the Waterford depot, the Drayton Plains depot and the Clarkston depot served to make Waterford Township and Independence Township a resort area.

== Resort ==
The Windiate Park Hotel was a summer resort for vacationers from Detroit and Lansing. The resort was easily accessed by four trains a day during the summer months from the 1890s to the 1940s and was located on Lotus Lake near the Windiate depot. It featured boating, fishing, sailing, sunbathing, tennis and a dance hall. The resort was owned by J.D. and M.L. Rice.

== Fish ==
Fish in Lotus Lake include pumpkinseed sunfish, largemouth bass, walleye, northern pike and crappie.
