= Williams Lake (Michigan) =

Lake in the state of Michigan, United States

- Location within Michigan
- Location: Oakland County, Michigan
- Coordinates: 42°40′27″N 83°25′32″W
- Type: Lake
- Basin countries: United States
- Surface area: 155 acres (63 ha)
- Max. depth: 45 ft (14 m)
- Surface elevation: 965 ft (294 m)
- Settlements: Waterford Township

Williams Lake is a 155-acre (63 ha) all-sports lake in Waterford Township in Oakland County, Michigan in the Clinton River watershed.

The lake lies north of the Oakland County International Airport, to the west of Airport Road, and to the south and east of Williams Lake Road.

Williams Lake connects upstream to Maceday Lake.

== Namesake ==
Williams Lake was named for Ferdinand Williams, who, in 1829, was the first to settle on Williams Lake. Ferdinand was the son of John R. Williams, the first mayor of Detroit, Michigan.

== Fish ==
Fish in Williams Lake include bluegill, largemouth bass, perch, northern pike and crappie.
