= Tommys Lake (Michigan) =

Lake in the state of Michigan, United States

- Location within Michigan Location within the United States
- Location: Orion Township, Michigan
- Coordinates: 42°45′43″N 83°16′26″W
- Type: Lake
- Basin countries: United States
- Surface area: 42 acres (17 ha)
- Surface elevation: 984 ft (300 m)
- Settlements: Orion Township, Michigan

Tommys Lake is a private 42-acre (17 ha) lake in Orion Township in Oakland County, Michigan, United States.

The lake is located off of Clarkston Road just east of Joslyn Road.

On the east shore of Tommys Lake is Camp Agawam. The camp was a Boy Scout camp founded in 1918 by the Boy Scouts of America's (B.S.A.) Clinton Valley Council. The 140-acre (57 ha) camp served as a summer camp and weekend campout location for countless scouts in Oakland County until being sold by the B.S.A.'s Michigan Crossroads Council to Orion Township in 2014. The camp and lake now host numerous events and activities throughout the year for both Scouts and community members alike.

== Fish ==
Tommys Lake fish include perch, pumpkinseed sunfish and largemouth bass
