= White Lake (White Lake Township, Michigan) =

Lake in the state of Michigan, United States

- Location within Michigan Location within the United States
- Location: Oakland County, Michigan
- Coordinates: 42°40′10″N 83°33′56″W
- Type: Lake
- Basin countries: United States
- Surface area: 540 acres (220 ha)
- Max. depth: 32 ft (9.8 m)
- Surface elevation: 1,017 ft (310 m)
- Settlements: White Lake Township

White Lake is an all-sports, 540-acre (220 ha) lake in White Lake Township, Michigan.

It is the sixth largest lake in Oakland County.

Potawatomi, Chippewa and Ottawa Native Americans lived, traveled and camped in this area including on the shores of White Lake which they called “white” or “clear” and that is where the name of the lake and township originated.
