= Lake Orion (Michigan) =

Lake in the state of Michigan, United States

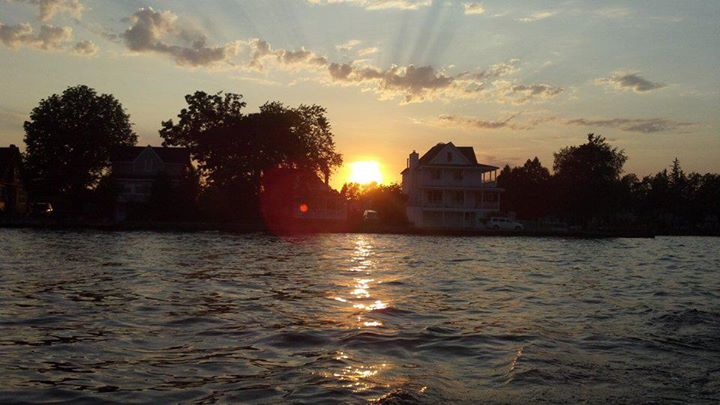
- Lake Orion

- Location within Michigan Location within the United States
- Location: Lake Orion, Michigan
- Coordinates: 42°46′52″N 83°15′04″W
- Type: Lake
- Basin countries: United States
- Surface area: 495.5 acres (200.5 ha)
- Max. depth: 80 ft (24 m)
- Surface elevation: 981 ft (299 m)
- Settlements: Village of Lake Orion, Michigan

Lake Orion is an all-sports, 495.5-acre (200.5 ha) lake in Orion Township in Oakland County, Michigan. It has a maximum depth of 80 feet (24 m). The lake is located within the Village of Lake Orion and Orion Township. It is the eighth largest lake by area in Oakland County, Michigan.

The current area of the lake was formed by a collection of smaller lakes over time, beginning with the damming of Paint Creek in the 1830s. Canals have also been dredged to maximize lake frontage.

There is a public access boat launch on the northern side of the lake. It is administered by the Michigan Department of Natural Resources.

== Islands ==
There are several islands in Lake Orion, some of which feature seasonal and year-round residences. The largest islands, Bellevue and Park, are connected to the mainland by two-lane bridges and are populated year-round. Most boats can pass under the Bellevue Bridge, which has a clearance of 9.6 feet (2.9 m). The Park Island bridge has a lower clearance that allows only canoes, kayaks and rowboats to pass underneath. The remaining islands are reachable only by watercraft. Victoria Island is the third largest island, and is home to several seasonal and year-round homes. A smaller island, Squaw Island, was home to a single residence from the 1850s to the 1950s. Little remains of the island due to erosion save for a solitary tree, and the shallow waters can be a hazard to boaters. Sweet's Island is home to the Lake Orion Boat Club, and features a private boathouse and docks for LOBC members. Romance Island is home to a single cottage, Preston Island to two seasonal cottages, Dot Island to one seasonal cottage and Armada Island to four seasonal cottages. The residences on all islands except for Bellevue and Park require the use of watercraft to travel to and from the mainland.

== Related ==
- List of lakes of Oakland County, Michigan
