= Crystal Lake (Pontiac, Michigan) =

Lake in the state of Michigan, United States

- Location within Michigan
- Location: Oakland County, Michigan
- Coordinates: 42°37′17″N 83°18′14″W
- Type: Lake
- Basin countries: United States
- Surface area: 83 acres (34 ha)
- Max. depth: 11 ft (3.4 m)
- Surface elevation: 915 ft (279 m)
- Settlements: Pontiac, Michigan

Crystal Lake is a private 83-acre (34 ha) lake along the main branch of the Clinton River in Pontiac in Oakland County, Michigan.

Upstream from Crystal Lake lies 532-acre (215 ha) Sylvan Lake.

Downstream, the Clinton River goes underground in Pontiac near Orchard Lake Road and Bagley Avenue. The river reappears, after being piped under Pontiac for 3,000 feet (910 m), near Union Street and E. Huron Street (M-59), where it winds its way eastward to Auburn Hills and beyond.

Ironically, Crystal Lake was originally named Mud Lake.

== Golf ==
There is a public golf course on Crystal Lake.

== Fish ==
Fish on Crystal Lake include Yellow Perch, Smallmouth Bass and White Perch.
