= Cooley Lake (White Lake Township, Michigan) =

Lake in the state of Michigan, United States

- Location within Michigan
- Location: Oakland County, Michigan
- Coordinates: 42°36′56″N 83°27′09″W
- Type: Lake
- Basin countries: United States
- Surface area: 86 acres (35 ha)
- Max. depth: 55 ft (17 m)
- Surface elevation: 935 ft (285 m)
- Settlements: White Lake Township

Cooley Lake is a private, all-sports, 86-acre (35 ha) Oakland County, Michigan lake located in White Lake Township.

== Namesake ==
Solon Cooley (1830-1881), along with his wife Levantia (1836-1910) and their two children, lived on a 158-acre (64 ha) farm in section 36 of White Lake Township, Michigan, on the shore of the lake that was named for them, Cooley Lake.

Solon was originally from Galen, New York.
