= Rose Township, Oakland County, Michigan =

Rose Township, Michigan
- Civil township
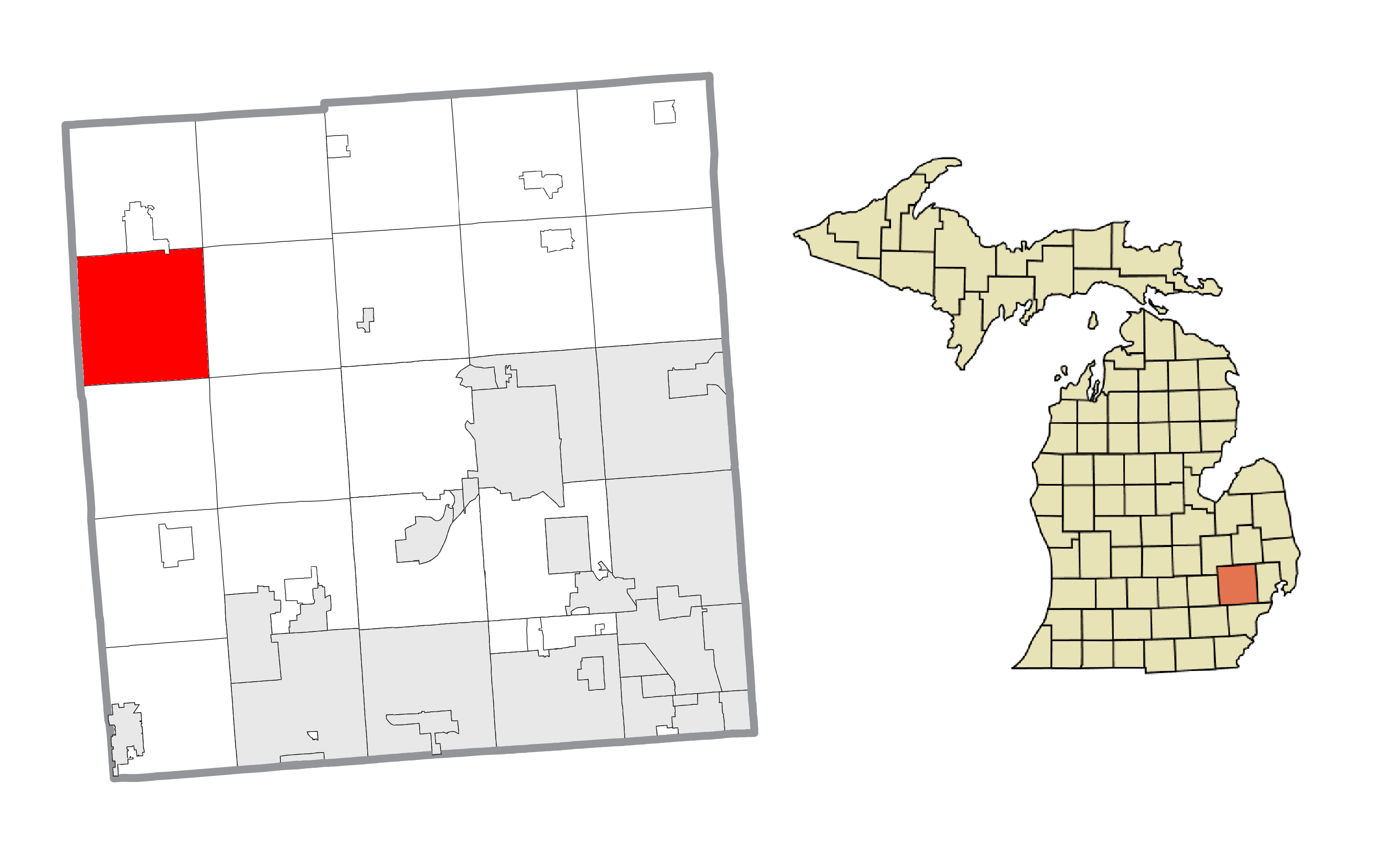
- Location within Oakland County

- Location within the state of Michigan Rose Township (the United States)
- Coordinates: 42°44′34″N 83°37′40″W
- Country: United States
- State: Michigan
- County: Oakland
- Established: 1837

Government
  - Supervisor: Brad Stilwell
  - Clerk: Debbie Miller

Area
  - Civil township: 36.13 sq mi (93.6 km^{2})
  - Land: 34.51 sq mi (89.4 km^{2})
  - Water: 1.62 sq mi (4.2 km^{2})
- Elevation: 991 ft (302 m)

Population (2020)
  - Civil township: 6,188
  - Density: 179.3/sq mi (69.23/km^{2})
  - Metro: 4,296,250 (Metro Detroit)
- Time zone: UTC-5 (Eastern (EST))
  - Summer (DST): UTC-4 (EDT)
- ZIP code(s): 48350 (Davisburg); 48430 (Fenton); 48442 (Holly)
- Area code: 248
- FIPS code: 26-69580
- GNIS feature ID: 1627004
- Website: Official website

Rose Township is a civil township of Oakland County in the U.S. state of Michigan. The population was 6,188 at the 2020 census.

== Communities ==
- Rose Center is located on Milford and Demode Road and previously had a rail station and a post office that opened as Rose on October 17, 1837. The P.O. was renamed to Rose Center on December 16, 1914 until discontinued on December 31, 1949.
- Rose Corners is located at Hickory Ridge and Rose Center Roads (42°44′22″N 83°40′00″W, Elevation: 1020 ft./311 m.).

== Geography ==
According to the United States Census Bureau, the township has a total area of 36.13 square miles (93.58 km^{2}), of which 34.51 square miles (89.38 km^{2}) is land and 1.62 square miles (4.20 km^{2}) (4.48%) is water.

== Demographics ==
As of the census of 2000, there were 6,210 people, 2,144 households, and 1,777 families residing in the township. The population density was 177.3 inhabitants per square mile (68.5/km^{2}). There were 2,277 housing units at an average density of 65.0 per square mile (25.1/km^{2}). The racial makeup of the township was 97.13% White, 0.89% African American, 0.23% Native American, 0.26% Asian, 0.48% from other races, and 1.01% from two or more races. Hispanic or Latino of any race were 2.16% of the population.

There were 2,144 households, out of which 38.2% had children under the age of 18 living with them, 73.4% were married couples living together, 5.6% had a female householder with no husband present, and 17.1% were non-families. 12.5% of all households were made up of individuals, and 3.6% had someone living alone who was 65 years of age or older. The average household size was 2.88 and the average family size was 3.14.

In the township the population was spread out, with 26.5% under the age of 18, 6.7% from 18 to 24, 31.2% from 25 to 44, 28.5% from 45 to 64, and 7.1% who were 65 years of age or older. The median age was 38 years. For every 100 females, there were 104.5 males. For every 100 females age 18 and over, there were 102.8 males.

The median income for a household in the township was $66,401, and the median income for a family was $68,627. Males had a median income of $51,410 versus $36,081 for females. The per capita income for the township was $24,983. About 2.8% of families and 4.6% of the population were below the poverty line, including 6.5% of those under age 18 and 2.3% of those age 65 and over.

== News & Media ==
Rose Township is served by the Tri-County Times for print news, and the Holly Herald-Citizen for online news.
