= Orion Township, Michigan =

Charter township in the United States

- Charter township
- Charter Township of Orion
- Lake Orion in Orion Township

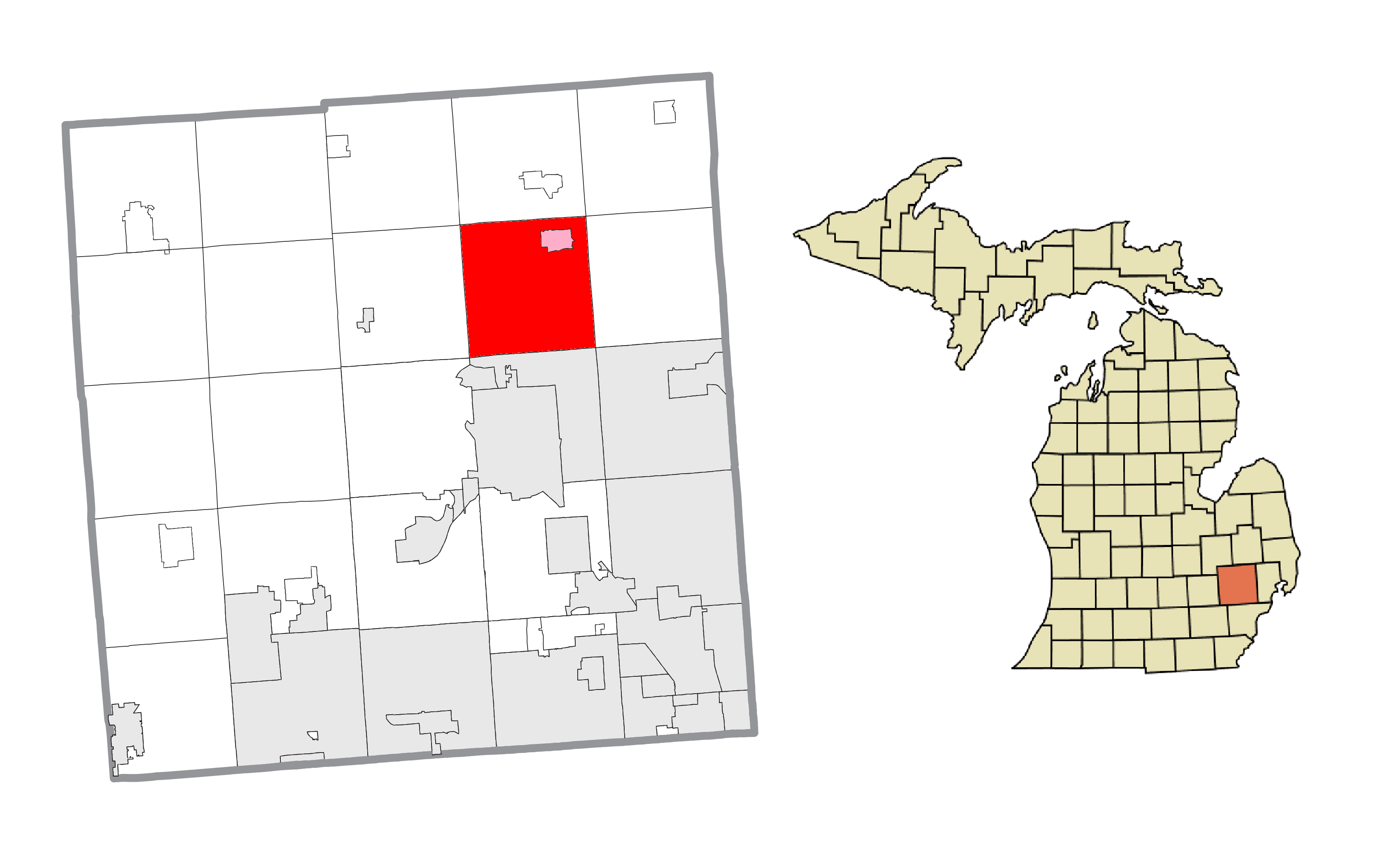
- Location within Oakland County (red) and the administered village of Lake Orion (pink)

- Location within the state of Michigan
- Coordinates: 42°45′56″N 83°16′01″W
- Country: United States
- State: Michigan
- County: Oakland
- Established: 1835

Government
  - Supervisor: Chris Barnett

Area
  - Charter township: 35.9 sq mi (93.1 km^{2})
  - Land: 33.4 sq mi (86.4 km^{2})
  - Water: 2.6 sq mi (6.7 km^{2})
- Elevation: 1,004 ft (306 m)

Population (2020)
  - Charter township: 38,206
  - Density: 1,150/sq mi (442/km^{2})
  - Metro: 4,296,250 (Metro Detroit)
- Time zone: UTC-5 (Eastern (EST))
  - Summer (DST): UTC-4 (EDT)
- ZIP code(s): 48348, 48359–48362
- Area codes: 248 and 947
- FIPS code: 26-61100
- GNIS feature ID: 1626859
- Website: Official website

Orion Charter Township (/ˈɒriən/ ORR-ee-ən) is a charter township of Oakland County, Michigan, United States. The population was 38,206 as of the 2020 census.

The official motto of the township and village is "Where living is a vacation." "Lake Orion" is often used to describe both the village and the township. The township hosts General Motors' Orion Assembly plant which produces small cars and EV pickup trucks.

== Communities ==
Lake Orion is an incorporated village located within Orion Township. The Township has three unincorporated communities:

- Eames began as a station on the railroad in 1874. It was given a post office in 1883.
- Lake Orion Heights is located between Lake Orion, Square Lake, and Elkhorn Lake (42°46′13″N 83°15′51″W Elevation: 1007 ft/307 m).
- Gingellville is located at Baldwin and Gregory Roads (42°43′18″N 83°18′28″W Elevation: 1017 ft/310 m).

Former places include:

- Rudds Mill (also known as Rudds Station) is located at Kern and Clarkston Roads (42°46′04″N 83°13′06″W Elevation: 945 ft/288 m).
- Cole was a station on the Pontiac, Oxford and Northern Railroad. It had a post office from 1884 until 1907.

== Geography ==
According to the United States Census Bureau, the township has a total area of 35.9 square miles (93 km^{2}), of which 33.3 square miles (86 km^{2}) is land and 2.6 square miles (6.7 km^{2}), or 7.18%, is water. The Township boasts more than 4,200 acres of parks and open spaces, including 42 lakes larger than five acres, more than 10 square miles of recreation area, and more than 50 miles of safety paths and trail ways.

Orion Township is bordered to the east by Oakland Township, to the west by Independence Township, to the south by Auburn Hills, and to the north by Oxford Township.

== Parks, Trails, and Attractions ==
- Friendship Park is the largest Township-owned property with 134.97 acres of land. It is located at the intersection of Baldwin and Clarkston Roads with access from Clarkston Road.
- Camp Agawam is located on Clarkston Road east of Joslyn Road. The camp was previously owned and operated by the Boy Scouts of America, until 2014 at which point Orion Township took ownership.
- Civic Center Park is a 78.86 acre community park located on Joslyn Road north of Waldon Road with access from both roadways.
- Jesse Decker Park, constructed in 2009, is the newest Orion Township community park. It is located in the southeast corner of the Township on Squirrel Road south of Silverbell Road.
- Wildwood Amphitheater hosts a "Free Concerts & Movies in the Park" series that take place throughout the summer. The venue also hosts outdoor film festivals, music festivals, outdoor movies, and other public events.
- The Paint Creek Trail is an 8.9 mile recreational trail located in northeast Oakland County. It traverses through Rochester, Rochester Hills, Oakland Township, Orion Township, and the Village of Lake Orion. Most of the trail is surfaced with crushed limestone and is 8 feet wide. A 1/4 mile segment at the northern terminus in Lake Orion is paved with asphalt.
- The Polly Ann Trail is a major non-motorized trail in Oakland County extending north from Orion Township on a former Pontiac, Oxford, and Northern Railroad corridor. The Oakland County Polly Ann ends on Bordman Road at the Lapeer/Oakland County border. The Oakland County segment connects the Townships of Orion, Oxford and Addison and the Villages of Oxford and Leonard. The Orion Township pathway system connects the trail to the Paint Creek Trail.

== Demographics ==
As of the census of 2000, there were 33,463 people, 12,246 households, and 8,976 families residing in the township. The population density was 1,003.3 inhabitants per square mile (387.4/km^{2}). There were 12,837 housing units at an average density of 384.9 per square mile (148.6/km^{2}).

There were 12,246 households, out of which 39.7% had children under the age of 18 living with them, 63.0% were married couples living together, 6.9% had a female householder with no husband present, and 26.7% were non-families. 20.8% of all households were made up of single individuals, and 4.0% had someone living alone who was 65 years of age or older. The average household size was 2.71 and the average family size was 3.19.

The 2000 census reports that 28.5% of residents were under the age of 18, 7.3% were 18 to 24, 36.4% were 25 to 44, 21.7% were 45 to 64, and 6.2% were 65 years of age or older. The median age was 34 years. For every 100 females, there were 102.8 males. For every 100 females age 18 and over, there were 100.5 males.

The median income for a household in the township was $71,844, and the median income for a family was $83,514. Males had a median income of $61,562 versus $36,481 for females. The per capita income for the township was $30,299. About 2.0% of families and 3.2% of the population were below the poverty line, including 3.5% of those under age 18 and 4.1% of those age 65 and over.

== Education ==
The majority of students attend Lake Orion Community Schools. A small portion of the township is in the Pontiac School District. Another portion of students also attend Clarkston, Rochester, and Oxford Community School Districts.

St. Joseph Catholic School is located in the township.

== Notable people ==
The following list includes people from Orion Township and the Village of Lake Orion.

- Keith Aldridge, former professional hockey player
- Scott Amedure, The Jenny Jones Show murder victim
- Matthew Blackmer, American pair skater
- Christopher Bowman, World Medalist champion figure skater
- William Broomfield, former congressman
- Pat Caputo, sportswriter for The Oakland Press
- Louis George Carpenter, College Professor, known for scientific irrigation
- Rolla C. Carpenter, engineer, academic, writer
- Dave Collins, former professional baseball player
- Barbara Ann Crancer, daughter of Jimmy Hoffa
- Matthew Dear, musician
- Andrew J. Feustel, NASA astronaut
- Frontier Ruckus, art-folk band
- Tom Gillis, professional golfer
- Jeff Heath, professional football player
- Frederick Henderson, former CEO of General Motors
- James P. Hoffa, son of Jimmy Hoffa
- Jimmy Hoffa, former Teamsters President
- Zak Keasey, former professional football player
- Mickey Lolich, former professional baseball player
- James Marcinkowski, politician, attorney
- Chris Michels, syndicated radio show host
- Jamie Milam, professional hockey player
- Troy Milam, professional hockey player
- Frank Novak, former NFL coach
- Raymond Plouhar, staff sergeant, USMC
- William Edmund Scripps, newspaper magnate
- Rich Strenger, former professional football player
- Rod Taylor, former professional hockey player
- Ron Tripp, World Sambo and Judo champion
- Cynthia Watros, actress
- Mike Weger, former professional football player

== See also ==
- List of cities, villages, and townships in Michigan
