= Cass Lake (Michigan) =

Lake in the state of Michigan, United States

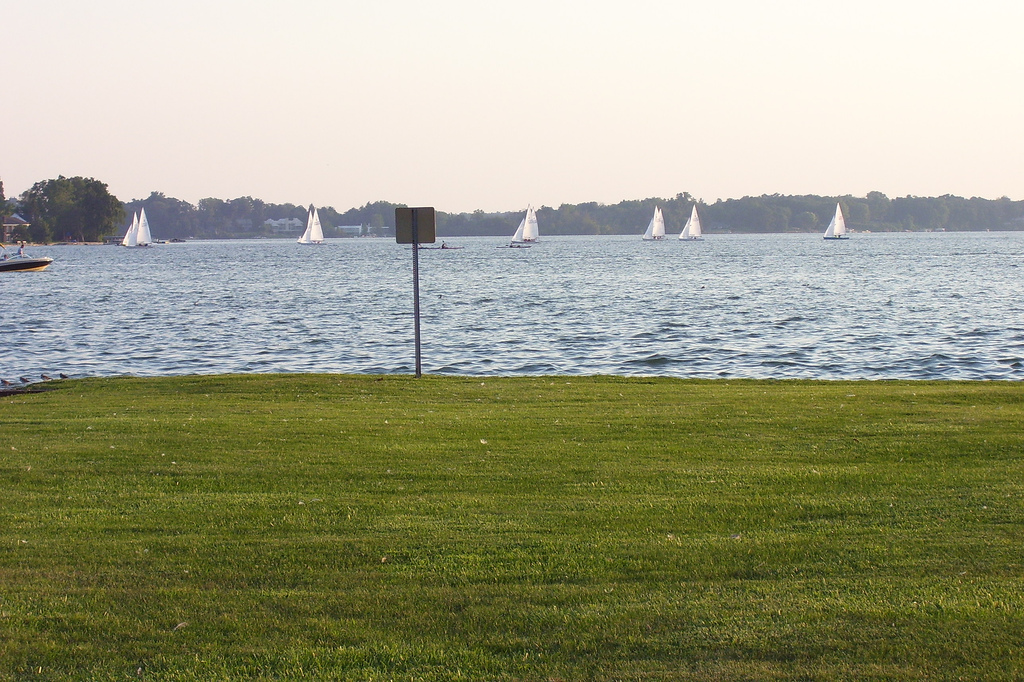

- Location within Michigan Location within the United States
- Location: Oakland County, Michigan
- Coordinates: 42°36′25″N 83°21′56″W
- Type: Lake
- Basin countries: United States
- Surface area: 1,280 acres (520 ha)
- Max. depth: 123 ft (37 m)
- Surface elevation: 928 ft (283 m)
- Settlements: Waterford Township, West Bloomfield Township, Orchard Lake Village, Keego Harbor

Cass Lake is on the main branch of the Clinton River.

Upstream from Cass Lake is 243-acre (98 ha) Loon Lake. Cass Lake also connects with 363-acre (147 ha) Elizabeth Lake & the small Dow Lake, in Dow Ridge.

Downstream from Cass Lake is the 532-acre (215 ha) Sylvan Lake.

Cass Lake is the largest and deepest lake in Oakland County, and is in the northern Metro Detroit region of southeastern Michigan.

== Namesake ==
Cass Lake was named after former Michigan governor Lewis Cass.

== Geography ==
Cass Lake covers 1,280 acres (520 ha) and has a maximum depth of 123 feet (37 m).

It is bordered by the cities, villages, and townships of Waterford Township, West Bloomfield Township, Cass Lake, Orchard Lake Village, and Keego Harbor.

=== Recreation ===
It is a popular public lake in the Metro Detroit region. The lake is home to the Pontiac Yacht Club.

Dodge No. 4 State Park is located on northeastern Cass Lake, with access via West Bloomfield Township and Waterford Township.

== See also ==
- List of places named for Lewis Cass
- Detroit Finnish Co-operative Summer Camp — had property on Cass Lake also.
- List of lakes in Michigan
