= Holly Township, Michigan =

- Civil township
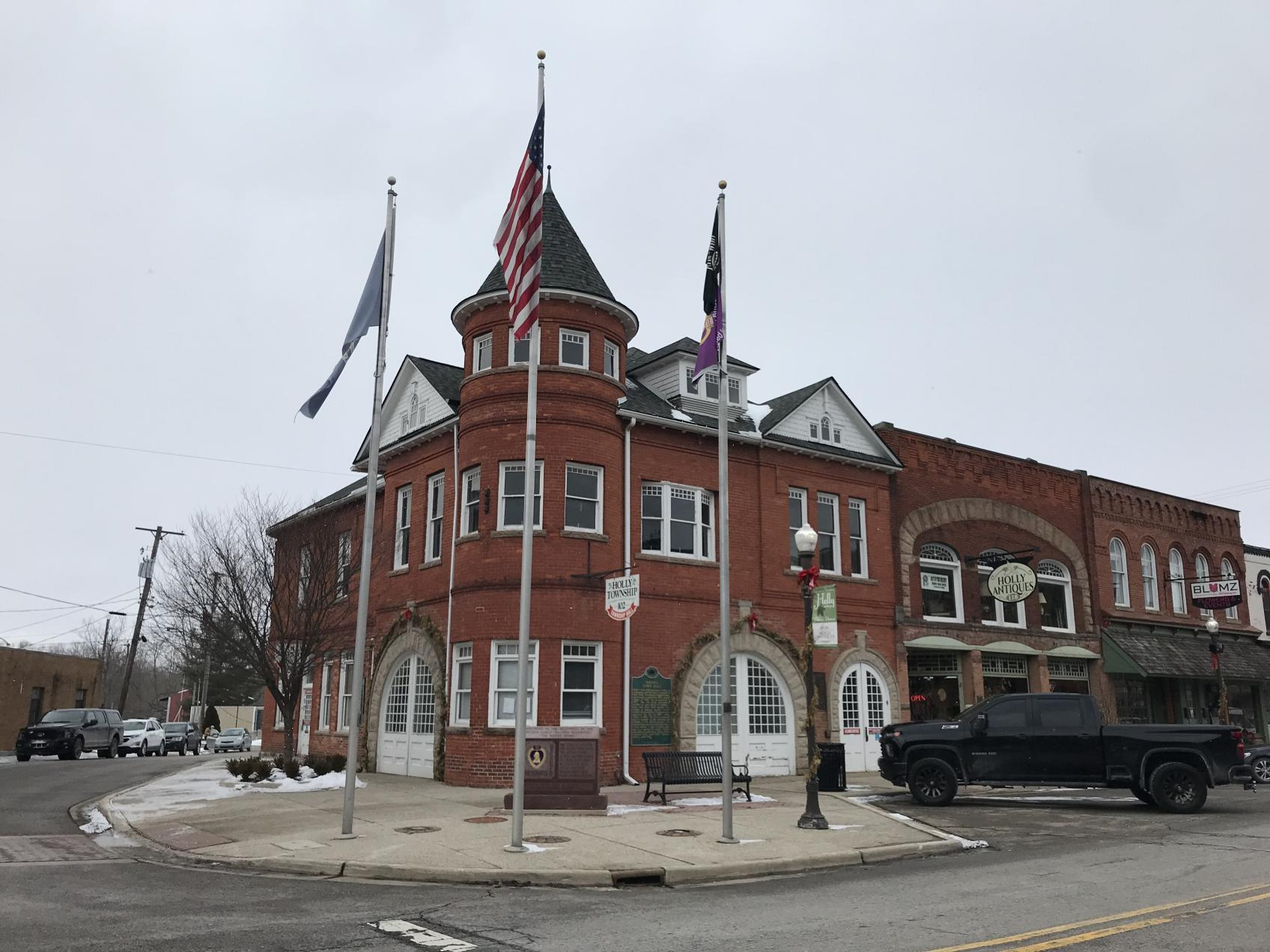
- Holly Township Hall in the village of Holly
- Motto: "Up North in Oakland County"
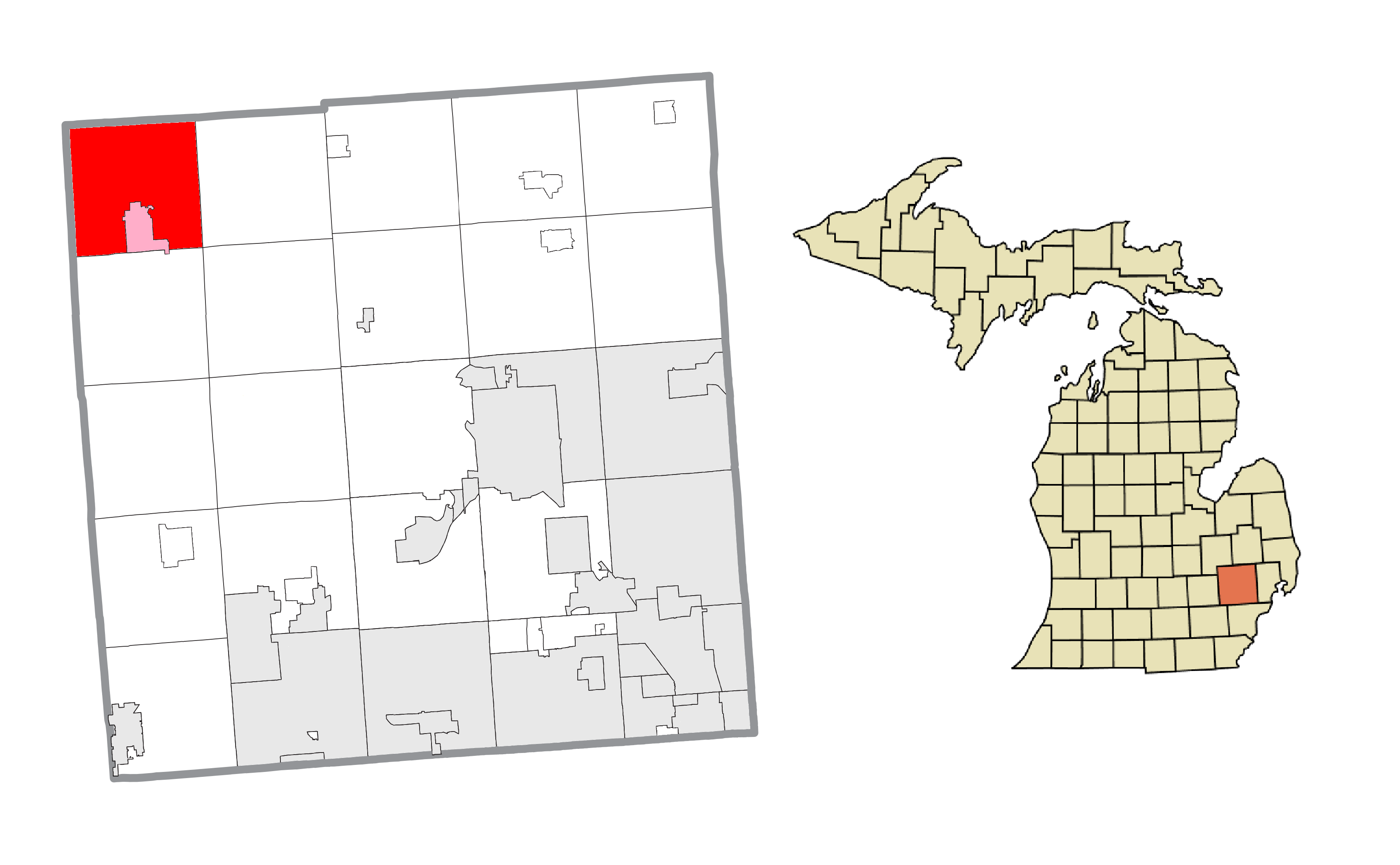
- Location within Oakland County (red) and the administered village of Holly (pink)

- Location within the state of Michigan Holly Township (the United States)
- Coordinates: 42°48′41″N 83°37′30″W
- Country: United States
- State: Michigan
- County: Oakland
- Established: 1838

Government
  - Supervisor: George Kullis
  - Clerk: Karin Winchester

Area
  - Civil township: 36.42 sq mi (94.3 km^{2})
  - Land: 34.38 sq mi (89.0 km^{2})
  - Water: 1.94 sq mi (5.0 km^{2})
- Elevation: 922 ft (281 m)

Population (2020)
  - Civil township: 12,006
  - Density: 349.2/sq mi (134.8/km^{2})
  - Metro: 4,296,250 (Metro Detroit)
- Time zone: UTC-5 (Eastern (EST))
  - Summer (DST): UTC-4 (EDT)
- ZIP code(s): 48442 (Holly)
- Area codes: 248 and 810
- FIPS code: 26-38720
- GNIS feature ID: 1626480
- Website: Official website

Holly Township is a civil township of Oakland County in the U.S. state of Michigan. The population was 12,006 at the 2020 census.

== Communities ==
- The village of Holly is located within the township.

In addition to the incorporated village in the Township, there are two unincorporated communities within the Township:

- Newark is located in the northern part of the township at the rail tracks and Belford Road (42°51′36″N 83°37′31″W).
- Five Points is adjacent to Holly Village on Rood and Grange Hall Roads just south of where Quick and Fagan Roads merger to become Rood Road (42°48′50″N 83°36′37″W Elevation: 928 ft./283 m.).

== History ==
Holly was the last of Oakland County's townships to be organized. It was organized on 6 March 1838.

Holly's oldest cemetery, Oak Hill Cemetery, was established around Holly's incorporation as a Township. There are veterans from every major war interred at Oak Hill, dating back to the Revolutionary War. Many of the founding families of the Holly area are also buried at Oak Hill, as well as Holly's historic 'sister cemetery', Lakeside Cemetery.

Around 1900 Holly reached the pinnacle of socioeconomic growth. Having taken full advantage of the booming rail industry, Holly found itself at the hub of rail transit between Flint, Pontiac and Saginaw, as well as east–west transit from Lansing to Port Huron. To this day trains have a profound effect on Holly's economy and social life.

== Geography ==
According to the United States Census Bureau, the township has a total area of 36.42 square miles (94.33 km^{2}), of which 34.48 square miles (89.30 km^{2}) is land and 1.94 square miles (5.02 km^{2}) (5.33%) is water.

== Demographics ==
As of the census of 2000, there were 10,037 people, 3,733 households, and 2,639 families residing in the township. The population density was 288.2 inhabitants per square mile (111.3/km^{2}). There were 3,926 housing units at an average density of 112.7 per square mile (43.5/km^{2}). The racial makeup of the township was 94.51% White, 2.20% African American, 0.46% Native American, 0.42% Asian, 0.04% Pacific Islander, 0.83% from other races, and 1.54% from two or more races. Hispanic or Latino of any race were 2.88% of the population.

There were 3,733 households, out of which 35.6% had children under the age of 18 living with them, 56.4% were married couples living together, 9.5% had a female householder with no husband present, and 29.3% were non-families. 23.6% of all households were made up of individuals, and 9.5% had someone living alone who was 65 years of age or older. The average household size was 2.63 and the average family size was 3.14.

In the township the population was spread out, with 26.6% under the age of 18, 8.0% from 18 to 24, 33.9% from 25 to 44, 21.0% from 45 to 64, and 10.5% who were 65 years of age or older. The median age was 35 years. For every 100 females, there were 98.8 males. For every 100 females age 18 and over, there were 97.0 males.

The median income for a household in the township was $52,865, and the median income for a family was $60,783. Males had a median income of $46,943 versus $28,535 for females. The per capita income for the township was $22,370. About 4.6% of families and 7.6% of the population were below the poverty line, including 9.1% of those under age 18 and 9.3% of those age 65 or over.

== Tourism ==
Holly Township is also home to the Great Lakes National Cemetery. Accessible recreation areas include Seven Lakes State Park, Holly Recreation Area, Groveland Oaks, Rose Oaks, Lakeside Park, Ganshaw Park and Holdridge Lakes Mountain Bike Trails.

Those looking for campgrounds may find outdoor locations provided by Seven Lakes State Park and Groveland Oaks. Popular events for campers include Holly's regionally accredited Independence Day Celebration and Michigan Renaissance Festival.

== News and media ==
Holly Township is served by the Tri-County Times for print news.
