= Rolla C. Carpenter =

American engineer, academic, and writer

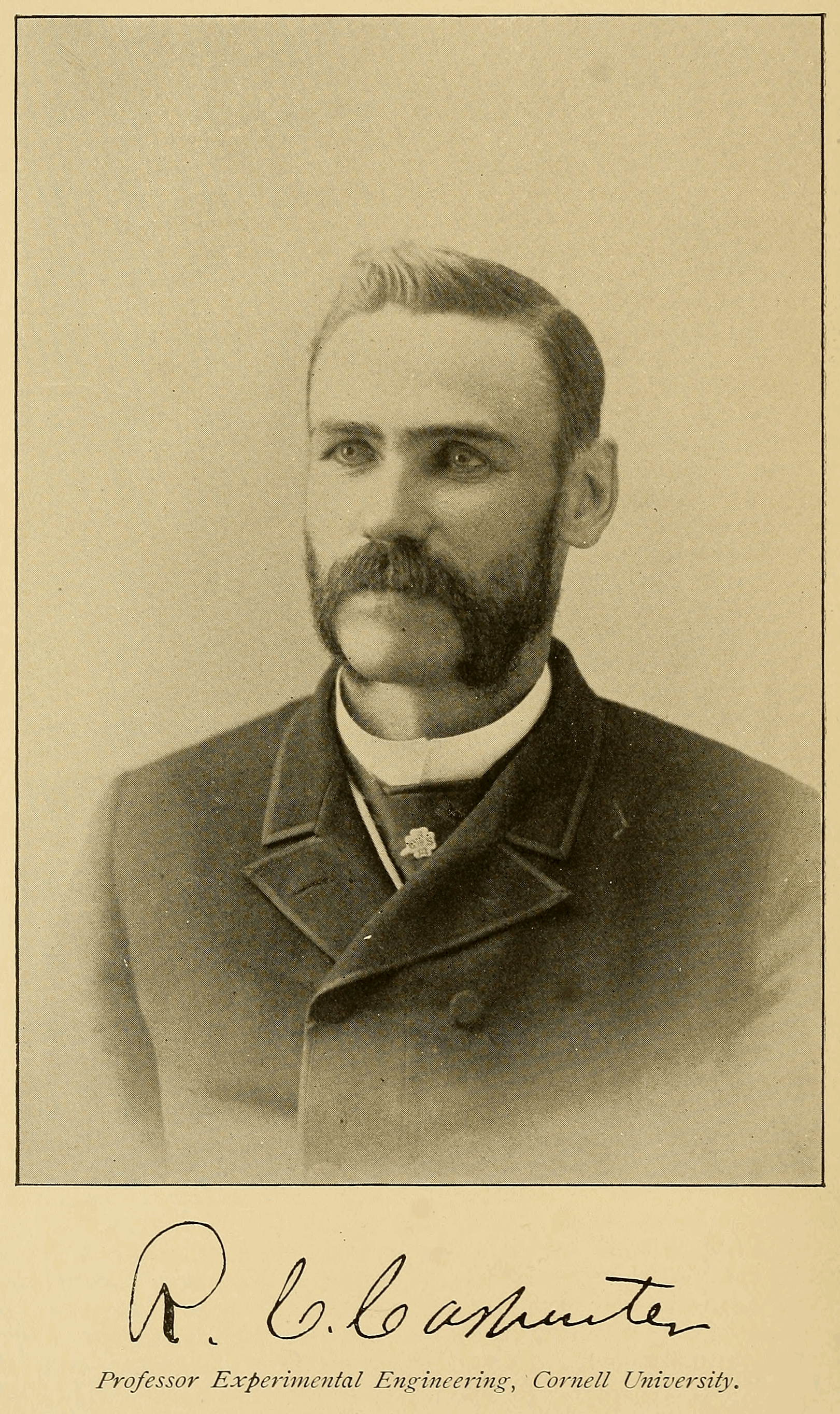
Carpenter was portrayed in Cassier's Magazine, January 1892.

Rolla Clinton Carpenter C.E. M.M.E. LL.D. (June 26, 1852 – January 19, 1919) was an American engineer, academic, and writer.

Carpenter was born in Orion (now Lake Orion), Michigan. He earned a B.S. in 1873 from Michigan State Agricultural College (today, Michigan State University) and later received additional bachelor's and master's degrees from the University of Michigan in 1875. From 1875 to 1890 he was professor of mathematics and civil engineering in the Michigan State Agricultural College; while there, he designed and supervised much of the construction at the young school. In 1887, he and Professor William J. Beal laid out "Collegeville", the first neighborhood in what later became the city of East Lansing, Michigan.

He was appointed to a position at Cornell University in 1890. He served as a judge of machinery and transportation at the World's Columbian Exposition in 1893. He was president of the American Society of Heating and Ventilating Engineers in 1898. He was awarded an honorary Doctorate of Laws by the Michigan State Agricultural College in 1907.

In addition to numerous scientific papers, he published:

- Heating and Ventilating Buildings: a Manual for Heating Engineers and Architects (1891)
- Instructions for Mechanical Laboratory Practice: Text-Book of Experimental Engineering (1892)
- Internal Combustion Engines: Their Theory, Construction and Operation (1908) (co-author)

Carpenter died at his home in Ithaca, New York, at the age of 66.
