= Milford Township, Michigan =

- Charter township
- Charter Township of Milford
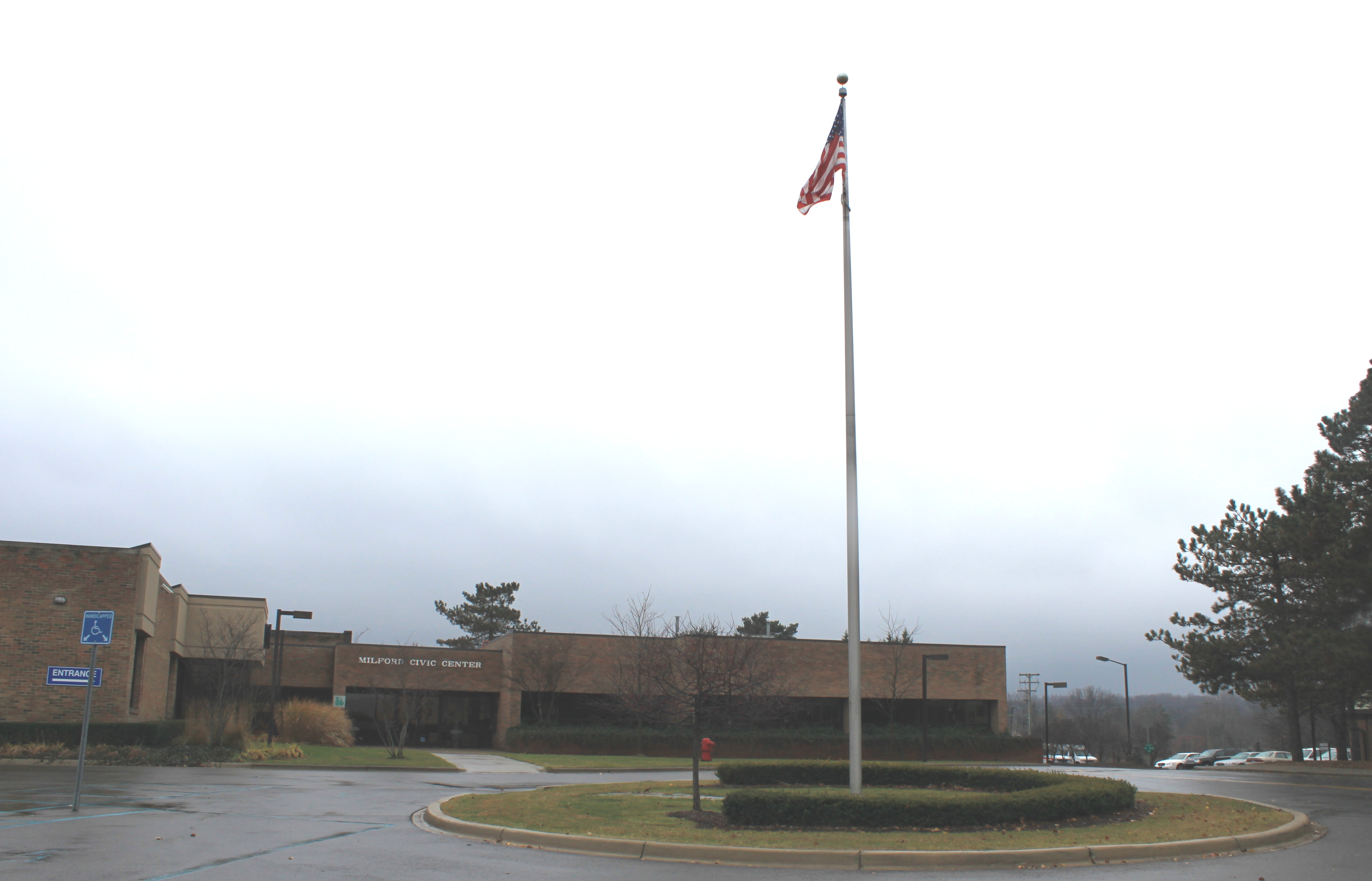
- Milford Civic Center

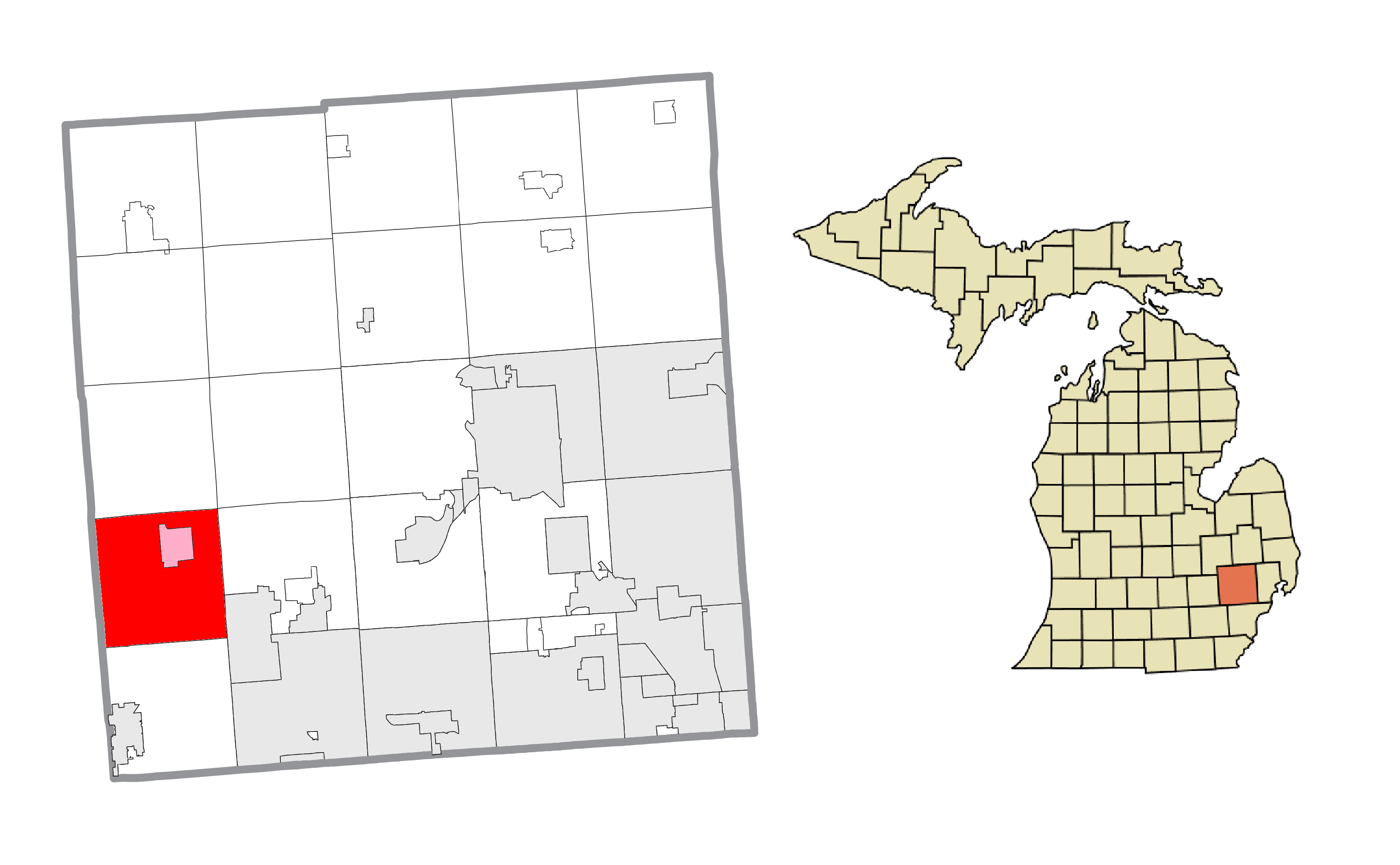
- Location within Oakland County (red) and the administered village of Milford (pink)

- Location within the state of Michigan
- Coordinates: 42°34′36″N 83°36′11″W
- Country: United States
- State: Michigan
- County: Oakland

Government
  - Supervisor: Donald Green

Area
  - Charter township: 35.2 sq mi (91.1 km^{2})
  - Land: 33.3 sq mi (86.2 km^{2})
  - Water: 1.9 sq mi (4.9 km^{2})
- Elevation: 980 ft (300 m)

Population (2020)
  - Charter township: 17,090
  - Density: 513/sq mi (198/km^{2})
  - Metro: 4,296,250 (Metro Detroit)
- Time zone: UTC-5 (Eastern (EST))
  - Summer (DST): UTC-4 (EDT)
- ZIP code(s): 48380, 48381
- Area codes: 248
- FIPS code: 26-53980
- GNIS feature ID: 1626741
- Website: Official website

Milford Township is a charter township of Oakland County in the U.S. state of Michigan. The population was 17,090 at the 2020 census. The village of Milford is located within the township.

== Geography ==
According to the United States Census Bureau, the township has a total area of 35.2 square miles (91 km^{2}), of which 33.3 square miles (86 km^{2}) is land and 1.9 square miles (4.9 km^{2}), or 5.37%, is water.

== Demographics ==
As of the census of 2000, there were 15,271 people, 5,470 households, and 4,261 families residing in the township. The population density was 458.6 inhabitants per square mile (177.1/km^{2}). There were 5,650 housing units at an average density of 169.7 per square mile (65.5/km^{2}). The racial makeup of the township was 97.47% White, 0.43% African American, 0.28% Native American, 0.46% Asian, 0.29% from other races, and 1.09% from two or more races. Hispanic or Latino of any race were 1.19% of the population.

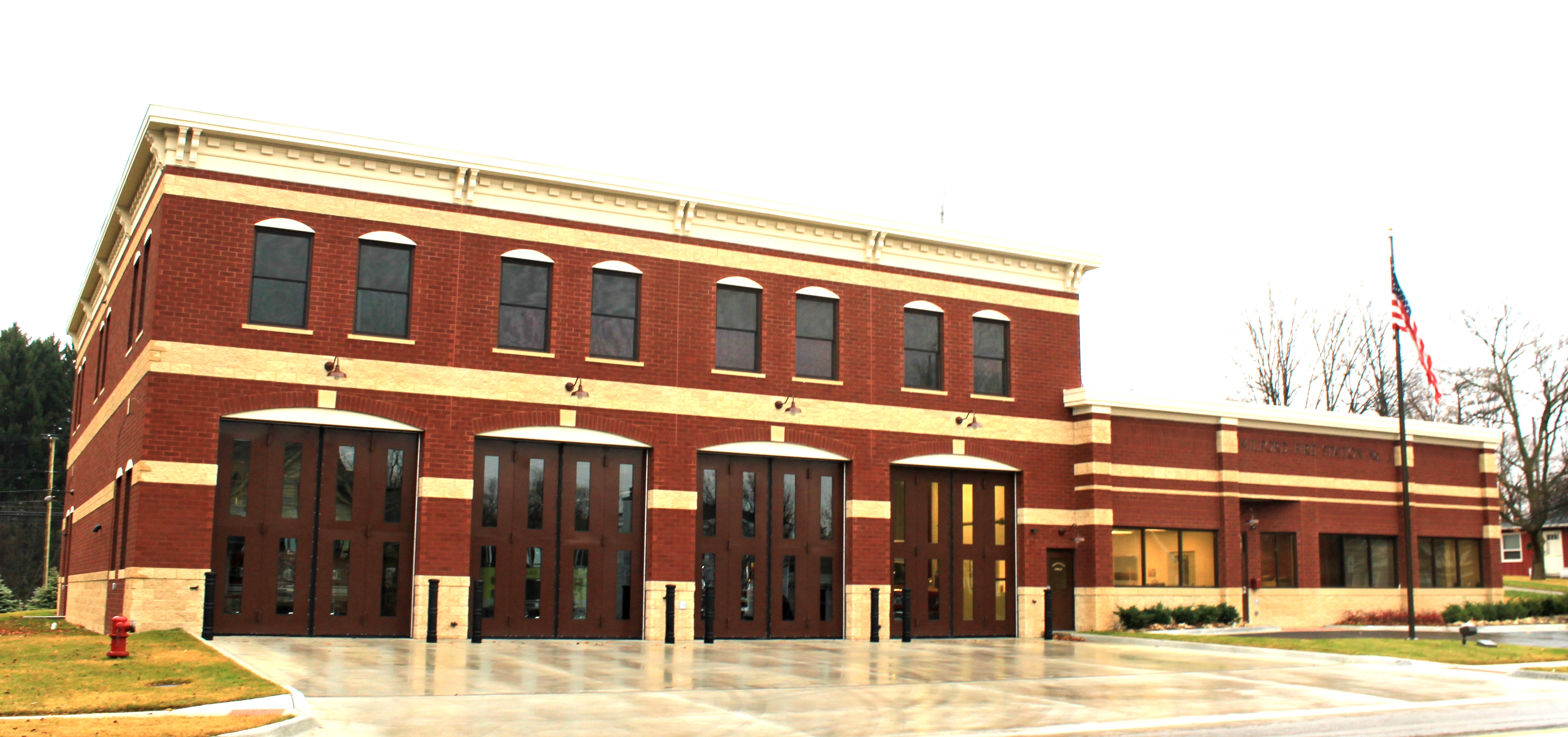
Fire Station No. 1

There were 5,470 households, out of which 40.3% had children under the age of 18 living with them, 65.1% were married couples living together, 9.7% had a female householder with no husband present, and 22.1% were non-families. 18.4% of all households were made up of individuals, and 5.9% had someone living alone who was 65 years of age or older. The average household size was 2.76 and the average family size was 3.15.

In the township the population was spread out, with 28.5% under the age of 18, 6.2% from 18 to 24, 30.7% from 25 to 44, 25.4% from 45 to 64, and 9.2% who were 65 years of age or older. The median age was 37 years. For every 100 females, there were 96.3 males. For every 100 females age 18 and over, there were 90.9 males.

The median income for a household in the township was $67,672, and the median income for a family was $78,463. Males had a median income of $60,075 versus $32,619 for females. The per capita income for the township was $29,913. About 3.8% of families and 5.3% of the population were below the poverty line, including 7.3% of those under age 18 and 2.0% of those age 65 or over.

2020 Census

As of the census of 2020, there were 17,090 people, 6,500 households, and approximately 4,800 families living in the township. The population density was about 600.3 inhabitants per square mile (231.7/km²). There were around 6,900 housing units at an average density of 242.5 per square mile (93.6/km²). The racial makeup of the township was 90.2% White, 1.3% African American, 0.3% Native American, 1.5% Asian, 0.7% from other races, and 6.0% from two or more races. Hispanic or Latino of any race were 3.7% of the population.

There were approximately 6,500 households, of which 28.0% had children under the age of 18 living with them, 58.0% were married couples living together, 9.5% had a female householder with no husband present, 3.5% had a male householder with no wife present, and 25.0% were non-families. About 21.0% of all households were made up of individuals, and 9.0% had someone living alone who was 65 years of age or older. The average household size was 2.62 and the average family size was 3.08.

The median age in the township was 44.2 years. 24.4% of residents were under the age of 18; 6.5% were between the ages of 18 and 24; 23.5% were from 25 to 44; 25.6% were from 45 to 64; and 20.0% were 65 years of age or older. The sex makeup of the township was approximately 50.2% male and 49.8% female.
