= Silver Lake (Waterford Township, Michigan) =

Lake in the state of Michigan, United States

- Location within Michigan Location within the United States
- Location: Oakland County, Michigan
- Coordinates: 42°40′41″N 83°20′25″W
- Type: freshwater lake
- Basin countries: United States
- Surface area: 101 acres (41 ha)
- Max. depth: 73 ft (22 m)
- Surface elevation: 948 ft (289 m)
- Settlements: Waterford Township

Silver Lake is a freshwater lake located in Waterford Township, Michigan in Oakland County, Michigan, United States.

The lake is located south of Walton Blvd., north of Silver Lake Road, and east of Dixie Highway.

Silver Lake is located on the Clinton River watershed. Silver lake connects with Loon Lake to the west and with Upper Silver Lake (35.5 acres) to the east.

The sand-bottom lake is 101 acres (41 ha).

At its deepest point, the lake is 73 feet (22 m) deep, making it the ninth deepest lake in Oakland County.

== Historical significance ==
In 1818, Major and Mrs. Oliver Williams and their eight children set out to settle Oakland County along with Mr. and Mrs. Alpheus Williams, their four daughters and two sons, and Captain Archibald Phillips. Major Williams and his family established the first farm settlement in the county on the south shore of Silver Lake. Their farm was the first farm settlement on the Saginaw Trail.

In 1821, the first school in Oakland County was started in the loft of Oliver Williams' sheep barn on the banks of Silver Lake. There were seven students.

In 1822, the first schoolhouse built of logs on Oliver Williams farm, south of Silver Lake. This was first school building in Oakland County and had 13 students.

== Surroundings ==
Silver Lake is surrounded by heavily wooded residential neighborhoods on all sides of the lake. There is a private boat ramp off of Walton Blvd.

== Fish ==
Silver Lake contains a variety of fish, including black crappie, bluegill, largemouth bass, rock bass, smallmouth bass, spotted gar, sunfish, black bullhead, snakehead, common carp and yellow perch.
