= Springfield Township, Oakland County, Michigan =

Springfield Township, Michigan
- Charter township
- Springfield Charter Township
- Motto: "Come Home to Springfield Township"
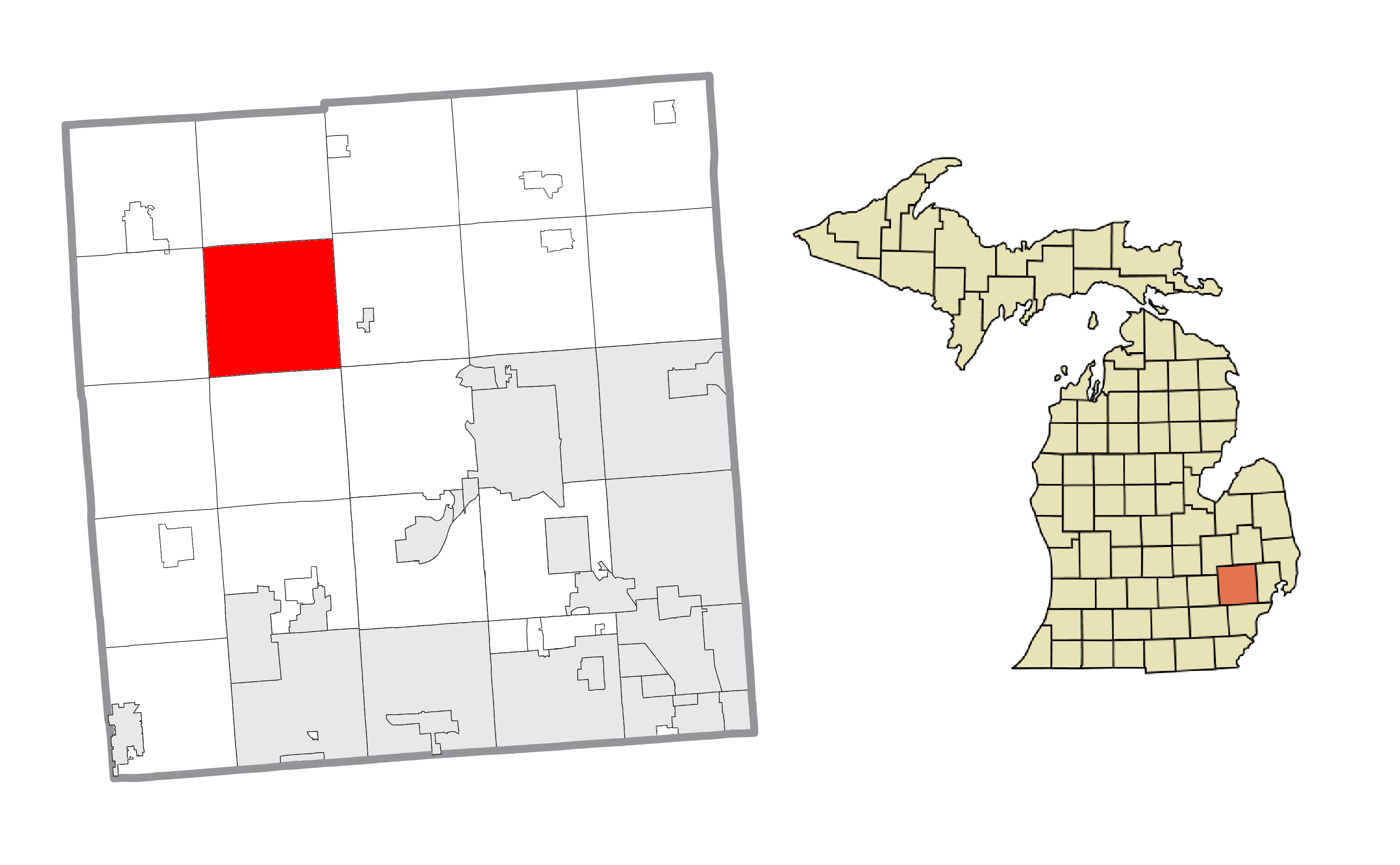
- Location within Oakland County

- Location within the state of Michigan
- Coordinates: 42°45′06″N 83°30′00″W
- Country: United States
- State: Michigan
- County: Oakland
- Established: 1836

Government
  - Supervisor: Richard L. Davis
  - Clerk: Sean R. Miller
  - Treasurer: Jamie L. Dubre

Area
  - Charter township: 36.8 sq mi (95.2 km^{2})
  - Land: 35.6 sq mi (92.2 km^{2})
  - Water: 1.2 sq mi (3.0 km^{2})
- Elevation: 1,020 ft (310 m)

Population (2020)
  - Charter township: 14,703
  - Density: 413/sq mi (159/km^{2})
  - Metro: 4,296,250 (Metro Detroit)
- Time zone: UTC-5 (Eastern (EST))
  - Summer (DST): UTC-4 (EDT)
- ZIP code(s): 48346, 48348, 48350, 48442
- Area code: 248
- FIPS code: 26-75760
- GNIS feature ID: 1627110
- Website: springfield-twp.us

Springfield Charter Township is a charter township of Oakland County in the U.S. state of Michigan. As of the 2020 census, the township population was 14,703. The township was named for the numerous springs in the area.

== Communities ==
The Township has no incorporated villages and five unincorporated communities within:

- Andersonville, first known as the "Husted Settlement" after the Hustead family who moved there in 1833, is at 42°43′48″N 83°29′33″W around the junction of Andersonville and Big Lake roads. It became known as the "Anderson Settlement" after the Anderson family purchased 120 acres (0.49 km^{2}) and settled there in 1836. A post office named "Andersonville" was established in 1895, which operated until 1912. It was a station on the Detroit and Milwaukee Railway. The same track is still in use by Canadian National for freight service.
- Austin Corners located on the northern boundary of the township with Groveland Township.
- Davisburg is located at 42°45′08″N 83°32′29″W, around the junction of Davisburg and Andersonville roads. The Davisburg ZIP code of 48350 serves most of Springfield Township. The location was named for Cornelius Davis, who moved there in 1836, and with his sons platted a village in 1857. A post office was established in 1855, and "Davisburg" still serves as the mailing address for a majority of addresses within the township. Davisburg was a named station on the Detroit and Milwaukee Railway passenger service. The same track is still in use by Canadian National for freight service.
- Jossman Acres is located at Clarridge and Cherrywood roads (42°44′58″N 83°28′25″W (Elevation: 1066 ft./325 m.).
- Springfield is located at 42°44′58″N 83°28′25″W around the junction of Bridge Lake Road and Dixie Highway. Daniel LeRoy made the first land purchase in the township, in June 1830. Ashael Fuller settled on LeRoy's land and later purchased much of it. Fuller opened a hotel on the Detroit-Saginaw stagecoach line. A post office opened in 1832 and operated until 1888. Several lots were platted in 1840.

== History ==
Springfield Township was established by the Michigan Legislature on March 2, 1836. Civil government was first organized April 3, 1837. Springfield, one of the first settlements in the area, began with a hotel along the Detroit and Saginaw Turnpike, now known as Dixie Highway. Andersonville, located at the intersection of Andersonville Road and Big Lake Road, was settled shortly thereafter in 1833, followed three years later by the hamlet of Davisburg. Springfield Township transitioned from a General Law Township to a Charter Township under Michigan's Charter Township Act on April 1, 1986.

The Detroit and Milwaukee Railway (now part of the Canadian National Railway) was built in 1856, and two stations were in the township, in Andersonville and Davisburg. The railroad provided a major impetus to growth. Agriculture was the mainstay of the local economy and trains allowed the farmers to ship produce and live stock to market and to receive supplies and equipment. By 1860 Springfield Township's population was 1,425.

In 1924, Dixie Highway was paved from Pontiac to Flint. With the decline of agriculture as a major economic activity in the township, residents began commuting to Pontiac and Flint for employment in the developing automotive factories, marking the beginning of the township's decline. By 1930, Springfield Township's population had fallen to 923. The township's decline would unexpectedly be reversed in the 1960s with the construction of Interstate 75. The accessibility provided by two interchanges accelerated residential growth in the late 1960s and 1970s. Population improved, going from 1,825 in 1950 to 2,664 in 1960, 4,388 in 1970, 6,502 in 1976, and 8,295 in 1980.

Springfield Township has had a long-standing commitment to zoning and planning dating back to the early 1950s. The Township Board adopted an interim zoning ordinance in early 1952, which contained five zoning districts. In 1965 an ordinance which contained 13 different zoning districts was adopted. Planning and zoning functions were coordinated with the adoption of the township's first Master Plan in 1972 and subsequently the adoption of an entirely new zoning ordinance the following year. The 1973 ordinance serves as a basis for the current zoning ordinance.

Out of concern for the residential growth during the 1970s and its effects on the entire township, the Planning Commission embarked on a comprehensive review of the Master Plan and the Zoning Map in the early 1980s. As a result, the revised Master Plan and Zoning Ordinance incorporated natural resource protection information and standards. This slowed the growth of Springfield Township during the decade, growing to 9,927 in 1990. Additional comprehensive reviews and updates were done in the early 1990s and again in 2002. The primary basis for the township's planning, zoning, and land use decisions for at least the last 20 years has been the protection and preservation of their abundant and very special natural resources.

Today, Springfield Township is home to many parks, including Springfield Oaks County Park, site of the annual Oakland County Fair, and Indian Springs Metropark. The township is also home to several churches, a few schools including Springfield Christian Academy (the township's only high school) and a handful of shopping areas. The township's population, which increased by a third in the 1990s, continued to grow through the first decade of the 21st century.

Springfield Township also houses a former Superfund site, The Springfield Township Dump.

Springfield Township is a member of the Clarkston Area Chamber of Commerce and Holly Chamber of Commerce.

== Geography ==
According to the United States Census Bureau, the township has a total area of 36.8 square miles (95 km^{2}), of which 35.6 square miles (92 km^{2}) is land and 1.2 square miles (3.1 km^{2}), or 3.16%, is water.

The Shiawassee River, Huron River, along with the main branch of the Clinton River, rise within the township. The Shiawassee flows in a northwesterly direction toward Saginaw where it joins with the Tittabawassee River to form the Saginaw River, which drains into the Saginaw Bay of Lake Huron. The Huron flows in a southeasterly direction and empties into Lake Erie. The Lower Huron River demarks the boundary between Wayne County and Monroe County. The Clinton flows in an easterly direction and empties into Lake St. Clair in Macomb County's Harrison Township.

== Demographics ==
As of the census of 2000, there were 13,338 people, 4,619 households, and 3,658 families residing in the township. The population density was 374.8 inhabitants per square mile (144.7/km^{2}). There were 4,794 housing units at an average density of 134.7 per square mile (52.0/km^{2}). The racial makeup of the township was 96.69% White, 1.09% African American, 0.46% Native American, 0.55% Asian, 0.01% Pacific Islander, 0.26% from other races, and 0.93% from two or more races. Hispanic or Latino of any race were 1.98% of the population.

There were 4,619 households, out of which 41.2% had children under the age of 18 living with them, 68.5% were married couples living together, 7.2% had a female householder with no husband present, and 20.8% were non-families. 15.6% of all households were made up of individuals, and 3.2% had someone living alone who was 65 years of age or older. The average household size was 2.87 and the average family size was 3.22.

In the township 28.8% of the population was under the age of 18, 7.1% was from 18 to 24, 32.9% from 25 to 44, 25.4% from 45 to 64, and 5.8% was 65 years of age or older. The median age was 36 years. For every 100 females, there were 101.4 males. For every 100 females age 18 and over, there were 99.8 males.

The median income for a household in the township was $71,977, and the median income for a family was $76,816. Males had a median income of $57,500 versus $34,615 for females. The per capita income for the township was $28,247. About 3.8% of families and 5.9% of the population were below the poverty line, including 8.8% of those under age 18 and 9.6% of those age 65 and over.
