= Walnut Lake (West Bloomfield Township, Michigan) =

Lake in the state of Michigan, United States

- Location within Michigan Location within the United States
- Location: Oakland County, Michigan, U.S.
- Coordinates: 42°33′42″N 83°19′51″W
- Type: Lake
- Basin countries: United States
- Surface area: 232 acres (94 ha)
- Max. depth: 101 ft (31 m)
- Surface elevation: 879 ft (268 m)
- Settlements: West Bloomfield Township

Walnut Lake is a private, all-sports, 233-acre (94 ha) lake in West Bloomfield Township, Oakland County, in the U.S. state of Michigan.

The Walnut Lake shoreline is lined with high-end exclusive homes.

The 101-foot-deep (31 m) lake is the fifth-deepest lake in Oakland County.
