= Lake Angelus (Michigan) =

Lake in Oakland County, Michigan, United States

- Location within Michigan
- Location: Oakland County, Michigan, U.S.
- Coordinates: 42.692109°N 83.329036°W
- Basin countries: United States
- Surface area: 477 acres (193 ha)
- Max. depth: 88 ft (27 m)
- Islands: One
- Settlements: Auburn Hills

Lake Angelus is a private, all-sports, 477 acres (193 ha) lake in Oakland County, in the U.S. state of Michigan. The community of Lake Angelus is at the lake.

Lake Angelus is primarily located in Auburn Hills, except for a portion of the western portion of the lake which lies in Waterford Township.

Lake Angelus is the ninth-largest lake in Oakland County and the eighth-deepest lake in Oakland County.

== Name ==
In the early 1900s, the lake was called Three Mile Lake. During the 1920s, the lake was renamed Lake Angelus by Mrs. Sollace B. Collidge.
