= Union Lake (Michigan) =

Lake in the state of Michigan, United States

- Location within Michigan
- Location: Oakland County, Michigan
- Coordinates: 42°36′27″N 83°25′51″W
- Type: Reservoir
- Basin countries: United States
- Surface area: 465 acres (188 ha)
- Max. depth: 110 ft (34 m)
- Surface elevation: 925 ft (282 m)
- Settlements: Commerce Township

Union Lake is an all-sports, 465-acre (188 ha) lake in Oakland County, Michigan, United States. The lake lies within Commerce Township. It is the tenth-largest lake and third-deepest lake in Oakland County.

Union Lake is considered one of the leading walleye fishing lakes in the state.

The lake has one public boat-launch.
