= Clinton River (Michigan) =

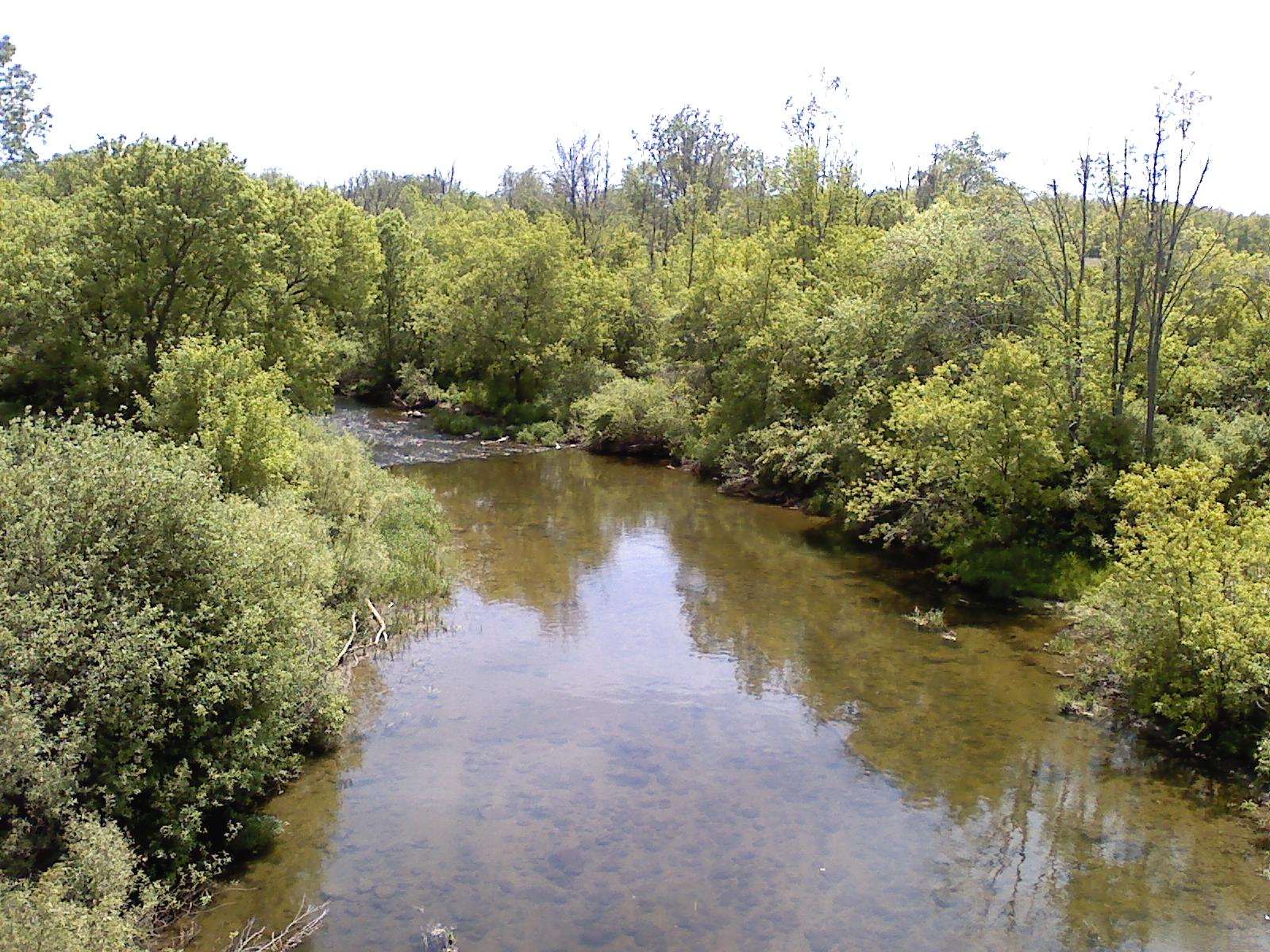
- The Clinton River in Macomb County

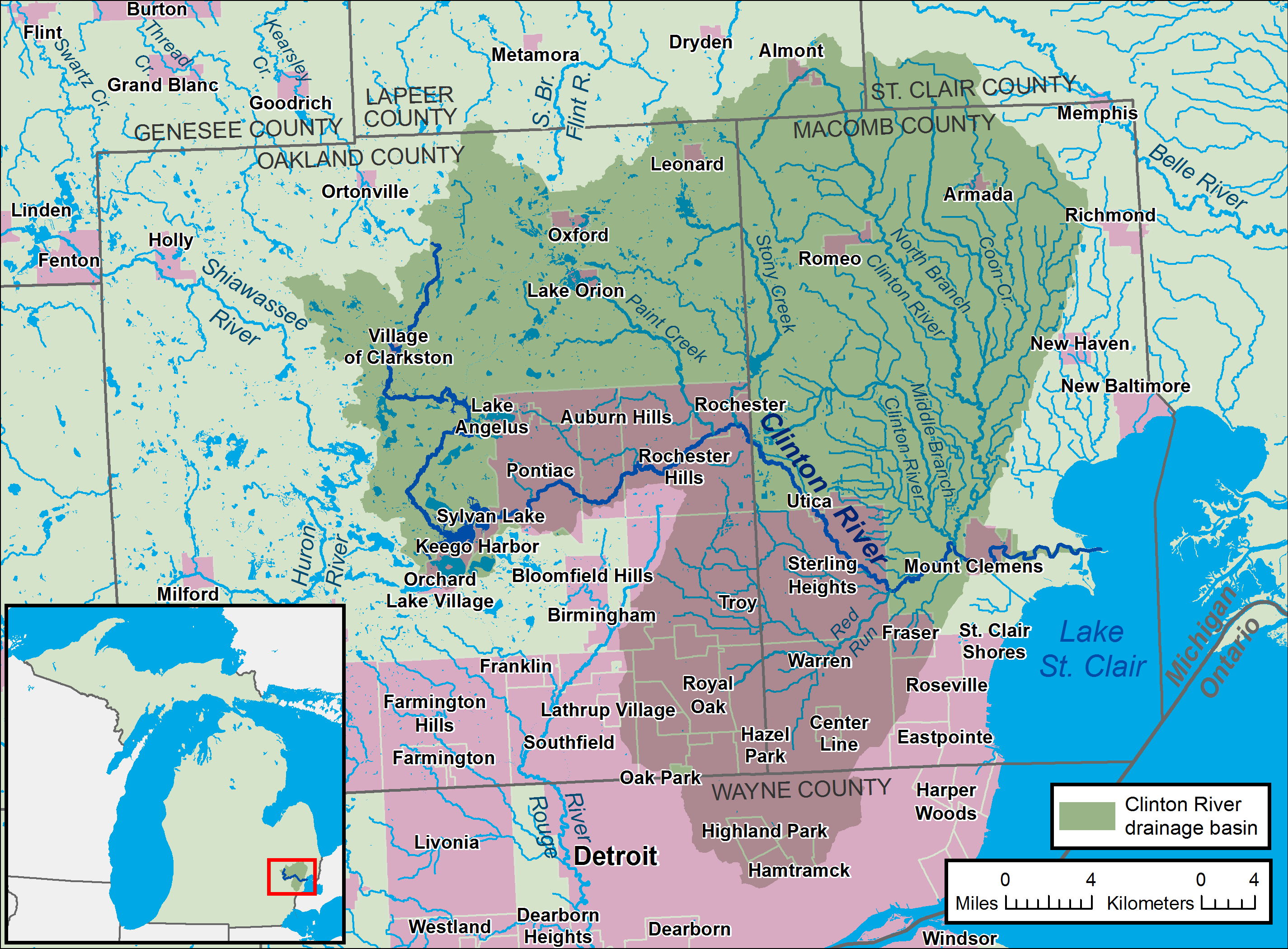
- A map of the Clinton River and its watershed

Location
- Country: United States
- State: Michigan
- Counties: Oakland, Macomb

Physical characteristics
- Mouth
  - location: Lake St. Clair
  - coordinates: 42°35′24.76″N 82°49′17.17″W
- Length: 83 miles (134 km)
- Basin size: 760 square miles (2,000 km^{2})
- Discharge
  - location: mouth
  - average: 698.66 cu ft/s (19.784 m^{3}/s) (estimate)

Basin features
- Progression: Lake St. Clair → Detroit River → Lake Erie → Niagara River → Lake Ontario → St. Lawrence River → Gulf of St. Lawrence / Atlantic Ocean
- Tributaries
  - left: Galloway Creek, Paint Creek, Stony Creek, North Branch Clinton River,
  - right: Red Run
- Waterbodies: Lake Orion

The Clinton River is a river in southeastern Michigan in the United States. It is named in honor of DeWitt Clinton, who was governor of New York from 1817 to 1823.

The main branch of the river rises from wetlands and coldwater tributaries from within Independence, Brandon and Springfield townships in Oakland County. A series of dams create a number of small lakes west of Pontiac, the last of which is Crystal Lake. The river is piped under downtown Pontiac, re-emerging to the east of downtown. The north branch and the middle branch rise in northern Macomb County and join the main branch in Clinton Township (which was named after the river in 1824). The main branch flows 83.0 miles (133.6 km) from its headwaters to Lake St. Clair in Harrison Township.

The Clinton River watershed drains 760 square miles (2,000 km^{2}), including most of Macomb County, a large portion of Oakland County, as well as small portions of Lapeer and St. Clair counties. More than 1.4 million people in over 60 municipalities live in the watershed. For the most part, only the waters located downstream of the city of Mount Clemens are navigable by water vessels.

Under the Great Lakes Water Quality Agreement in 1987, along with 42 other areas, the lower segment of the river was designated as an Area of Concern, based on the heavy presence of pollutant contamination. In 1995, the designation was expanded to include the entire watershed of the river and the lower nearshore of Lake St. Clair.

The Clinton-Kalamazoo Canal was a failed attempt to build a waterway connecting Lake St. Clair with Lake Michigan. It was originally planned to stretch 216 miles, but was abandoned after only 13 miles had been completed.

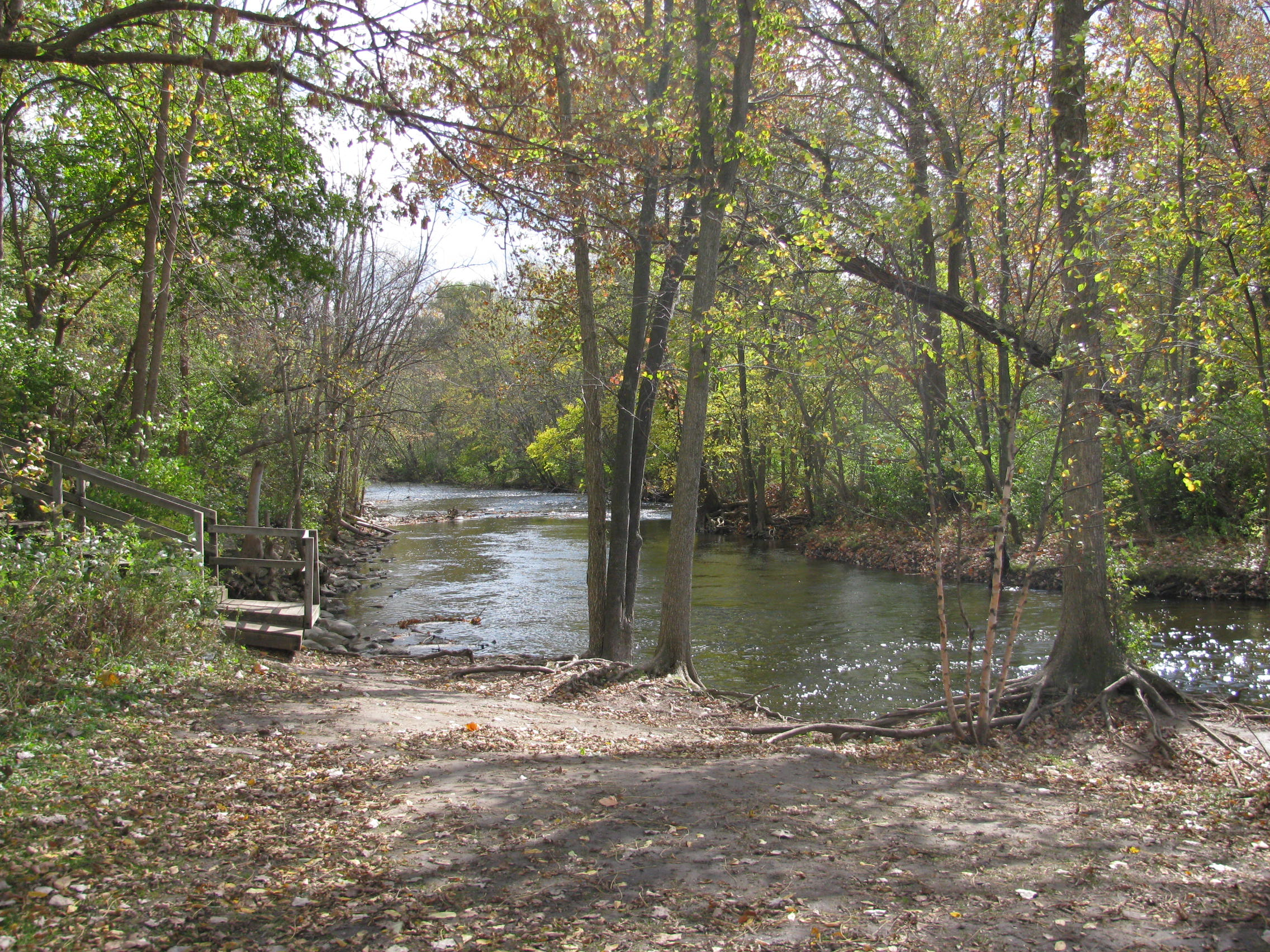
Clinton River at Rochester Hills

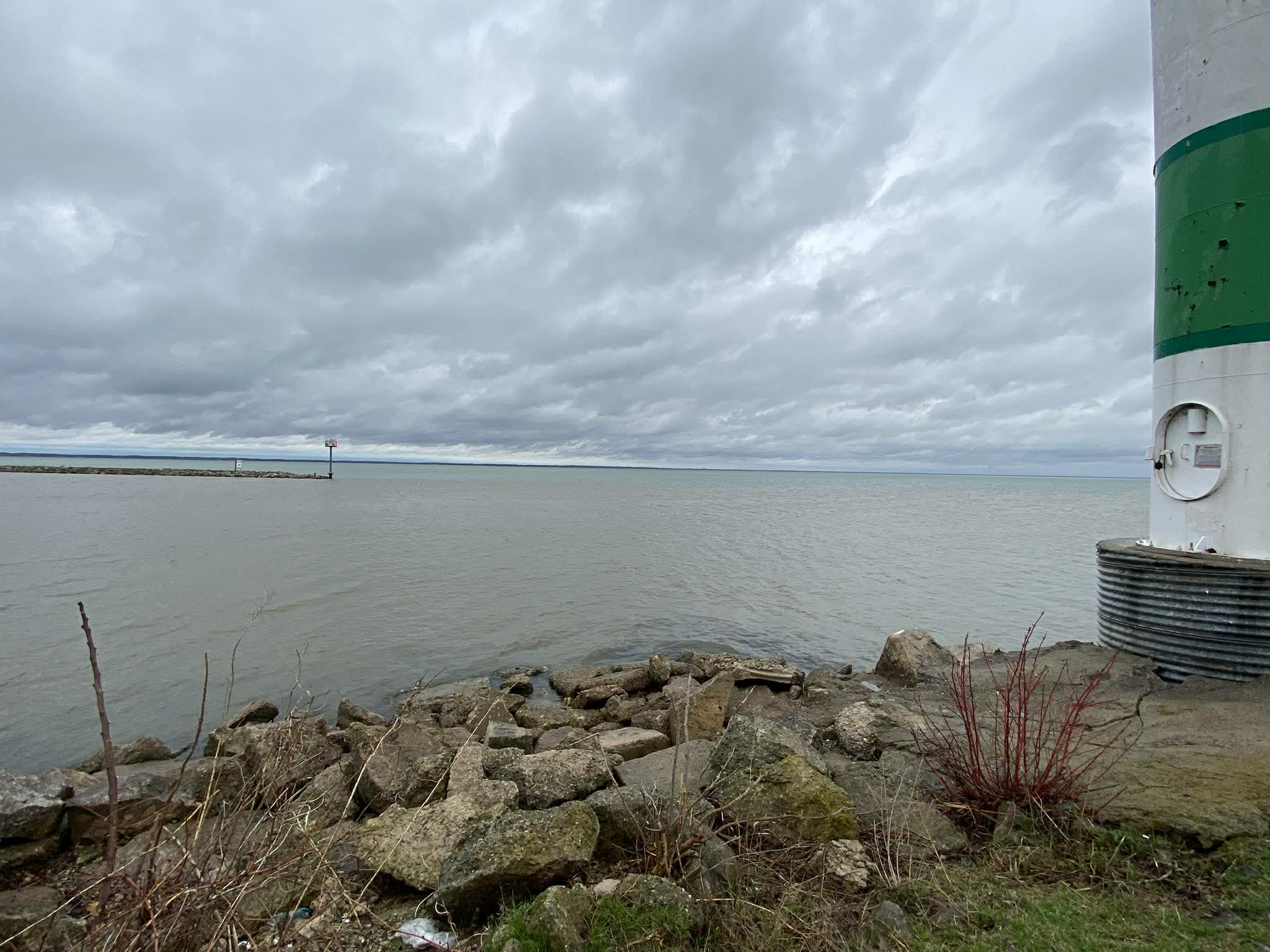
Mouth of Clinton river (Michigan) flowing into Lake St. Clair

The French explorers of the late 17th century knew the river as the Nottawasippee, an Ojibwe term that means "like rattlesnakes." This was also the name given to the Huron people by the region's Anishinaabe (Ojibwe, Odawa, and Potawatomi) inhabitants.

British fur traders referred to it as the Huron River of St. Clair. It was referred to as "the River Huron" in the 1784 home eulogy of the area's first American settler, William Tucker, who built his home along the river about 3 miles (5 km) upstream from its mouth.

It received its current name on July 17, 1824. The Michigan Territorial Council made the change in order to end the confusion between this river and the Huron River of Lake Erie, which also rises in Oakland County's Springfield Township.

The Huron-Clinton Metroparks system preserves land in the watershed as public parks; Wolcott Mill Metropark is on the north branch of the river.
