= Clintonville, Michigan =

- Unincorporated community
- Location within the state of Michigan
- Coordinates: 42°41′16″N 83°20′59″W
- Country: United States
- State: Michigan
- County: Oakland
- Township: Waterford
- Settled: 1830
- Platted: 1847
- Time zone: UTC-5 (EST)
  - Summer (DST): UTC-4 (EDT)
- ZIP code(s): 48329 (Waterford)
- Area code: 248
- FIPS code: 26-84240
- GNIS feature ID: 1627218

Clintonville is an unincorporated community in Oakland County in the U.S. state of Michigan. The community is located within Waterford Township. As an unincorporated community, Clintonville has no legally defined area or population statistics of its own, and it uses the Waterford 48328 ZIP Code.

It was located along the Clinton River on what today is Walton Boulevard between Clintonville Road and Sashabaw Road. The village was built on the shores of Wormer Lake (27.5 acres) and Schoolhouse Lake (37 acres).

== History ==
Clintonville was first settled in 1830 by Samuel C. Munson. That same year, Munson built a gristmill and saw mill at Clintonville on Pond Lake (now Lake Oakland), just north of where the Clinton River meets Walton Boulevard today.

Clintonville was platted in 1847.

== Early residents ==
Clintonville land tract owners in 1872 include:

- John Linderman (1794-1877)
- Marcus Riker (1800-1884)
- W. Walker
- John Van Campen (1824-1910)
- J. Bogardus
- Mrs. Stuart
- B. Greening
- J. Greening

== Post Office ==
Clintonville had a post office from 1898 until 1902.

== School ==
Clintonville School No.7 was the first school in Clintonville. It was built on the banks of Schoolhouse Lake on what today is 3101 Walton Blvd. in Waterford, Michigan near Clintonville Road. The school building still stands today. Beginning in 1951, Clintonville was served by Jayno Adams Elementary School, part of the Waterford School District; however the school was closed in 2010 and has since been demolished. Today, Clintonville is served by David Grayson Elementary, which opened in 1955, and Cooley Elementary, which opened in 1961.

== Streets ==
In 1872, east-west streets in Clintonville were Lafayette Street, Main Street, Columbia Street, Darkman Street, Margaret Street and Elizabeth Street. North-south streets were Van Buren Street, Jackson Street, Washington Street, Franklin Street, Mill Street, and Pontiac Street.
