= Otter Lake =

Otter Lake may refer to:

== U.S. ==
- Otter Lake (Illinois), a lake
- Otter Lake, Indiana, a census-designated place
- Otter Lake (Michigan), any of several lakes
  - Otter Lake (Waterford Township, Michigan)
- Otter Lake, Michigan, a village
- Otter Lake (Cayuga County, New York), a lake
- Otter Lake (Arietta, Hamilton County, New York), a lake
- Otter Lake, New York, a hamlet in Oneida County
- Otter Lake (Oneida County, New York), a lake
- Otter Lake (Elcho, Wisconsin)
- Otter Lake (Washington), within the Alpine Lakes Wilderness

== Canada ==
- Otter Lake (British Columbia), a lake in the Tulameen Valley in the Similkameen Country
- Otter Lake Provincial Park in British Columbia
- Otter Lake, Nova Scotia, a small unincorporated town
- Otter Lake (Nova Scotia), any of several lakes
- Otter Lake (Otter River), the source of the Otter River, in Kenora District, Ontario
- Otter Lake (Rideau Lakes, Leeds and Grenville United Counties, Ontario)
- Otter Lake (Seguin, Parry Sound District, Ontario)
- Otter Lake, Quebec, a municipality
- Otter Lake (Saskatchewan), a lake
- Otter Lake Airport in Saskatchewan
- Otter Lake Water Aerodrome in Saskatchewan
