= Scott Lake =

Scott Lake, Scotts Lake, Lake Scott, or Scotty Lake may refer to:

== People ==
- Scott A. Lake, Champion U.S. racehorse trainer

== Inhabited places ==
- Scott Lake, Florida, a census-designated place in Miami-Dade County, Florida

== Lakes ==
=== Australia ===
- Lake Scott, in Tasmania

=== Canada ===
- Scott Lake (Northwest Territories–Saskatchewan), bordering Saskatchewan and the Northwest Territories

==== British Columbia ====
- Scott Lake, in Peace River Regional District

==== New Brunswick ====
- Scott Lake, in Kings County, New Brunswick

==== Nova Scotia ====
- Scotts Lake, in Digby County, Nova Scotia
- Scott Lake, in Halifax County, Nova Scotia
- Scott Lake, in Queens County, Nova Scotia
- Scotts Lake, in Yarmouth County, Nova Scotia

=== Russian Federation ===
- озеро Скотта (transliteration: ozero Skotta, translation: Lake of Scott), in Krasnodar Krai, Southern Federal District

=== United States ===
==== Alaska ====
- Scotty Lake, in Denali
- Scott Lake, in Matanuska-Susitna Borough, Alaska
- Scotty Lake, in Matanuska-Susitna Borough, Alaska

==== Arkansas ====
- Scott Lake, in Bradley County, Arkansas
- Scotty Lake, in Howard County, Arkansas
- Scott Lake, in Little River County, Arkansas
- Scott Lake, in Miller County, Arkansas

==== California ====
- Scotts Lake, in El Dorado County, California
- Scott Lake, in Siskiyou County, California

==== Colorado ====
- Scott Lake, in Pitkin County, Colorado

==== Florida ====
- Lake Scott, in Orange County, Florida
- Scott Lake, in Polk County, Florida

==== Georgia ====
- Scott Lake, in Baldwin County, Georgia
- Scott Lake, in Gordon County, Georgia
- Scotts Lake, in Henry County, Georgia
- Scott Lake, in Thomas County, Georgia
- Scott Lake, in Walker County, Georgia

==== Illinois ====
- Scott Lake, in Saint Clair County, Illinois

==== Kansas ====
- Lake Scott, in Lake Scott State Park

==== Michigan ====
- Scott Lake, in Dickinson County, Michigan
- Scott Lake, in Iron County, Michigan
- Scott Lake, in Kent County, Michigan
- Scott Lake (Waterford Township, Michigan), in Oakland County

==== Minnesota ====
- Scotts Lake, in Antrim County, Michigan
- Scott Lake, in Carver County, Minnesota
- Scott Lake, in Crow Wing County, Minnesota
- Scott Lake (Grant County, Minnesota)
- Scott Lake, a lake in Hannepin County
- Scott Lake, in Lake County, Minnesota
- Scott Lake, in Saint Lewis County
- Scott Lake, in Wright County, Minnesota

==== Mississippi ====
- Scott Lake, in Pontotoc County, Mississippi
- Scott Lake, in Warren County, Mississippi

==== Missouri ====
- Scott Lake, in Boone County, Missouri
- Scott Lake, in Cole County, Missouri

==== Montana ====
- Scott Lake, in Beaverhead County, Montana
- Scott Lake, in Flathead County, Montana

==== New York ====
- Scott Lake, in Washington County, New York

==== North Carolina ====
- Lake Scott, see W. Kerr Scott Dam and Reservoir
- Scott Lake, in Stokes County, North Carolina
- Scotts Lake, in Wilson County, North Carolina

==== North Dakota ====
- Scotts Lake, in Barnes County, North Dakota

==== Oregon ====
- Scott Lake, in Lake County, Oregon

==== South Carolina ====
- Scotts Lake, in Aiken County, South Carolina
- Scott Lake, in Florence County, South Carolina

==== South Dakota ====
- Scott Lake (South Dakota), in Aurora County

==== Tennessee ====
- Scott Lake, in Chester County, Tennessee

==== Texas ====
- Scott Lake, in Bexar County, Texas
- Lake Scott, in Childress County, Texas
- Scott Lake, in Lavaca County, Texas
- Scott Lake, in Montgomery County, Texas
- Scott Lake, in Young County, Texas

==== Washington ====
- Scott Lake (Washington), Thurston County

==== West Virginia ====
- Scott Lake, in Randolph County, West Virginia

==== Wisconsin ====
- Scott Lake, in Barron County, Wisconsin
- Scott Lake, in Douglas County, Wisconsin
- Scott Lake, in Forest County, Wisconsin
- Scott Lake, in Sawyer County, Wisconsin

==== Wyoming ====
- Scott Lake, a lake in Sublette County
