= List of lakes of Missoula County, Montana =

There are at least 132 named lakes and reservoirs in Missoula County, Montana.

== Lakes ==
- Beanhole Lake, 47°21′00″N 113°48′46″W, el. 7,270 feet (2,220 m)
- Beaver Lake, 47°20′49″N 113°40′08″W, el. 5,728 feet (1,746 m)
- Big Lake, 47°02′23″N 113°55′08″W, el. 6,880 feet (2,100 m)
- Big Sky Lake, 47°06′51″N 113°23′27″W, el. 4,275 feet (1,303 m)
- Blanchard Lake, 47°01′09″N 113°22′55″W, el. 3,822 feet (1,165 m)
- Boulder Lake, 47°04′27″N 113°50′08″W, el. 6,493 feet (1,979 m)
- Buck Lake, 47°17′03″N 113°46′43″W, el. 6,509 feet (1,984 m)
- Bull Lake, 47°01′57″N 113°49′47″W, el. 6,092 feet (1,857 m)
- Bunyan Lake, 47°21′27″N 113°45′34″W, el. 5,633 feet (1,717 m)
- Carlton Lake, 46°41′01″N 114°13′15″W, el. 7,805 feet (2,379 m)
- Cheff Lake, 47°23′17″N 113°51′02″W, el. 6,673 feet (2,034 m)
- Clearwater Lake, 47°23′08″N 113°33′33″W, el. 4,793 feet (1,461 m)
- Colt Lake, 47°21′46″N 113°39′43″W, el. 4,839 feet (1,475 m)
- Conko Lake, 47°26′11″N 113°50′35″W, el. 6,391 feet (1,948 m)
- Cott Lake, 47°06′15″N 113°20′27″W, el. 4,226 feet (1,288 m)
- Cottonwood Lakes, 47°10′01″N 113°21′07″W, el. 4,839 feet (1,475 m)
- Crazy Fish Lake, 47°06′00″N 113°53′28″W, el. 6,608 feet (2,014 m)
- Crescent Lake, 47°22′55″N 113°50′25″W, el. 6,060 feet (1,850 m)
- Crystal Lake, 47°19′51″N 113°47′50″W, el. 4,760 feet (1,450 m)
- Cygnet Lake, 47°24′26″N 113°42′53″W, el. 4,318 feet (1,316 m)
- Doctor Lake, 47°24′13″N 113°28′51″W, el. 5,650 feet (1,720 m)
- Eagle Lake, 47°21′18″N 113°48′19″W, el. 6,840 feet (2,080 m)
- Elbow Lake, 47°02′48″N 113°23′55″W, el. 3,842 feet (1,171 m)
- Elk Lake, 47°27′33″N 113°55′01″W, el. 6,529 feet (1,990 m)
- Farmers Lakes, 47°00′09″N 113°54′09″W, el. 6,729 feet (2,051 m)
- Finley Lakes, 47°04′17″N 113°57′34″W, el. 6,263 feet (1,909 m)
- Florence Lake, 47°16′11″N 113°28′49″W, el. 5,827 feet (1,776 m)
- Fly Lake, 47°05′17″N 113°49′19″W, el. 6,375 feet (1,943 m)
- George Lake, 47°22′23″N 113°29′07″W, el. 7,119 feet (2,170 m)
- Glacier Lake, 47°22′17″N 113°49′25″W, el. 5,266 feet (1,605 m)
- Glacier Lake, 47°02′41″N 113°56′06″W, el. 6,968 feet (2,124 m)
- Gray Wolf Lake, 47°17′05″N 113°49′44″W, el. 6,650 feet (2,030 m)
- Grizzly Lake, 47°18′40″N 113°53′29″W, el. 7,963 feet (2,427 m)
- Harpers Lake, 47°01′23″N 113°22′51″W, el. 3,822 feet (1,165 m)
- Harpers Lake, 47°01′17″N 113°23′15″W, el. 3,855 feet (1,175 m)
- Heart Lake, 47°22′49″N 113°50′47″W, el. 6,168 feet (1,880 m)
- Hemlock Lake, 47°26′13″N 113°50′06″W, el. 6,024 feet (1,836 m)
- Hidden Lake, 47°08′36″N 113°34′05″W, el. 4,278 feet (1,304 m)
- Hidden Lake, 47°05′15″N 113°44′56″W, el. 6,033 feet (1,839 m)
- High Park Lake, 47°18′48″N 113°50′46″W, el. 6,381 feet (1,945 m)
- Holland Lake, 47°26′58″N 113°35′54″W, el. 4,035 feet (1,230 m)
- Island Lake, 47°22′32″N 113°51′15″W, el. 6,575 feet (2,004 m)
- Jewell Lake, 47°21′44″N 113°51′07″W, el. 6,788 feet (2,069 m)
- Jim Lake, 47°35′06″N 113°52′32″W, el. 5,518 feet (1,682 m)
- Koessler Lake, 47°24′35″N 113°29′50″W, el. 6,014 feet (1,833 m)
- Kreis Pond, 47°06′04″N 114°25′30″W, el. 3,681 feet (1,122 m)
- Lace Lake, 47°21′28″N 113°50′33″W, el. 6,339 feet (1,932 m)
- Lagoon Lake, 47°21′38″N 113°50′51″W, el. 6,591 feet (2,009 m)
- Lake Alva, 47°18′51″N 113°34′56″W, el. 4,081 feet (1,244 m)
- Lake Dinah, 47°15′22″N 113°42′53″W, el. 6,473 feet (1,973 m)
- Lake Elsina, 47°14′41″N 113°42′18″W, el. 6,312 feet (1,924 m)
- Lake Inez, 47°16′59″N 113°34′00″W, el. 4,062 feet (1,238 m)
- Lake Marshall, 47°17′20″N 113°38′59″W, el. 4,754 feet (1,449 m)
- Lake Sa-ol-Sooth, 47°06′30″N 113°54′18″W, el. 7,388 feet (2,252 m)
- Lena Lake, 47°27′58″N 113°28′01″W, el. 6,735 feet (2,053 m)
- Lick Lake, 47°25′14″N 113°30′52″W, el. 5,987 feet (1,825 m)
- Lindbergh Lake, 47°22′58″N 113°44′20″W, el. 4,327 feet (1,319 m)
- Little Carlton Lake, 46°40′46″N 114°12′50″W, el. 7,749 feet (2,362 m)
- Little Lake, 47°02′52″N 113°55′29″W, el. 6,424 feet (1,958 m)
- Lockwood Lake, 46°54′27″N 113°44′53″W, el. 3,399 feet (1,036 m)
- Loco Lake, 47°23′47″N 113°51′44″W, el. 6,552 feet (1,997 m)
- Loon Lake, 47°27′20″N 113°43′37″W, el. 4,068 feet (1,240 m)
- Lost Lake, 47°10′18″N 114°32′04″W, el. 3,917 feet (1,194 m)
- Lost Lake, 47°20′07″N 113°51′06″W, el. 6,230 feet (1,900 m)
- Lost Sheep Lake, 47°16′11″N 113°47′45″W, el. 6,427 feet (1,959 m)
- Lower Cold Lake, 47°33′33″N 113°53′17″W, el. 5,748 feet (1,752 m)
- Lower Jocko Lake, 47°11′56″N 113°45′00″W, el. 4,767 feet (1,453 m)
- Marys Pond, 46°42′14″N 114°21′02″W, el. 5,745 feet (1,751 m)
- McClain Lake, 46°40′34″N 114°12′31″W, el. 7,756 feet (2,364 m)
- Meadow Lake, 47°21′05″N 113°45′48″W, el. 5,709 feet (1,740 m)
- Meadow Lake, 47°09′21″N 113°51′55″W, el. 6,270 feet (1,910 m)
- Mollman Lakes, 47°28′34″N 113°56′08″W, el. 6,870 feet (2,090 m)
- Mountaineer Lake, 47°20′17″N 113°52′16″W, el. 7,674 feet (2,339 m)
- Necklace Lakes, 47°29′24″N 113°32′23″W, el. 6,555 feet (1,998 m)
- North Hemlock Lake, 47°27′15″N 113°50′10″W, el. 6,827 feet (2,081 m)
- North One Horse Lake, 46°40′26″N 114°13′46″W, el. 7,861 feet (2,396 m)
- Notlimah Lake, 47°24′35″N 113°46′47″W, el. 5,115 feet (1,559 m)
- Onemile Pond, 47°11′22″N 113°40′32″W, el. 4,954 feet (1,510 m)
- Pasture Lake, 47°17′40″N 113°47′02″W, el. 5,505 feet (1,678 m)
- Pendent Lake, 47°28′27″N 113°31′38″W, el. 6,499 feet (1,981 m)
- Pierce Lake, 47°23′37″N 113°37′31″W, el. 4,344 feet (1,324 m)
- Placid Lake, 47°07′09″N 113°31′27″W, el. 4,124 feet (1,257 m)
- Rainy Lake, 47°20′24″N 113°35′41″W, el. 4,111 feet (1,253 m)
- Reed Lake, 46°40′15″N 114°14′07″W, el. 7,900 feet (2,400 m)
- Roosevelt Lake, 47°01′12″N 113°54′57″W, el. 6,627 feet (2,020 m)
- Rubble Lake, 47°29′55″N 113°34′30″W, el. 7,634 feet (2,327 m)
- Rumble Creek Lake, 47°31′51″N 113°35′14″W, el. 7,894 feet (2,406 m)
- Salmon Lake, 47°05′42″N 113°24′11″W, el. 3,907 feet (1,191 m)
- Sapphire Lake, 47°27′57″N 113°32′39″W, el. 6,998 feet (2,133 m)
- Sappho Lake, 47°35′26″N 113°33′02″W, el. 7,434 feet (2,266 m)
- Seeley Lake, 47°11′40″N 113°30′45″W, el. 3,996 feet (1,218 m)
- Seepela Lake, 47°20′26″N 113°50′17″W, el. 7,484 feet (2,281 m)
- Skylark Lake, 47°21′18″N 113°47′31″W, el. 6,453 feet (1,967 m)
- Sleeping Elk Lake, 47°20′44″N 113°49′22″W, el. 6,709 feet (2,045 m)
- South One Horse Lake, 46°39′49″N 114°14′24″W, el. 7,434 feet (2,266 m)
- Spider Lake, 47°26′19″N 113°52′38″W, el. 6,781 feet (2,067 m)
- Spook Lake, 47°04′24″N 113°34′17″W, el. 5,640 feet (1,720 m)
- Spook Lake, 47°27′55″N 113°54′41″W, el. 6,594 feet (2,010 m)
- Stoner Lake, 47°28′11″N 113°43′51″W, el. 4,032 feet (1,229 m)
- Sudden Lake, 47°05′39″N 113°50′11″W, el. 6,745 feet (2,056 m)
- Summit Lake, 47°22′32″N 113°37′34″W, el. 4,180 feet (1,270 m)
- Summit Lake, 47°16′29″N 113°47′19″W, el. 6,798 feet (2,072 m)
- Sunset Lake, 47°16′04″N 113°45′44″W, el. 6,273 feet (1,912 m)
- Terrace Lakes, 47°30′22″N 113°33′28″W, el. 6,860 feet (2,090 m)
- The Angels Bathing Pool, 47°18′09″N 113°48′55″W, el. 6,762 feet (2,061 m)
- Tote Road Lake, 47°06′06″N 113°22′29″W, el. 4,222 feet (1,287 m)
- Tunnel Lake, 46°52′08″N 113°53′33″W, el. 3,264 feet (995 m)
- Tuppers Lake, 47°09′23″N 113°31′24″W, el. 4,354 feet (1,327 m)
- Turquoise Lake, 47°21′24″N 113°51′32″W, el. 6,427 feet (1,959 m)
- Twin Lakes, 47°00′38″N 113°54′56″W, el. 7,050 feet (2,150 m)
- Upper Cold Lake, 47°33′25″N 113°54′06″W, el. 5,876 feet (1,791 m)
- Upper Holland Lake, 47°27′43″N 113°31′34″W, el. 6,152 feet (1,875 m)
- Upper Jocko Lake, 47°11′24″N 113°42′22″W, el. 4,833 feet (1,473 m)
- Wapiti Lake, 47°05′16″N 113°51′56″W, el. 7,188 feet (2,191 m)
- Whelp Lake, 47°16′48″N 113°48′38″W, el. 6,614 feet (2,016 m)
- White Horse Lake, 47°09′45″N 113°51′46″W, el. 6,339 feet (1,932 m)
- Woodward Lake, 47°29′36″N 113°33′11″W, el. 6,437 feet (1,962 m)
- Worden Lake, 47°01′42″N 113°55′37″W, el. 6,696 feet (2,041 m)
- Yellow Lake, 47°08′37″N 113°43′18″W, el. 5,679 feet (1,731 m)

== Reservoirs ==
- Black Lake, 47°11′54″N 113°43′21″W, el. 5,013 feet (1,528 m)
- Carter Lake, 47°01′31″N 113°54′50″W, el. 6,293 feet (1,918 m)
- Glacier Lake, 47°02′42″N 113°56′09″W, el. 6,968 feet (2,124 m)
- Jocko Lake, 47°12′12″N 113°45′39″W, el. 4,767 feet (1,453 m)
- Lower Lake of Twin Lakes, 47°00′30″N 113°54′39″W, el. 6,916 feet (2,108 m)
- McKinley Lake, 47°01′04″N 113°55′19″W, el. 6,850 feet (2,090 m)
- Milltown Reservoir, 46°52′18″N 113°53′33″W, el. 3,245 feet (989 m)
- Sanders Lake, 47°03′35″N 113°56′15″W, el. 6,890 feet (2,100 m)
- Sanders Lake, 47°03′30″N 113°56′03″W, el. 6,926 feet (2,111 m)
- Sheridan Lake, 47°02′29″N 113°54′41″W, el. 6,535 feet (1,992 m)
- Spring Creek Reservoir, 47°06′06″N 114°25′27″W, el. 3,681 feet (1,122 m)
- Upper Lake, 47°00′36″N 113°55′09″W, el. 7,208 feet (2,197 m)

== See also ==
- List of lakes in Montana
