= Waterford Durant High School =

High school in Waterford, Michigan, United States

Location
- 501 North Cass Lake Road; Waterford, Michigan 48328; United States
- 42.645764°N 83.356880°W

Information
- Established: 2009
- School district: Waterford School District
- Superintendent: Scott Lindberg
- Principal: Craig Blomquist
- Teaching staff: 13.36 (FTE)
- Grades: 10-12
- Enrollment: 156 (2019-20)
- Student to teacher ratio: 11.68
- Colors: Black and Red
- Nickname: Vikings
- Website: https://www.waterford.k12.mi.us/schools/hs/durant/

Student assessments
- 2021–22 school year Change vs. prior year

M-STEP 11th grade proficiency rates (Science / Social Studies)
- Advanced %: ≤10 / ≤10
- Proficient %: ≤10 / –
- PR. Proficient %: – / 66.0
- Not Proficient %: – / 22.0

Average test scores
- SAT Total: 738.0 (▼ −36.5)

Waterford Durant High School is an alternative high school in Waterford, Michigan. It is operated by the Waterford School District and is one of three high school within the district.

The school was opened in 2009 Under the title “Waterford Alternative High School” and in 2012 was renamed and relocated to “Waterford Durant High School” and moved from a no longer standing building behind Waterford Kettering to WSD Administration/Crary Middle School (Closed 2017) Building located at 501 North Cass Lake Road.

For the 2019-2020 School year enrollment at waterford peaked at 280 9th-12th graders. Durant is open & accepting to students from across Oakland County.

== About the school ==
Waterford Durant High School students are between the ages of 15 and 19 and have completed at least one year of high school at either Waterford Mott High School or Waterford Kettering High School. Durant High School students who fulfill Waterford School District graduation requirements earn a Waterford Durant High School diploma.

The school provides a structured, supportive, and positive learning environment focused on earning credits to meet graduation requirements. Durant High School teachers identify individual student strengths and weaknesses and frequently modify their teaching methods to meet individual student needs. The goal of the school is to create a positive attitude towards learning, and to help foster the development of the interpersonal skills the student needs to become successful citizens.

== Extracurricular activities ==
Waterford Durant High School students can play sports and participate in other activities of either Waterford Kettering High School or Waterford Mott High School.

== Namesake ==
Waterford Durant High School was named for automobile industry pioneer William C. Durant.

Waterford's two other high schools were also named for automobile industry pioneers; Charles F. Kettering and Charles S. Mott.
