= Lake Mohawk =

Lake Mohawk or Mohawk Lake may refer to:

- Mohawk Lake (Waterford Township, Michigan), a lake
- Lake Mohawk (Mississippi), a reservoir
- Lake Mohawk (Ohio), a reservoir
- Lake Mohawk, New Jersey, a census-designated place
  - Lake Mohawk (New Jersey), a private lake formed by a dam in the community
