= Shannon Osika =

American middle-distance runner (born 1993)

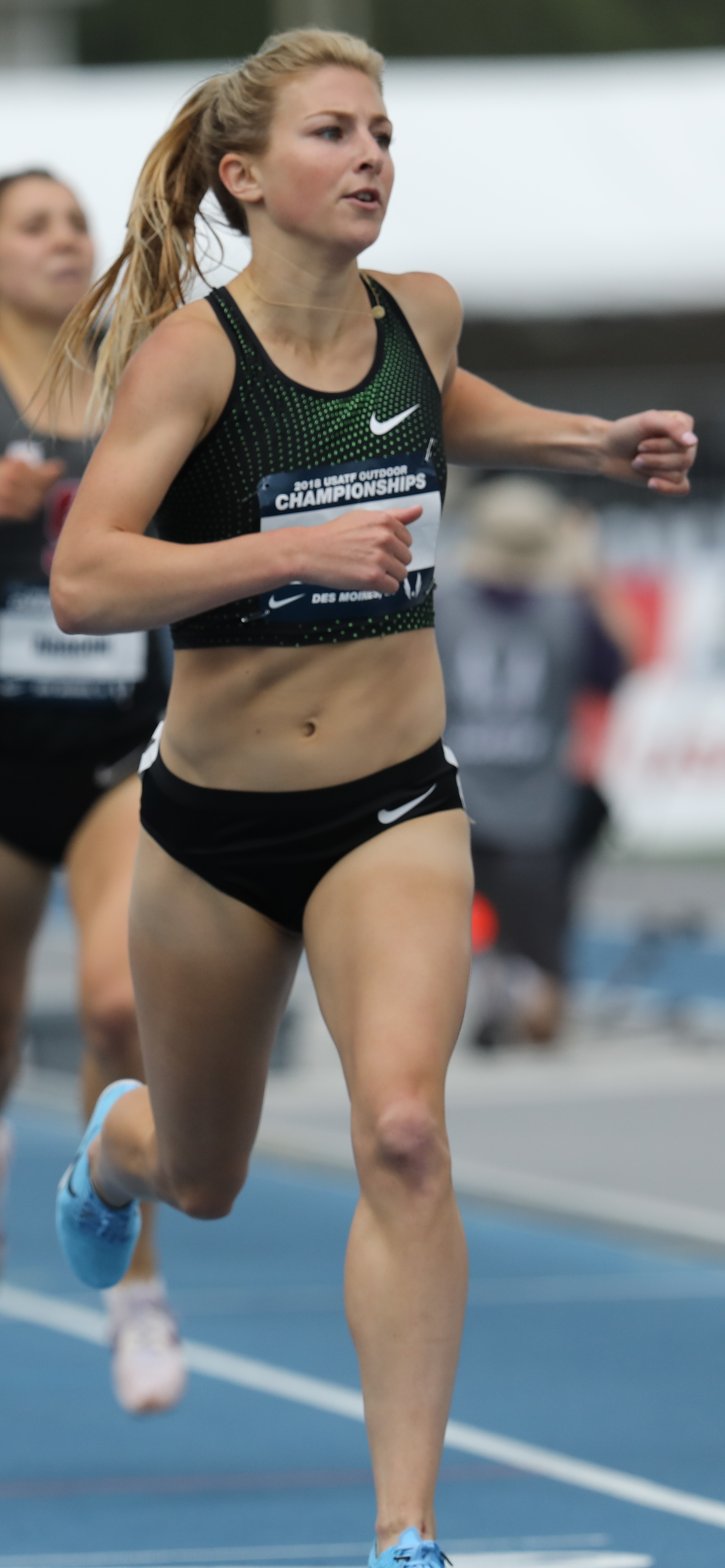
- Osika at the 2018 USA Outdoor Track and Field Championships

Personal information
- Nationality: United States
- Born: Shannon Osika; 15 June 1993 (33 years, 48 days old)
- Home town: Waterford, Michigan
- Education: Mott High School; University of Michigan

Sport
- Sport: Athletics
- Events: 1500 metres Mile run
- College team: Michigan Wolverines

Achievements and titles
- National finals: 2009 USA U18s; • 1500m, 3rd (bronze); 2012 USA U20s; • 6km XC, 1st (gold); 2012 NCAA Indoors; • Distance medley, 12th; • Mile run, 9th; 2013 NCAA XC; • 5.9 km XC, 56th; 2015 NCAA Indoors; • Distance medley, 3rd (bronze); 2015 NCAA XC; • 6km XC, 53rd; 2016 NCAA Indoors; • Distance medley, 4th; 2016 NCAAs; • 1500m, 4th; 2017 USA Road Mile; • Road mile, 4th; 2017 USA Champs; • 1500m, 7th; 2018 USA Indoors; • 1500m, 3rd (bronze); 2018 USA Road Mile; • Road mile, 4th; 2018 USA Champs; • 1500m, 7th; 2019 USA Indoors; • Mile run, 4th; 2019 USA Champs; • 1500m, 6th; 2020 USA Indoors; • 1500m, 4th; 2021 USA Champs; • 1500m, 4th; 2023 USA Road Mile; • Road mile, 5th
- Personal bests: 1500m: 4:00.73 (2021); Mile: 4:24.19 (2022)
Medal record
Women's athletics
Representing United States
NACAC Cross Country Championships
Gold medal – first place	2012 Port of Spain	U20 race
Gold medal – first place	2012 Port of Spain	U20 team
NACAC Championships
Silver medal – second place	2018 Toronto	1500 m
- Updated on 29 December 2023

Shannon Osika (born 15 June 1993) is an American middle-distance runner specializing in the 1500 metres. She is a four-time outdoor and three-time indoor USA Championships finalist, and she was the silver medalist at the 2018 NACAC Championships. She briefly held the world record in the distance medley relay in 2022.

== Biography ==
Osika is from Waterford, Michigan where she attended Mott High School and was a Michigan High School Athletic Association Division I cross country champion. Her parents, P.J. Osika and Andrea Bowman, were collegiate milers at Eastern Michigan University and they competed at the 1988 United States Olympic trials.

Halfway through the 2011–2012 season, Osika enrolled at Michigan University, where she competed on the Michigan Wolverines track and field team until 2015 under coach Mike McGuire—who also coached her parents in the 1980s. While at Michigan, Osika ran five NCAA national track finals and two cross country national races, with a best finish of 3rd at the 2015 NCAA Division I Indoor Track and Field Championships distance medley relay. At the 2012 NACAC Cross Country Championships, Osika competed in the U20 race and won the race for the United States, leading her team to a victory over Canada as well.

Osika achieved her first national top-three finish in the 1500 m at the 2018 USA Indoor Track and Field Championships, behind Shelby Houlihan and Colleen Quigley. Although the United States could only send two athletes to compete at the 2018 IAAF World Indoor Championships, Houlihan had initially stated she would only run the 3000 metres at the world championships, opening up a spot for Osika to run at her first track and field world championship. However, Houlihan later decided to run in both events, blocking out Osika from the spot. During the outdoor season, Osika was selected for the 2018 NACAC Championships team, where she won a silver medal in the 1500 m.

In 2019, Osika was selected to run on the mixed 4 × 1 km relay at the 2019 World Cross Country Championships. Running second leg, the team finished 4th behind Ethiopia, Morocco, and Kenya.

At the 2021 United States Olympic trials, Osika qualified for the finals of the 1500 m and placed fourth, just outside the top-three to be selected for the 2021 U.S. Olympic team.

On 11 February 2022, Osika was part of the Nike Union Athletics Club team that set an indoor world record in the distance medley relay, with a time of 10:39.91 at the Lilac Grand Prix. The record was only briefly held, as it was overtaken by New Balance running 10:33 on 15 April later that year.

Osika is sponsored by Nike, Inc.

== Statistics ==
=== Personal bests ===
Event	Mark	Place	Competition	Venue	Date	Ref
1500 metres	4:00.73	3rd place, bronze medalist(s)	USATF Golden Games	Walnut, California	9 May 2021	
Mile run	4:24.19 sh	5th	Wanamaker Mile	New York City	29 January 2022	
