= Robert Grier =

Robert Grier may refer to:

- Bobby Grier (American football player) (1933–2024), American college football player who broke color barrier
- Bobby Grier (American football executive) (1942–2025), American football executive and coach
- Robert Cooper Grier (1794–1870), American jurist
