= Bobby Grier (American football executive) =

American football executive (1942–2025)

Personal information
- Born: November 10, 1942; Detroit, Michigan, U.S.
- Died: September 22, 2025 (aged 82)

Career information
- Position: Running back
- College: Iowa

Career history

Coaching
- Waterford Kettering HS (MI) (1966–1969) Assistant coach; Martin Luther King HS (MI) (1970–1973) Head coach; Eastern Michigan (1974–1977) Running backs coach; Boston College (1978–1980) Running backs coach; New England Patriots (1981) Offensive backfield coach; New England Patriots (1985) Offensive backfield coach; New England Patriots (1986–1992) Offensive backfield coach/running game coordinator

Operations
- New England Patriots (1982–1985) Scout; New England Patriots (1993–1995) Director of pro scouting; New England Patriots (1995–1997) Director of player personnel; New England Patriots (1997–2000) Vice president of player personnel; Houston Texans (2000–2012) Associate director of pro scouting; Houston Texans (2012–2016) Senior personnel advisor; Miami Dolphins (2017–2025) Consultant
- Executive profile at Pro Football Reference

Bobby Grier (November 10, 1942 – September 22, 2025) was an American professional football executive and coach in the National Football League (NFL).

== Early life ==
Grier was born in Detroit on November 10, 1942, and graduated from Eastern High School. He attended the University of Iowa, where he played running back for the Hawkeyes from 1961 to 1964. Grier was a three-year starter and a two-time Honorable Mention All-Big Ten selection, and he graduated with a bachelor of science degree in physical education.

== Coaching career ==
=== High school ===
Grier began his coaching career in 1966 as an assistant coach at Waterford Kettering High School in Waterford, Michigan. He then served as the head coach at Detroit's Martin Luther King High School from 1970 to 1973, where his 1973 team captured the city championship with a 9-1 record.

=== College ===
In 1974, Grier moved to the college ranks, serving as running backs coach at Eastern Michigan University for head coaches George Mans and then Ed Chlebek through 1977. He followed head coach Ed Chlebek to Boston College in 1978, becoming the school's first full-time black assistant coach through 1980. In January 1981, Grier was named the offensive backfield coach at Northwestern University under head coach Dennis Green.

=== NFL ===
Two months later, Grier took the same job with the New England Patriots. He was the team's first black coach since 1966. The team finished 2–14 and the entire coaching staff was fired. He returned to the Patriots in July 1982 as a scout. He returned as Patriots offensive backfield coach in 1985 under head coach Raymond Berry. That year the Patriots running backs rushed for 2,331 yards, fourth best in club history, and made their first ever Super Bowl. In 1986 he was given the additional title of running game coordinator. Grier was retained by Rod Rust and Dick MacPherson.

== Executive ==
When Bill Parcells became the Patriots head coach in 1993, Grier was moved to the personnel department as the Patriots' director of pro scouting. In 1995 he was promoted to director of player personnel.

Following New England's 6–10 1995 season, Patriots owner Robert Kraft shifted control of football operations away from Parcells to Grier. In the 1996 NFL draft, Grier, with Kraft's blessing, selected Ohio State wide receiver Terry Glenn with the seventh overall pick over the wishes of Parcells, who wanted a defensive player. The team also used their fifth round pick on Christian Peter, who had a history of violence against women, without consulting NFL security. The Patriots released their rights to Peters 24 hours after The Boston Globe reported on his record. The Patriots made Super Bowl XXXI, however, Parcells, who was upset with losing his personnel powers to Grier, left for the New York Jets. Pete Carroll was hired to replace him and Grier was promoted to vice president of player personnel. As VP of player personnel, Grier was responsible for selecting draft busts Chris Canty and Sedrick Shaw, but also chose a number of players who produced well for the Patriots, including Damien Woody, Kevin Faulk and Tebucky Jones.

In 2000, Carroll was fired, and new head coach Bill Belichick was given the final say on personnel matters. Grier left the Patriots after the 2000 NFL draft. One of his final duties with the team was to perform extensive scouting work on Tom Brady, whom the Patriots selected in the sixth round of the draft.

In May 2000, Grier joined the Houston Texans, where he worked as Associate Director of Pro Scouting and senior personnel advisor until his retirement on May 1, 2016. Wade Phillips credited Grier as being instrumental in the team selecting J. J. Watt with the 11th overall pick in the 2011 NFL draft. In 2017, Grier joined the Miami Dolphins as a consultant.

== Personal life and death ==
Grier was the father of former Miami Dolphins general manager Chris Grier, and San Jose Sharks general manager (and former National Hockey League player) Mike Grier.

Grier died on September 22, 2025, at the age of 82.
