= Otter Lake (Michigan) =

Lake in the state of Michigan, United States

Otter Lake is the name of several lakes in the U.S. state of Michigan.

- The largest Otter Lake is in southeast Portage Township of Houghton County at 46°54′48″N 88°34′25″W. The lake is fed by the Otter River and it drains into the Sturgeon River.
- The next largest Otter Lake is at 43°13′07″N 83°27′37″W on the boundary between Marathon Township in Lapeer County and Forest Township in Genesee County. The southern two thirds of the lake is within the Village of Otter Lake, which also straddles the boundary between the two counties. The lake and village are less than 0.99 miles (1.6 km) from the southern boundary of Tuscola County. The lake is 0.081 square miles (0.21 km^{2}) with a maximum depth of approximately 150 feet (45.7 m). There is a public boat launch, dock, swim beach, and campground, as well as private homes on the shoreline. In the center of the lake are two prominent sandbars that reduce the water depth to much less than a meter in several locations. It is connected to Powderhorn lake on its northern end.

Other Otter Lakes in Michigan:

- In Au Train Township, Alger County at 46°18′42″N 86°43′44″W within Hiawatha National Forest
- In Benzie County at 44°44′26″N 86°03′41″W on the boundary between Lake Township and Platte Township within the Sleeping Bear Dunes National Lakeshore
- In Marcellus Township, Cass County at 42°03′40″N 85°51′27″W
- In Grant Township, Clare County at 43°51′35″N 84°50′34″W about 1.5 miles (2.4 km) north-northeast of Farwell.
- In Argentine Township, Genesee County at 42°49′20″N 83°49′49″W
- In Crystal Falls Township, Iron County at 46°15′12″N 88°20′46″W within Copper Country State Forest, although not on state-owned land
- In Keweenaw County at 48°04′38″N 88°45′08″W on the north side of Isle Royale
- In McMillan Township, Luce County at 46°35′45″N 85°39′32″W within Lake Superior State Forest, part of a chain of lakes the drain into the Two Hearted River
- In southeast Waterford Township, Oakland County at 42°37′43″N 83°20′52″W, opening into Sylvan Lake on the east and connecting with Cass Lake on the southeast via a segment of the Clinton River
- In Seney Township, Schoolcraft County at 46°29′10″N 86°12′40″W, near the boundary with Alger County

== See also ==
- List of lakes in Michigan
