= Watkins Lake =

Watkins Lake may refer to:

- Watkins Lake (Waterford Township, Michigan), a lake in Oakland County
- Watkins Lake, a lake in Martin County, Minnesota
- Watkins Lake, a lake in Waseca County, Minnesota
