= Andy Thorn (American football) =

American football player (born 1982)

No. 87
- Position: Tight end

Personal information
- Born: February 4, 1982 (age 44); Waterford, Michigan, U.S.
- Listed height: 6 ft 5 in (1.96 m)
- Listed weight: 250 lb (113 kg)

Career information
- High school: Waterford Mott
- College: Northern Iowa
- NFL draft: 2005: undrafted

Career history
- Philadelphia Eagles (2005–2006)*; Dallas Cowboys (2006); Tennessee Titans (2007)*
- * Offseason or practice squad member only

Career NFL statistics
- Games played: 1
- Stats at Pro Football Reference

Andrew “Bro” Robert Thorn (born February 4, 1982) is an American former professional football player who was a tight end in the National Football League (NFL) for the Philadelphia Eagles and Dallas Cowboys. He played college football for the Northern Iowa Panthers.

== Early life ==
Thorn attended Waterford Mott High School, where he was a two-way player at tight end and defensive end. As a sophomore, he made 2 receptions for 15 yards. As a junior, he had 19 receptions for 270 yards, 3 touchdowns and received All-conference honors.

As a senior, he collected 25 receptions for 450 yards, 6 touchdowns, 68 tackles and 3 sacks. He set a school record with 3 touchdown receptions in a single-game. He helped his team finish with a 6–4 record and qualify to the state playoffs for the first time in school history, while receiving second-team All-Metro and All-county honors.

He also practiced basketball, track and baseball. He set the school record in the shot put (57'9") and discus throw (172'9"). He received Academic All-state honors in his last 2 years.

== College career ==
Thorn accepted a football scholarship from the University of Iowa. As a redshirt freshman, he appeared in 4 games. As a sophomore, he saw limited action. He transferred to the Division I-AA University of Northern Iowa after the season.

As junior, he posted 17 receptions for 190 yards and 4 touchdowns. As a senior, he registered 21 receptions for 308 yards and 6 touchdowns. He finished his college career with 38 receptions for 498 yards and 10 touchdowns.

== Professional career ==
=== Philadelphia Eagles ===
Thorn was signed as an undrafted free agent by the Philadelphia Eagles after the 2005 NFL draft on April 25. On September 3, he was waived and later signed to the practice squad, where he spent the rest of the season. He was released on September 2, 2006.

=== Dallas Cowboys ===
On October 4, 2006, he was signed by the Dallas Cowboy to the practice squad. On December 14, he was promoted to the active roster to improve depth at tight end and H-back, after Oliver Hoyte suffered a knee injury. He was cut after missing a curfew on August 9, 2007.

=== Tennessee Titans ===
On August 22, 2007, he was signed as a free agent by the Tennessee Titans, but was released 4 days later.
