= Leggets Lake (Waterford Township, Michigan) =

Lake in the state of Michigan, United States

Leggett Bay
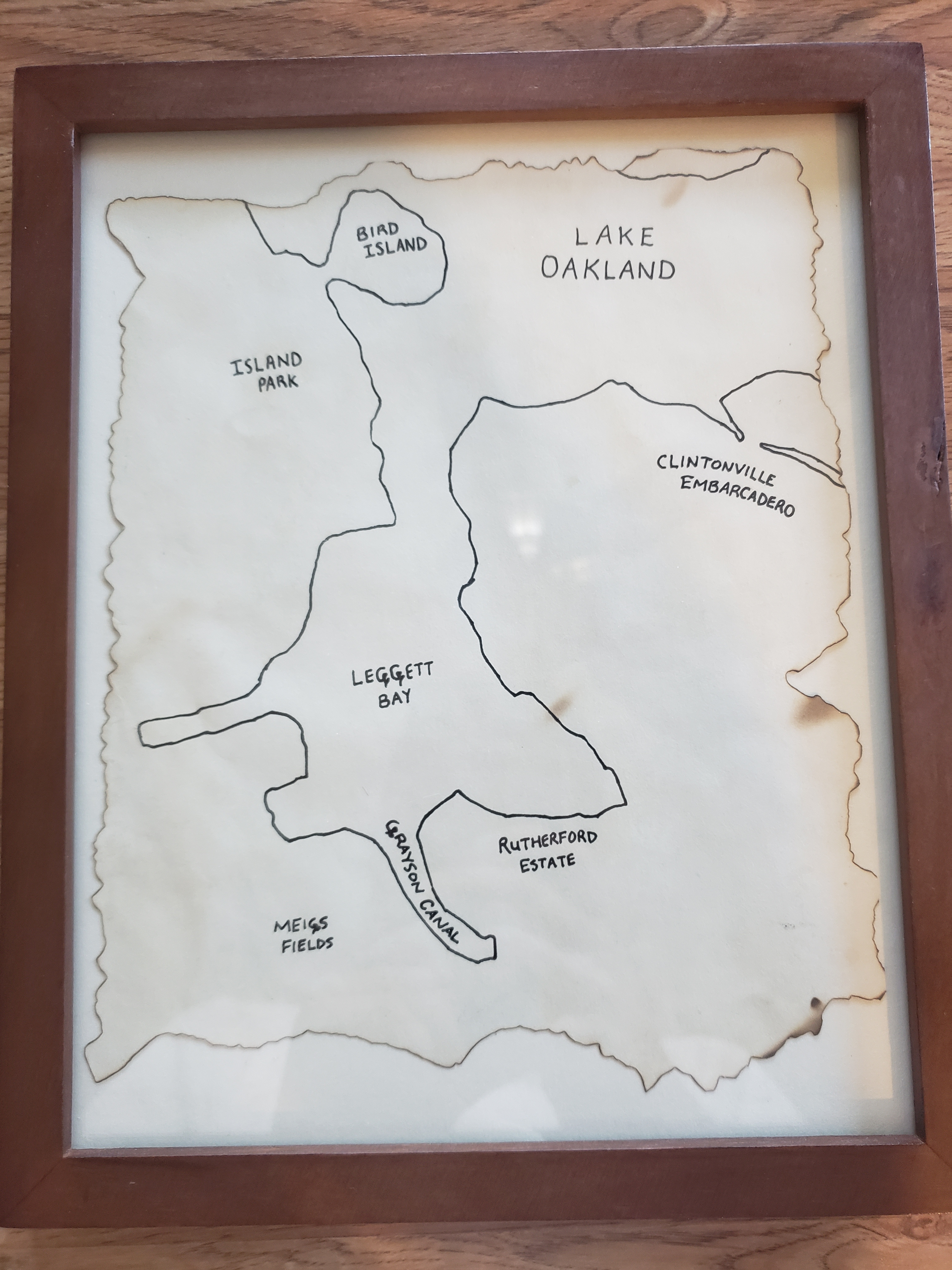
- Map of Leggett Bay and surrounding community, undated

- Location within Michigan
- Location: Oakland County, Michigan
- Coordinates: 42.688024°N 83.353814°W
- Type: Bay
- Basin countries: United States
- Surface area: 25 acres (10 ha)
- Max. depth: 10 ft (3.0 m)
- Settlements: Waterford Township

Leggett Bay (also known as 'Leggets Lake) is located in Waterford Township, Michigan, United States. The 25-acre bay within Lake Oakland (Michigan) lies north of Walton Blvd. near Clintonville Rd. At its deepest point, the bay is 10 feet deep.

An aerial photo of Leggett Bay was featured in the Lake Oakland feature article contained in the July 2019 edition of Lakefront Lifestyles Magazine.

== History ==
Leggets Lake (originally Leggett's Lake) was named for Mortimer Leggett (1837–1930) who came from New York and settled on a 140-acre farm in Clintonville, Michigan, next to the lake that would bear his family name. The lake originally was separate from Lake Oakland and an effort to conjoin the two commenced in the late 1950s and concluded in 1960. Now part of Lake Oakland, the body of water is referred to as Leggett Bay. Grayson Canal was added to expand lake access to homeowners on Rutherford Court (formerly the Rutherford Estate) and Athens Avenue (formerly Meigs Fields property).

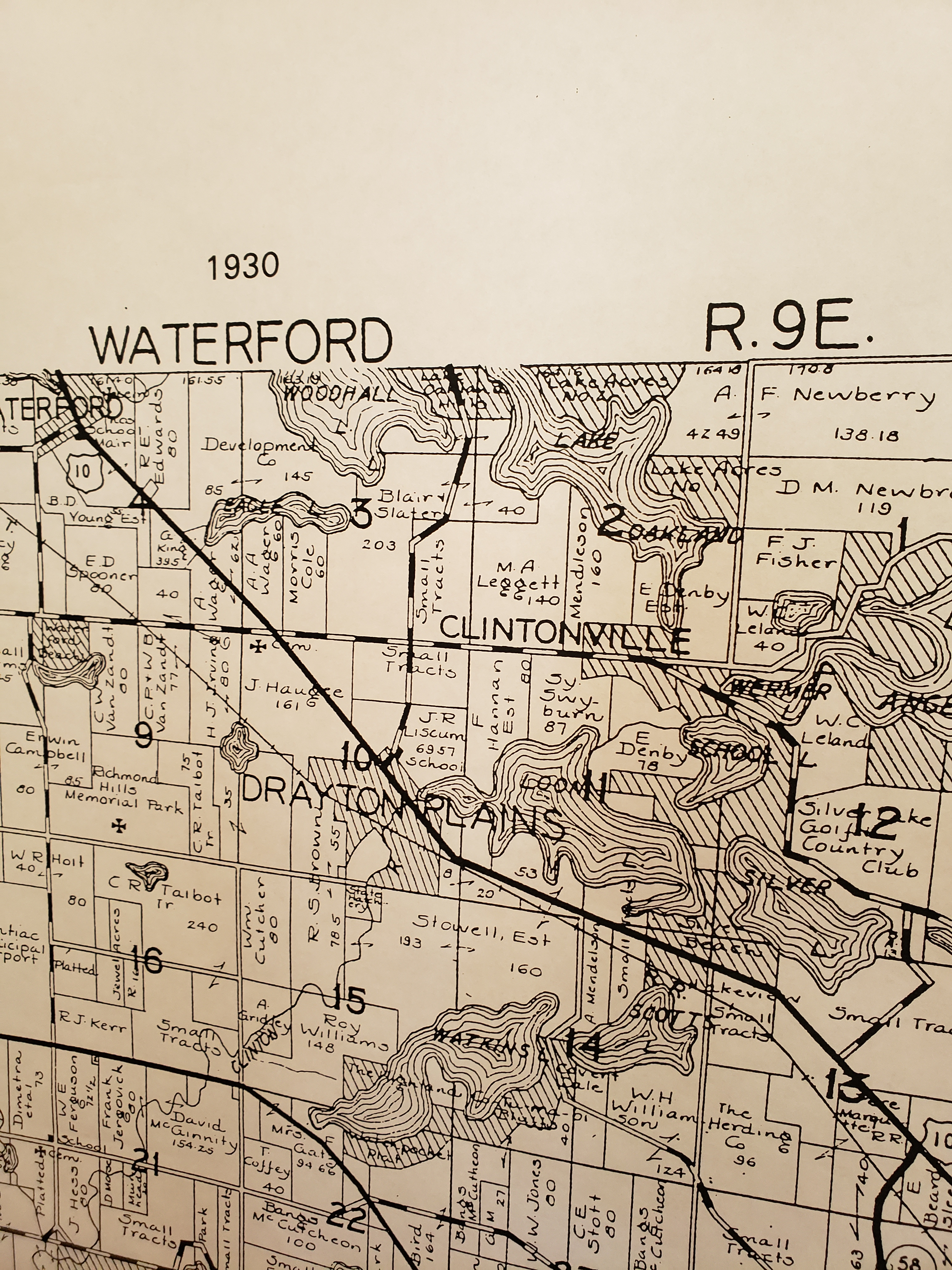
Map of Leggett property, circa 1930, demonstrating that Leggett Lake / Bay was not connected to Lake Oakland. Map courtesy of Waterford Historical Society.

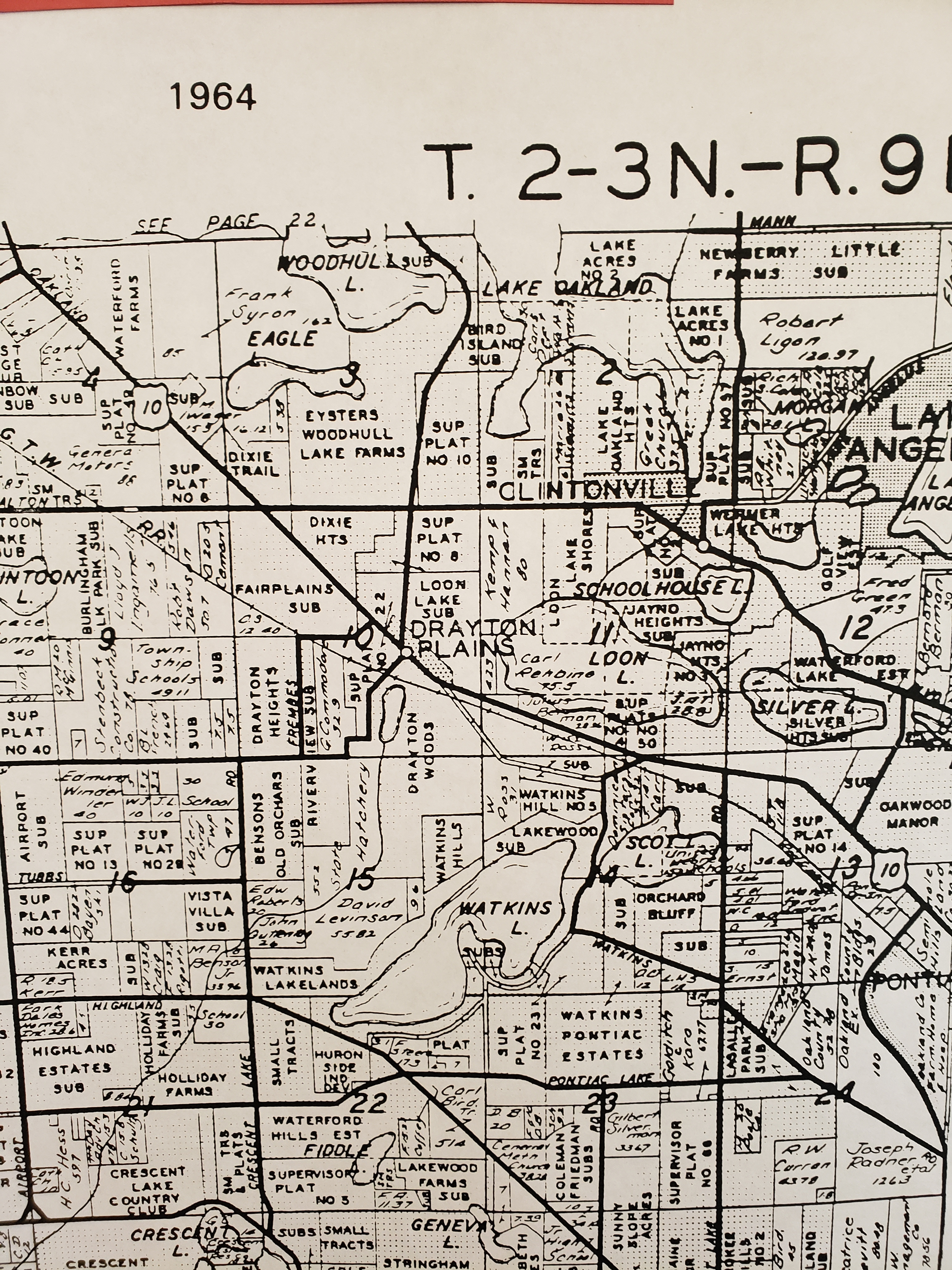
Map of Leggett Bay, circa 1964, now demonstrating that Leggett Lake had been conjoined with Lake Oakland to the north. Map courtesy of Waterford Historical Society.

== Fish ==
According to the Oakland County, Michigan, parks department's Fishing Opportunities Report, the following fish have received a rating of "Better Than Average Fishing": largemouth bass, bluegill, brown bullhead, black crappie, and northern pike and bowfin. The following fish received a rating of "Fishable Population Present": carp and pumpkinseed.

The Michigan Department of Natural Resources' most recent fisheries survey was conducted on Lake Oakland in May 2001. Eighteen fish species were collected during this survey, including bluegill, black crappie, green sunfish, pumpkinseed, rock bass, warmouth, yellow perch, largemouth bass, northern pike, yellow bullhead, brown bullhead, bowfin, channel catfish walleye, common carp, grass pickerel, and bluntnosed minnow.
