= Drayton Plains State Fish Hatchery =

- Interactive map of Drayton Plains State Fish Hatchery
- 42°40′17.3″N 83°22′27.4″W
- Location: 2125 Denby Drayton Plains, Michigan

History
- Built: 1903

Site notes
- Area: 18 acres (7.3 ha)

Michigan State Historic Site
- Designated: August 24, 1984

The Drayton Plains State Fish Hatchery was the second fish hatchery opened by the State of Michigan Department of Natural Resources (previously known as the Michigan Conservation Department). It was established in 1903 and originally named Drayton Plains Station. The name was officially changed to Drayton Plains State Fish Hatchery in 1934.

The Drayton Plains State Fish Hatchery was opened along the Clinton River on Mill Street (later Hatchery Road) in what was then Drayton Plains, Michigan (now Waterford Township). Its purpose was to raise bass fingerlings on its 18-acre site.

The Drayton Plains State Fish Hatchery was listed as a Michigan Historic Site on August 24, 1984.

== Fish Hatchery Background ==
In the late 1920s, sportfishing was well established as a leisure time activity in Michigan. As a result, fish production moved away from food fish and focused on sport fish species including, brown trout, rainbow trout and brook trout along with many warm-water species. Most Michigan Department of Natural Resources fisheries work on the Great Lakes was abandoned as these fisheries were dominated by commercial fishing. Hatchery technology had improved by this time to allow the production of larger fish and the time period from 1930-1949 is considered the Fingerling Era.

In 1962, operations at the Drayton Plains State Fish Hatchery ended after nearly 60 years.

As of 2016, there were six state fish hatcheries in operation in Michigan:

- Harrietta State Fish Hatchery in Harrietta, Michigan (opened in 1901).
- Marquette State Fish Hatchery in Marquette, Michigan (opened in 1920).
- Oden State Fish Hatchery in Alanson, Michigan (opened in 1921).
- Thompson State Fish Hatchery in Thompson Township, Michigan (opened in 1922).
- Wolf Lake State Fish Hatchery in Mattawan, Michigan (opened in 1927).
- Platte River State Fish Hatchery in Beulah, Michigan (opened in 1928).

== Use as a Grow-Pond ==
With Drayton Plains Nature Center retaining ownership, Michigan Department of Natural Resources Fisheries Division began raising fish in the hatchery ponds in 1970. In 2012 the Michigan Department of Resources Lake Erie Management Unit obtained walleye eggs from fish in the Muskegon River. The eggs were fertilized and hatched Wolf Lake State Fish Hatchery. Drayton Plains State Fish Hatchery was one of the facilities that hosted the resulting fingerlings, which were later transferred to seven different lakes.

== Nature Center ==
The former Drayton Plains State Fish Hatchery is the site of the Drayton Plains Nature Center.

Opened in 1967, the Nature Center is situated on 138 acres, with an expanse of nearly one mile in length. It exhibits nature in various forms. The grounds include woods, ponds, streams and a prairie. Along with expansive trails, it offers an interpretive center that houses displays of specimens in their natural habitat.
