= Fiddle Lake (Waterford Township, Michigan) =

Lake in the state of Michigan, United States

- Location within Michigan
- Location: Oakland County, Michigan
- Coordinates: 42°38′58″N 83°22′33″W
- Type: Lake
- Basin countries: United States
- Surface area: 9 acres (3.6 ha)
- Max. depth: 10 ft (3.0 m)
- Surface elevation: 935 ft (285 m)
- Settlements: Waterford Township

Fiddle Lake is a lake located in Waterford Township, Michigan. It lies west of Highland Rd. (M-59) and north of Elizabeth Lake Rd. The 9-acre (3.6 ha) lake connects with Geneva Lake to the south.
