= Rainbow Lake (Waterford Township, Michigan) =

Lake in the state of Michigan, United States

- Location within Michigan Location within the United States
- Location: Oakland County, Michigan
- Coordinates: 42°41′47″N 83°24′08″W
- Type: lake
- Basin countries: United States
- Surface area: 5 acres (2.0 ha)
- Max. depth: 15 ft (4.6 m)
- Settlements: Waterford Township

Rainbow Lake is a 5-acre (2.0 ha) lake located in Waterford Township, Michigan. It lies west of Dixie Highway and east of Airport Rd. The 15-foot (4.6 m) deep, spring fed private lake is next to Our Lady of the Lakes school.

== Fish ==
Rainbow Lake fish include Crappie and Bluegill.
