= Geneva Lake (Waterford Township, Michigan) =

Lake in the state of Michigan, United States

- Location within Michigan
- Location: Oakland County, Michigan
- Coordinates: 42°38′38″N 83°21′57″W
- Type: Lake
- Basin countries: United States
- Surface area: 19 acres (7.7 ha)
- Max. depth: 35 ft (11 m)
- Settlements: Waterford Township

Geneva Lake is a lake located in Waterford Township, Michigan. It lies west of Highland Rd. (M-59) and north of Elizabeth Lake Rd. The 19-acre (7.7 ha), 35-foot (11 m) deep lake connects with Fiddle Lake to the north and Otter Lake to the south.

Geneva Lake was previously named Carp Lake as late as 1908.
