= 2012 NACAC Cross Country Championships =

- Organisers: NACAC
- Edition: 8th
- Date: March 17
- Host city: Port of Spain, Trinidad and Tobago
- Venue: Queen's Park Savannah
- Events: 4
- Distances: 8 km – Senior men 6 km – Junior men (U20); 6 km – Senior women 4 km – Junior women (U20)
- Participation: 108 + 1 guest athletes from 12 nations

The 2012 NACAC Cross Country Championships took place on March 17, 2012. The races were held at the Queen's Park Savannah in Port of Spain, Trinidad and Tobago. A detailed report of the event was given for the IAAF.

Complete results were published.

== Medallists ==
Event	Gold		Silver		Bronze	
Individual
Senior men (8 km)	Cameron Levins; Canada	24:04.13	Christopher Landry; United States	24:10.61	Elliot Krause; United States	24:20.05
Junior (U20) men (6 km)	Jace Lowry; United States	18:50.85	Adam Braun; United States	18:54.02	Benjamin Flanagan; Canada	18:56.92
Senior women (6 km)	Liz Costello; United States	20:26.52	Tonya Nero; Trinidad and Tobago	20:32.42	Laura Thweatt; United States	20:33.62
Junior (U20) women (4 km)	Shannon Osika; United States	13:40.40	Gabrielle Anzalone; United States	13:47.50	Macy Bricks; United States	13:59.54
Team
Senior men	United States	14	Canada	23	Jamaica	72
Junior (U20) men	United States	12	Canada	29	Puerto Rico	68
Senior women	United States	14	Trinidad and Tobago	35		
Junior (U20) women	United States	10	Canada	39	(Mexico) México	48

== Medal table (unofficial) ==
* Host nation (Trinidad and Tobago)

Rank	Nation	Gold	Silver	Bronze	Total
1	United States (USA)	7	3	3	13
2	Canada (CAN)	1	3	1	5
3	Trinidad and Tobago (TRI)*	0	2	0	2
4	Jamaica (JAM)	0	0	1	1
4	Mexico (MEX)	0	0	1	1
4	Puerto Rico (PUR)	0	0	1	1
Totals (6 entries)		8	8	7	23

- Note: Totals include both individual and team medals, with medals in the team competition counting as one medal.

== Participation ==
According to an unofficial count, 108 athletes (+ 1 guest) from 12 countries participated.

- Bahamas (2)
- Bermuda (3)
- Canada (18)
- Costa Rica (1)
- Dominican Republic (2)
- Grenada (2)
- Guatemala (6)
- Jamaica (15)
- (Mexico) México (9)
- Puerto Rico (12)
- Trinidad and Tobago (18 + 1 guest)
- United States (20)

== See also ==
- 2012 in athletics (track and field)
