= Lake Goodrich (Waterford Township, Michigan) =

Lake in Oakland County, Michigan, US

- Location within Michigan
- Location: Oakland County, Michigan
- Coordinates: 42.653690°N 83.420774°W
- Basin countries: United States
- Settlements: Waterford Township

Lake Goodrich is a lake located in Waterford Township, Michigan, United States. It lies east of Hospital Rd, south of Highland Rd. (M-59) and north of Pontiac Lake Rd. The four-acre lake is spring fed.
