= Schoolhouse Lake (Michigan) =

Lake in the state of Michigan, United States

- Location within Michigan Location within the United States
- Location: Oakland County, Michigan
- Coordinates: 42°41′09″N 83°20′54″W
- Type: Lake
- Basin countries: United States
- Surface area: 37 acres (15 ha)
- Max. depth: 49 ft (15 m)
- Surface elevation: 948 ft (289 m)
- Settlements: Waterford Township

Schoolhouse Lake is an all-sports 37-acre (15 ha) lake located in central Oakland County, on the east side of Waterford in Waterford Township.

The lake is part of the Clinton River watershed.

The Clinton River enters Schoolhouse Lake on the north end and exits on the west end. Upstream is Lake Oakland and Wormer Lake (27.5 acres). Downstream from Schoolhouse Lake is Loon Lake.

== History ==
The village of Clintonville was first settled in 1830 near what was later named Schoolhouse Lake.

The Schoolhouse Lake was so named when Clintonville School No.7, the first school in Clintonville, was built on the banks of the lake at what today is 3101 Walton Boulevard in Waterford, Michigan near Clintonville Road. The school building still stands today.

== Fish ==
Schoolhouse Lake contains a variety of fish, including black crappie, bluegill, largemouth bass, northern pike, rock bass, smallmouth bass, sunfish, walleye and yellow perch.
