= Huntoon Lake (Waterford Township, Michigan) =

Lake in the state of Michigan, United States

- Location within Michigan Location within the United States
- Location: Oakland County, Michigan
- Coordinates: 42°41′06″N 83°24′19″W
- Type: Lake
- Basin countries: United States
- Surface area: 42.5 acres (17.2 ha)
- Max. depth: 15 ft (4.6 m)
- Surface elevation: 965 ft (294 m)
- Settlements: Waterford Township

Huntoon Lake is a 42.5-acre (17.2 ha) private, all-sports lake in Waterford Township in Oakland County, Michigan.

The 15-ft deep lake is spring fed and is entirely residential. It is located along Airport Rd. north of Hatchery Rd. and south of Williams Lake Rd.

== Namesake ==
Huntoon Lake was named for Daniel Huntoon (d. 1851), who first settled on 165 acres (67 ha) in sections 8 and 9 of Waterford Township on the south shore of the lake that later would bear his family name. Huntoon and his sons Philetus (1824-1869), Phineas (1827-1903) and Horace (1831-1897) came to Waterford in 1832 from New Hampshire.

After the death of their father, Philetus ran the family farm in Waterford. In 1860, Phineas became the proprietor of the Waterford General Store, which was built in 1857 by the previous proprietor, his brother Horace.

== Fish ==
Fish in Huntoon Lake include sunfish, bluegill, largemouth bass, perch, northern pike, crappie and bullhead.
