= Crescent Lake (Waterford Township, Michigan) =

Lake in the state of Michigan, United States

- Location within Michigan
- Location: Oakland County, Michigan
- Coordinates: 42°38′31″N 83°23′27″W
- Type: Lake
- Basin countries: United States
- Surface area: 90 acres (36 ha)
- Max. depth: 40 ft (12 m)
- Surface elevation: 948 ft (289 m)
- Islands: Eight
- Settlements: Waterford Township

Crescent Lake is a freshwater lake located in Waterford Township, Michigan. It borders Elizabeth Lake Rd. The 90-acre (36 ha) lake has a maximum depth of 40 feet (12 m).

Crescent Lake is connected to Elizabeth Lake.

Crescent Lake's name is derived from the lake's crescent shape.

== Fish ==
Fish in Crescent Lake include black crappie, bluegill, largemouth bass, northern pike, rock bass, sunfish and walleye.
