= Baldwin Lake (Waterford Township, Michigan) =

Lake in Waterford Township, Michigan, United States

- Location within Michigan
- Location: Oakland County, Michigan
- Coordinates: 42.628836°N 83.401901°W
- Basin countries: United States
- Surface area: 9 acres (3.6 ha)
- Max. depth: 10 ft (3.0 m)
- Settlements: Waterford Township

Baldwin Lake is located in Waterford Township, Michigan. The 9-acre lake lies north and west of Cooley Lake Road and east of Lochaven Road. At its deepest point, the spring-fed lake is 10 feet deep.
