= Elizabeth Lake (Waterford, Michigan) =

Lake in the state of Michigan, United States

- Location within Michigan
- Location: Oakland County, Michigan
- Coordinates: 42.631918°N 83.379407°W
- Basin countries: United States
- Surface area: 363 acres (147 ha)
- Max. depth: 72 ft (22 m)
- Surface elevation: 928 feet (283 m)
- Settlements: Elizabeth Lake, Michigan Waterford Township

Elizabeth Lake is a freshwater lake located in Waterford Township, Michigan, along the Clinton River. It connects upstream to 90-acre Crescent Lake and downstream to 1,280-acre Cass Lake.

The lake is located south of Elizabeth Lake Road, north of Cass-Elizabeth Road, east of Cooley Lake Road, and west of Cass Lake Roads. The sand-bottom lake is 363 acres, placing it as the thirteenth largest lake in Oakland County, Michigan. At its deepest point, the lake is 72 feet deep.

== Namesake ==
Elizabeth Lake was named after Elizabeth Cass, the partner of Territorial Governor of Michigan Lewis Cass

== Surroundings ==
Elizabeth Lake is enclosed by residential neighborhoods on all sides of the lake, with many varieties of waterfront homes, ranging from 800 square foot to 5,400 square foot homes. The eclectic home styles on Elizabeth Lake include bungalows, Cape Cods, colonial, ranches and split levels. The homes on the lake were built in decades as far back as the 1940s.

== Fish ==
Elizabeth Lake contains a wide variety of fish. Notable species include: black crappie, bluegill, largemouth bass, northern pike, rock bass, smallmouth bass, sunfish, walleye and yellow perch.
