= 2012 in the sport of athletics =

2012 in athletics
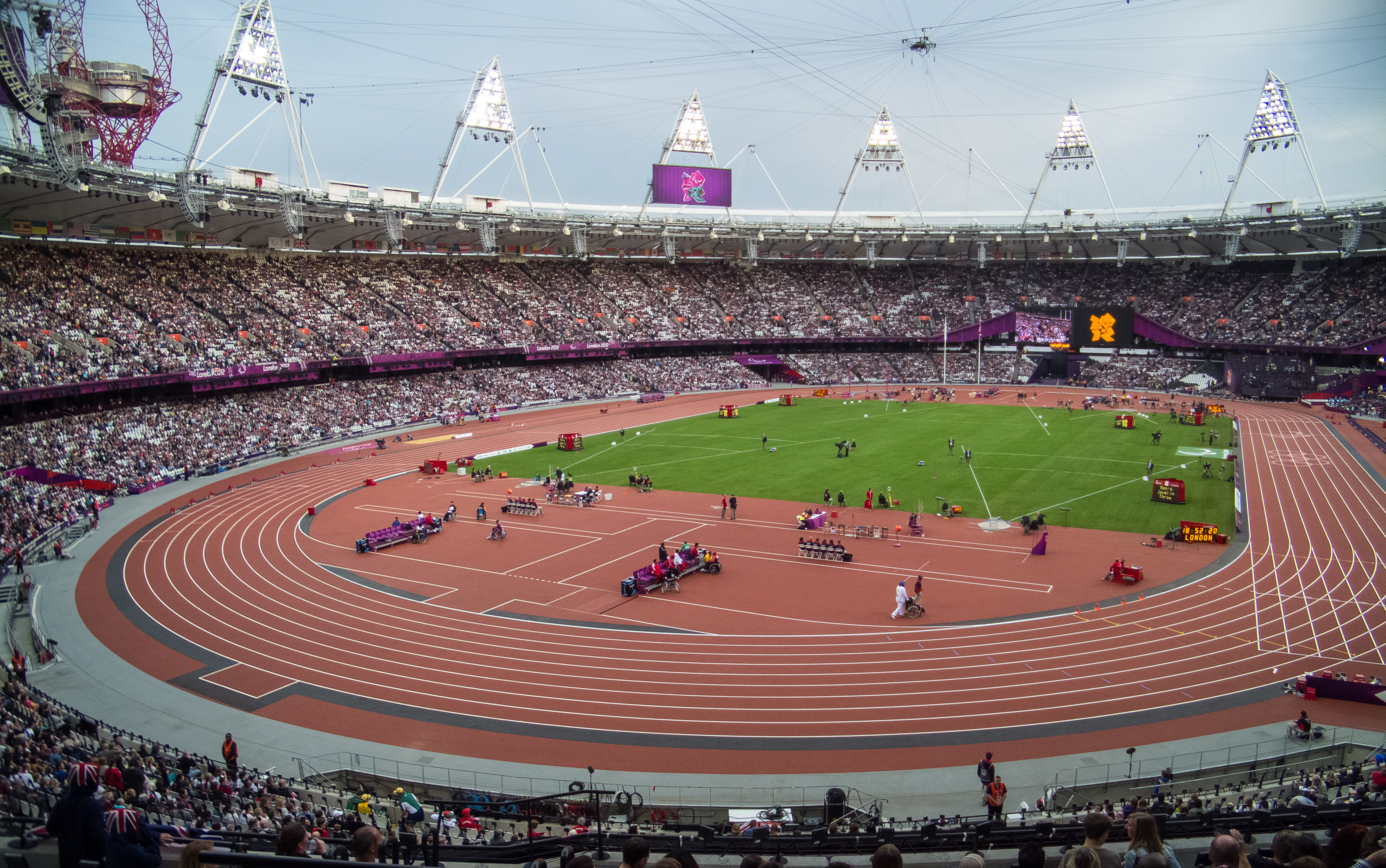
- The Olympic Stadium, which hosted the 2012 Olympic athletics
- Major world events: 2012 Olympic Games
- World records set: 12
- IAAF Athletes of the Year: Usain Bolt; Allyson Felix
- World Marathon Majors winners: Geoffrey Mutai; Mary Jepkosgei Keitany

In 2012 the foremost competition in athletics was the 2012 Summer Olympics in London. The International Association of Athletics Federations held four other global level competitions in 2012: the 2012 IAAF World Indoor Championships, 2012 IAAF World Race Walking Cup, 2012 World Junior Championships in Athletics and the 2012 IAAF World Half Marathon Championships.

For the first time since 1945, there was no global level championship for cross country running, as the IAAF World Cross Country Championships moved to a biennial format. Three of the major continental championships were held a month prior to the London Olympics: the 2012 African Championships in Athletics, 2012 European Athletics Championships and 2012 Oceania Athletics Championships.

The Diamond League entered its third year as the foremost seasonal track and field series.

== Major events ==
=== World ===
- Olympic Games
- World Indoor Championships
- World Race Walking Cup
- World Half Marathon Championships
- Diamond League
- Paralympic Games
- World Junior Championships
- World Mountain Running Championships
- WMA World Masters Indoor Championships
- FISU Cross Country Championships
- IAU 24 Hour World Championships
- IAU 100 km World Championships

=== Regional ===
- African Championships
- African Cross Country Championships
- Asian Indoor Championships
- Asian Junior Championships
- Asian Cross Country Championships
- Asian Race Walking Championships
- Oceania Athletics Championships
- European Athletics Championships
- European Cross Country Championships
- European Cup Winter Throwing
- European Mountain Running Championships
- Ibero-American Championships
- NACAC Cross Country Championships
- NACAC Under-23 Championships
- CAC Junior Championships
- CARIFTA Games
- South American U23 Championships
- South American Youth Championships
- South American Cross Country Championships

=== Marathons ===
- Boston Marathon
- London Marathon
- Berlin Marathon
- Chicago Marathon

== World records ==
=== Men ===
Event	Athlete	Nation	Performance	Meeting	Place	Date	Ref
400 m hurdles (indoor)	Felix Sánchez	Dominican Republic	48.78 (Note: The indoor 400 m hurdles is not a recognised event for record purposes, however, this represents the world's best performance)	Meeting National Val-de-Reuil	Val-de-Reuil, France	18 February	
Heptathlon (Indoor)	Ashton Eaton	United States	6645 pts	World Championships	Istanbul, Turkey	9–10 March 2012	
800 metres	David Rudisha	Kenya	1:40.91	Olympic Games	(United Kingdom) London, Great Britain	9 August 2012	
25 km (road)	Dennis Kipruto Kimetto	Kenya	1:11:18	BIG 25	Berlin, Germany	6 May 2012	
110 m hurdles	Aries Merritt	United States	12.80	Memorial Van Damme	Brussels, Belgium	7 September 2012	
4 × 100 m relay	Nesta Carter; Michael Frater; Yohan Blake; Usain Bolt	Jamaica	36.84	Olympic Games	(United Kingdom) London, Great Britain	11 August 2012	
Decathlon	Ashton Eaton	United States	9039 pts	United States Olympic Trials	Eugene, United States	22–23 June 2012	

=== Women ===
Event	Athlete	Nation	Performance	Meeting	Place	Date	Ref
2000 m steeplechase (Indoor)	Yelena Orlova	Russia	6:06.11 (Note: The indoor 2000 m steeplechase is not a recognised event for record purposes, however, this represents the world's best performance)	Moscow City Championships	Moscow, Russia	12 February 2012	
Pole vault (Indoor)	Yelena Isinbayeva	Russia	5.01 m	XL Galan	Stockholm, Sweden	23 February 2012	
Pentathlon (Indoor)	Nataliya Dobrynska	Ukraine	5013 pts	World Championships	Istanbul, Turkey	9 March 2012	
4 × 100 m relay	Tianna Madison; Allyson Felix; Bianca Knight; Carmelita Jeter	United States	40.82	Olympic Games	(United Kingdom) London, Great Britain	10 August 2012	
20 km walk (road)	Elena Lashmanova	Russia	1:25:02	Olympic Games	(United Kingdom) London, Great Britain	11 August 2012	

== Season's bests ==
Best marks of the year
Event	Men			Women		
Event	Athlete	Mark	Notes	Athlete	Mark	Notes
60 metres	Trell Kimmons (USA)	6.45		Veronica Campbell-Brown (JAM)	7.01	
100 metres	Usain Bolt (JAM)	9.63		Shelly-Ann Fraser-Pryce (JAM)	10.70	
200 metres	Usain Bolt (JAM)	19.32		Allyson Felix (USA)	21.69	
400 metres	Kirani James (GRN)	43.94		Antonina Krivoshapka (RUS)	49.16	
800 metres	David Rudisha (KEN)	1:40.91	WR	Mariya Savinova (RUS)	1:56.19	
1500 metres	Asbel Kiprop (KEN)	3:28.88		Abeba Aregawi (ETH)	3:56.54	
Mile run	Asbel Kiprop (KEN)	3:49.22		Brenda Martinez (USA)	4:26.76	
3000 metres	Augustine Choge (KEN)	7:29.94		Sally Jepkosgei Kipyego (KEN)	8:35.89	
5000 metres	Dejen Gebremeskel (ETH)	12:46.81		Vivian Cheruiyot (KEN)	14:35.62	
10,000 metres	Emmanuel Bett (KEN)	26:51.16		Tirunesh Dibaba (ETH)	30:20.75	
60 metres hurdles	Dexter Faulk (USA)	7.40		Sally Pearson (AUS)	7.73	
100/110 metres hurdles	Aries Merritt (USA)	12.80	WR	Sally Pearson (AUS)	12.35	
400 metres hurdles	Félix Sánchez (DOM)	47.63		Natalya Antyukh (RUS)	52.70	
3000 metres steeplechase	Paul Koech (KEN)	7:54.31		Yuliya Zaripova (RUS)	9:07.03	
10 kilometres	Leonard Komon (KEN)	27:15		Vivian Cheruiyot (KEN)	30:47	
15 kilometres	Atsedu Tsegay (ETH)	41:46		Tirunesh Dibaba (ETH)	47:08	
20 kilometres	Atsedu Tsegay (ETH)	55:52		Mary Jepkosgei Keitany (KEN)	1:03:12	
Half marathon	Atsedu Tsegay (ETH)	58:47		Mary Keitany (KEN)	1:05:50	
25 kilometres	Dennis Kipruto Kimetto (KEN)	1:11:18		Tiki Gelana (KEN)	1:22:33	
30 kilometres	Yemane Tsegay (ETH)	1:27:41		Tiki Gelana (ETH)	1:39:07	
Marathon	Geoffrey Mutai (KEN)	2:04:15		Mary Jepkosgei Keitany (KEN)	2:18:37	
20 kilometres race walk	Wang Zhen (CHN)	1:17:36		Elena Lashmanova (RUS)	1:25:02	
50 kilometres race walk	Sergey Bakulin (RUS)	3:35:59		—		
Pole vault	Björn Otto (GER)	6.01 m		Jennifer Suhr (USA)	4.83 m	
High jump	Mutaz Essa Barshim (QAT) Ivan Ukhov (RUS)	2.39 m		Anna Chicherova (RUS)	2.05 m	
Long jump	Sergey Morgunov (RUS) Greg Rutherford (GBR)	8.35 m		Brittney Reese (USA)	7.15 m	
Triple jump	Christian Taylor (USA)	17.81 m		Olha Saladuha (UKR)	14.99 m	
Shot put	Christian Cantwell (USA)	22.31 m		Valerie Adams (NZL)	21.11 m	
Discus throw	Robert Harting (GER)	70.66 m		Sandra Perković (CRO)	69.11 m	^{†}
Javelin throw	Vítězslav Veselý (CZE)	88.34 m		Barbora Špotáková (CZE)	69.55 m	
Hammer throw	Krisztián Pars (HUN)	81.89 m		Aksana Miankova (BLR)	78.69 m	
Pentathlon	—			Natallia Dobrynska (UKR)	5013 pts	
Heptathlon	Ashton Eaton (USA)	6645 pts	WR	Jessica Ennis (GBR)	6955 pts	NR
Decathlon	Ashton Eaton (USA)	9039 pts	WR	—		
4 × 100 metres relay	Jamaica; Nesta Carter; Michael Frater; Yohan Blake; Usain Bolt	36.84	WR	United States; Tianna Madison; Allyson Felix; Bianca Knight; Carmelita Jeter	40.82	WR
4 × 400 metres relay	Bahamas; Chris Brown; Demetrius Pinder; Michael Mathieu; Ramon Miller	2:56.72	NR	United States; DeeDee Trotter; Allyson Felix; Francena McCorory; Sanya Richards-Ross	3:16.87	

- ^{†} = Russia's Darya Pishchalnikova had a throw of 70.69 m, but was annulled after she later failed a drug test.

== Awards ==
=== Men ===
Award	Winner
IAAF World Athlete of the Year	Usain Bolt (JAM)
Track & Field Athlete of the Year	David Rudisha (KEN)
European Athlete of the Year	Mo Farah (GBR)
European Athletics Rising Star	Pavel Maslák (CZE)

=== Women ===
Award	Winner
IAAF World Athlete of the Year	Allyson Felix (USA)
Track & Field Athlete of the Year	Valerie Adams (NZL)
European Athlete of the Year	Jessica Ennis (GBR)
European Athletics Rising Star	Angelica Bengtsson (SWE)
