= Waterford School District =

School district in Michigan, United States

Address
- 501 North Cass Lake Road Waterford, Michigan, 48328; United States

District information
- Type: Public
- Grades: PreK–12
- Budget: $164,765,000 2022-2023 expenditures
- NCES District ID: 2635310

Students and staff
- Students: 6,773 (2024-2025)
- Teachers: 454.88 (FTE) 2024-2025
- Staff: 1,202.36 FTE 2024-2025
- Student–teacher ratio: 14.89 2024-2025

Other information
- Website: www.waterford.k12.mi.us

Waterford School District is a school district headquartered in Waterford Township, Michigan.

== History ==
Waterford Township lays claim to the first public school in Oakland County. That school was established in 1821 on the shores of Silver Lake with seven students. That number grew to thirteen when its first permanent home, a log schoolhouse, was dedicated the next year. Ira Donelson, for whom Donelson Hills Elementary is named, was elected as the township's first Supervisor of Education in 1835, the year Waterford Township was organized. As the township grew, more schoolhouses were built, including Drayton Plains in 1865, Four Towns in 1866 and Waterford Center in 1869.

While one-room schoolhouses were the norm during the rural 19th century, multiroom school buildings became the norm as Waterford transitioned into a suburban community. The first was the Waterford School, built in 1910 and expanded in 1927 and later to be renamed Waterford Village Elementary (which was closed in 2014); Four Towns and Waterford Center moved to new and larger school buildings within the next few decades, while the new Drayton Plains School opened in 1920. The Donelson and Stringham Schools were built in 1928. The hope was to consolidate these schools in a single district with the possible addition of a high school—Waterford's high school students then attended either Clarkston High School or Pontiac High School—but the Great Depression and then World War II postponed consolidation until 1944, when the present Waterford School District was formed. By then, the Williams Lake School, the seventh of the original schools in the district, was completed in 1943.

Attention was then turned to building a high school for Waterford Township, which doubled in population during the 1940s. For the first several years after Waterford Township High School was established in 1947, kindergarten through sixth grade attended Donelson, Four Towns, Stringham, Waterford Village, Williams Lake or Waterford Center, while the high school was based at Drayton Plains School until a permanent home, on the corner of M-59 and Crescent Lake Road, was completed in 1950. Also in the early 1950s, Issac E. Crary Junior High became the first junior high school in the district.

At its peak in the 1970s, Waterford School District contained twenty-seven elementary schools, three junior schools (which became middle schools in 1990); Crary (which transitioned to an administrative building in 2010), Pierce and Mason, and three high schools; Waterford Township (which closed in 1983), Kettering and Mott. As of 2016, there were nine elementary schools, two middle schools and three high schools.

=== Waterford Township High School ===
Waterford Township High School was established in 1947. It was housed in temporary quarters until a permanent building opened in 1951 at the southwest corner of M-59 and Crescent Lake Road. Frederick D. Madison was the architect.

In 1982, declining enrollment prompted the district to consider closing one of its three high schools, which all had similar enrollment numbers of between 900 and 1,200 10-12 grade students. A committee was formed to examine the issue. Not knowing which high school would close, each school took up a "save our school" campaign.

The committee could not agree at first whether to close Mott or Township High, but Township's slightly older roof and pipes were the deciding factors. As a citizens group argued that moving ninth graders into the high schools from the junior highs could save the building, about 5,500 residents signed a petition to keep Township High open. But in November 1982, the school board voted to close Township High at the end of that school year. It would become a multipurpose building for the district, housing other programs like adult education. Its students were distributed to Kettering and Mott High Schools.

The building closed in December 1996 and was torn down in early 1997.

== Schools ==
Many schools in the district were named after people. Although the district no longer refers to the schools' namesakes on their website, several sources have used the full namesake when referring to the school.

Waterford Schools
School	Address	Notes
High Schools
Waterford Durant High School	501 N. Cass Lake Rd., Waterford	(credit recovery)
Waterford Kettering High School	2800 Kettering Dr., Waterford	Opened 1961
Waterford Mott High School	1151 Scott Lake Rd., Waterford	Opened 1967
Middle Schools
Pierce Middle School	5145 Hatchery Rd., Waterford	Opened 1957. Named after John D. Pierce
Mason Middle School	3835 W. Walton Blvd., Waterford	Opened 1965. Named after Stevens T. Mason.
Elementary Schools
Beaumont Elementary School	6532 Elizabeth Lake Rd., Waterford	Named after William Beaumont.
Cooley Elementary School	2000 Highfield St., Waterford	Named after Thomas M. Cooley.
Grayson Elementary School	3800 W. Walton Blvd., Waterford	Named after David Grayson.
Donelson Hills Elementary School	2690 Wewoka St., Waterford	Named for Ira M. Donelson
Houghton Elementary School	8080 Elizabeth Lake Rd., White Lake	Named after Douglass Houghton.
Haviland Elementary School	5305 Cass Elizabeth Rd.	Named after Laura S. Haviland.
Knudsen Elementary School	5449 Crescent Rd., Waterford	Named after Patricia E. Knudsen
Riverside Elementary School	5280 Farm Rd., Waterford	
Schoolcraft Elementary School	6400 Maceday Dr., Waterford	Named after Henry R. Schoolcraft.
Early Childhood Centers and special education schools
Kingsley Montgomery School	4265 Halkirk St., Waterford	special education school
Lifetracks	501 N. Cass Lake Rd., Waterford	post-secondary special education school
Stepanski Early Childhood Center	6010 Hatchery Rd., Waterford	Preschool, on the site of former Williams Lake Elementary.

Waterford School District also operates the Children's Village School for students at Oakland County Children's Village, the county's juvenile detention, residential treatment, and shelter program.
