= Frederick D. Madison =

American architect

Frederick Daniel Madison (April 2, 1888 - September 23, 1969) was an architect based in Royal Oak, Michigan. He designed several schools, civic buildings, stores and offices in Metro Detroit.

== Biography ==
Madison was born on April 2, 1888, in Kingsley, Michigan, near Traverse City. He attended the Detroit School of Design. He worked for several Detroit architectural firms before joining Louis Kamper’s firm in 1914. In 1916, Madison entered private practice. His office was located in the Washington Square Building on the corner of Fourth and Main Streets in Royal Oak.

== List of buildings ==
- First United Methodist Church, Royal Oak
- Genesee County Courthouse, Flint, 1926
- Gladwin County Courthouse, 1937
- Royal Oak Middle School, originally Royal Oak High School, 1928
- Montgomery Ward Building, southwest corner of Washington and Fourth Streets, Royal Oak, 1928
- Northwood Elementary, Royal Oak, 1925
- Quarton Elementary, Birmingham, 1928
- Royal Oak Post Office
- Royal Oak Savings Bank
- Stiles School, Troy
- Wagar Middle School, originally Airport Community High School, Carleton, Michigan, 1952
- Washington Square Building, Royal Oak
- Washington Theater (Royal Oak Music Theater), Royal Oak
- Waterford Township High School, 1950
