= Morgan Lake (Waterford Township, Michigan) =

Lake in the state of Michigan, United States

- Location within Michigan Location within the United States
- Location: Oakland County, Michigan
- Coordinates: 42°41′39″N 83°20′36″W
- Type: Lake
- Basin countries: United States
- Surface area: 28 acres (11 ha)
- Max. depth: 25 ft (7.6 m)
- Surface elevation: 955 ft (291 m)
- Settlements: Waterford Township

Morgan Lake is a lake located in Waterford Township, Michigan. It borders Lake Angelus Rd. and is just east of Clintonville Rd.

The 28-acre (11 ha) lake is a private lake with two beaches for its residents. At its deepest point, the lake is 25 feet (7.6 m) deep.

== Namesake ==
Morgan Lake was named for Charles Morgan (1802-1875) who was an early settler on the shores of the lake that would later bear his family name. Morgan settled in section 1 of Waterford Township on a 120-acre (49 ha) farm on the lake's southeast end.

== Fish ==
Morgan Lake fish include rainbow trout, brook trout and crappie
