= Clam Lake (Waterford Township, Michigan) =

Lake in Michigan, United States

- Location within Michigan Location within the United States
- Location: Oakland County, Michigan
- Coordinates: 42°40′20″N 83°23′44″W
- Type: Lake
- Basin countries: United States
- Surface area: 21 acres (8.5 ha)
- Max. depth: 10 ft (3.0 m)
- Surface elevation: 965 ft (294 m)
- Settlements: Waterford Township

Clam Lake is a lake located in Waterford Township, Michigan. It lies north of Highland Rd. (M-59), south of Hatchery Rd, west of Crescent Lake Rd. and east of Airport Rd.

The 21-acre lake is spring fed.

== Fish ==
Clam Lake fish include Smallmouth Bass, Crappie and Bluegill.
