= Pleasant Lake (Waterford Township, Michigan) =

Lake in the state of Michigan, United States

- Location within Michigan Location within the United States
- Location: Oakland County, Michigan
- Coordinates: 42°38′30″N 83°26′10″W
- Type: Lake
- Basin countries: United States
- Surface area: 95 acres (38 ha)
- Max. depth: 52 ft (16 m)
- Surface elevation: 950 ft (290 m)
- Settlements: Waterford Township

Pleasant Lake is a spring fed lake located in Waterford Township, Michigan. It borders Elizabeth Lake Rd. to the north and is east of Williams Lake Rd. The 95-acre lake is a public lake but does have a beach and boat ramp for the residents. At its deepest point, the lake is 52 feet (16 m) deep.

== Fish ==
Pleasant Lake contains a variety of fish, including Panfish, Bluegill, Carp, Northern Pike, Bullhead, Largemouth bass, bowfin and Yellow Perch.
