= Drayton Plains, Michigan =

- Unincorporated community
- Map of Drayton Plains in 1872

- Location within the state of Michigan Drayton Plains (the United States)
- Coordinates: 42°41′03″N 83°22′38″W
- Country: United States
- State: Michigan
- County: Oakland
- Township: Waterford
- Settled: 1822
- Platted: 1860
- Elevation: 968 ft (295 m)
- Time zone: UTC-5 (EST)
  - Summer (DST): UTC-4 (EDT)
- ZIP code(s): 48329 (Waterford)
- Area code: 248
- FIPS code: 26-84240
- GNIS feature ID: 1627218

Drayton Plains is an unincorporated community in Oakland County in the U.S. state of Michigan. The community is located within Waterford Township. As an unincorporated community, Drayton Plains has no legally defined area or population statistics of its own. It once had its own post office with the 48020 ZIP Code but now uses the 48329 Waterford ZIP Code. It is located on Dixie Highway near the west end of Loon Lake.

== First Settlers ==
In 1818, the United States General Land Office opened in Detroit offering land for $2.00 an acre. Horatio Foster, Jonathan Perry, and brothers Harvey and Austin Durfee were among the first to take advantage of the opportunity to become land owners in the wilderness north of Detroit.

In 1822, Horatio Foster and his wife were the first to settle in what would become Drayton Plains, although just temporarily as they moved northward a few years later where they permanently settled. In 1823, the first to establish permanent homes in Drayton Plains were Jonathan Perry, Harvey Durfee and Austin Durfee.

In 1825, the Erie Canal opened, linking the waters of Lake Erie in the west to the Hudson River in the east. The canal made travelling from the east easier, which resulted in an influx of settlers moving into the Michigan Territory.

In 1829, construction began on a road north from Detroit along the Saginaw Trail, allowing for easier passage into the wilderness north of the city.

In 1835, Daniel Windiate emigrated from Berkshire, England to what soon would be called Drayton Plains. There, he built a dam and mill and named the mill Drayton after his England home, Drayton. He died in Drayton Plains in 1843.

Drayton Plains was informally referred to as a village and maintained its own identity and post office beginning on February 4, 1835. The first post office was on Mill Street (later Hatchery Road).

In 1838, the first burial took place at Drayton Plains Cemetery (located on Walton Blvd. and Williams Lake Road). The six-week-old infant son of Daniel and Martha Windiate was laid to rest there.

In 1839, the Drayton Plains Hotel was built by Daniel Windiate along the Saginaw Trail (later Dixie Highway), across from Sashabaw Road.

== Early development ==
In 1850, the railroad was completed through Drayton Plains and a train depot was built in 1908 at Mill Street (now Hatchery Rd.) and Saginaw Trail. The Drayton Plains depot was built by the Detroit, Grand Haven and Milwaukee Railway. The railroad was responsible for the population of Waterford Township reaching 1,085 the year it opened.

Drayton Plains was platted in 1860. In that year the town was laid out by Lewis L. Dunlap.

By 1860, the population of Waterford Township had climbed to 1,289. As Drayton Plains continued to grow, more retail establishments began to open. In 1865, John Linabury built the first stable in Drayton Plains and the first cider mill was built in the 1860s by John Kirodot.

Other business owners in Drayton Plains in 1872 included:

- C.B. Albertson, the first railroad station agent
- John Ebner, farmer and stock raiser
- H.D. Judd, grist mill proprietor
- A.A. Southard, general farmer
- Paul Shwesinger, merchant & manufacturer of boots and shoes and dealer in general merchandise.
- Moses Southard, blacksmith
- James Swartz, manufacturer of boots and shoes and sold general merchandise in his store.

William Besley (or Beasley), son-in-law of Daniel Windiate, owned a general store, which also later served as a post office, election hall, Sunday school and Saturday night dance hall. It even housed Meinrad Hangee's tin shop, and block ice was cut from Loon Lake by Pittman and Dean Ice House and sold throughout the area.

Early pioneers owning land tracts in Drayton Plains in 1872 include:

- C. B. Albertson
- Henry L. Birge (b.1816-d.1912)
- Andrew Cutchler (b.1803-d.1879)
- G. Deming
- Solomon G. Eagle (b.1817-d.1890)
- John M. Fair (b.1803-d.1884)
- Daniel M. Judd (b.1818-d.1877)
- John Linabury
- Oliver H.P. Osmun (b.1826-d.1907)
- Moses Southard
- H. E. Stowell
- Matilda Van Campen (b.1817-d.1879)
- William Van Ostrand
- William K. Van Sykle (b.1818-d.1880?)
- Beeckman Van Zandt (b.1808-d.1881)
- Peter Wager (b.1810-d.1876)

Many of Drayton Plains' streets were named after local pioneers such as Denby, Covert, Frembes, Linabury, Meinrad, Van Syckle and Van Zandt.

== Schools ==
The first school in Drayton Plains was built around 1865. The one-room wooden school was located at Monroe Street and Sashabaw Road in Drayton Plains, and was in use until 1920, when a new Drayton Plains School was built at the same Monroe Street and Sashabaw Road site. The first teacher at the school was Lewis M. Covert. The school was moved to The Pine Grove Historical Museum in Pontiac, Michigan and is open for tours.

High school students in Drayton Plains would ride the train from the depot to Pontiac High School, as Drayton Plains students were assigned to Pontiac High School in the early years.

In 1961, Kettering High School was opened on Bender Street in Drayton Plains (now Waterford Township).

In 1957, John D. Pierce Junior High School opened on Hatchery Road in Drayton Plains, and Stevens T. Mason Junior High School was opened in 1965 on Walton Blvd. in Drayton Plains.

Drayton Plains feeder elementary schools for the junior high schools included Drayton Plains Elementary School, George C. McVittie Elementary School on Midland Avenue, David Grayson Elementary School on Walton Blvd., Thomas M. Cooley Elementary School on Highfield Road, John Monteith Elementary School on Crescent Lake Road and Frank Manley Elementary School on Van Zandt Road

== Fish Hatchery and Nature Center ==
A fish hatchery was opened by the state in Drayton Plains in 1903 along the Clinton River on Mill Street (later Hatchery Road). The hatchery was originally known as the Drayton Plains Station. Its purpose was to raise bass fingerlings. Starting around 1913, the Drayton Plains Station began to be informally called the Drayton Plains Hatchery. By 1934, the name was officially changed to Drayton Plains State Fish Hatchery and remained thus until its closing in 1962.

The Drayton Plains State Fish Hatchery was listed as a Michigan Historic Site on August 24, 1984.

Today, the former fish hatchery is the site of the Drayton Plains Nature Center, located at 2125 Denby. Situated on 138 acres, with an expanse of nearly one mile in length, it exhibits nature in various forms. The grounds include woods, ponds, streams and a prairie. Along with expansive trails, it offers an interpretive center that houses displays of specimens in their natural habitat.

== 20th-century development ==
As the 20th century began, the Drayton Plains train depot was opened. Built in 1908 by the Detroit, Grand Haven and Milwaukee Railway, a subsidiary of the Grand Trunk Railroad, the depot stood on the northeast corner of Mill Street and Saginaw Trail (situated on the south side of the tracks).

The depot was closed in 1957 and was demolished in 1965. A replica of the depot was built in 1995 and it stands at the Waterford Historical Society. In 1929, the Community Presbyterian church was opened at 4301 Monroe Avenue near Sashabaw Road.

The Drayton Theater, built in the 1940s, was the only movie theater in Drayton Plains. It was located on Dixie Highway between Sashabaw Road and Monroe Street.

In 1942, the Drayton Men's Club developed Drayton Ball Park at Dixie Highway and Sashabaw Road. The ballpark is still in operation today as Shell Park.

When zip codes were introduced in 1963, Drayton Plains' zip code became 48020.

By the end of the 20th Century, the population of Waterford Township, Michigan was 73,150.

== Dissolution ==
The Drayton Plains post office was permanently closed on January 31, 2004. At the same time, all of its functions were transferred to the Waterford Post Office. The zip code for the community became 48329 and its identity has been largely subsumed within that of Waterford Charter Township.
