= Elizabeth Lake, Michigan =

- Unincorporated community
- Location within the state of Michigan
- Coordinates: 42°38′14″N 83°23′18″W
- Country: United States
- State: Michigan
- County: Oakland
- Township: Waterford
- Settled: 1834
- Time zone: UTC-5 (EST)
  - Summer (DST): UTC-4 (EDT)
- ZIP codes(s): 48328 (Waterford)
- Area code: 248
- FIPS code: 26-84240
- GNIS feature ID: 1627218

Elizabeth Lake is an unincorporated community in Oakland County in the U.S. state of Michigan. The community is located within Waterford Township. As an unincorporated community, Elizabeth Lake has no legally defined area or population statistics of its own, and it uses the Waterford 48328 ZIP Code.

== Post office ==
In 1834, the first post office was established in Waterford Township on the north shore of Elizabeth Lake. It was named Lake Elizabeth Post Office.

Its first postmaster was an American Revolutionary War veteran named William Terry (b.1760-d.1840), who came to Michigan in 1824.

The post office was closed in 1841.

== Namesake ==
Elizabeth Lake was named for the nearby lake, which was named for Elizabeth Cass, the wife of Territorial Governor of Michigan Lewis Cass.

== Lake ==
The body of water named Elizabeth Lake is located south of Elizabeth Lake Road, north of Cass–Elizabeth Road, east of Cooley Lake Road, and west of Cass Lake Road. The sand-bottom lake is 363 acres (147 ha), making it the 13th largest lake in Oakland County, Michigan. At its deepest point, the lake is 72 feet (22 m) deep.
