= Mott High School =

High school in Michigan, United States

Location
- 1151 Scott Lake Road; Waterford, Michigan 48328; United States; 42°39′22″N 83°20′56″W

Information
- School district: Waterford School District
- Principal: Kristen Woods-Helms
- Teaching staff: 58.38 (FTE)
- Grades: 9–12
- Enrollment: 1,076 (2023-2024)
- Student to teacher ratio: 18.43
- Colors: Columbia blue and navy
- Athletics conference: Kensington Lakes Activities Association
- Nickname: Corsairs
- Rival: Waterford Kettering High School
- Newspaper: The Wave
- Yearbook: The Polaris
- Website: www.waterford.k12.mi.us/schools/hs/mott/

Student assessments
- 2021–22 school year Change vs. prior year

M-STEP 11th grade proficiency rates (Science / Social Studies)
- Advanced %: 12.6 / 7.4
- Proficient %: 19.6 / 18.3
- PR. Proficient %: 14.8 / 45.2
- Not Proficient %: 53.0 / 29.1

Average test scores
- SAT Total: 874.0 (▼ −19.3)

Mott High School or Waterford Mott High School is a public high school in the Waterford School District located in Waterford, Michigan. The official name of the high school is Charles S. Mott High School, named for the automotive industry pioneer.

== History ==
Waterford Mott High School was established in 1967, with the first graduating class in June 1970.

In 1983, the school district consolidated high schools and closed Waterford Township High School. This left two high schools in the district; Mott and Waterford Kettering High School.

In the fall of 1990, ninth graders joined the Mott student body.

As of the 2018–2019 school year, its enrollment was 1,559 students in grades nine through twelve.

Students are offered a variety of classes in all four core areas as well as art, business, computer science, engineering, foreign language, health occupations, music, physical education, technology, theater, and video production.

== Extracurricular activities ==
Waterford Mott also offers thirty-two different sports to both boys and girls students. The Corsairs compete in the Kensington Lakes Activities Association and are members of the Michigan High School Athletic Association.

== Notable alumni ==
- Mary Barra (1980), CEO, General Motors
- Brett Reed (1990), men's basketball head coach, Lehigh University
- Kristopher Pooley (1994), rock musician, music director
- Todd Alsup (1996), pianist, singer-songwriter
- Shannon Osika (born 1993), American middle-distance runner
- Jean (Racine) Prahm (1996), U.S. Olympic bobsledder
- Andy Thorn (2000), former NFL player
- Dylan Larkin (2013), NHL player for the Detroit Red Wings
- Dez Fitzpatrick (2016), NFL player for the Pittsburgh Steelers
- Isaiah Jackson (2020), NBA player for the Indiana Pacers
