= Lake Mohawk (Mississippi) =

- Location within Mississippi Location within the United States
- Location: Prentiss County and Tippah County, Mississippi
- Coordinates: 34°39′12″N 88°43′26″W
- Type: reservoir
- Etymology: Mohawk people
- Basin countries: United States
- Surface elevation: 520 ft (160 m)

Lake Mohawk is a reservoir in the U.S. state of Mississippi.

Lake Mohawk was named after the Mohawk people.
