= Wormer Lake (Waterford Township, Michigan) =

Lake in the state of Michigan, United States

- Location within Michigan Location within the United States
- Location: Oakland County, Michigan
- Coordinates: 42°41′15″N 83°20′38″W
- Type: Lake
- Basin countries: United States
- Surface area: 27.5 acres (11.1 ha)
- Max. depth: 24 ft (7.3 m)
- Surface elevation: 948 ft (289 m)
- Settlements: Waterford Township

Wormer Lake is located in Waterford Township, Michigan. The 27.2-acre (11.0 ha) lake lies north of Walton Blvd. near Clintonville Rd. At its deepest point, the lake is 24 feet (7.3 m) deep.

Wormer Lake connects to Mohawk Lake and to Schoolhouse Lake.

== Fish ==
Fish in Wormer Lake include largemouth basses, bluegills, and yellow perches.
