= Sylvan Lake (Michigan) =

Lake in the state of Michigan, United States

- Location within Michigan Location within the United States
- Location: Oakland County, Michigan
- Coordinates: 42°37′04″N 83°20′15″W
- Type: Lake
- Basin countries: United States
- Surface area: 458 acres (185 ha)
- Max. depth: 71 ft (22 m)
- Surface elevation: 928 ft (283 m)
- Islands: one
- Settlements: Sylvan Lake, Michigan, Keego Harbor, Michigan and Waterford Township

Sylvan Lake is an all-sports, 458-acre (185 ha) Oakland County, Michigan lake along the main branch of the Clinton River.

To the north is 74-acre Otter Lake, which joins the 458-acre (185 ha) Sylvan Lake, for a total of 532 acres (215 ha) of lake, making it the seventh largest lake in Oakland County.

The lake lies in the city of Sylvan Lake, Michigan, in Keego Harbor, Michigan and in Waterford Township, Michigan and is west of Pontiac, Michigan. It is located north of Orchard Lake Road, south of Voorhies Road, east of Cass Lake Road and west of Telegraph Road.

Sylvan Lake connects to 12-acre (4.9 ha) Crystal Lake downstream and to 1,280-acre (520 ha) Cass Lake upstream, although there is a dam between the two lakes at Cass Lake Road.

== Name ==
Sylvan Lake was originally two lakes; Timber Lake to the north and Pickerel Lake to the south. Around the beginning of the 20th century, the names were changed to Sylvan Lake, encompassing the former two lakes into one.

The name Sylvan means "located in the woods".

== Boat club ==
Since 1912, The Oakland County Boat Club has been on Sylvan Lake. The Oakland County Boat Club is a private, not-for-profit, social club and marina.

Fireworks have been a tradition in Sylvan Lake since the late 1940s.

== Fish ==
Fish in Sylvan Lake include black crappie, largemouth bass, northern pike, panfish, rock bass, smallmouth bass and walleye.
