= Mohawk Lake (Waterford Township, Michigan) =

Lake in the state of Michigan, United States

- Location within Michigan
- Location: Oakland County, Michigan
- Coordinates: 42°41′26″N 83°20′20″W
- Type: Lake
- Basin countries: United States
- Surface area: 23 acres (9.3 ha)
- Max. depth: 33 ft (10 m)
- Surface elevation: 948 ft (289 m)
- Settlements: Waterford Township

Mohawk Lake is located in Waterford Township, Michigan. The 23-acre (9.3 ha) lake lies south of Lake Angeus Rd. and north of Walton Blvd. At its deepest point, the lake is 33 feet (10 m) deep.

Mohawk Lake connects to Wormer Lake and to Lake Angelus.

== Fish ==
Mohawk Lake fish include Largemouth Bass, Bluegill and Yellow Perch.
