= Otter Lake (Elcho, Wisconsin) =

Lake in Wisconsin, United States

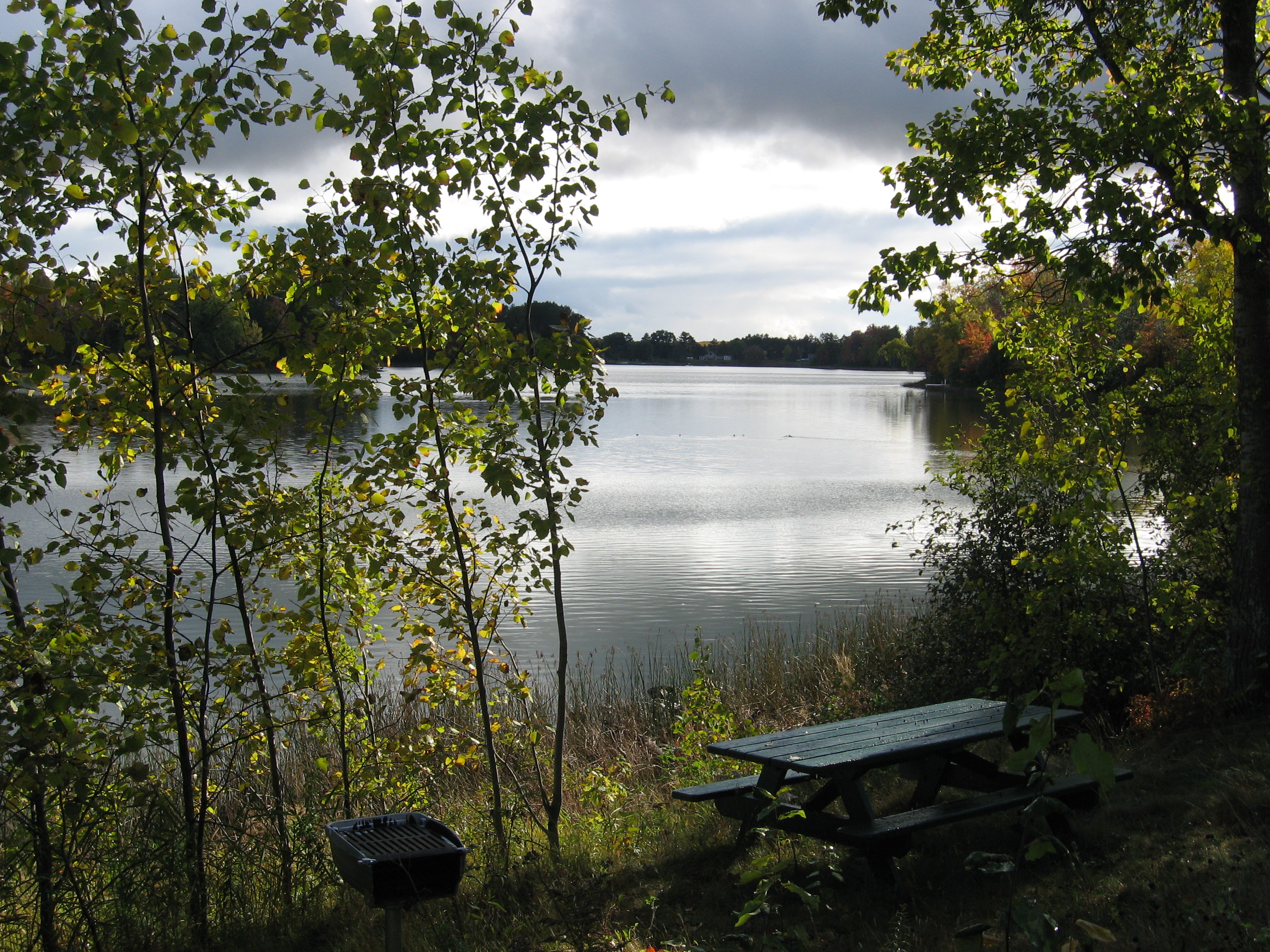
- A picnic area on Otter Lake

- Location within Wisconsin Location within the United States
- Location: Langlade County, Wisconsin
- Coordinates: 45°26′37″N 89°11′11″W
- Primary outflows: Hunting River
- Basin countries: United States
- Surface area: 83 acres (34 ha)
- Max. depth: 27 ft (8.2 m)
- Water volume: 1,223 acre⋅ft (1,509,000 m^{3})
- Shore length^{1}: 30.2 mi (48.6 km)
- Surface elevation: 1,585 ft (483 m)
- Settlements: Elcho, Wisconsin
- ^{1} Shore length is not a well-defined measure.

Otter Lake is a lake in the community of Elcho in Langlade County, Wisconsin, United States. The lake covers an area of 83.3 acres (33.7 ha) and has a maximum depth of 27 feet (8.2 m). The Hunting River flows from the lake. The name is a direct translation of indigenous names for the lake, such as the Menominee name Mekēk-Nepēhsaeh.
