= Lake Oakland (Michigan) =

Lake in Michigan, United States

Oakland Lake
- Location within Michigan Location within the United States
- Location: Oakland County, Michigan
- Coordinates: 42°42′01″N 83°21′28″W
- Type: Lake
- Basin countries: United States
- Surface area: 255 acres (103 ha)
- Max. depth: 64 ft (20 m)
- Surface elevation: 955 ft (291 m)
- Islands: Bird Island
- Settlements: Waterford Township and Independence Township

Oakland Lake is a 255-acre (103 ha) lake located in central Oakland County in both Waterford Township and Independence Township.

There are several basins in the lake, reaching 25 feet (7.6 m), 27 feet (8.2 m), and the deepest being 64 feet (20 m), with all three basins having relatively steep side slopes. There are a number of shallow bays on the lake that are less than five-feet deep and several small islands.

Originally called Pond Lake, Oakland Lake is located on the upper reaches of the Clinton River watershed. The Clinton River enters Oakland Lake on the west end through a short, wide connection to Woodhull Lake immediately upstream.

The Clinton River exits on the southeast end where there are two dams that regulate water level. Both Oakland and Woodhull lakes have a legal established lake level elevation of 957.43. A short distance downstream of Oakland Lake, the Clinton River enters into Schoolhouse Lake and Loon Lake. Near the central portion of Oakland Lake and to the south, a short, shallow connection leads to Leggets Lake, which is a small (25 acres), shallow (10 feet) lake.
