= Scott Lake (Grant County, Minnesota) =

Lake in the state of Minnesota, United States

- Location within Minnesota
- Location: Grant County, Minnesota
- Coordinates: 46°2′59″N 95°58′10″W
- Type: lake

Scott Lake is a lake in Grant County, in the U.S. state of Minnesota.

Scott Lake was named after a local farmer.

== See also ==
- List of lakes in Minnesota
