= Scott Lake (Waterford Township, Michigan) =

Lake in the state of Michigan, United States

Watkins Lake
- Location within Michigan Location within the United States
- Location: Oakland County, Michigan
- Coordinates: 42°40′11″N 83°21′09″W
- Type: Lake
- Basin countries: United States
- Surface area: 77.5 acres (31.4 ha)
- Max. depth: 35 ft (11 m)
- Surface elevation: 948 ft (289 m)
- Settlements: Waterford Township

Scott Lake is a 77.5-acre (31.4 ha) all-sports lake in Waterford Township in Oakland County, Michigan.

The private, 35-foot (11 m) deep lake, all-sports lake is spring fed and is entirely residential. It is located north of Scott Lake Rd. and west of Dixie Highway.

== Namesake ==
Scott Lake was named for Spencer Scott (1792-1872) who, in 1846, settled on the banks of the lake that would bear his family name. Scott came to the lake from his birthplace in Franklin, Sussex Co., New Jersey.

== Fish ==
Fish in Scott Lake include bluegill, walleye, perch and rainbow trout.
