= Watkins Lake (Waterford Township, Michigan) =

Lake in the state of Michigan, United States

- Location within Michigan Location within the United States
- Location: Oakland County, Michigan
- Coordinates: 42°39′53″N 83°22′10″W
- Type: Lake
- Basin countries: United States
- Surface area: 238 acres (96 ha)
- Max. depth: 25 ft (7.6 m)
- Surface elevation: 948 ft (289 m)
- Settlements: Waterford Township

Watkins Lake is a 238 acres (96 ha) lake in Waterford Township in Oakland County, Michigan.

The private, 25 feet (7.6 m) deep all-sports lake is spring fed and is entirely residential. It is located north of Watkins Lake Rd and west of Dixie Highway.

== Namesake ==
Watkins Lake was named for a man named Watkins, who, in 1825, was its first white settler. Mr. Watkins settled in sections 22 and 23 on the south shore of the lake.

== Fish ==
Fish in Watkins Lake include bluegill, walleye, perch and rainbow trout.
