= Otter Lake (Waterford Township, Michigan) =

Lake in the state of Michigan, United States

- Location within Michigan Location within the United States
- Location: Oakland County, Michigan
- Coordinates: 42°37′37″N 83°20′52″W
- Type: Lake
- Basin countries: United States
- Surface area: 74 acres (30 ha)
- Max. depth: 50 ft (15 m)
- Surface elevation: 928 ft (283 m)
- Settlements: Waterford Township

Otter Lake is an all-sports, 74-acre (30 ha) Oakland County, Michigan lake along the main branch of the Clinton River.

To the north, Otter Lake connects to 19-acre (7.7 ha) Geneva Lake.

To the south is 458-acre Sylvan Lake, which joins the 74-acre (30 ha) Otter Lake, for a total of 532 acres (215 ha) of lake, making it the seventh largest lake in Oakland County.

The lake lies in Waterford Township, Michigan and is west of Pontiac, Michigan. It is located south of Voorhies Road, east of Cass Lake Road and west of Telegraph Road.

Otter Lake is named for the North American river otter, which are indigenous to the area.

== Fish ==
Fish in Otter Lake include black crappie, largemouth bass, northern pike, panfish, rock bass, smallmouth bass and walleye.
