= White Horse Lake =

Lake in Oakland County, Michigan, United States

- Location within Michigan
- Location: Oakland County, Michigan
- Coordinates: 42.651208°N 83.410401°W
- Primary inflows: 4
- Basin countries: United States
- Surface area: 8 acres (3.2 ha)
- Max. depth: 10 ft (3.0 m)
- Settlements: Waterford Township

White Horse Lake is a lake located in Waterford Township, Michigan. It lies east of Hospital Rd., north of Elizabeth Lake Rd. and south of Pontiac Lake Rd.

The eight-acre lake is part of the Clinton River.

== Fish ==
White Horse Lake fish include bluegill and panfish.
