= David Grayson =

David Grayson may refer to:

- David Grayson, pseudonym of Ray Stannard Baker
- David Grayson (American football) (born 1964), American football player
- Dave Grayson (1939–2017), American football player
