= Holland Lake (Montana) =

Lake in Montana, United States

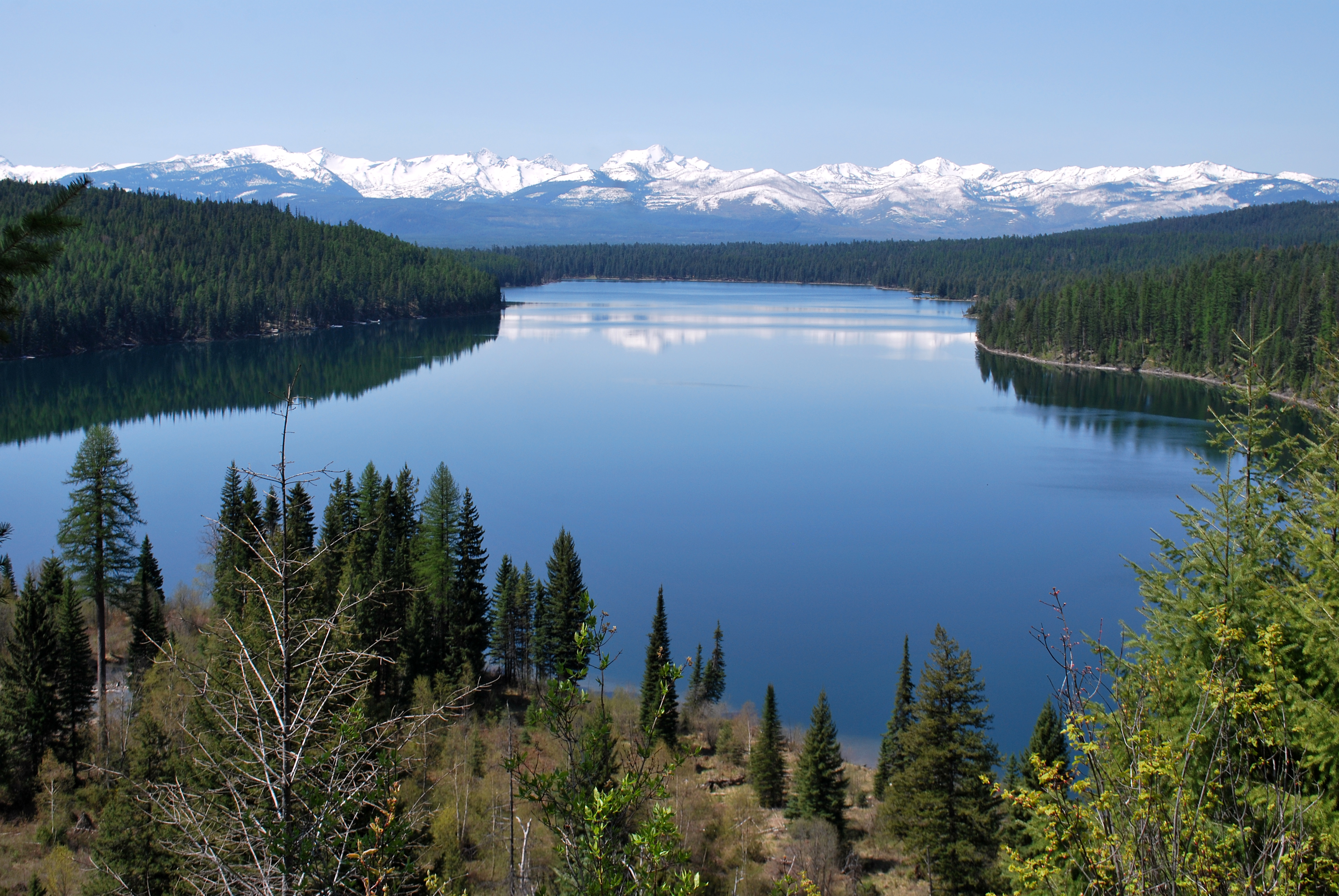
- Holland Lake near Holland Falls

- Location in Montana
- Location: Missoula County, Montana, United States
- Coordinates: 47°26′54″N 113°35′55″W
- Primary inflows: Holland Creek
- Primary outflows: Holland Creek
- Basin countries: United States
- Max. length: 1.75 miles (2.82 km)
- Max. width: 2,500 feet (760 m)
- Surface area: 413.5 acres (167.3 ha)
- Average depth: 59 feet (18 m)
- Max. depth: 156 feet (48 m)
- Water volume: 24,424 acre-feet (30,127,000 m^{3})
- Surface elevation: 4,035 ft (1,230 m)
- Islands: 2

Holland Lake sits at the base of the Swan Range 20 miles (32 km) north of Seeley Lake in Missoula County, Montana. The area is part of Flathead National Forest and offers camping, hiking, swimming, and boating.
