= Waterford Kettering High School =

High school in Michigan, United States

Location
- 2800 Kettering Drive; Waterford, Michigan 48329; United States; 42°40′46″N 83°23′29″W

Information
- Type: Public high school
- Established: 1961
- School district: Waterford School District
- Superintendent: Scott Lindberg
- CEEB code: 231273
- Principal: Ben Harwood
- Teaching staff: 46.40 (on a FTE basis)
- Grades: 9-12
- Enrollment: 902 (2023-2024)
- Student to teacher ratio: 19.44
- Colors: Forest green and white
- Athletics conference: Kensington Lakes Activities Association
- Nickname: Captains
- Rival: Waterford Mott High School
- Newspaper: The Murmur
- Yearbook: Kismet
- Website: waterford.k12.mi.us/schools/hs/kettering/

Student assessments
- 2021–22 school year Change vs. prior year

M-STEP 11th grade proficiency rates (Science / Social Studies)
- Advanced %: 12.0 / 8.3
- Proficient %: 22.6 / 22.2
- PR. Proficient %: 13.4 / 54.2
- Not Proficient %: 52.1 / 15.3

Average test scores
- SAT Total: 926.8 (▼ −2.8)

Waterford Kettering High School is a public high school in the Waterford School District located in Waterford, Michigan. The official name of the high school is Charles F. Kettering High School, named for the automotive industry pioneer.

== History ==
Waterford Kettering High School opened in 1961.

In 1983, the school district consolidated high schools, leading to the closure of Waterford Township High School. This left two high schools in the district: Kettering and Waterford Mott High School.

In the fall of 1990, ninth graders were integrated into the Kettering student body.

== Extracurricular activities ==
=== Athletics ===
Waterford Kettering fields teams in baseball, basketball, bowling, cheerleading, cross country, football, golf, hockey, lacrosse, skiing, soccer, softball, swimming, tennis, track, volleyball, diving, and wrestling. Kettering has won three state championships, two for softball in 1991 and 1998, and one for Men's Bowling in 2018.

=== Music ===
Waterford Kettering has several musical ensembles: three concert bands, two jazz bands, the Marching Captains marching band, Kettering Chorus, Concert Choir, Harmonia (Advanced Select Women), Chamber Choir (Advanced Select), a philharmonic orchestra, a symphony orchestra, and a chamber orchestra. The WK Marching Captains, Wind Ensemble, Chamber and Mass Choir, and orchestras performed at Disney Magic Music Days in 2003, 2007, 2011, 2015 and 2019.

=== Theatre ===
Waterford Kettering's Theatre Department and Drama Club put on several shows each year, including one musical and at least one play.

== Notable alumni ==
- Michael L. Good (1977), dean, University of Florida College of Medicine
- Dave Marsh (1968), music critic
- Jim Miller (1989), former NFL player
- Pat LaFontaine (1983), former NHL player; Member, Hockey Hall of Fame (2003)
- Kirk Gibson (1975), former MLB player; two-time World Series champion (1984, 1988).
- Gail Goestenkors (1981), former head women's basketball coach, University of Texas
- Trevor Scott Strnad (1999), founder and lead singer, The Black Dahlia Murder (band)
- Paul Fry (2010), MLB relief pitcher for Baltimore Orioles.
