= Waterford Township, Michigan =

- Charter township
- Charter Township of Waterford
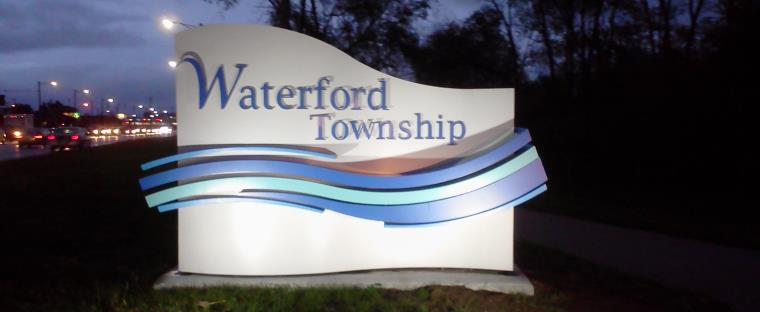
- Welcome sign to Waterford Township

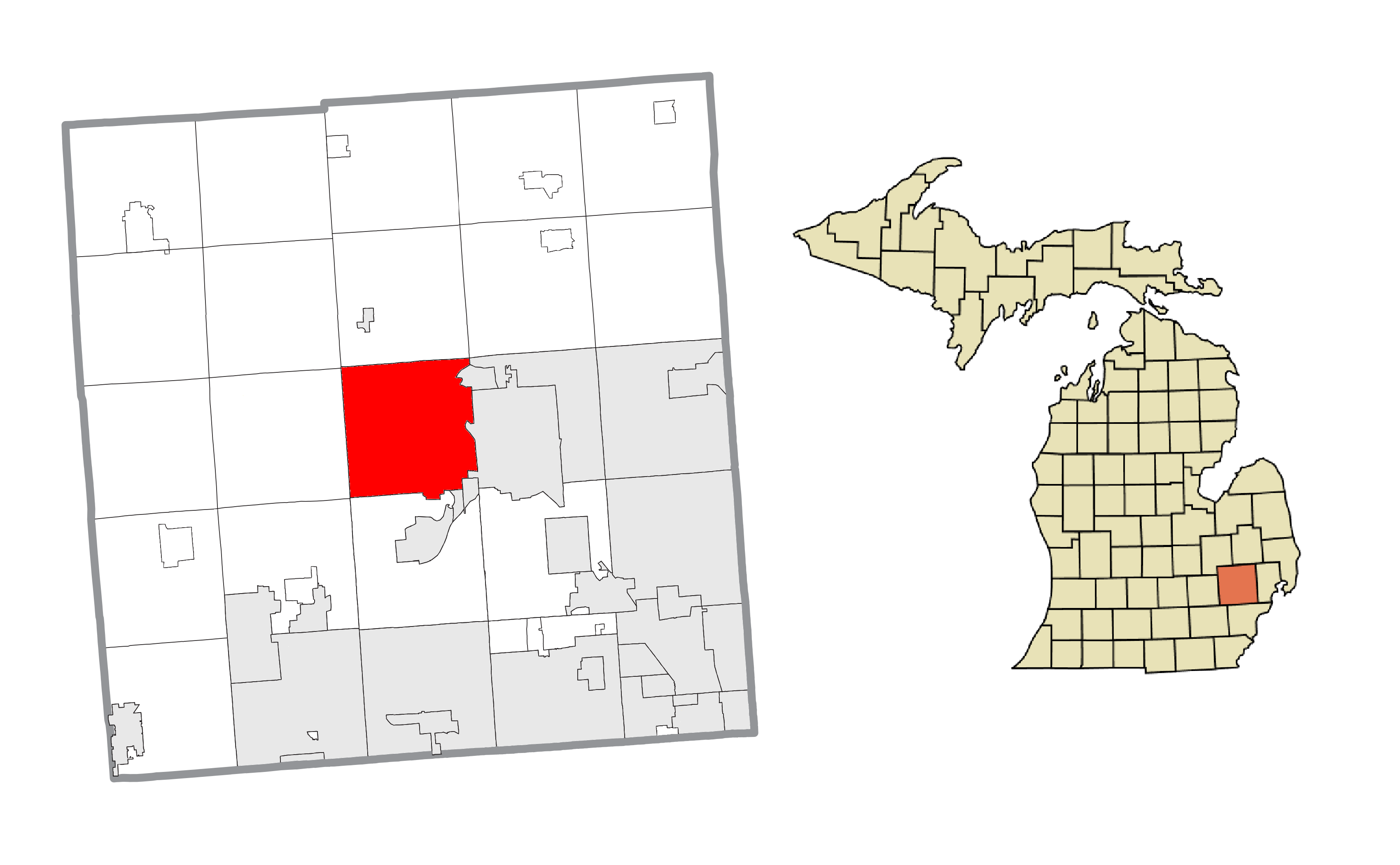
- Location within Oakland County

- Location within the state of Michigan
- Coordinates: 42°39′30″N 83°23′10″W
- Country: United States
- State: Michigan
- County: Oakland
- Established: 1834

Government
  - Supervisor: Anthony M. Bartolotta

Area
  - Charter township: 35.3 sq mi (91.4 km^{2})
  - Land: 31.4 sq mi (81.2 km^{2})
  - Water: 4.0 sq mi (10.3 km^{2}) 11.22%
- Elevation: 948 ft (289 m)

Population (2020)
  - Charter township: 70,067
  - Density: 2,230/sq mi (863/km^{2})
  - Metro: 4,296,250 (Metro Detroit)
- Time zone: UTC-5 (EST)
  - Summer (DST): UTC-4 (EDT)
- ZIP code(s): 48327, 48328, 48329, 48330, 48346, 48387
- Area code: 248
- FIPS code: 26-84240
- GNIS feature ID: 1627218
- Website: waterfordmi.gov

Waterford Township (commonly known simply as Waterford) is a charter township in Oakland County in the U.S. state of Michigan. A northern suburb of Detroit, Waterford is located roughly 30 miles (48.3 km) northwest of downtown Detroit. As of the 2024 census, the township had a population of 70,538.

== Communities ==
Waterford Township has five unincorporated communities:

- Clintonville (42°41′25″N 83°21′22″W) is located on Walton Boulevard between Clintonville Road and Sashabaw Road.
- Drayton Plains (42°41′03″N 83°22′38″W) is located at Dixie Highway on the west end of Loon Lake.
- Elizabeth Lake (42°38′14″N 83°23′18.0″W) is an historic resort community located on Elizabeth Lake.
- Four Towns (42°37′04″N 83°24′49″W) is located at Lochaven Road and Cooley Lake Road.
- Waterford Village (42°42′08″N 83°24′10″W) is an historic village located at Dixie Highway and Andersonville Road.

== History ==
Lewis Cass, the third governor of Michigan Territory, established the boundaries of Oakland County in 1819. Waterford Township was organized in 1834.

In 1818, Oliver Williams selected land in Oakland County that he purchased for two dollars an acre. Archibald Phillips and Alpheus Williams purchased 161.40 acres (653,200 m^{2}) in what would later become known as Waterford Village.

In 1818, Oliver Williams and his family established the first farm settlement in the county on the banks of Silver Lake.

In 1819, Alpheus Williams and Archibald Phillips continued on to where the Clinton River crossed the old Saginaw Trail (now known as Dixie Highway). They settled at the site of the present Waterford Village. Here the first house of Waterford Village was built by Alpheus Williams on the north bank of the river. Archibald Phillips built his home across from the south corner where Andersonville Road meets Dixie Highway.

Williams and Phillips also built the first dam where the Clinton River crossed the Saginaw Trail and erected the first sawmill.

The township was named Waterford because of the vast number of lakes covering the township.

== Geography ==
According to the United States Census Bureau, the township has a total area of 35.3 square miles (91 km^{2}), of which 31.3 square miles (81 km^{2}) is land and 4.0 square miles (10 km^{2}), or 11.22%, is water.

== Government and infrastructure ==
The West Campus of the Oakland County Service Center is located in Waterford Township. This includes the Oakland County Executive Building and Conference Center, and the Oakland County Children's Village, the county's juvenile detention center for children. The Children's Village acts as one of the support sites for the Waterford School District.

=== Federal, state, and county legislators ===
United States House of Representatives
District	Representative	Party	Since
11th	Haley Stevens	Democratic	2019

Michigan Senate
District	Senator	Party	Since
7th	Jeremy Moss	Democratic	2023
23rd	Jim Runestad	Republican	2023

Michigan House of Representatives
District	Representative	Party	Since
52nd	Mike Harris	Republican	2022
53rd	Brenda Carter	Democratic	2023

Oakland County Board of Commissioners
District	Commissioner	Party	Since
8	Karen Joliat	Republican	2021
10	Kristen Nelson	Democratic	2019
12	Christine Long	Republican	2003

== Climate ==
Like the rest of Southeast Michigan, Waterford Township has a continental climate. It has a higher elevation than Detroit (982 feet (299 m) compared to 585 feet (178 m)), and therefore the township is somewhat cooler than Detroit and other nearby cities. It is moderately cold in the winter with varied snowfall throughout. Spring varies from warm by day to cool at night. The township's warmest weather occurs in the summer with temperatures in the eighty to ninety degree range and typically high humidity. Summer is also the wettest season in the area. In recent years, Waterford Township has seen a few 100-plus-degree days. Fall starts warm, but November ends with high temperatures barely above freezing.

== Lakes ==
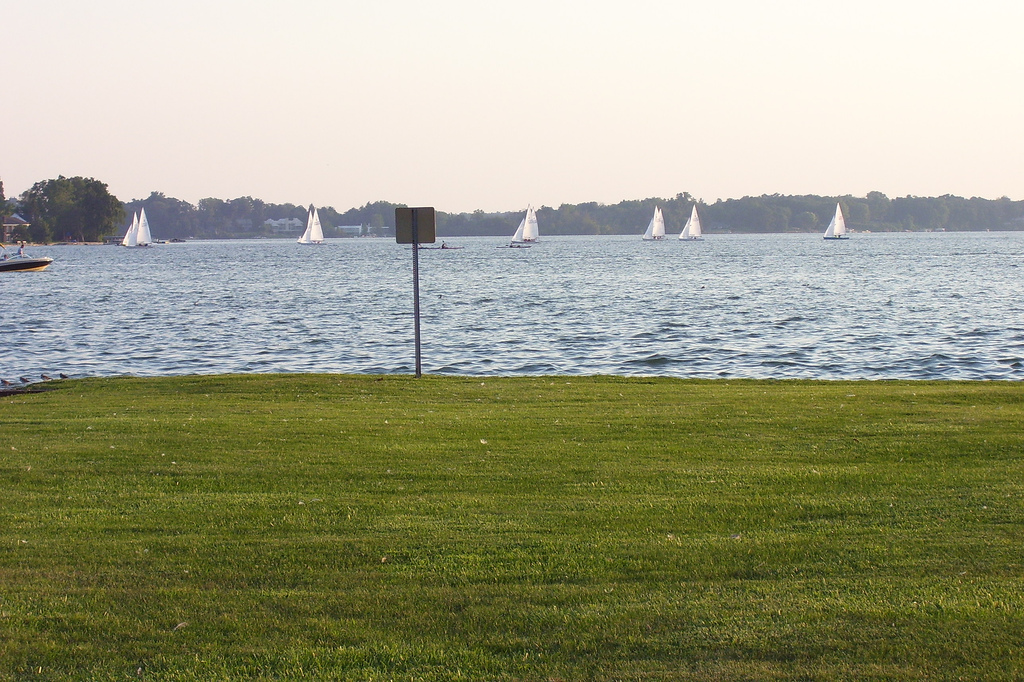
Cass Lake, the largest and deepest lake in Waterford Township

Waterford Township is home to 34 named lakes.

Lakes in Waterford Township
Lake	Size in acres	Depth in feet
Baldwin Lake	9	10
Cass Lake (part)	1,280	123
Clam Lake	21	10
Crescent Lake	90	40
Eagle Lake	19	20
Elizabeth Lake	363	72
Fiddle Lake	9	10
Geneva Lake	19	35
Huntoon Lake	42.5	15
Lake Angelus (part)	477	88
Lake Oakland (most)	255	64
Lake Goodrich	4	10
Leggets Lake	25	10
Lester Lake (most)	12	25
Loon Lake	243	73
Lotus Lake (most)	179	65
Maceday Lake	234	117
Mohawk Lake	23	33
Morgan Lake	28	25
Otter Lake	74	50
Pleasant Lake	92	52
Pontiac Lake (part)	612	34
Rainbow Lake	5	15
Schoolhouse Lake	37	49
Scott Lake	77.5	35
Silver Lake	101	73
Sylvan Lake (part)	532	71
Upper Silver Lake (part)	35.5	30
Van Norman Lake (part)	66	90
Watkins Lake	238	25
White Horse Lake	8	10
Williams Lake	155	45
Woodhull Lake (most)	135	56
Wormer Lake	27.5	24

== Demographics ==
According to the 2020 U.S. Census, Waterford Township had a population of 70,565.

=== 2020 Census ===
According to the 2020 U.S. Census, the racial makeup of the township was:

- 85.2% White alone
- 5.7% Black or African American alone
- 0.5% American Indian and Alaska native alone
- 2.1% Asian alone
- 0.1% Native Hawaiian or Pacific Islander alone
- 4.9% Two or More Races alone
- 7.0% Hispanic or Latino
- 81.4% White alone, not Hispanic or Latino

=== 2010 Census ===
According to the 2010 Census the racial and ethnic makeup of Waterford's population was 83.7% non-Hispanic White, and 4.8% African-American, 0.4% Native American, 1.9% Asian and 6.6% Hispanic.

=== 2000 Census ===
According to the 2000 U.S. Census, there were 73,150 people, 29,387 households, and 19,130 families residing in the township in 2000. The population density was 2,334.3 inhabitants per square mile (901.3/km^{2}).

In 2000, there were 30,404 housing units, with an average density of 970.2 per square mile (374.6/km^{2}).

The racial makeup of the township in 2000 was:

- 92.65% White
- 3.91% Hispanic or Latino
- 2.89% African American
- 0.35% Native American
- 1.27% Asian
- 0.01% Pacific Islander
- 1.13% from other races
- 1.69% from two or more races

In 2000, there were:

- 29,387 households
- 30.4% of the households had children under the age of 18 living with them
- 51.6% were married couples living together
- 9.6% had a female householder with no husband present
- 34.9% were non-families
- 27.9% of all households were made up of individuals
- 8.1% had someone living alone who was 65 years of age or older
- 2.42 was the average household size
- 2.99 was the average family size.

The township's 2000 population was:

- 23.2% under the age of 18
- 8.2% from 18 to 24
- 36.0% from 25 to 44
- 21.8% from 45 to 64
- 10.8% who were 65 years of age or older
- The median age was 36 years
- For every 100 females, there were 99.6 males
- For every 100 females age 18 and over there were 97.5 males

The median income for a household in 2000 in the township was $55,008, and the median income for a family was $64,500. Males had a median income of $47,409 versus $32,016 for females. The per capita income for the township was $27,432. About 3.8% of families and 5.1% of the population were below the poverty line, including 5.8% of those under age 18 and 4.0% of those age 65 and over.

== Transportation ==
Oakland County International Airport is located in Waterford Township. The airport is a hub for the airline Lakeshore Express, a local commuter airline to Pellston, and Chicago-Midway

== Railroad ==
In 1851, the Detroit, Grand Haven and Milwaukee Railway came through Waterford Township and three train depots were built in Waterford Township; the Drayton Plains depot (at Hatchery Rd.), the Waterford depot (at Airport Rd.) and the Windiate depot (at Windiate Rd.) . The railroad helped make the many lakes of the Waterford area easily accessible to summer vacationers from the big cities and served to make Waterford Township a summer resort area.

In 1882, the Detroit, Grand Haven and Milwaukee Railway was purchased by the Grand Trunk Western Railroad.

Grand Trunk Western

As roads were improved, people began driving to their summer resort area and the passenger depots were closed in the late 1950s.

The Windiate Park Hotel was a summer resort for vacationers from Detroit and Lansing. The resort was easily accessed by four trains a day during the summer months from the 1890s to the 1940s and was located on Lotus Lake, near the Windiate depot. The resort featured boating, fishing, sailing, sunbathing, tennis and a dance hall. The resort was owned by J.D. and M.L. Rice.

Another popular summer resort was the Waterford Hotel in the village of Waterford. The hotel was sold to William Bradt, who changed its name to Bradt's Exchange. The hotel was also named the Waterford Exchange, and served as a stagecoach stop for over 60 years.

Canadian National Railway

Today, the railroad is owned by Canadian National Railway (CN) and passenger service is no longer offered, giving way to freight only.

There are seven railroad crossings in Waterford Township and one railroad bridge.

== Education ==
=== Public schools ===
The Waterford School District operates public schools in most of Waterford Township (the Pontiac School District serves a small portion of the township).

In 1961, Kettering High School opened and Mott High School opened in 1969. Kettering's address is now 2800 Kettering Drive in Waterford. In 2012, Durant High School, an alternative school, opened in the township at 501 N. Cass Lake Road in Waterford. All three Waterford Township public high schools were named after automobile industry pioneers; William C. Durant, Charles F. Kettering, and Charles S. Mott. Waterford Township High School was located in Waterford Township, Michigan at the corner of Highland Rd. and Crescent Lake Rd. It was closed as a high school in 1983, but the Board of Education continued to use the building for several years for various purposes. (Waterford Township: Year Opened: 1947, Year Closed: 1983).

In 1957, John D. Pierce Junior High School opened at 5145 Hatchery Road in Waterford, and Stevens T. Mason Junior High School was opened in 1965 at 3835 West Walton Blvd. in Waterford. Both junior high schools originally included grades 7 through 9. Today, both Pierce and Mason are middle schools, which include grades 6 through 8.

As of the 2015–16 school year, the Waterford School District has nine public elementary schools located within the township; William Beaumont Elementary School, Thomas M. Cooley Elementary School, Donelson Hills Elementary School, David Grayson Elementary School, Laura S. Haviland Elementary School, Douglass Houghton Elementary School, William S. Knudsen Elementary School, Riverside Elementary School, and Henry R. Schoolcraft Elementary School.

=== Private schools ===
Opened in 1960, Our Lady of the Lakes School is a private Catholic K-12 school also located in the township at 5495 Dixie Highway, just south of Waterford Village.

St. Benedict School in Waterford was in operation until circa 2003, when the campus became the lower (elementary school) of Notre Dame Preparatory School and Marist Academy; this occurred in a time when other Catholic elementary schools in the area closed. The lower school moved to the common Pontiac campus in 2013.

=== Community College ===
Waterford Township is home to the Oakland Community College Highland Lakes Campus. The campus, which opened in 1965, is located at 7350 Cooley Lake Road in Waterford.

Oakland Schools, the intermediate school district serving Oakland County, has its offices in Waterford Township.

== Public library ==
The Waterford Township Public Library serves the residents of the township. It is located at 5168 Civic Center Drive, off of Crescent Lake Road near Hatchery Road in Waterford.

== Public safety ==
Waterford Township maintains its own police and fire departments.

The Waterford Police Department was founded in 1953. Frank VanAtta was appointed the first Waterford Chief of Police, earning a yearly salary of $5,500. William Stokes was a long-time chief who had some 30 years of service before retiring in 1985. He was followed by Robert (Duke) Reynolds, who graduated the FBI National Academy, and then Gary Root, Paul Valad, John Dean and Daniel McCaw. The current chief, Scott Underwood, retired as a Captain at the Warren Police Department.

The police station is located at 5150 Civic Center Drive in Waterford near the Waterford Township Hall and the 51st District Court in the Waterford Civic Center Complex. The police department was drastically cut in 2010 due to the falling economy and the closing of 2 of the largest commercial tax sources- The Summit Place Mall and a General Motors facility. The department went from over 100 sworn police officers to 55 which was similar to the number of officers in the 1970s. A recent tax increase voted on by the residents is supposed to add 9 more officers. Waterford still remains one of the largest physical and populated areas in Oakland County but remains on the bottom of police officers per population. The department has a current force of roughly 25 patrol officers for the population of over 70,000 residents. The Waterford Regional Fire Department employs 144. It is currently the 4th largest Fire Department in the State of Michigan. Waterford Township also provides Fire, EMS, and Dispatch services to the neighboring City of Pontiac and City of Lake Angelus.

== Notable people ==
- Todd Alsup, pianist, singer-songwriter
- Tim Robinson, comedian, actor, writer and producer
- Mary Barra, CEO, General Motors
- Paul Fry, baseball player for the Baltimore Orioles
- Pat LaFontaine, former NHL player, 2003 Hockey Hall of Fame inductee
- Kirk Gibson, former MLB player
- Gail Goestenkors, former women's basketball head coach, University of Texas
- Michael L. Good, dean, University of Florida College of Medicine
- Dylan Larkin, NHL player
- Dave Marsh, music critic
- Jim Miller, former NFL player
- Paul Mitchell, Member of the United States House of Representatives
- Kristopher Pooley, rock musician and musical director
- Jean (Racine) Prahm, U.S. Olympian bobsledder
- Brett Reed, men's basketball head coach, Lehigh University
- Amber Slagle, racing driver
- Trevor Strnad, lead singer, The Black Dahlia Murder
