= West Bloomfield Township Public Library =

Library in West Bloomfield, Michigan, USA

Coordinates: 42°33′36.0″N 83°22′29.1″W

- Location: West Bloomfield Township, MI, United States
- Established: 1934; 92 years ago

Other information
- Website: westbloomfieldlibrary.org

The West Bloomfield Township Public Library is located in West Bloomfield, Michigan, 20 miles (32 km) northwest of Detroit. The library system consists of the Main Branch and the Westacres Branch and serves the communities of West Bloomfield Township, and the cities of Keego Harbor, Orchard Lake and Sylvan Lake. West Bloomfield was ranked on Hennen’s American Public Library Ratings Index of top public libraries in 2005 and 2008 and has overall 150 employees. The West Bloomfield Township Public Library has been named one of 10 recipients of the 2010 National Medal for Museum and Library Service, the United States of America's highest honor for museums and libraries. The annual award, made by the Institute of Museum and Library Services (IMLS) since 1994, recognizes institutions (5 libraries and 5 museums) for outstanding social, educational, environmental, or economic contributions to their communities.

== History ==
=== Main library ===
==== Early years ====
The library system of West Bloomfield has grown as the community has grown. A library was first formed in West Bloomfield in 1934, when 38 members of the Keego-Cass Women’s Club gathered books and placed them in a room in their clubhouse. From 1939 to 1947, the library was located in the balcony and then the basement of Town Hall. When the library outgrew the Town Hall spaces, it re-located to a room in the Keego Harbor Community Center.

The West Bloomfield School System purchased the community center in 1950 and allowed the library to stay for free. When the school system vacated the building in 1954, the library was allowed to stay, but once again, by 1957 the library needed more space and moved to Keego Harbor Standard School Building.

==== Orchard Lake Rd. location ====
When Keego Harbor became a city in 1955 and the library needed additional space, it was decided that a library needed to be built in West Bloomfield. In 1963, a 5,863 ft^{2} (544.7 m^{2}) library opened on Orchard Lake Road. This facility contained enough space for 50,000 books and a meeting room.

==== Walnut Lake location ====
In 1984, a new Main Library location was constructed adjacent to Walnut Lake Rd. next to the West Bloomfield Town Hall and Police Station. The new location offered more space, 16,000 ft^{2} (1,500 m^{2}), which increased to 25,000 square feet in 1988 during the second phase of the project. The library’s collection at this point was approximately 90,000 books and 75,000 non-book items. In 1994, the library began offering the Internet to patrons in the library as well as dial-up service to patrons at home, offering classes to patrons in order to familiarize them with the service.

With the growing popularity of the Internet and a community desire for increased resources, a library millage was placed on the ballot and was passed in September 1997 to renovate and expand both branches. Construction on the Main Library began in the fall of 1998, and the library reopened on May 21, 2000. Some of the features of the new building were an expanded youth area, a youth activity center, meeting room, a dedicated computer lab, conference room, individual and group study rooms, 90 computers throughout the building, a magazine area with fireplace, reading terrace, and added shelving for the growing collection.

=== Westacres Branch ===
The Westacres Branch of the West Bloomfield Township Public Library is located in the Westacres subdivision in the northwest part of the township. The first library in the Westacres area began in 1938, when members of the Westacres Reading Club gathered books and set up a library in the upper floor of a clubhouse located in the community. In 1940, due to the popularity of the library, the township took over management and funding, and usage continued to rise. This prompted the township to purchase, renovate and move the library to the former Westacres co-op building on February 8, 1966. This 2,100 ft^{2} (200 m^{2}) location served the community until remodeling was once again needed to meet community demand.

In 1985, the Westacres Branch was increased to approximately 6,000 ft^{2} (560 m^{2}). This new facility featured an activity room for children, videocassettes for circulation, and once the Internet became an essential resource for libraries to offer, Internet computers were installed.

As part of the millage approved in September 1997, the Westacres Branch was also renovated. Renovation and expansion of the Westacres Branch began in the spring of 2000. The building was increased in size to 11,700 ft^{2} (1,090 m^{2}) Some of the features added to this new facility were an enlarged youth room, a youth activity center, 20 computers, 13 stand-up library catalog stations spread throughout the building, a reading terrace, comfortable seating, a fireplace in the magazine area and increased shelving for more materials.
