= The Jean and Samuel Frankel Jewish Academy of Metropolitan Detroit =

Jewish high school in metro Detroit

Jean and Samuel Frankel Jewish Academy of Metropolitan Detroit

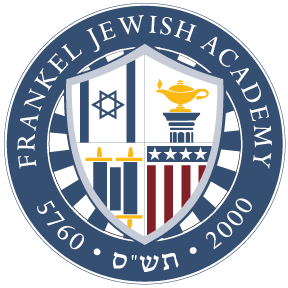

Location
- 6600 West Maple Rd. West Bloomfield, Michigan 48322; USA
- 42°32′38″N 83°24′07″W

Information
- Other names: Frankel Jewish Academy; FJA
- Former names: The Jewish Academy of Metropolitan Detroit; JAMD
- Type: Independent Jewish day school
- Religious affiliation: Jewish
- Denomination: Non-denominational
- Established: 28 August 2000
- CEEB code: 233729
- NCES School ID: A0301852
- President: Mark Weinbaum
- Head of school: Rabbi Azaryah Cohen
- Grades: 9 – 12
- Gender: Coed
- Enrollment: 117 (2025-2026)
- Student to teacher ratio: 5.2:1 (2017-2018)
- Colors: Cyan and maroon
- Athletics conference: MHSAA and CHSL
- Mascot: Jaguar
- Team name: FJA Jaguars
- Accreditation: NAIS via ISACS
- Tuition: $27,300 + $1,300 material fee (2021-2022)
- Feeder schools: Hillel Day School
- Website: frankelja.org

Frankel Jewish Academy (FJA), named after its major benefactors Jean and Samuel Frankel, is a college-preparatory independent Jewish day school in West Bloomfield, a city in the Detroit metropolitan area. Opened in 2000 primarily for providing continuity of Jewish education for the graduates of Hillel Day School, a local Conservative K – 8 school, it became the first multi-denominational Jewish high school in Michigan. It provides both secular and Judaic studies instruction for ninth through 12th grade students coming from various denominations within Judaism, including Reform, Conservative, and Orthodox.

== History ==
=== Founding ===
From c.1996 a group of Hillel Day School parents led by Jeff Garden pitched to the local community leaders the idea of starting a new Jewish high school. Eventually they earned support from the Jewish Federation of Metropolitan Detroit. In April 1999, Rabbi Lee Buckman of Congregation Beth Israel (Milwaukee) was named the future school's headmaster. In January 2000 the Jewish Academy of Metropolitan Detroit (JAMD) held an open house, helped by guests from Boston's New Jewish High School. By that time the academy had already identified department heads of social sciences, mathematics, science, performing arts, Hebrew, and Jewish studies, and selected the leads of professional development, recruitment, and academic affairs. The school was set to open with ninth and 10th grades to start, tuition for a year would be $10,000, and every family whose child was accepted would receive a $2,000 subsidy. The school opened on August 28, 2000, at the lower level of the Jewish Community Center building in West Bloomfield.

Gabriella Burman of The Forward noted on the occasion of JAMD opening that it was part of a national explosion of new non-Orthodox high schools: from 30 to 45 within three years, with 12 of the 15 new schools being community, or non-denominational, schools. She added that "the boom in Jewish high school education outside of the yeshiva world, where high schooling has been standard practice for much of the last generation, is further proof of the triumph of day schooling as a communal response to rising intermarriage rates and a perceived decline in Jewish affiliation."

=== Frankel gift ===
In 2002, JAMD received a $20 million endowment, the largest endowment ever received by a Jewish high school. The donor, who requested anonymity, set only one stipulation — that the funds not be used for construction. In 2003, Jean and Samuel Frankel were revealed as contributors of this gift, made in the form of a 2-1 challenge fund: to receive the full $20 million, JAMD and the Jewish Federation must raise $10 million. Jean Frankel and her husband, longtime Detroit-area real estate developer Samuel, had a long and distinguished history of involvement with and giving to the local university, cultural organizations, hospitals, and Jewish schools. Soon after, the JAMD was renamed The Jean and Samuel Frankel Jewish Academy of Metropolitan Detroit (FJA).

=== Campus ===
When the academy opened in 2000 with 51 ninth and 10th grade students, classes were held in the basement of the Jewish Community Center in West Bloomfield. In 2001, students moved to modular classrooms. In 2007 the school, having grown to 81 faculty and staff and more than 220 students, moved to a newly constructed facility on the third floor of the Jewish Community Center. Thanks to an $8.5-million campaign, the 50,000-square-foot facility has 27 classrooms, a fully equipped science suite that includes four classrooms and two labs, and an 1,800-square-foot Beit Midrash/Chapel, which houses the academy's Judaica library collection. There is also a performing arts studio, several student lounges and a media center.

In 2019, FJA signed a 10-year lease to remain at the JCC, received a 17,000-square-foot expansion in the JCC's lower level and started converting the 4,550-square-foot-space of the Aaron DeRoy Theatre into a black-box theater to enhance its performing arts offerings. The students use the JCC's café, lounge area, pool, gyms, soccer fields, art studios and other JCC amenities.

=== Controversy around hiring policies and governance ===
FJA went into 2008-2009 year under a new headmaster, Rabbi Eric Grossman. The academy, founded on the premise of welcoming students from all Jewish denominations, had a large body of Reform and non-affiliated students. However, the school's elected board had few Reform representatives, and the school's Judaic department's hiring policies remained biased against Reform rabbis (the policy required all who teach Judaic studies courses or lead minyans to be shomer Shabbat, i.e. Shabbat observant). Some students felt that the school was not offering an "open" attitude toward liberal Judaism. The disagreements had been brewing for several years and finally became public, as a fresh incident involving a "Denominational Differences" class at FJA pushed things to the forefront. In August 2011 a group of Reform rabbis wrote a formal letter to FJA complaining at a "marked lack of denominational sensitivity". In response, the FJA board at its November 2011 meeting passed a resolution "reaffirming its support of our school's mission, philosophy, head of school and hiring practices". The conflict kept steaming.

In 2012 FJA changed its governance from the original membership model, in which parent members elected the board, to a directorship model (self-perpetuating board) in which current board members select their own replacements. This model was popular among independent schools: the neighboring Hillel Day School had the same directorship model since 2009. However, a group of FJA parents felt violated by perceived lack of transparency and in 2013 filed a legal complaint against the FJA board in Oakland County Circuit Court. FJA board president Bill Newman maintained that "the process we conducted was equitable, legal and binding". A few months later, parents dismissed their complaint.

=== Recent years ===
In 2015 FJA received a new head of school Rabbi Azaryah Cohen who improved the school's outreach to Reform rabbis and launched a STEM lab.

In 2020, FJA was impacted by the COVID-19 pandemic. On Governor's orders, all Michigan schools closed in March and went online. However, recognizing the limitations of virtual learning, FJA started the 2020–2021 academic year returning to on-campus, in-person instruction with stringent health safeguards. Remote, synchronous classes were made available online for students who preferred not to be physically present.

== Academics ==
FJA offers a strong college-preparatory dual curriculum in secular and Judaic studies. Researchers at Niche.com repeatedly ranked FJA one of the best private high schools in Michigan: #5 in 2017 and #6 in 2020.

The school utilizes modern technologies; for example, in 2011 it gave iPad 2s to all its students. FJA has the Genesis S.T.E.M. Lab that "bring[s] study of science, technology, engineering and math into the 21st century". In 2018 Frankel robotics team represented U.S. in Israel at international competition, and in 2019 received first place for its 3D CAD design of a fuel injector.

The school's business elective course produced a few entrepreneurs. In 2012, juniors Matthew Tukel and Sawyer Altman started their own energy drink business 313Energy. In 2015, junior Max Feber developed a cold coffee brewing apparatus BRUW and raised more than $10,000 from more than 180 backers on Kickstarter for its production. Eventually, he landed a deal with Mark Cuban on Shark Tank.

In 2019 the school changed its schedule with a later start time, with school days running now from 8:30 AM to 3:15 PM. Starting one hour later helps the physical and mental well-being of teens, who were often too sleepy to be focused for early-morning classes.

As part of its mission, FJA inspires students to dedicate themselves to Jewish tradition, peoplehood, and the State of Israel. The senior-year Israel trip is now part of the curriculum.

In 2019 the school created the Frankel Merit Scholars Program, a four-year, merit-based $20,000 per year scholarship for up to 15 new students. At that time, tuition was $25,000 per year. To increase enrollment, in 2022 FJA introduced the Shorashim Grants where current and incoming families, regardless of the ability to pay, can choose up to $10,000 per student annually.

== Extracurriculars ==
=== Performing arts ===
FJA has an active theater program that produces up to two productions per year under direction of Mitch Master, the school's founding director of fine and performing arts. Occasionally, the school invites younger local actors for its bigger productions, such as Munchkins and Flying Monkeys for 2004 production of The Wizard of Oz or orphans and Fagin's gang of thieves for 2012 production of Oliver!.

=== Sports ===
The school's mascot is the Jaguar. The FJA Jaguars (or, Jags for short) participate in interscholastic sports, competing in the Catholic League division. The school doesn't play from sundown Friday to sunset Saturday because of the Jewish Sabbath. In 2005, the school sued the Michigan High School Athletic Association (MHSAA) that discriminated against it by scheduling tournament games on Saturdays. In 2009, FJA won the ruling in the state appeals court. In 2021, FJA junior Merrick Michaelson who qualified for state meet was given an accommodation by MHSAA: he ran the challenging Michigan International Speedway cross country course all by himself on Friday, one day before the actual state meet Saturday. Running solo was something that had never been done in the nearly 100-year history of the cross country state meet.

== Heads of school ==
Rabbi Lee Buckman (1999–2008). Rabbi Buckman, 37, from Conservative Congregation Beth Israel in Milwaukee, was recruited as the future school's founding head in April 1999, having been chosen from about 80 applicants for this position. He built a group of administrators and faculty that shared his passion for the school and opened it in 2000. During his nine-year tenure, the school grew from 51 students to 223. "It is very difficult to make all Jews happy, but Rabbi Buckman was able to walk that line," said Debbie Wrotslaysky, FJA mathematics department head. "He did an unbelievable job in keeping all of his constituents happy." Rabbi Buckman served the FJA until 2008. In 2009 he departed Michigan to begin his post as head of school at the Katherine and Jacob Greenfield Hebrew Academy in Atlanta, leaving behind "a joyous legacy of learning".

Rabbi Eric Grossman (2008–2015). Rabbi Grossman became the head of school for the FJA in 2008, after serving seven years as founding head of its Bible department. His tenure as FJA's head of school was tainted by school's prolonged standoff with the local Reform rabbis over FJA hiring policies. Rabbi Grossman left FJA in 2015 to become head of school at Manhattan's Ramaz School; at his departure, FJA had 225 students.

Rabbi Azaryah Cohen (2015–present). Rabbi Cohen became the head of school in 2015, after several years of serving as its Judaic studies principal and Talmud teacher. In 2017 he was lauded for improving the school's outreach to Reform rabbis.

== Notable alumni ==
- Noah Arbit (class of 2013), politician, member of the Michigan House of Representatives
- Max Feber (class of 2017), entrepreneur, developed a cold coffee brewing device BRUW while in high school and eventually sold a share of his company to Mark Cuban on Shark Tank.

== See also ==
- History of the Jewish people in Detroit
