= Hillel Day School =

Jewish day school in metro Detroit

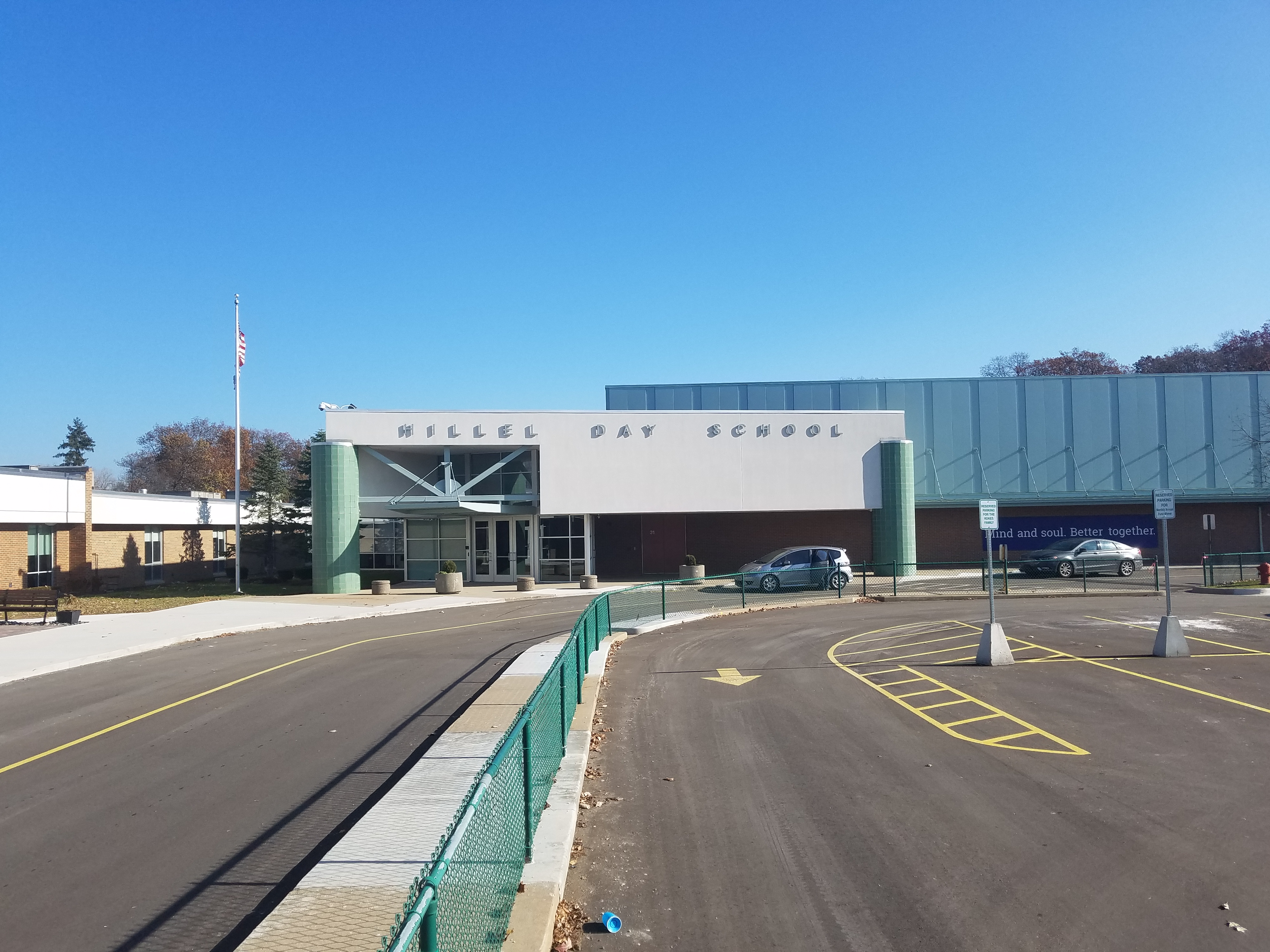

Location
- 32200 Middlebelt Road; Farmington Hills, Michigan 48334; United States
- 42°31′24″N 83°20′23″W

Information
- Other names: Hillel Day School of Metropolitan Detroit, Hillel
- Type: Independent Jewish day school
- Motto: ″Mind and soul. Better together.″
- Religious affiliation: Jewish
- Denomination: Non-denominational
- Established: 1958
- Founder: Rabbi Jacob Segal
- NCES School ID: 00641984
- Head of school: Dr. Darin S. Katz
- Grades: Pre-K – 8
- Gender: Coed
- Enrollment: 562 (2021–2022)
- Campus size: 11 acres
- Campus type: Suburban
- Mascot: Hawk
- Team name: Hillel Hawks
- Accreditations: NAIS via ISACS
- Website: hillelday.org
- Last updated: 17 December 2023

Hillel Day School, named after the Jewish religious leader, sage and scholar Hillel, is an independent Pre-K – 8 Jewish day school in Farmington Hills, Michigan, a city in the Detroit metropolitan area. Founded in 1958, it became the first non-Orthodox Jewish school in Michigan. It provides both secular and Judaic studies instruction for students from preschool through eighth grade.

Hillel initially rented space from various Jewish organizations. In 1970, it settled into its permanent home in Farmington Hills. In 1980s–1990s, portable classrooms were necessary due to overcrowding. Since then, Hillel's campus has undergone significant expansions and renovations. It now features open-space learning areas, a separate pre-school wing, an indoor gym, all-season outdoor athletic facilities, an "innovation hub" with a greenhouse and makerspace, and a café with a kitchen.

In 2005, Hillel controversially closed the teachers' union. In 2008, Hillel ended its affiliation with the Conservative movement and became a non-denominational Jewish day school.

== School history ==
=== Founding and early years ===
The Hillel Day School was established in the fall of 1958, after a long period of planning, by a group of Detroit educators, Rabbis and leaders of the community. The group was spearheaded by Rabbi Jacob Segal, who was consequently recognized as the founder of the school and its honorary life president.

The school began with 29 students in the kindergarten and first grade, a further grade being added each following year. By 1960 it grew into a modern elementary day school with 51 students in grades K–3 that offered a blend of Hebraic-religious and general studies, influenced by Conservative Judaism and Zionism. By 1963, enrollment was 115 students in grades K–6. By 1966, Hillel grew up into a K–9 school and, in 1967, held the commencement exercises for its first graduating ninth grade. The next year's graduates were the first students that completed ten years of education at Hillel, from kindergarten at school's founding in 1958 to ninth grade.

=== Growth (1970s–1990s) ===
In 1970 Hillel moved to its current home in Farmington Hills. The school rapidly grew: the total enrollment went from 270 in 1970 to 533 in 1989 to 636 in 1992 (at those enrollment level, the school had to use portable classrooms) and to 712 in 1997. The school's growth was partially due to the inflow of Jewish immigrants from the Soviet Union: in 1979, Hillel had 20, and in 1992, 49 Russian students.

Hillel was recognized at the time as "a crown jewel of Conservative Judaism in Detroit" because it offered Jewish education "in a form more palatable to some for whom the Beth Yehuda seemed too oldworld". However, it was only in 1979 that Hillel formally affiliated with the Schechter Day School Network of schools that identify with Conservative Judaism.

Hillel went on as a K–9 school for 22 years from 1968 until 1988. Sometime around 1980 the ninth grade became the entry point for local public high schools, and enrollment to Hillel's ninth grade dropped. In 1988, Hillel Day School held graduation exercises for its last graduating ninth grade class. Since then, Hillel continued as a K–8 school.

=== Teachers' union closure (2005) ===
In 2005, Hillel Day School closed its teachers’ union after a Michigan Court of Appeals ruling prevented union organizers at a Roman Catholic Brother Rice High School from joining the Michigan Education Association. Both schools (and many more religious schools across the country) used the same precedent to de-unionize their teachers: the National Labor Relations Board v. Catholic Bishop of Chicago case that went before the U.S. Supreme Court in 1979. In that case, the court ruled that the lay teachers at religious schools are exempt from the federal collective bargaining agreement.

At the time, Hillel Day School belonged to Schechter Day School Network of Jewish day schools that identify with Conservative Judaism. Many conservative rabbis criticized Hillel for ending recognition of its teachers’ union for collective bargaining. Among them was Rabbi David Nelson, religious leader of the Conservative synagogue Congregation Beth Shalom in Oak Park, Michigan, who said if "you understand Jewish law, you have to have sensitivity toward the working person". Rabbi Jill Jacobs defended the rights of workers to unionize and authored conservative movement's top lawmaking body 2008 teshuvah, or religious legal ruling, dealing with unionization and other related employment issues.

=== 2000s and beyond ===
In 2000s Hillel's enrollment tapered, from more than 760 in 2001 to 596 in 2005. The school reacted to this with some major changes. In 2008, Hillel broke off the Schechter network and reestablished itself as a community (or, non-denominational) RAVSAK Jewish day school to better attract Reform and non-religious Jewish families. In 2009, Hillel changed its governance from the original "membership model", in which parent members elected the board, to a directorship model (self-perpetuating board), in which current board members select their own replacements. Then, in 2010, Hillel launched its Early Childhood Center, opening the doors to 69 pre-K students.

In 2013, Hillel's ECC became the first licensed center in the Farmington or West Bloomfield area to receive a rating under Michigan's "Great Start to Quality" program, which evaluates state preschools. In 2019, the school expanded its ECC facility and started the year with 173 pre-K students. However, while the ECC grew, the school's K–8 population in 2010s was still on the decline: from 550 students in 2010 to 441 in 2017.

2014–2017 marked major upgrades to Hillel's physical facilities, just in time for a series of 2017–2018 alumni and community events in celebration of its 60-year anniversary.

In 2020, Hillel was impacted by the COVID-19 pandemic. In March, the school closed due to a teacher testing positive for COVID-19, one of the state's first 12 cases of the outbreak. Soon after, another teacher, coach Tony Sanders, died from COVID-19 complications. The school shifted to remote learning. Before their virtual graduation, the eighth graders had a "trip down Memory Lane" car parade around the school for a nostalgic farewell. The 2020-2021 academic year began with most students in physical classrooms while eight out of 92 teachers taught remotely.

== Facilities history ==
=== Early locations ===
In the first twelve years, Hillel rented space from various Jewish organisations. The school opened in 1958 with a kindergarten and first grade in the facilities of the Hayim Greenberg Center at 19161 Schaefer Hwy, Detroit. Then, in 1960, the school relocated to United Hebrew Schools at 18977 Schaefer Hwy, Detroit. In 1962, the school moved to the Jewish Center, later known as Jimmy Prentis Morris Branch of the Jewish Community Center, at 15110 West Ten Mile Rd, Oak Park. From 1963, Hillel also held classes at the nearby Congregation B’nai Moshe at 14390 West Ten Mile, Oak Park.

=== Evolution of present campus ===
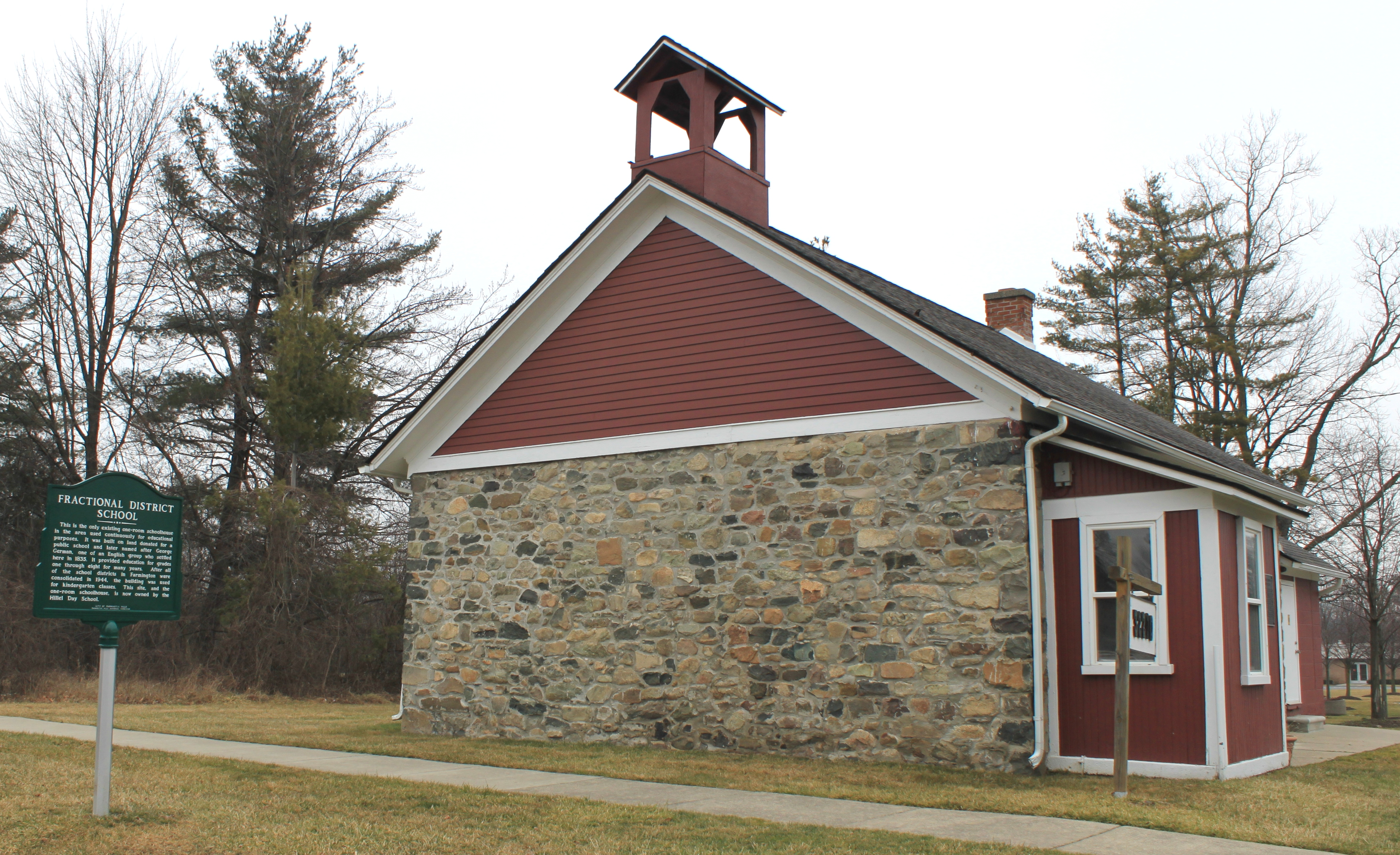
German School historic building at the entrance to Hillel Day School on Middlebelt Road in Farmington Hills. The building, erected c. 1870, is listed in the Register of Michigan State Historic Sites.

The era of renting came to an end in 1968, when the school broke ground on an 11-acre site in Farmington Hills. In 1970, a 20-room new school building was ready and Hillel moved to its permanent home at 32200 Middlebelt Road in Farmington Hills, with 270 students. The site included the c. 1870 German School historic building (better known as Little Red Schoolhouse) that from 1970 to 1987 was used for the kindergarten class.

By 1979 the school added another four classrooms. Due to increasing enrollment and overcrowding, in 1983 the school had to start using portable classrooms. In 1986, the school added the Davidson Wing with 12 more classrooms and a multi-purpose room for special events.

In 1996, an $8 million expansion and renovation added to the school a new media center, a gym, and a new school wing housing the 7–8 learning community on the second floor. In 2006, a $4 million expansion added to the school a bigger gym doubling as a theater with 800 seats capacity, along with a new lobby, offices, and an outside playing field.

In 2014–2017, the school underwent an extensive renovation, funded by the William and Audrey Farber Philanthropic Endowment Fund. The first phase of the renovation, designed by school architect Prakash Nair, included the "Central Heart" (an open space with a presentation platform and capacity for 300 people), the "Innovation Hub" with an art studio, science lab, a greenhouse, an audio-video studio and a makerspace, and the café and kitchen in place of the old small gym. In the second phase, existing main hallways lined with lockers and classrooms were demolished to the shell and rebuilt to create three open space learning communities: K–2 David and Nanci Farber learning community, the 3–6 William Davidson learning community, and the 7–8 learning community.

The latest addition to the school building happened in 2019, when the school expanded its Early Childhood Center wing. In 2022, a $3 million upgrade of the outdoor athletic facilities added an all-season synthetic field, running track, and two multi-purpose athletic courts. As part of this renovation, the historic Little Red Schoolhouse was repurposed into a hub for athletic support.

== Admissions and cost of attendance ==
Hillel welcomes Jewish children from all affiliations. Its religious policies aim to make all children, irrespective of their observance at home, feel comfortable and involved in school activities. Hillel requests families to respect classmates' levels of observance when arranging celebrations like birthdays and B'nai Mitzvah parties.

Hillel mandates full student vaccination for admission and continuous enrollment. In 2015, amidst Michigan's high vaccination waiver rates, Hillel announced it would no longer accept religious or philosophical waivers from parents who reject vaccination. Hillel based this decision on the Jewish law principle of pikuach nefesh, prioritizing human life above other religious rules. Headmaster Freedman stated, "As a religious school, we can determine whether refusal of the vaccine has any religious merit, and we decided it does not."

In 2004, Hillel started offering "lateral entry" for sixth graders without prior Jewish education. Before that, students were urged to join by second grade due to the school's intense focus on Judaic studies.

Tuition for the 2014–2015 academic year ranged from $11,280 for kindergarten to $17,975 for grades 1–8. In 2013–2014, 54 percent of the school's 564 students received financial aid. For the 2020–2021 school year, Hillel administered more than $3.2 million in financial aid, among 54 percent of the student body.

Beginning with the 2025-26 school year, the school offered a 30% discount on tuition for children of eligible Jewish communal professionals.

== Curriculum and students' life ==
From its founding, the school teaches Jewish and secular subjects in a dual curriculum. The Jewish curriculum includes modern Hebrew, Jewish history, Jewish prayers and holidays, the Tanakh, and Rabbinic literature. The secular curriculum follows the Michigan Department of Education academic standards.

In 2012, University of Michigan's linguistics professor Andries Coetzeea observed Hillel's 7th grade Hebrew class, taught exclusively in Hebrew with only occasional English explanations for Coetzeea. Despite his MA in Biblical Hebrew, the students had a better command of the language.

Hillel debuted its first student spring musical,"Fiddler On The Roof", in 1965 and has since maintained a vibrant performing arts department.

Hillel students celebrate both American and Jewish holidays. In 2018, instead of closing the school for the federal holiday named after Dr. King, Hillel honored his legacy by organizing diverse events, programs, and inviting speakers in order to educate the younger generation about promoting diversity and stopping prejudice. In 2013, Hillel marked a rare occasion as Thanksgiving and the first day of Hanukkah coincided for the first time since 1888. Students celebrated "Thanksgivukkah," creatively merging symbols from both holidays and crafting paper mashups like menorah-turkeys and bird-dreidels. Saul Rube, Hillel's dean of Judaic studies, said the playful combinations underscore a deeper connection, noting the Talmud's description of Hanukkah as a "holiday of thanksgiving."

In 2006, the school added an eighth-grade Israel trip to the curriculum.

The school's mascot is the Hawk. Hillel's athletics start in kindergarten with intramural programs and continue with interscholastic programs, where the Hillel Hawks compete against independent schools in various sports such as basketball, cross country, golf, soccer, tennis, and volleyball.

== Heads of school ==
Hillel Day School is a private, non-profit corporation administered by a headmaster, who acts under the direction of a board of trustees. Initially, executive management of the school was carried by one of its founding members in a position of school's president. As the school grew, positions of a supervising teacher, principal, and, finally, headmaster were introduced.

- Morris M. Jacobs, president (1958 – c. 1959)
- Naomi Floch, supervising teacher (c. 1959 – c. 1960), principal (c. 1960 – 1962)
- Rabbi Abraham Zentman, principal (1962–1963)
- Rabbi Emanuel Applebaum, headmaster (1963–1965)
- Simon Murciano, headmaster (1965–1970)
- Rabbi Joshua Kronenberg, headmaster (1970–1972)
- Rabbi Chaim Rozwaski, headmaster (1972–1975)
- Rabbi Robert Abramson, headmaster (1975–1988)
- Dr. Mark Smiley, principal (1988–1990), headmaster (1990–2003)
- Steven "Steve" Freedman, headmaster (2003–2019). Under Freedman's leadership, Hillel shut down its teachers’ union (2005), instituted the eighth-grade Israel trip (2006), became a non-affiliated community Jewish day school (2008), changed its governance model to a self-perpetuating board (2009), opened and expanded the Early Childhood Center (2010, 2019), and underwent an extensive renovation of its facilities (2014–2017) that among other things included a cafe with a kitchen that allowed Hillel to start a hot lunch program.
- Nathan "Naty" Katz, interim headmaster (2019–2020)
- Dr. Darin Katz (2020–present). Prior to coming to Hillel, Katz was the director of the upper school at Jack M. Barrack Hebrew Academy in Bryn Mawr, Pennsylvania.

== Notable alumni ==
- Mark A. Goldsmith (first graduating class of 1967), a judge of the United States District Court for the Eastern District of Michigan
- Robert Schostak (class of 1971), a political consultant and former chairman of the Michigan Republican Party
- Jeff Sudakin (class of 1985), music composer for film and TV
- Selma Blair (class of c. 1986), actress
- Charles Ornstein (class of 1988), Pulitzer Prize–winning journalist
- Jaime Ray Newman (class of 1992), American actress, producer and singer, 91st Academy Awards winner
- Samantha Woll (class of 1997), president of Isaac Agree Downtown Synagogue in Detroit
- Jeremy Moss (class of 2000), Democratic politician, Michigan Senate

== See also ==
- History of the Jewish people in Detroit
