= Cass Lake, Michigan =

- Village
- Village of Cass Lake
- Location within Oakland County

- Location within the state of Michigan
- Coordinates: 42°36′39″N 83°22′42″W
- Country: United States
- State: Michigan
- County: Oakland
- Township: West Bloomfield Township
- Incorporated: 2026

Government
  - Village President: Michael Johnson
  - Village Vice-President: Christopher LaDuke

Area
  - Village: 0.30 sq mi (0.78 (Note: Approximate area, as Cass Lake incorporated as a village since the last release of census data.) km^{2})
- Elevation: 935 ft (285 m)

Population (2026)
  - Estimate (2026): 437 (Note: Population estimate by Oakland County, as Cass Lake incorporated as a village since the last release of census data.)
  - Density: 2,000/sq mi (772.2/km^{2})
  - Metro: 4,296,250 (Metro Detroit)
- Time zone: UTC-5 (Eastern (EST))
  - Summer (DST): UTC-4 (EDT)
- ZIP code(s): 48324
- Area codes: 248 and 810
- Website: Official website (temporary)

Cass Lake is a village in West Bloomfield Township, Oakland County in the U.S. state of Michigan. The population was estimated by the County of Oakland to be 437 as of the establishment of the village in August, 2026.

== History ==
In 2025 the State of Michigan designated the area a village. In August 2026, the village charter was overwhelmingly approved, officially creating a municipal corporation to reflect the state designation, along with electing their first village board. This has officially made the village the newest municipality in Oakland County as well as the entire state. It is the first new municipality in Oakland County since Rochester Hills and Lake Angelus incorporated in 1984, and the first village to be incorporated in the county since Beverly Hills in 1958. Is is also the first new village in Michigan since the 1998 incorporation of Lake Isabella.

== Geography ==
According to news sources, the village has a total area of approximately 0.3 square miles (0.78 km^{2}), much of it is land, however the village boundaries will likely incorporate some of its namesake lake as well as the many manmade canals which thread throughout the community. The area of the village represents the area encompassed by the Zox HOA, which initially pursued the village designation.

== Government ==
The government of the Village of Cass Lake consists of elected and appointed officials. The elected officials include: three council members, one president, one vice-president, and one treasurer; the Clerk is appointed.

The village has a planning commission consisting of four citizens who are appointed by the Village Council, the initial members of which were appointed at the first Village Council meeting on August 25, 2026. One Village Council member also serves as the council liaison to the planning commission (a non-voting-term appointment running concurrently with the councilmember's term).

== Education ==
Cass Lake is in West Bloomfield School District and, within the district, the village is within the Gretchko Elementary School area boundary. The district has one high school, the West Bloomfield High School.
