= Rosetta A. Ferguson =

American politician (1920–2015)

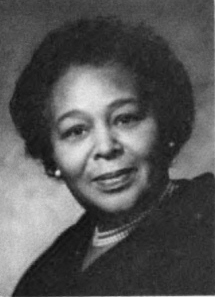

Member of the Michigan House of Representatives from the 20th district
- In office January 1, 1973 – 1978
- Preceded by: George F. Montgomery Sr.
- Succeeded by: Juanita Watkins

Member of the Michigan House of Representatives from the 9th district
- In office January 1, 1965 – 1972
- Preceded by: District established
- Succeeded by: George H. Edwards

Personal details
- Born: Rosetta A. Sexton; July 1, 1920 Florence, Mississippi
- Died: November 18, 2015 (aged 95)
- Party: Democratic
- Education: Detroit Institute of Technology

Rosetta A. Ferguson (née Sexton; July 1, 1920 – November 18, 2015) was a politician in Michigan, USA.

== Early life ==
Ferguson was born on July 1, 1920, in Florence, Mississippi, to parents Gaberil Sexton and Earnie Sexton.

== Education ==
Ferguson attended public schools in New Orleans and Detroit. She later attended Detroit Institute of Technology.

== Career ==
In 1961, Ferguson was a candidate in the primary for the position of delegate to Michigan state constitutional convention from Wayne County 5th district. On November 4, 1964, she was elected to the Michigan House of Representatives where she represented the 9th district from January 13, 1965, to 1972. On November 7, 1972, she was again elected to the Michigan house of representatives where she represented the 20th district from January 10, 1973, to 1978. She advocated for more coverage of ethnic history in textbooks. She was known for her opposition to drugs, especially marijuana legalization, and abortion. In an incident in 1977, on the house floor, Ferguson threw a glass ashtray at state representative Perry Bullard, which hit him in the head.

== Personal life ==
Ferguson married in 1935 and had four children. She was a member of the NAACP. Ferguson was Baptist.

== Death ==
Ferguson died on November 18, 2015, and was buried in Florence, Mississippi.
