= SSSM =

SSSM may refer to:

- Standard social science model
- Solomon Schechter School of Manhattan, a K-8 Jewish day school in New York City
- Serious Sam: Siberian Mayhem, a 2022 video game
