= Schechter Day School Network =

Organization of Jewish day schools in the U.S. and Canada

Coordinates: 40.75074°N 73.97105°W

The Schechter Day School Network
- Formation: 1965 (61 years ago)
- Type: organization of Jewish day schools that identify with Conservative Judaism
- Purpose: to promote: "the continued growth and vitality of its member schools, which serve a broad Jewish population and are characterized by Conservative thought and practice, high academic achievement and social responsibility, in a culture of joyous spiritual engagement, caring and community."
- Headquarters: 820 Second Avenue, New York, New York 10017, U.S.
- Formerly called: the Solomon Schechter Day School Association

The Schechter Day School Network, formerly the Solomon Schechter Day School Association, located at 820 Second Avenue, New York, New York, is an organization of Jewish day schools that identify with Conservative Judaism. The network provides guidance and resources for its member schools in the United States and Canada.

== Mission and functions ==
The express mission of the network is to promote:

the continued growth and vitality of its member schools, which serve a broad Jewish population and are characterized by Conservative thought and practice, achievement and social responsibility, in a culture of joyous spiritual engagement, caring and community.

The Association of Solomon Schechter Day Schools dates back to 1965, created as part of an effort to create standards and promote cooperation between the existing Conservative day schools and promote the establishment of new schools.

Among the network's major achievements is the publication, in conjunction with the Melton Research Center, of the MaToK curriculum for the teaching of Torah in elementary schools that combines the commitment to tradition, Hebrew language, and inquiry.

The network provides mentoring for new school heads; a fellowship that helps place a recent recipient of a rabbinical degree or graduate degree in Jewish education into an educational leadership position in one of the Schechter schools; placement services; consultation in such areas as the teaching of prayer; regional conferences on educational subjects for teachers and administrators; and support for curricular and marketing initiatives.

== History ==
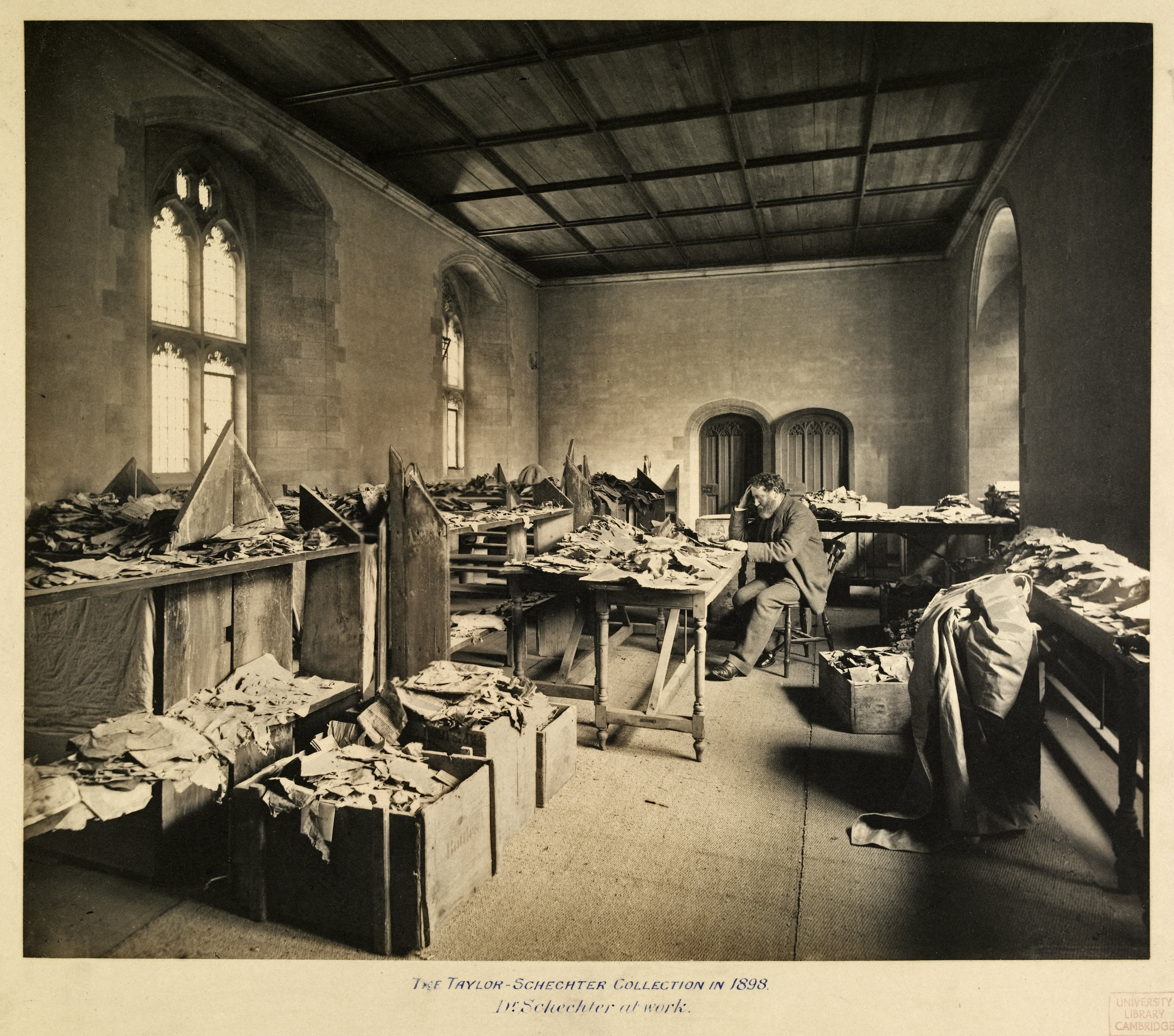
Solomon Schechter at work in Cambridge University Library, studying the fragments of the Cairo Geniza, c. 1898

The Brandeis School, in Lawrence, Nassau County, New York—one of the founding members of the Solomon Schechter association in 1965—was founded in 1930 by Rabbi Irving Miller as the Jewish Center School. It adopted its current name in 1945. Beth El Day School in Rockaway Park, Queens opened in 1951. During the 1950s and 1960s, additional schools opened throughout the country as parents began to seek schools that combined high general academic standards, authentic Jewish study and life, and open intellectual inquiry in all areas of study.

The first schools to adopt the name of Rabbi Solomon Schechter, the founder of Conservative Judaism in its 20th-century form, were the Solomon Schechter School of Queens, New York City and the Solomon Schechter Day School of Greater Philadelphia (since renamed as Perelman Jewish Day School).

In 1966, Solomon Schechter School of Westchester opened in White Plains, New York. The Solomon Schechter School of Nassau County began in 1967 and later became The Solomon Schechter School Long Island. The Hillel Day School in Farmington Hills, Michigan, a suburb of Detroit, celebrated its 50th anniversary in 2007.

The first Schechter school on the West Coast of the United States was Akiba Academy in Los Angeles, brought into existence in 1968 by a loose coalition of rabbis and leaders of several congregations. As additional day schools opened in Los Angeles, it merged with its host congregation, Sinai Temple, and became known as Sinai Akiba Academy.

Also well known are the Solomon Schechter Day School of Greater Boston (located in Newton, Massachusetts, founded in 1961 and currently enrolling over 500 students); the Solomon Schechter School of Manhattan, Perelman Academy in Philadelphia, and Solomon Schechter Day School of Metropolitan Chicago, (currently located in Northbrook, Illinois, and was founded in 1962). Canada's only Solomon Schechter Day School is located in Montreal and was founded in 1955.

By 1968, a high school in Brooklyn, New York was opened. Today there are approximately 50 Solomon Schechter Day Schools, including several high schools. Despite the dropping numbers of Conservative Jews worldwide, some of the Solomon Schechter Schools have continued to increase their number of students. One such school is Golda Och Academy, formerly known as the Solomon Schechter Day School of Essex and Union (NJ), which has over 800 students enrolled and has grown steadily since its founding in 1965. The school is also one of the largest, consisting of two campuses, an Upper and Lower School, both located in West Orange, New Jersey.

Solomon Schechter School of Westchester opened a new upper school campus in Hartsdale, New York, in 2001. The school now also has two campuses, both in Westchester, with more than 900 students in grades K-12. The school disaffiliated when the Schecter and Prizmah systems merged, and renamed itself a few years later to The Leffell School.

From 1993 to 2012 the network lost a third of its schools, as total enrollment dropped from 17,500 to 11,300 over the two decades. As of 2012, the Schechter Day School Network announced that it was considering seeking independence from the United Synagogue of Conservative Judaism so that the network and its 45 schools would be able to raise funds independently, with options of joining the RAVSAK network also considered as an option.

In 2016 the Schechter Day School Network became part of Prizmah: Center for Jewish Day Schools, a new organization encompassing five day school groups from different Jewish denominations. However, this led to the exit of some schools.
