= Javon Foster =

American football player (born 2000)

No. 73 – Cincinnati Bengals
- Position: Offensive tackle
- Roster status: Active

Personal information
- Born: March 31, 2000 (age 26); Detroit, Michigan, U.S.
- Listed height: 6 ft 5 in (1.96 m)
- Listed weight: 319 lb (145 kg)

Career information
- High school: West Bloomfield (West Bloomfield, Michigan)
- College: Missouri (2018–2023)
- NFL draft: 2024: 4th round, 114th overall pick

Career history
- Jacksonville Jaguars (2024); Cincinnati Bengals (2025–present)*
- * Offseason or practice squad member only

Awards and highlights
- First-team All-SEC (2023); Second-team All-SEC (2022)

Career NFL statistics as of 2024
- Games played: 4
- Stats at Pro Football Reference

Javon Foster (born March 31, 2000) is an American professional football offensive tackle for the Cincinnati Bengals of the National Football League (NFL). He played college football for the Missouri Tigers.

== Early life ==
Foster attended West Bloomfield High School in West Bloomfield, Michigan. He committed to the University of Missouri to play college football.

== College career ==
Foster played at Missouri from 2018 to 2023. He redshirted his first year in 2018 and played in two games in 2019 and nine games with two starts in 2020. In 2021, he became the starting left tackle and started 39 games from then until his senior year in 2023. He was named a first team All-Southeastern Conference (SEC) as a senior in 2023.

== Professional career ==
Foster participated in the 2024 Senior Bowl.

Pre-draft measurables
Height	Weight	Arm length	Hand span	Wingspan	40-yard dash	10-yard split	20-yard split	20-yard shuttle	Three-cone drill	Vertical jump	Broad jump	Bench press
6 ft 5 1/2 in (1.97 m)	313 lb (142 kg)	34 5/8 in (0.88 m)	9 5/8 in (0.24 m)	6 ft 11 3/8 in (2.12 m)	5.30 s	1.79 s	3.04 s	4.93 s	7.70 s	32.5 in (0.83 m)	8 ft 10 in (2.69 m)	18 reps
All values from NFL Combine/Pro Day

=== Jacksonville Jaguars ===
Foster was selected in the fourth round (114th overall) of the 2024 NFL draft by the Jacksonville Jaguars.

On August 26, 2025, Foster was waived by the Jaguars as part of final roster cuts.

=== Cincinnati Bengals ===
On August 28, 2025, Foster was signed to the Cincinnati Bengals' practice squad. He signed a reserve/future contract with Cincinnati on January 5, 2026.

== Personal life ==
Foster's father, Jerome, played in the NFL from 1983 to 1987.
