= Michigan's 20th House of Representatives district =

American legislative district

Michigan's 20th State House of Representatives district
Representative
Noah Arbit; D–West Bloomfield Township
- Demographics: 72.3% White; 11.5% Black; 3.9% Hispanic; 7.7% Asian; 0.1% Native American; 0.5% Other; 4.1% Multiracial
- Population (2024): 92,968

Michigan's 20th House of Representatives district is a legislative district within the Michigan House of Representatives located in Oakland County. The district was created in 1965, when the Michigan Supreme Court ordered the reapportionment of state legislative districts from a county-based system to a proportional one following the Supreme Court case Reynolds v. Sims. It is currently represented by Democrat Noah Arbit of West Bloomfield Township.

== List of representatives ==
Representative	Party	Years	Residence	Notes
George Montgomery Sr.	Democratic	1965–1972	Detroit	Reapportioned from the former Wayne County, 6th district; redistricted to the 5th district.
Rosetta A. Ferguson	Democratic	1973–1978	Detroit	Redistricted from the 9th district.
Juanita Watkins	Democratic	1979–1982	Detroit	Redistricted to the 16th district.
Rudy J. Nichols	Republican	1983–1984	Waterford Township	Resigned February 1984 after being elected to the Michigan Senate.
Claude A. Trim	Republican	1984 (Note: Elected in a 1984 special election to replace Rep. Rudy J. Nichols, who resigned.)–1992	Waterford Township	Previously served in the 60th district.
Jerry Vorva	Republican	1993–1994	Plymouth	
Gerald H. Law	Republican	1995–2000	Plymouth	Previously served in the 36th district; term limited.
John C. Stewart	Republican	2001–2006	Plymouth	Term limited.
Marc Corriveau	Democratic	2007–2010	Northville	
Kurt Heise	Republican	2011–2016	Plymouth	Resigned November 2016 after being elected Plymouth Township Supervisor.
Jeff Noble	Republican	2017–2018	Canton Township	
Matt Koleszar	Democratic	2019–2022	Plymouth	Redistricted to the 22nd district.
Noah Arbit	Democratic	2023–present	West Bloomfield Township	

== Historical district boundaries ==
Map	Description	Apportionment Plan	Notes
	Wayne County (part): Detroit (part)	1964 Apportionment Plan (Note: Referred to as the Austin-Kleiner plan.)	
	Wayne County (part): Detroit (part)	1972 Apportionment Plan (Note: Referred to as the Hatcher-Kleiner plan.)	
	Oakland County (part): Waterford Township; White Lake Township	1982 Apportionment Plan	
	Wayne County (part): Livonia (part); Northville; Northville Township; Plymouth; Plymouth Township	1992 Apportionment Plan	
	Wayne County (part): Canton Township (part); Northville (part); Northville Township; Plymouth; Plymouth Township; Wayne	2001 Apportionment Plan	
	Wayne County (part): Canton Township (part); Northville (part); Northville Township; Plymouth; Plymouth Township	2011 Apportionment Plan	
	Oakland County (part): Bloomfield Township (part); Commerce Township (part); Keego Harbor; Orchard Lake Village; Sylvan Lake; West Bloomfield Township	2021 Apportionment Plan (Note: Referred to as the Hickory plan.)	

== Recent elections ==
=== 2020s ===
2026 Michigan House of Representatives election
Party	Candidate	Votes	%
Democratic	Noah Arbit (incumbent)	30,801	59.37
Republican	S. David Sullivan	21,075	40.63
Total votes		51,876	100
Democratic hold			

2024 Michigan House of Representatives election
Party	Candidate	Votes	%
Democratic	Noah Arbit (incumbent)	31,764	53.23
Republican	Brendan Cowley	27,909	46.77
Total votes		59,673	100
Democratic hold			

2022 Michigan House of Representatives election
Party	Candidate	Votes	%
Democratic	Noah Arbit	27,824	56.64
Republican	Albert Mansour	21,303	43.36
Total votes		49,127	100
Democratic hold			

2020 Michigan House of Representatives election
Party	Candidate	Votes	%
Democratic	Matt Koleszar (incumbent)	33,034	55.09
Republican	John Lacny	26,931	44.91
Total votes		59,965	100
Democratic hold			

=== 2010s ===
2018 Michigan House of Representatives election
Party	Candidate	Votes	%
Democratic	Matt Koleszar	24,797	51.42
Republican	Jeff Noble (incumbent)	23,430	48.58
Total votes		48,227	100
Democratic gain from Republican			

2016 Michigan House of Representatives election
Party	Candidate	Votes	%
Republican	Jeff Noble	27,440	53.59
Democratic	Colleen Pobur	23,768	46.41
Total votes		51,208	100
Republican hold			

2014 Michigan House of Representatives election
Party	Candidate	Votes	%
Republican	Kurt L. Heise (incumbent)	21,425	61.42
Democratic	Nate Smith-Tyge	13,459	38.58
Total votes		34,884	100
Republican hold			

2012 Michigan House of Representatives election
Party	Candidate	Votes	%
Republican	Kurt L. Heise (incumbent)	27,357	56.06
Democratic	Tim Roraback	21,446	43.94
Total votes		48,803	100
Republican hold			

2010 Michigan House of Representatives election
Party	Candidate	Votes	%
Republican	Kurt L. Heise	20,920	58.03
Democratic	Joan Wadsworth	15,128	41.97
Total votes		36,048	100
Republican gain from Democratic			

=== 2000s ===
2008 Michigan House of Representatives election
Party	Candidate	Votes	%
Democratic	Marc R. Corriveau (incumbent)	30,415	58.99
Republican	Jerry Vorva	21,142	41.01
Total votes		51,557	100
Democratic hold			

2006 Michigan House of Representatives election
Party	Candidate	Votes	%
Democratic	Marc R. Corriveau	20,056	51.16
Republican	Mark J. Abbo	19,146	48.84
Total votes		39,202	100
Democratic gain from Republican			

2004 Michigan House of Representatives election
Party	Candidate	Votes	%
Republican	John C. Stewart (incumbent)	28,732	59.63
Democratic	Marc R. Corriveau	19,448	40.37
Total votes		48,180	100
Republican hold			

2002 Michigan House of Representatives election
Party	Candidate	Votes	%
Republican	John C. Stewart (incumbent)	19,910	61.23
Democratic	Mark B. Blackwell	11,581	35.61
Libertarian	James R. Dean	1,027	3.16
Total votes		32,518	100
Republican hold			

2000 Michigan House of Representatives election
Party	Candidate	Votes	%
Republican	John C. Stewart	30,427	64.48
Democratic	David G. Gray	16,759	35.52
Total votes		47,186	100
Republican hold			

=== 1990s ===
1998 Michigan House of Representatives election
Party	Candidate	Votes	%
Republican	Gerald H. Law	27,062	72.91
Democratic	Fred DiIacovo	8,860	23.87
Libertarian	Doug MacDonald	1,193	3.21
Total votes		37,115	100
Republican hold			
