= Jeff Noble =

American pastor and politician (born 1961)

Member of the Michigan House of Representatives from the 20th district
- In office January 1, 2017 – January 1, 2019
- Preceded by: Kurt Heise
- Succeeded by: Matt Koleszar

Personal details
- Born: March 31, 1961 (age 65) Wilmington, Ohio, U.S.
- Party: Republican
- Spouse: Myra Noble
- Occupation: Pastor, politician (former)

Jeff Noble (born March 31, 1961) is an American pastor and former politician from Michigan.

== Early life ==
Noble was born in Wilmington, Ohio.

== Education ==
In 1984, Noble graduated from Francis Marion College. In 1996, he earned a M.Div. degree from Southeastern Baptist Theological Seminary.

== Career ==
In 1999, Noble became a Lead Pastor of Main Street Baptist Church in Canton, Michigan. In 2008, He partnered Main Street Baptist with the First Baptist Church of Plymouth and created Praise Baptist Church, where he continued pastoring until August 2017. In November 2017, he founded Four Winds Church.

On November 8, 2016, Noble won election as member of Michigan House of Representatives for District 20. He defeated Colleen Pobur (D) with 53.59% of the votes. He served District 20 until January 2019.

Noble is currently the Senior Pastor of Four Winds Church in Livonia, Michigan.

== Personal life ==
Noble was married to his wife Myra until her death in 2021. They have three children.
