= West Bloomfield School District =

School district in Michigan

Address
- 5810 Commerce Rd. West Bloomfield Township, Michigan West Bloomfield, Oakland, Michigan, 48324

District information
- Type: Public
- Motto: Educating Students to be their best IN and FOR the world
- Grades: PK – 12
- Established: 1949
- Superintendent: Dr. Dania Bazzi
- Schools: 7 schools, 1 high, 1 middle, 4 elementary, 1 preschool
- Budget: $96,186,000 2022-2023 expenditures
- NCES District ID: 2635820

Students and staff
- Students: 4,727 (2024-2025)
- Teachers: 296.69 (on an FTE basis) (2024-2025)
- Staff: 670.4 FTE (2024-2025)
- Student–teacher ratio: 15.93 (2024-2025)

Other information
- Website: www.wbsd.org

The West Bloomfield School District is a public school district in Metro Detroit in the U.S. state of Michigan, serving portions of West Bloomfield and Sylvan Lake, all of Cass Lake and Keego Harbor, and most of Orchard Lake Village.

== History ==
Settled in the early days of the 19th century, the district was originally a farming community. Late in the 19th and early in the 20th century, it became a popular lake resort area, accessible from Detroit by interurban railway. In the natural course of suburbanization, it became a highly desirable suburban bedroom community and today is a well developed and maintained area of single family homes and some up-scale condominiums and apartments.

As a sprawling 19th Century farming community, there were several small school districts that operated one-room schoolhouses. By 1926, the Scotch district had a brick school building, as well as the Keego Harbor District. Voters in the Green, Hosner, Keego Harbor and Scotch districts chose to merge districts on May 31, 1949, forming the present-day district.

== Schools ==
List of Schools
School	Grades	Built	Notes
West Bloomfield Preschool Academy	Pre-K	1926	Housed in the former Scotch Elementary
Doherty Elementary	K–5	1969	
Gretchko Elementary	K–5	1995	
Scotch Elementary	K–5	1989	
Sheiko Elementary	K–5	1957	Formerly known as Green Elementary. To be rebuilt as part of 2023 bond issue.
West Bloomfield Middle School	6–8	2022	
West Bloomfield High School	9–12	1971	

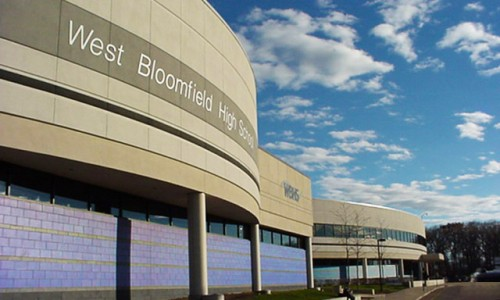
Exterior of West Bloomfield High School

== Former schools ==
=== Ealy Elementary ===
Built in 1966 at 5475 West Maple Road, Ealy closed in summer 1983 due to declining enrollment. It reopened in 1986 but closed in summer 2013. The building has been demolished.

=== Orchard Lake Middle School ===
Built as a junior high school in 1965, OLMS became the high school between 1967 and 1971. It then became one of the district's middle schools until combining with Abbott Middle School in 2022 within a new building on the same site. It has been demolished.

=== Abbott Middle School ===
This building, at 3380 Orchard Lake Road, was built to be the district's high school in 1955. The architect was George D. Mason & Co. It became a junior high school in 1967, then closed in spring 1971. In fall 1972 it reopened as Abbott Middle School. It then housed Roosevelt Elementary when the middle schools were combined. Roosevelt Elementary closed at the end of the 2023–24 school year and the district intends to use the building for administration.

=== Roosevelt Elementary ===
The building at 2065 Cass Lake Road in Keego Harbor was built in 1920 by the Keego Harbor school district, which was annexed into WBSD in 1949. Fisher Brothers architecture firm was the original designers, with Robert O. Derrick designing the 1928 extensions. Prior to 1955 it was a K-12 school. The building, considered the state's oldest operating school closed in the summer of 2022 due to a ceiling collapse in an unused classroom. The district felt it safer to move the students to the vacant Abbott Middle School for the following school year. The school is slated for demolition.

=== Keego Harbor School ===
Built at the corner of Orchard Lake Road and Pridham St in 1914, Keego Harbor school had four classrooms, indoor toilets, and a stone foundation. By World War II it was no longer used as a school, but was used by the district for dances and recreation. It was demolished in 1963.

== Administration ==
=== Board of education ===
The board is responsible for carrying out mandatory laws as expressed in the Michigan Constitution and Michigan Statutes, Federal Laws and Regulations relating to schools and school districts. The three main responsibilities of the board are:

1. Hiring the superintendent
2. Adopting policies
3. Adopting the budget

=== West Bloomfield School District Superintendents ===
- Warren W. Abbott (1949-1952)
- Dr. Leif A. Hougen (1952-1968)
- Dr. Anthony Witham (1968-1973)
- Dr. Jerry J. Herman (1973-1982)
- Dr. Seymour Gretchko (1982-2002)
- Dr. Gary Faber (2002-2008)
- Dr. JoAnne Andrees (2008-2012)
- Dr. Gerald D. Hill (2012–2022)
- Dr. Dania Bazzi (2022–Present)

== Athletics ==
West Bloomfield Schools are a voluntary member of the Michigan High School Athletic Association (MHSAA). West Bloomfield High School is a member of the Oakland Activities Association which comprises 24 Oakland County schools. It is divided into three or four divisions in order to develop equitable competition. Realignment takes place annually to ensure that the goals and criteria are met.
