= Juanita Watkins =

American politician (born 1939)

Member of the Michigan House of Representatives from the 16th district
- In office January 1, 1983 – December 31, 1990
- Preceded by: Matthew McNeely
- Succeeded by: Hansen Clarke

Member of the Michigan House of Representatives from the 20th district
- In office January 1, 1979 – December 31, 1982
- Preceded by: Rosetta A. Ferguson
- Succeeded by: Rudy J. Nichols

Personal details
- Born: May 11, 1939 (age 87) Chicago, Illinois
- Party: Democratic
- Education: Wendell Phillips High School; Wayne State University's Labor School

Juanita Watkins (born May 11, 1939) is a former member of the Michigan House of Representatives.

== Early life ==
Watkins was born on May 11, 1939, in Chicago, Illinois.

== Education ==
Watkins graduated from Wendell Phillips High School. Later, she graduated from Wayne State University's Labor School.

== Career ==
In 1976, Watkins was defeated in the Democratic primary for the Michigan House of Representatives seat representing the 20th district. On November 7, 1978, Watkins was elected to the Michigan House of Representatives where she represented the 20th district from January 10, 1979, to December 31, 1982. On November 2, 1982, Watkins was elected to the Michigan House of Representatives where she represented the 16th district from January 12, 1983, to December 31, 1990. In 1984, Watkins served as a delegate to Democratic National Convention from Michigan. In 1990, Watkins was defeated in the primary for the position of United States Representative from Michigan 13th District. In 1976, Watkins was defeated in the primary for the Michigan House of Representatives seat representing the 13th district.

== Personal life ==
Watkins had four children. Watkins is a member of the NAACP.
