= John C. Stewart =

American politician from Michigan

The Honorable John C. Stewart Esq.

Member of the Michigan House of Representatives from the 20th district
- In office January 1, 2001 – December 31, 2006
- Preceded by: Gerald Law
- Succeeded by: Marc Corriveau

Personal details
- Born: May 1, 1949 (age 77) Wyandotte, Michigan
- Party: Republican
- Spouse: Beth
- Education: Detroit College of Law (J.D.); Wayne State University (M.A.); Eastern Michigan University (B.A.)

John C. Stewart was a Republican member of the Michigan House of Representatives from 2001 through 2006 representing a portion of Wayne County.

Prior to his election to the House, Stewart was an attorney in private practice in Plymouth. He also served as a trustee of Plymouth Township for one term, from 1988 to 1992. He was re-elected in 2020 and 2024. His current term expires in 2028.
