= Kurt Heise =

American politician (born 1966)

The Honorable Kurt Heise
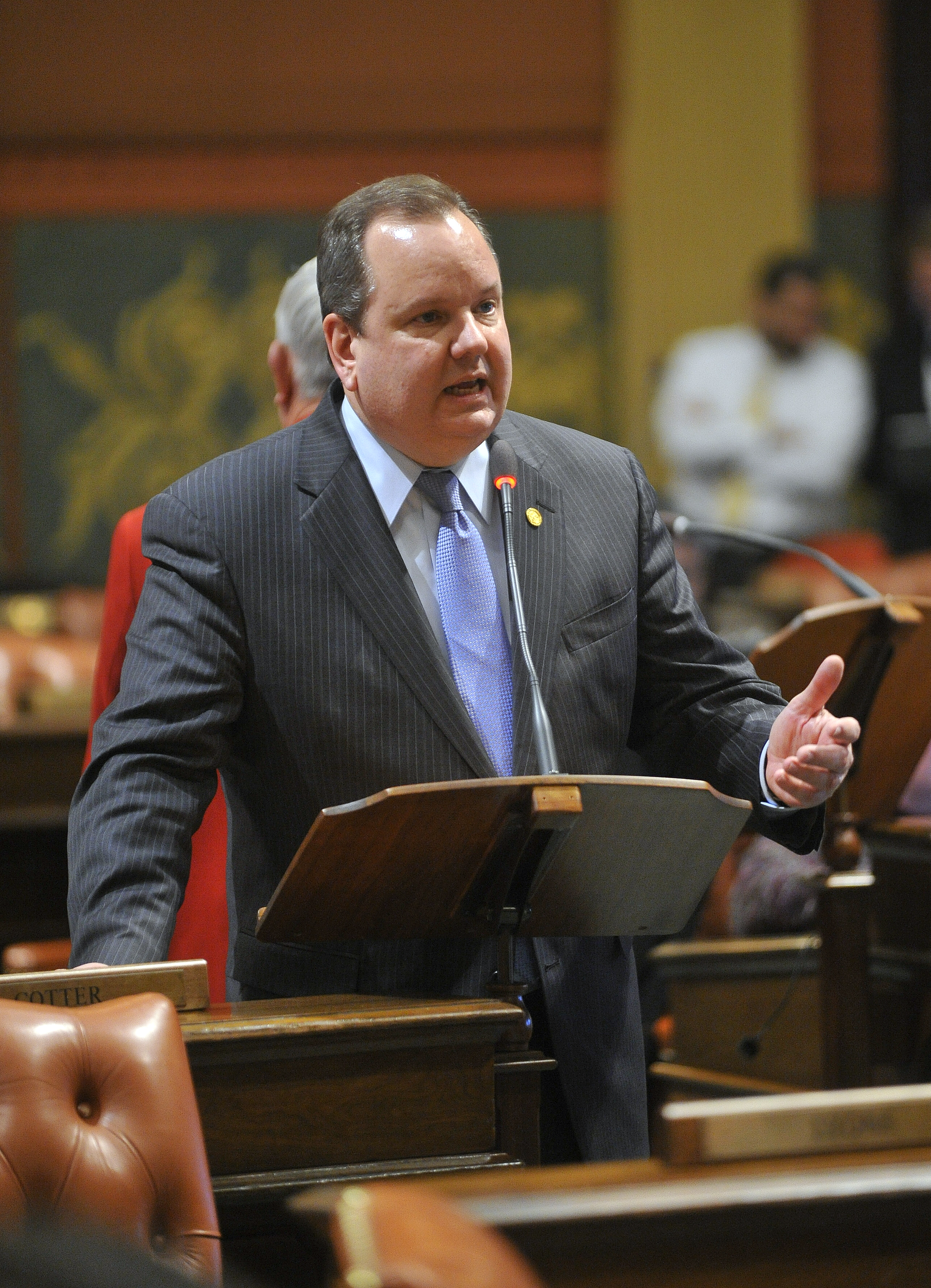
- Kurt Heise speaking in January 2014

Member of the Michigan House of Representatives from the 20th district
- In office January 1, 2011 – November 18, 2016
- Preceded by: Marc Corriveau
- Succeeded by: Jeff Noble

Personal details
- Born: February 9, 1966 (age 60) Dearborn, Michigan
- Party: Republican
- Spouse: Catherine
- Children: Katie & Claire
- Education: Wayne State University Law School (J.D.); University of Michigan
- Website: State Rep. Kurt Heise

Kurt Heise (born February 9, 1966) is a Republican politician from Michigan formerly serving in the Michigan House of Representatives.

He served in the state House from 2011 to his resignation on November 18, 2016.

Prior to his election to the House of Representatives, Heise was the director of the Wayne County Department of Environment and county drain commissioner from 2003 to 2009. He is a municipal attorney and environmental consultant, and a member of the Blue Ribbon Commission on Lake St. Clair.

He is also the primary backer of a bill currently on the House floor (5/20/2015) that would exempt much of the specifics of Michigan's energy infrastructure from inquiries under the Freedom of Information Act. Heise formally announced his candidacy for the Republican nomination for Plymouth Township Supervisor in the 2016 election but was kicked off the ballot due to unfinished paperwork. Despite being kicked off the ballot, Heise won a write-in campaign in the Republican primary election for Plymouth Township Supervisor.

== Political positions ==
In 2022, as Plymouth Township Supervisor, Heise recommended using the township's $2.83 million portion of the federal American Rescue Plan Act (ARPA) for golf course and sidewalk updates. This caused controversy among some Plymouth Township residents, who felt that the funds should go toward road repairs and feared that the sidewalk projects would be used to justify cancelling school bus routes.

In the 2022 Michigan gubernatorial election, Heise supported Tudor Dixon for governor. Dixon lost to incumbent Governor Gretchen Whitmer.

== U.S. House of Representatives elections ==
=== 2018 ===
In 2018 he filed to run to replace two term Representative Dave Trott. However, in February he withdrew from the race and endorsed State Senate Leader Mike Kowall.
