= West Bloomfield Township, Michigan =

- Charter township
- Charter Township of West Bloomfield
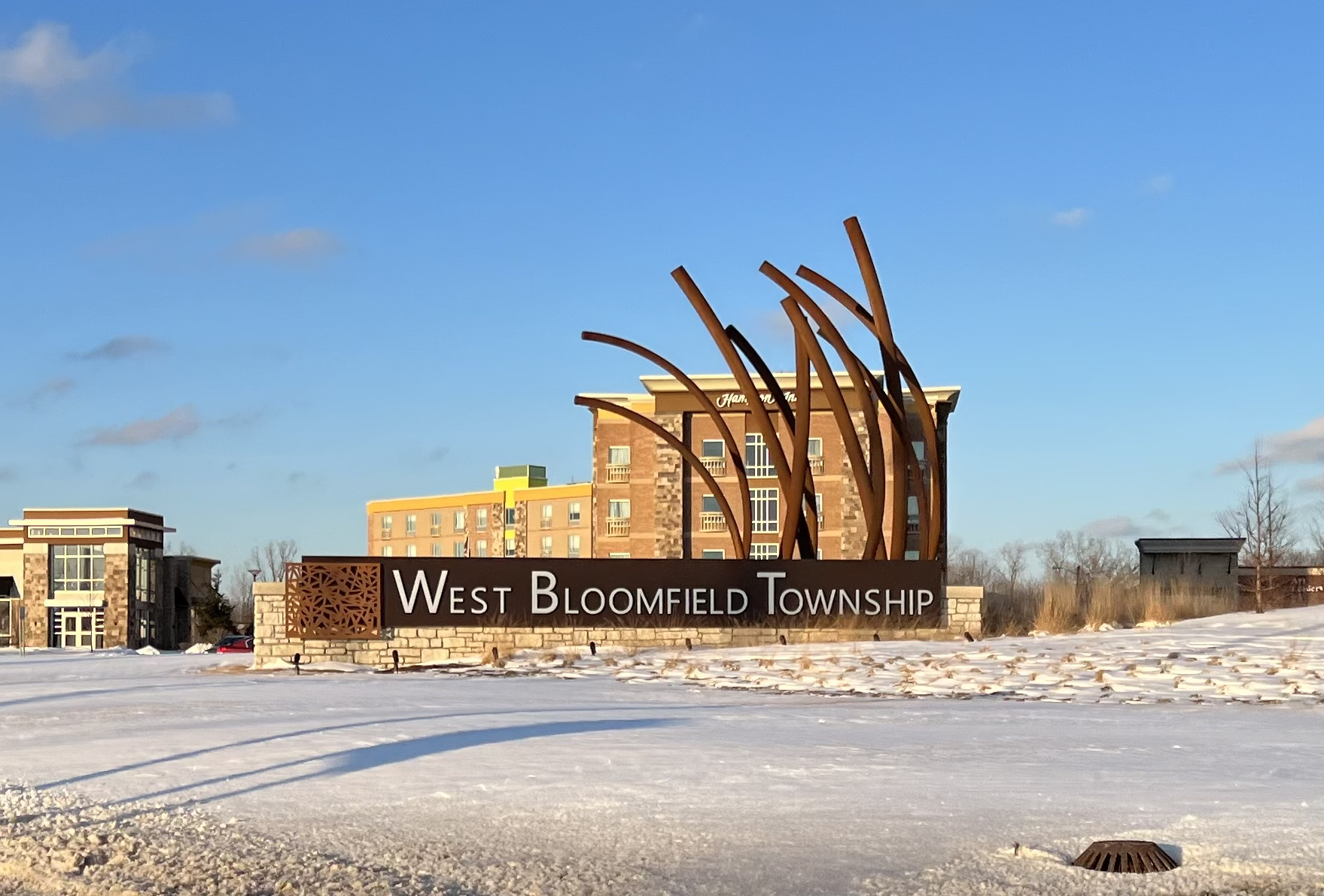
- West Bloomfield Township sign at M-10 and 14 Mile Road

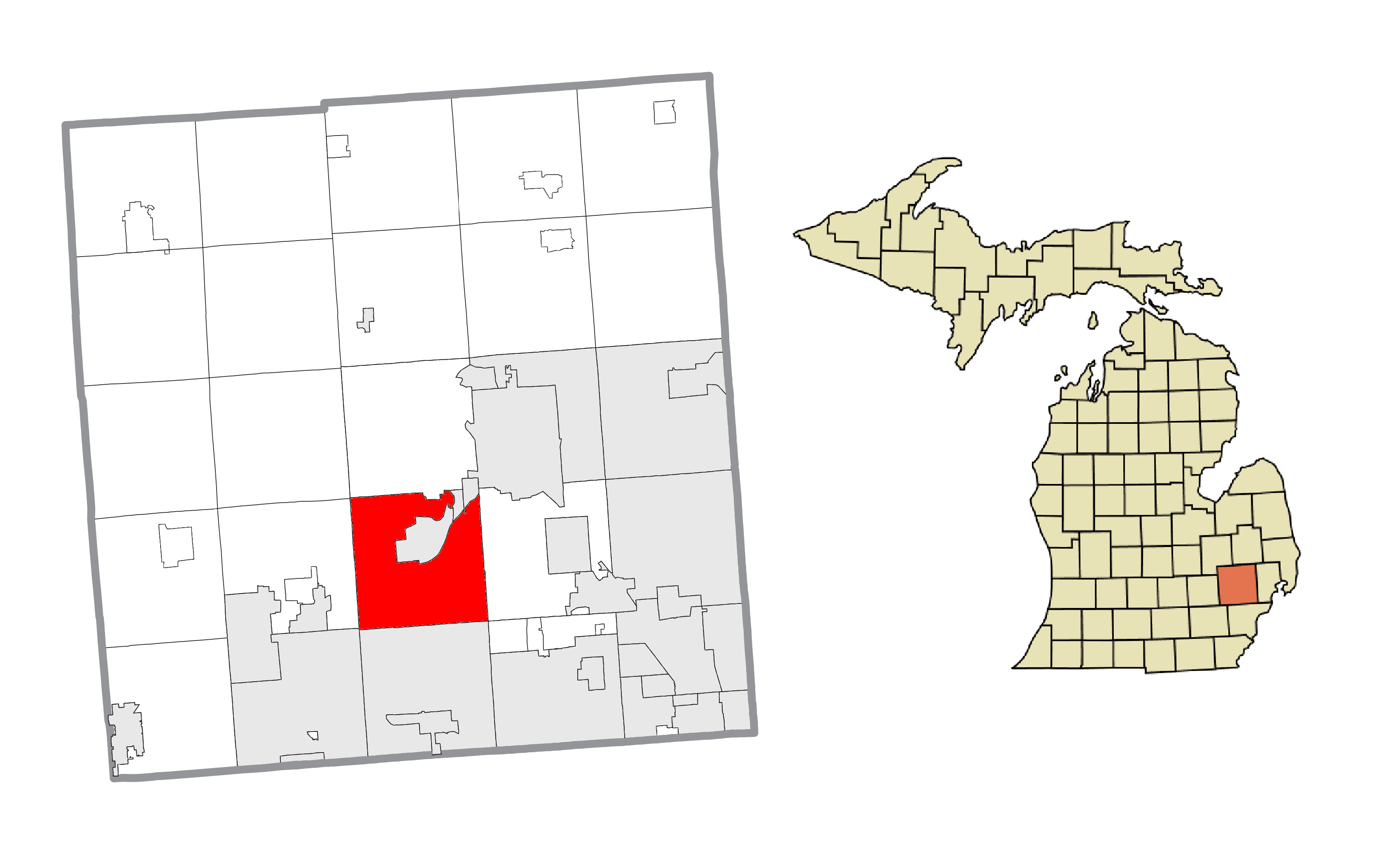
- Location within Oakland County

- Location within the state of Michigan
- Coordinates: 42°34′16″N 83°22′29″W
- Country: United States
- State: Michigan
- County: Oakland
- Established: 1833

Government
  - Type: Supervisor-Board of trustees
  - Supervisor: Jonathan Warshay
  - Clerk: Debbie Binder
  - Treasurer: Teri Weingarden
  - Trustees: Jim Manna, Diane Rosenfeld Swimmer, Vincent Kirkwood, Michael Patton

Area
  - Charter township: 31.2 sq mi (80.9 km^{2})
  - Land: 27.3 sq mi (70.8 km^{2})
  - Water: 3.9 sq mi (10.1 km^{2}) 12.49%
- Elevation: 980 ft (300 m)

Population (2020)
  - Charter township: 65,888
  - Density: 2,369.5/sq mi (914.9/km^{2})
  - Metro: 4,296,250 (Metro Detroit)
- Time zone: UTC-5 (Eastern (EST))
  - Summer (DST): UTC-4 (EDT)
- ZIP code(s): 48302, 48320, 48322–48325, 48328
- Area code: 248
- FIPS code: 26-85480
- GNIS feature ID: 1627244
- Website: wbtownship.org

West Bloomfield Township (commonly, West Bloomfield) is a charter township in Oakland County in the U.S. state of Michigan. A northwestern suburb of Detroit, West Bloomfield is located roughly 27 miles (43.5 km) from downtown Detroit. As of the 2020 census, the township had a population of 65,888.

== Communities ==
- Westacres is an unincorporated community in the township at Keith and Commerce Roads (42°36′00″N 83°25′30″W Elevation: 925 ft (282 m).).
- Cass Lake is a village in the northern part of the township at the eastern terminus of Greer Road along Cass Lake. It is conterminous with the neighborhood of Zox. In 2025 the state of Michigan designated the area a village. In August 2026, the village charter was overwhelmingly approved, officially creating a municipal corporation to reflect the state designation, along with electing their first village board. This has officially made Cass Lake the newest municipality in Oakland County as well as the state of Michigan. It is the first new municipality in Oakland County since Rochester Hills and Lake Angelus incorporated in 1984, and the first village to be incorporated in the county since Beverly Hills in 1958. This is also the first new village in Michigan since the 1998 incorporation of Lake Isabella.

== Geography ==
West Bloomfield is sometimes referred to by its residents as the "lake township of Oakland County", due to it being heavily dotted with small and medium-sized lakes. Cass Lake, the largest lake in the county, is in part of West Bloomfield, and Pine Lake, which has a private country club on its shore, is only a few miles away from Cass and lies completely within West Bloomfield. In addition, directly west of Pine Lake is Orchard Lake, which also has a private country club on its shore. Orchard Lake is surrounded by the city of Orchard Lake Village. Several smaller lakes are scattered around these larger ones.

Orchard Lake Road runs north–south through the middle of the township and is the main artery of West Bloomfield's economy along with West Maple Road (15 Mile Rd.), flanked on each side by long strip malls and shopping complexes. There are many high-end boutique stores and expensive restaurants to visit. Most of the township's population growth has occurred since the 1960s, as many residents moved there from the inner ring Detroit suburbs. West Bloomfield is located in south-central Oakland County about 10 miles (20 km) to the northwest from the Detroit city limits and has borders with Bloomfield Township to its east, Farmington Hills to its south, Commerce Township to its west, and four communities to its north: Waterford Township, Orchard Lake Village, Keego Harbor, and Sylvan Lake. The communities of West Bloomfield, Orchard Lake Village, Keego Harbor, and Sylvan Lake make up what is known as Greater West Bloomfield.

According to the United States Census Bureau, the township has a total area of 31.2 square miles (81 km^{2}), of which 27.3 square miles (71 km^{2}) is land and 3.9 square miles (10 km^{2}), or 12.49%, is water.

== Economy ==
=== Top employers ===
According to the Charter Township's 2026 Annual Budget, the top employers in the township are:

| # | Employer | # of Employees |
|---|---|---|
| 1 | Henry Ford West Bloomfield Hospital | 1,937 |
| 2 | West Bloomfield Schools | 624 |
| 3 | Charter Township of West Bloomfield | 354 |

== Transportation ==
=== Highways ===
A short portion of Northwestern Highway (M-10) runs into West Bloomfield in its southeast for ~1/8th of a mile before terminating at Orchard Lake Rd. This is the only designated highway which runs into West Bloomfield, while several more pass within close proximity. Telegraph Rd (US-24), a main thoroughfare of Oakland County and Metro Detroit runs about 1/3rd of a mile northeast of West Bloomfield’s northeast corner. To the townships west, the Haggerty Connector(M-5) passes 4/10ths of a mile west of the townships border with Commerce along 14 mile road, granting the township a close highway connection to I-275, I-696, and I-96.

=== Trails ===
The West Bloomfield Trail bisects the township in an east-west orientation, linking the Michigan Air Line Trail in Commerce to the west, with the Clinton River Trail in Pontiac to the Northeast. The West Bloomfield Trail is a Rail trail constructed along a rail line first built by the Michigan Air Line Railway to connect Pontiac and Jackson, before coming under the control of Grand Trunk Western, who abandoned the line in 1984. The township also keeps and maintains 68 miles of sidewalks and bridges, collectively referred to as “non-motorized Pedestrian Safety Pathways” or “Safety Paths”, which connect the townships neighborhoods to schools, parks, and local businesses.

=== Transit ===
West Bloomfield is served by the Suburban Mobility Authority for Regional Transportation (SMART) 400, 405, 780, and 851 routes, connecting it to several nearby communities and Detroit.

== Government ==
=== Structure ===
West Bloomfield is a Charter Township, a unique type of municipality in Michigan which grants the township a greater tax levy and home rule authority than its general law counterparts, but still less than that of a city. General Law townships are limited to a single mill without voter approval for special purpose, subject to the local government cap of 15/18 cumulative mills levied between township, county and school districts. A Charter Township can levy up to 5 mills without voter approval, while 5 more can be levied by voter approval for specific purposes up to a total levy of 10 mills. West Bloomfield officially became a charter township on April 1st 1982, following a decision of the board at a regular board meeting in early March of the same year.

=== Federal, state, and county legislators ===
United States House of Representatives
| District | Representative | Party | Since |
|---|---|---|---|
| 11th | Haley Stevens | Democratic | 2019 |

Michigan Senate
| District | Senator | Party | Since |
|---|---|---|---|
| 13th | Rosemary Bayer | Democratic | 2023 |

Michigan House of Representatives
| District | Representative | Party | Since |
|---|---|---|---|
| 20th | Noah Arbit | Democratic | 2023 |

Oakland County Board of Commissioners
| District | Commissioner | Party | Since |
|---|---|---|---|
| 10 | Kirsten Nelson | Democratic | 2019 |
| 11 | Marcia Gershenson | Democratic | 2005 |

=== Board members ===
All Township board members are elected at-large in accordance with Michigan law.

| Position | Name | Party | Since |
|---|---|---|---|
| Supervisor | Jonathan Warshay | Democratic | 2016 (Trustee), 2024 (Supervisor) |
| Clerk | Debbie Binder | Democratic | 2016 |
| Treasurer | Teri Weingarden | Democratic | 2008 |
| Trustee | Diane Rosenfeld Swimmer | Democratic | 2012 |
| Trustee | Jim Manna | Democratic | 2016 |
| Trustee | Vincent Kirkwood | Democratic | 2024 |
| Trustee | Michael Patton | Independent | 2025 |

== Education ==
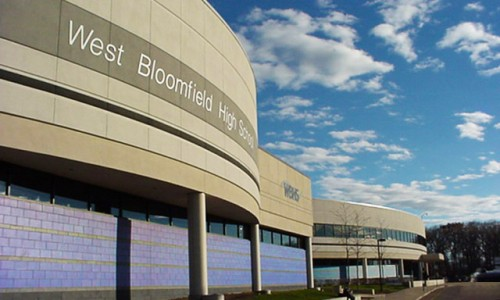
West Bloomfield High School

West Bloomfield Township is serviced by seven school districts, more than any other municipality in Oakland County. The school districts that serve the township are the West Bloomfield School District, Waterford School District, Farmington Public Schools, Birmingham City School District, Pontiac School District, Walled Lake School District, and the Bloomfield Hills School District.

West Bloomfield High School and the Frankel Jewish Academy of Metropolitan Detroit are in West Bloomfield proper, and St. Mary's Preparatory is in Orchard Lake Village.

Catholic schools are under the Roman Catholic Archdiocese of Detroit. St. William Catholic Church, which includes portions of West Bloomfield in its service area, operates St. William Catholic School, a K–8 school in Walled Lake.

The West Bloomfield Township Public Library serves West Bloomfield. In 1999 this library and the Awaji City Library in Awaji, Hyogo, Japan were paired as sister institutions.

== Religion ==
West Bloomfield is home to the largest Jewish population in Michigan. Catholic Churches are under the Archdiocese of Detroit. Prince of Peace Church is in West Bloomfield. St. William Church in Walled Lake includes portions of West Bloomfield in its service area.

== Demographics ==
As of the census of 2010, there were 64,690 people, 24,411 households, and 18,040 families living in the township. The population density was 2,374.3 inhabitants per square mile (916.7/km^{2}). There were 24,410 housing units at an average density of 893.6 units per square mile (345.0 units/km^{2}). The racial makeup of the township was 77.6% White, 11.4% Black or African American, 0.1% Native American, 8.4% Asian, 0.02% Pacific Islander, 0.4% from other races, and 2.0% from two or more races. Hispanic or Latino of any race were 1.60% of the population.

As of the census of 2000, there were 64,860 people, 23,414 households, and 18,192 families living in the township. The population density was 2,374.3 inhabitants per square mile (916.7/km^{2}). There were 24,410 housing units at an average density of 893.6 units per square mile (345.0 units/km^{2}). The racial makeup of the township was 84.25% White, 5.18% Black or African American, 0.12% Native American, 7.81% Asian, 0.02% Pacific Islander, 0.38% from other races, and 2.25% from two or more races. Hispanic or Latino of any race were 1.40% of the population.

There were 23,414 households, out of which 37.0% had children under the age of 18 living with them, 69.5% were married couples living together, 5.8% had a female householder with no husband present, and 22.3% were non-families. 19.4% of all households were made up of individuals, and 7.5% had someone living alone who was 65 years of age or older. The average household size was 2.74 and the average family size was 3.17.

In the township, 26.4% of the population was under the age of 18, 5.2% was between 18 and 24, 27.1% from 25 to 44, 27.9% from 45 to 64, and 13.4% were 65 years of age or older. The median age was 40 years. For every 100 females, there were 96.8 males. For every 100 females age 18 and over, there were 92.9 males.

According to a 2007 estimate, the median income for a household in the township was $98,832, and the median income for a family was $113,191. Males had a median income of $74,557 versus $45,339 for females. The per capita income for the township was $44,885. About 1.6% of families and 2.7% of the population were below the poverty line, including 3.0% of those under age 18 and 2.6% of those age 65 and over.

=== Ethnic groups ===
West Bloomfield has a large Jewish population. It is home to the Jewish Community Center of Metropolitan Detroit and the Frankel Jewish Academy, a private Jewish community high school.

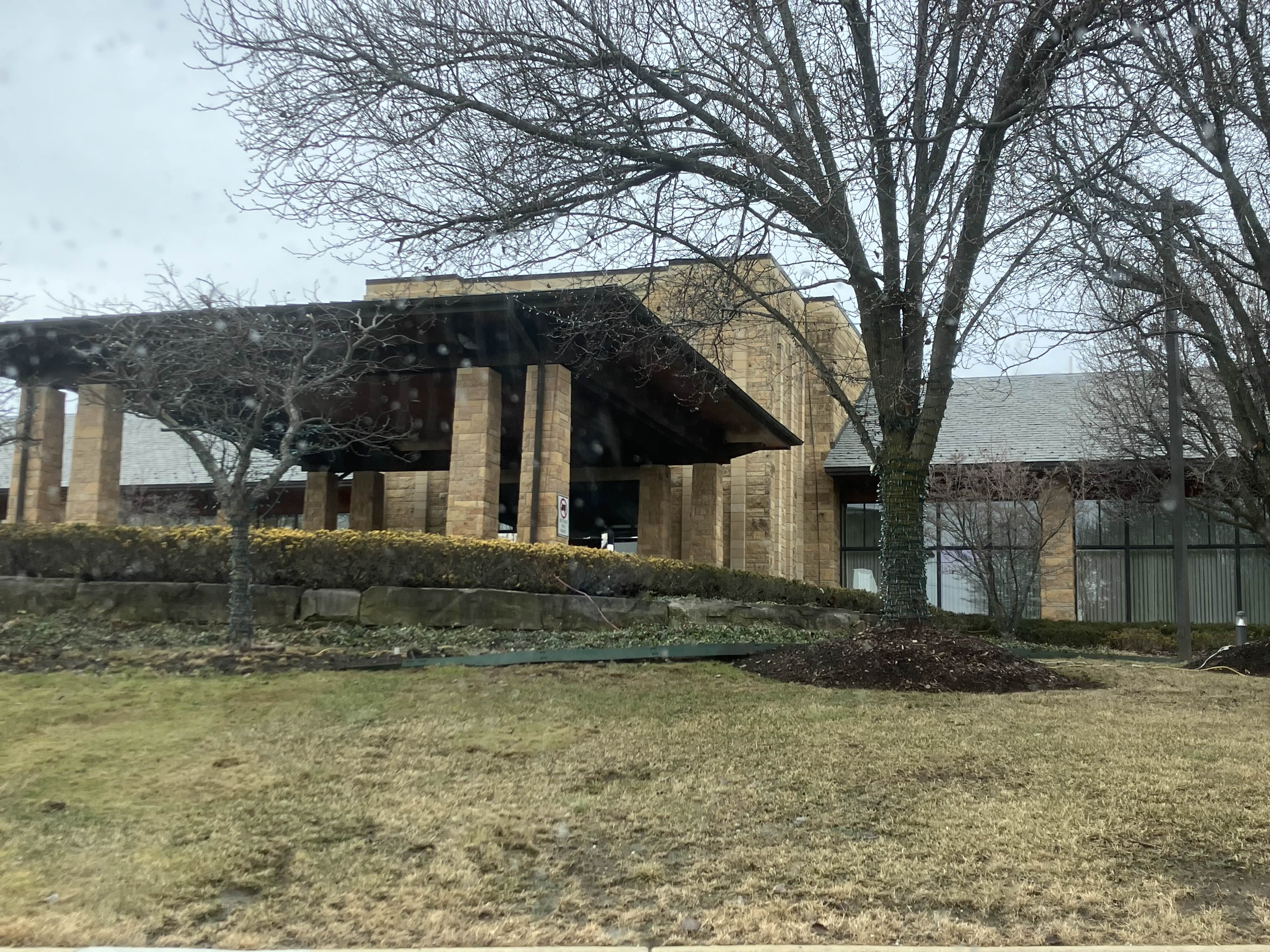
Photo of the Chaldean Cultural Center taken on February 28th, 2025

West Bloomfield also has a large Chaldo-Assyrian population. In 2004 the Chaldean Cultural Center, the largest of its kind in the United States, was established in the township.

As of April 2013, West Bloomfield had the third largest Japanese national population in the state of Michigan, at 1,047.

== Notable people ==
- Rucka Rucka Ali, rapper, radio personality, singer, comedian, and satirist most noted for his song parodies on YouTube
- Noah Arbit, current state representative for this community
- Justin Bartha, actor, most notable for The Hangover Trilogy and the National Treasure series
- Jack Berry, sports journalist for The Detroit News and the Detroit Free Press
- Meryl Davis, Olympic ice dancer who won the gold medal at the 2014 Winter Olympics in Sochi, Russia
- Pamela Eldred, Miss America 1970
- Dan Gheesling, winner of Big Brother 10 and runner-up of Big Brother 14
- Joe Ginsberg, former baseball catcher for the Detroit Tigers
- Adam Grant, psychologist
- Brandon T. Jackson, actor, appears in Tropic Thunder, and Percy Jackson
- Kyle Mack, Olympic snowboarder, who won silver medal in Men's Big Air at Pyeongchang 2018 Winter Olympics
- Dana Nessel, Michigan Attorney General
- Ben Ofeimu, soccer player
- Adetokunbo Ogundeji, outside linebacker for the Atlanta Falcons
- Jesse Palter, modern jazz singer
- Karen Clark Sheard, gospel singer
- Bruce Ableson, social media pioneer
- Donovan Edwards, University of Michigan running back
- Maxwell Hairston, cornerback for the Buffalo Bills
- Jack Kevorkian, Assisted Suicide advocate, lived in West Bloomfield Township from 1994 until his conviction in 1999 in a home owned by his lawyer.

== See also ==
- 1976 West Bloomfield Tornado
- 2026 Temple Israel attack
