= Keego Harbor, Michigan =

- City
- City of Keego Harbor
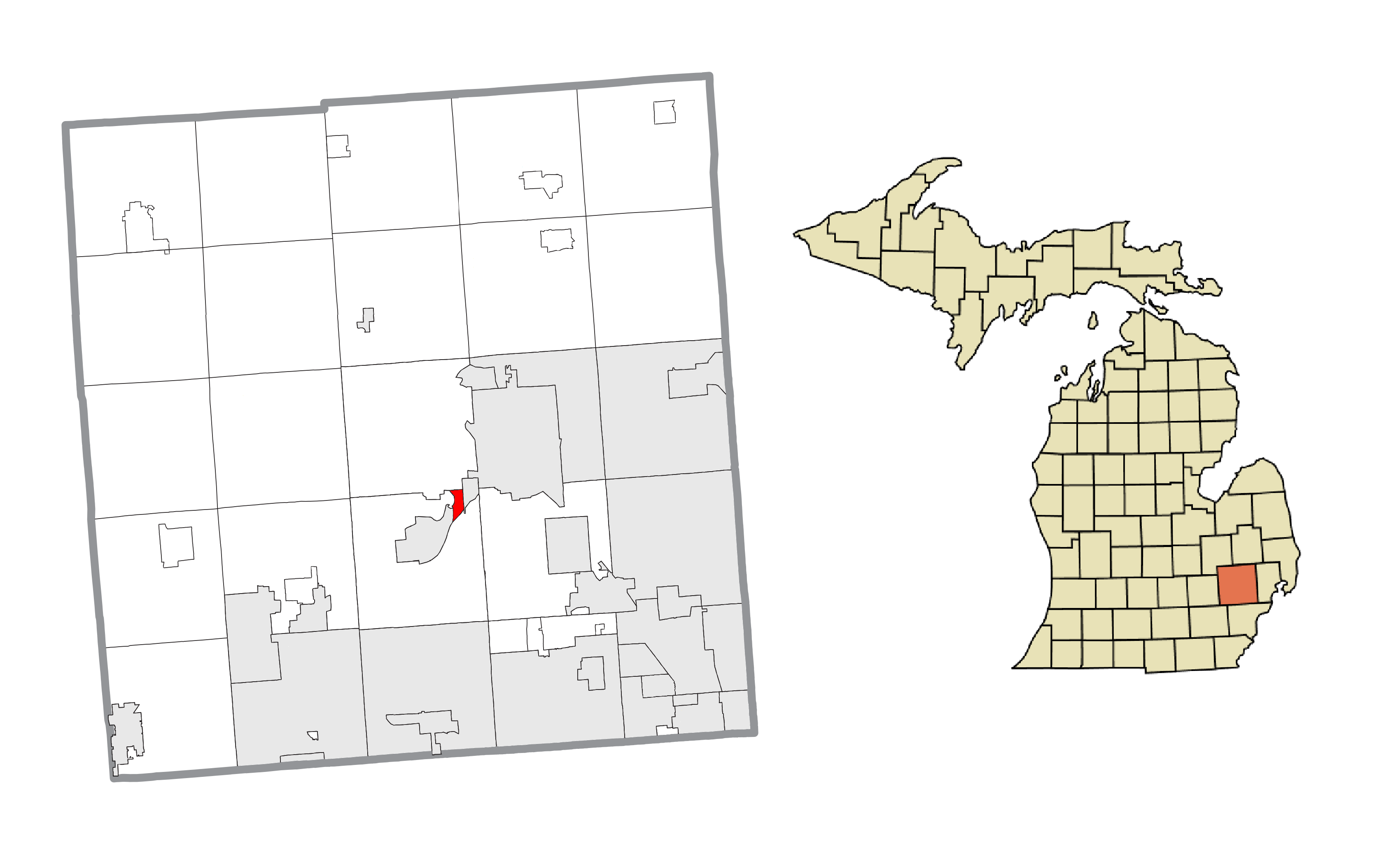
- Location within Oakland County

- Location within the state of Michigan
- Coordinates: 42°36′29″N 83°20′38″W
- Country: United States
- State: Michigan
- County: Oakland
- Incorporated: 1955

Government
  - Type: Council–manager
  - Mayor: Joel Ross
  - Manager: Tammy Neeb

Area
  - City: 0.57 sq mi (1.47 km^{2})
  - Land: 0.49 sq mi (1.28 km^{2})
  - Water: 0.073 sq mi (0.19 km^{2})
- Elevation: 932 ft (284 m)

Population (2020)
  - City: 2,764
  - Density: 5,578.5/sq mi (2,153.87/km^{2})
  - Metro: 4,296,250 (Metro Detroit)
- Time zone: UTC-5 (EST)
  - Summer (DST): UTC-4 (EDT)
- ZIP code(s): 48320
- Area code: 248
- FIPS code: 26-42460
- GNIS feature ID: 0629495
- Website: Official website

Keego Harbor is a city in Oakland County in the U.S. state of Michigan. A northern suburb of Detroit, Keego Harbor is located roughly 27 miles (43.5 km) from downtown Detroit, and about 3 miles (4.8 km) southwest of Pontiac. As of the 2020 census, Keego Harbor had a population of 2,764. With a land area of 0.50 square miles (1.29 km^{2}), Keego Harbor is the third-smallest city by land area in the state of Michigan, after Petersburg and Clarkston.

== History ==
The first non-native settlers to the area arrived between 1825 and 1830. Cass Lake drew many wealthy residents to purchase land along the lake for vacationing. In 1890, a railway line was built through Keego Harbor to connect to Detroit and Pontiac, making the area much more accessible. At the turn of the century, a prominent Pontiac lawyer, Joseph E. Sawyer, purchased and platted land just to the southwest along Orchard Lake. He built a canal to connect the smaller Dollar Lake to Cass Lake and declared the area to be a harbor on the eastern edge of Cass Lake. He named the area Keego, which was a phonetic spelling of the Anishinaabemowin word "giigoonh" meaning "fish." The spelling Keego comes from the Henry Wadsworth Longfellow poem, The Song of Hiawatha. The community was originally part of West Bloomfield Township before incorporating as an independent city in 1955.

== Geography ==
According to the United States Census Bureau, the city has a total area of 0.55 square miles (1.42 km^{2}), of which 0.50 square miles (1.29 km^{2}) is land and 0.05 square miles (0.13 km^{2}) (9.09%) is water.

The small Dollar Lake and canal remain within the city of Keego Harbor. The city is on the eastern shores of Cass Lake and is surrounded by Sylvan Lake on the east, Orchard Lake Village on the southwest, Waterford Township on the north, and West Bloomfield Township on the south and northwest.

== Government ==
=== Federal, state, and county legislators ===
United States House of Representatives
District	Representative	Party	Since
11th	Haley Stevens	Democratic	2023 (Note: Stevens has represented the 11th district since 2019, but the district has only included Keego Harbor since 2023.)

Michigan Senate
District	Senator	Party	Since
13th	Rosemary Bayer	Democratic	2019 (Note: Bayer has represented Keego Harbor since 2019, but has only represented the 13th district since 2023.)

Michigan House of Representatives
District	Representative	Party	Since
20th	Noah Arbit	Democratic	2023

Oakland County Board of Commissioners
District	Commissioner	Party	Since
10	Kirsten Nelson	Democratic	2019

== Demographics ==
Historical population
Census	Pop.	Note	%±
1960	2,761		—
1970	3,092		12.0%
1980	3,083		−0.3%
1990	2,932		−4.9%
2000	2,769		−5.6%
2010	2,970		7.3%
2020	2,764		−6.9%
U.S. Decennial Census

=== 2020 census ===
As of the 2020 census, Keego Harbor had a population of 2,764. The median age was 39.7 years. 18.6% of residents were under the age of 18 and 15.3% of residents were 65 years of age or older. For every 100 females there were 97.6 males, and for every 100 females age 18 and over there were 95.6 males age 18 and over.

100.0% of residents lived in urban areas, while 0.0% lived in rural areas.

There were 1,320 households in Keego Harbor, of which 24.2% had children under the age of 18 living in them. Of all households, 34.1% were married-couple households, 26.0% were households with a male householder and no spouse or partner present, and 32.0% were households with a female householder and no spouse or partner present. About 38.8% of all households were made up of individuals and 13.7% had someone living alone who was 65 years of age or older.

There were 1,478 housing units, of which 10.7% were vacant. The homeowner vacancy rate was 2.0% and the rental vacancy rate was 11.1%.

Racial composition as of the 2020 census
Race	Number	Percent
White	2,206	79.8%
Black or African American	154	5.6%
American Indian and Alaska Native	13	0.5%
Asian	72	2.6%
Native Hawaiian and Other Pacific Islander	1	0.0%
Some other race	92	3.3%
Two or more races	226	8.2%
Hispanic or Latino (of any race)	226	8.2%

=== 2010 census ===
As of the census of 2010, there were 2,970 people, 1,292 households, and 721 families living in the city. The population density was 5,940.0 inhabitants per square mile (2,293.4/km^{2}). There were 1,473 housing units at an average density of 2,946.0 per square mile (1,137.5/km^{2}). The racial makeup of the city was 84.1% White, 6.2% African American, 0.3% Native American, 2.3% Asian, 4.0% from other races, and 3.1% from two or more races. Hispanic or Latino of any race were 10.8% of the population.

There were 1,292 households, of which 32.3% had children under the age of 18 living with them, 36.1% were married couples living together, 14.0% had a female householder with no husband present, 5.7% had a male householder with no wife present, and 44.2% were non-families. 36.1% of all households were made up of individuals, and 7% had someone living alone who was 65 years of age or older. The average household size was 2.30 and the average family size was 3.08.

The median age in the city was 35.6 years. 24.8% of residents were under the age of 18; 7.9% were between the ages of 18 and 24; 33.6% were from 25 to 44; 26.1% were from 45 to 64; and 7.6% were 65 years of age or older. The gender makeup of the city was 50.3% male and 49.7% female.

=== 2000 census ===
As of the census of 2000, there were 2,769 people, 1,223 households, and 664 families living in the city. The population density was 5,388.9 inhabitants per square mile (2,080.7/km^{2}). There were 1,317 housing units at an average density of 2,563.1 per square mile (989.6/km^{2}). The racial makeup of the city was 94.08% White, 0.61% African American, 1.16% Native American, 1.05% Asian, 1.26% from other races, and 1.84% from two or more races. Hispanic or Latino of any race were 4.37% of the population.

There were 1,223 households, out of which 30.2% had children under the age of 18 living with them, 38.1% were married couples living together, 11.7% had a female householder with no husband present, and 45.7% were non-families. 37.4% of all households were made up of individuals, and 5.2% had someone living alone who was 65 years of age or older. The average household size was 2.26 and the average family size was 3.07.

In the city, the population was spread out, with 24.9% under the age of 18, 7.7% from 18 to 24, 41.1% from 25 to 44, 18.7% from 45 to 64, and 7.6% who were 65 years of age or older. The median age was 33 years. For every 100 females, there were 108.5 males. For every 100 females age 18 and over, there were 105.3 males.

The median income for a household in the city was $46,552, and the median income for a family was $49,015. Males had a median income of $37,031 versus $34,038 for females. The per capita income for the city was $26,305. About 5.2% of families and 5.1% of the population were below the poverty line, including 6.0% of those under age 18 and 2.4% of those age 65 or over.

== Education ==
Keego Harbor is within the West Bloomfield School District.
