= Noah Arbit =

American politician (born 1995)

Member of the Michigan House of Representatives from the 20th district
- Incumbent
- Assumed office January 1, 2023
- Preceded by: Matt Koleszar (Note: Before the 2021 redistricting cycle, nearly two-thirds of the territory represented by Noah Arbit was located within Michigan’s 39th House District, held by then-Rep. Ryan Berman (R-Commerce Township), while Rep. Matt Koleszar (D-Plymouth) represented the old 20th District, in Wayne County.)

Personal details
- Born: Noah Jeremy Arbit; September 21, 1995 (age 31) Detroit, Michigan, US
- Party: Democratic
- Education: Wayne State University (BA)
- Website: Campaign website Government website

Noah Jeremy Arbit (born September 21, 1995) is an American politician serving as a member of the Michigan House of Representatives since 2023, representing the 20th district. He is a member of the Democratic Party.

== Early life and education ==
Noah Arbit was born on September 21, 1995, alongside his fraternal twin brother, to parents Edie and Steve Arbit. Arbit was raised with his two brothers in West Bloomfield Township, and attended Bloomfield Hills Schools, including Lone Pine Elementary School, West Hills Middle School, and Andover High School, before completing high school at the Frankel Jewish Academy in 2013.

In 2018, Arbit graduated from Wayne State University with a bachelor's degree in comparative politics and Jewish studies.

== Political career ==
In 2016, Arbit took a semester off college to work for Hillary Clinton’s 2016 presidential campaign, leading the campaign’s organizing efforts in West Bloomfield, Commerce, and Milford townships in central-west Oakland County. He has cited Clinton's loss in the 2016 election as a major turning point in his career, compelling him to shift focus from foreign affairs to local and state politics.

Following his graduation, Arbit worked as a staffer for Gretchen Whitmer’s 2018 gubernatorial campaign in Oakland County, and later, as a fundraiser for the Michigan House Democrats.

Following the 2018 terrorist shooting at the Tree of Life synagogue in Pittsburgh, and a rise in antisemitism nationally, Arbit founded the Michigan Democratic Jewish Caucus. As chair of the Michigan Democratic Jewish Caucus, Arbit was outspoken about the need to combat antisemitism in politics, and the importance of Jews running for office in Michigan. He was named to the Detroit Jewish News' annual "36 Under 36" list in 2020 and 2022.

In January 2021, Arbit was appointed Director of Communications for the Oakland County Prosecutor's Office, serving under Prosecutor Karen McDonald. He organized the Office's first-ever Racial Justice Advisory Council, as well as its first ever Pride celebration.

Arbit attended the 50 States One Israel conference. Arbit has attributed some criticism of the Gaza genocide to antisemitism and introduced legislation to more strongly prosecute antisemitic graffiti as a hate crime amid pro-Palestinian protests in Michigan. He refers to himself as a life-long Zionist.

=== 2022 election ===
On August 2, 2022, backed by high fundraising and endorsements from U.S. Representative Brenda Lawrence, local leaders, and organizations, including the Detroit Free Press, Arbit came first in a three-way Democratic primary for Michigan's 20th House District, defeating West Bloomfield School District board member Ken Ferguson and former legislative staffer James Sklar by nearly 16 percentage points, with 7,180 votes (46.6%) to Ferguson's 4,785 (31%), and Sklar's 3,448 (22%).

On November 8, 2022, Arbit was elected to the Michigan House of Representatives in the 2022 General Election, defeating Republican Party nominee Albert Mansour with 56.6% of the vote to Mansour's 43.4%. Arbit is the youngest openly gay person ever elected to the Michigan Legislature.

On December 4, 2022, Arbit was sworn in as State Representative by Michigan Supreme Court Justice Richard H. Bernstein at the Jewish Community Center in West Bloomfield. U.S. Representative Haley Stevens also participated in Arbit's ceremony.

=== 2024 election ===
Arbit was reelected in 2024, defeating Republican Party nominee Brendan Cowley with 53.2% of the vote to Cowley's 46.8%.

== Personal life ==
Arbit is Jewish; he and his family are congregants at Temple Israel in West Bloomfield. Arbit is also openly gay, and has cited his experiences as a part of the Jewish and LGBT communities as compelling him to get involved in politics, to run for office, and particularly, to focus on strengthening Michigan's hate crime laws.

== Electoral history ==
2024 General Election, Michigan’s 20th House District
Party	Candidate	Votes	%
Democratic	Noah Arbit (incumbent)	31,764	53.23
Republican	Brendan Cowley	27,909	46.77
Total votes		59,673	100%
Democratic hold			

2024 Democratic Primary Election, Michigan’s 20th House District
Party	Candidate	Votes	%
Democratic	Noah Arbit (incumbent)	11,560	100.0

2022 General Election, Michigan’s 20th House District
Party	Candidate	Votes	%
Democratic	Noah Arbit	27,825	56.64
Republican	Albert Mansour	21,302	43.36
Total votes		49,176	100%
Democratic gain from Republican			

2022 Democratic Primary Election, Michigan’s 20th House District
Party	Candidate	Votes	%
Democratic	Noah Arbit	7,180	46.6
Democratic	Ken Ferguson	4,785	31.0
Democratic	James Sklar	3,448	22.4

== See also ==
- Michigan's 20th House District
- Michigan House of Representatives
- 2022 Michigan House of Representatives election
- Michigan Democratic Party
- West Bloomfield, Michigan
