= George F. Montgomery Sr. =

American politician from Michigan

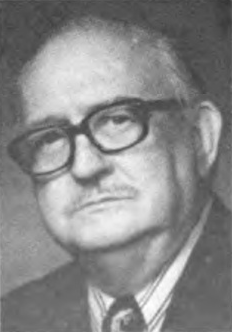

Member of the Michigan House of Representatives
- In office January 1, 1959 – December 31, 1980
- Succeeded by: Teola Pearl Hunter
- Constituency: Wayne County 6th district (1959–1964); 20th district (1965–1972); 5th district (1973–1980)

Member of the Michigan House of Representatives from the Wayne County 1st district
- In office January 1, 1945 – December 31, 1946

Personal details
- Born: January 13, 1909 Ionia, Michigan
- Died: March 10, 1981 Pompano Beach, Florida
- Party: Democratic
- Education: University of Michigan

George F. Montgomery Sr. (1909-1981) was a Democratic member of the Michigan House of Representatives.

Montgomery was born in Ionia, Michigan in 1909 and graduated from the University of Michigan in 1929. He worked as a teacher, was first elected to the House in 1944, and was defeated for re-election in 1946. Montgomery unsuccessfully sought election to the House in 1950, 1954, and 1956; as State Superintendent of Public Instruction in 1947; and to the Senate in 1952. He was a delegate to the 1948 Democratic National Convention.

Montgomery again won election to the House in 1958, serving for just over two decades before retiring in 1980. Montgomery died on March 10, 1981, at his home in Pompano Beach, Florida, and his body lay in state in the House chamber of the Michigan State Capitol. His son, George Jr. also served in the House for three terms with his father.
