= Sylvan Lake, Michigan =

- City
- City of Sylvan Lake
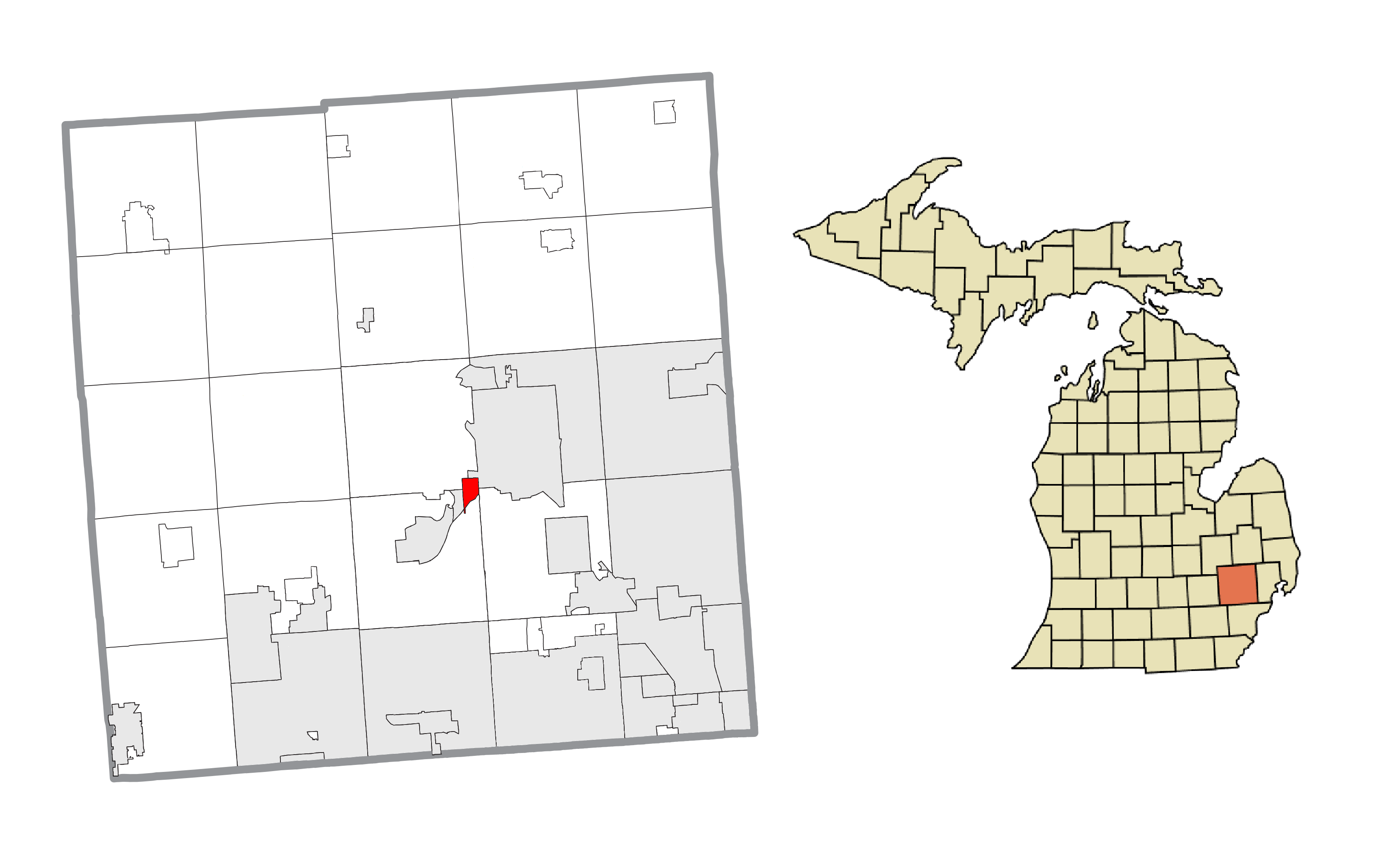
- Location within Oakland County

- Location within the state of Michigan
- Coordinates: 42°36′41″N 83°19′43″W
- Country: United States
- State: Michigan
- County: Oakland
- Settled: 1824
- Incorporated: 1921 (village); 1947 (city)

Government
  - Type: Mayor–council
  - Mayor: Jim Cowper
  - Manager: John Martin

Area
  - City: 0.85 sq mi (2.20 km^{2})
  - Land: 0.52 sq mi (1.35 km^{2})
  - Water: 0.33 sq mi (0.86 km^{2})
- Elevation: 955 ft (291 m)

Population (2020)
  - City: 1,723
  - Density: 3,316.3/sq mi (1,280.42/km^{2})
  - Metro: 4,296,250 (Metro Detroit)
- Time zone: UTC-5 (Eastern (EST))
  - Summer (DST): UTC-4 (EDT)
- ZIP code(s): 48320 (Keego Harbor)
- Area code: 248
- FIPS code: 26-77860
- GNIS feature ID: 1614519
- Website: Official website

Sylvan Lake is a city in Oakland County in the U.S. state of Michigan. A northern suburb of Detroit, Sylvan Lake is located roughly 26 miles (41.8 km) from downtown Detroit, and borders Pontiac to the east. As of the 2020 census, Sylvan Lake had a population of 1,723. With a land area of 0.51 square miles (1.32 km^{2}), Sylvan Lake is the fourth-smallest city by land area in the state after Clarkston, Petersburg, and neighboring Keego Harbor.

== Geography ==
According to the United States Census Bureau, the city has a total area of 0.82 square miles (2.12 km^{2}), of which 0.51 square miles (1.32 km^{2}) is land and 0.31 square miles (0.80 km^{2}) (37.8%) is water.

== Government ==
=== Federal, state, and county legislators ===
United States House of Representatives
District	Representative	Party	Since
11th	Haley Stevens	Democratic	2023 (Note: Stevens has represented the 11th district since 2019, but the district has only included Sylvan Lake since 2023.)

Michigan Senate
District	Senator	Party	Since
13th	Rosemary Bayer	Democratic	2019 (Note: Bayer has represented Sylvan Lake since 2019, but has only represented the 13th district since 2023.)

Michigan House of Representatives
District	Representative	Party	Since
20th	Noah Arbit	Democratic	2023

Oakland County Board of Commissioners
District	Commissioner	Party	Since
10	Kirsten Nelson	Democratic	2019

== Demographics ==
Historical population
Census	Pop.	Note	%±
1930	799		—
1940	1,041		30.3%
1950	1,165		11.9%
1960	2,004		72.0%
1970	2,219		10.7%
1980	1,949		−12.2%
1990	1,884		−3.3%
2000	1,735		−7.9%
2010	1,720		−0.9%
2020	1,723		0.2%
U.S. Decennial Census

=== 2020 census ===
As of the 2020 census, Sylvan Lake had a population of 1,723. The median age was 52.1 years. 12.9% of residents were under the age of 18 and 22.6% of residents were 65 years of age or older. For every 100 females there were 92.3 males, and for every 100 females age 18 and over there were 92.7 males age 18 and over.

100.0% of residents lived in urban areas, while 0.0% lived in rural areas.

There were 867 households in Sylvan Lake, of which 20.0% had children under the age of 18 living in them. Of all households, 42.3% were married-couple households, 19.1% were households with a male householder and no spouse or partner present, and 32.1% were households with a female householder and no spouse or partner present. About 36.2% of all households were made up of individuals and 13.0% had someone living alone who was 65 years of age or older.

There were 908 housing units, of which 4.5% were vacant. The homeowner vacancy rate was 1.0% and the rental vacancy rate was 7.0%.

Racial composition as of the 2020 census
Race	Number	Percent
White	1,534	89.0%
Black or African American	63	3.7%
American Indian and Alaska Native	8	0.5%
Asian	15	0.9%
Native Hawaiian and Other Pacific Islander	1	0.1%
Some other race	6	0.3%
Two or more races	96	5.6%
Hispanic or Latino (of any race)	52	3.0%

=== 2010 census ===
As of the census of 2010, there were 1,720 people, 809 households, and 474 families living in the city. The population density was 3,372.5 inhabitants per square mile (1,302.1/km^{2}). There were 864 housing units at an average density of 1,694.1 per square mile (654.1/km^{2}). The racial makeup of the city was 94.5% White, 2.2% African American, 0.3% Native American, 0.7% Asian, 0.5% from other races, and 1.7% from two or more races. Hispanic or Latino of any race were 1.5% of the population.

There were 809 households, of which 26.9% had children under the age of 18 living with them, 45.9% were married couples living together, 8.7% had a female householder with no husband present, 4.1% had a male householder with no wife present, and 41.4% were non-families. 34.9% of all households were made up of individuals, and 9.5% had someone living alone who was 65 years of age or older. The average household size was 2.13 and the average family size was 2.76.

The median age in the city was 44.8 years. 20.1% of residents were under the age of 18; 4.2% were between the ages of 18 and 24; 26% were from 25 to 44; 33.7% were from 45 to 64; and 16% were 65 years of age or older. The gender makeup of the city was 49.3% male and 50.7% female.

=== 2000 census ===
As of the census of 2000, there were 1,735 people, 826 households, and 465 families living in the city. The population density was 3,305.8 inhabitants per square mile (1,276.4/km^{2}). There were 855 housing units at an average density of 1,629.1 per square mile (629.0/km^{2}). The racial makeup of the city was 95.39% White, 1.21% African American, 0.46% Native American, 0.81% Asian, and 2.13% from two or more races. Hispanic or Latino of any race were 1.10% of the population.

There were 826 households, out of which 20.5% had children under the age of 18 living with them, 46.4% were married couples living together, 6.7% had a female householder with no husband present, and 43.7% were non-families. 36.6% of all households were made up of individuals, and 9.8% had someone living alone who was 65 years of age or older. The average household size was 2.09 and the average family size was 2.76.

In the city, the population was spread out, with 18.0% under the age of 18, 4.4% from 18 to 24, 36.9% from 25 to 44, 25.8% from 45 to 64, and 14.9% who were 65 years of age or older. The median age was 40 years. For every 100 females, there were 96.5 males. For every 100 females age 18 and over, there were 94.7 males.

The median income for a household in the city was $71,875, and the median income for a family was $90,931. Males had a median income of $70,526 versus $45,341 for females. The per capita income for the city was $48,744. About 0.6% of families and 2.0% of the population were below the poverty line, including none of those under age 18 and 1.8% of those age 65 or over.

== Education ==
A portion is in the Pontiac School District.

About 10% of Sylvan Lake is within the West Bloomfield School District.
