= Solomon Schechter School of Manhattan =

Schechter Manhattan

Location
- New York City; 40°47′43″N 73°57′56″W

Information
- Type: Private, Day
- Religious affiliations: Jewish, Progressive
- Established: 1995
- Head of school: Gary Pretsfelder
- Grades: K-8
- Enrollment: 140
- Campus: Urban
- Colors: Blue and White
- Website: www.schechtermanhattan.org

Schechter Manhattan was a K-8 independent Jewish day school located on the Upper West Side of Manhattan, New York City. The school adheres to a progressive or constructivist educational philosophy, which espouses the value of experiential learning and self-reflection.

== History ==
Schechter Manhattan opened in 1996, with S. Lorch serving as its founding head of school. Its first eighth-grade class graduated in June 2006. Alumni have subsequently attended independent, Jewish, and public secondary schools in New York City and the surrounding area.

The elementary division (K-5) and the middle school division (6–8) are each led by a Division Head.

Schechter Manhattan is a member of the Independent Schools Association of Greater New York (ISAAGNY). Additionally, the school is a full member of New York State Association of Independent Schools (NYSAIS). The school is governed by a board of trustees and advised by both an Education Committee and a Rabbinic Advisory Committee.

In January 2011, the entire school moved into a new building at 805 Columbus Avenue. Prior to that time, the kindergarten and first-grade classes met at the Park Avenue Synagogue and the rest of the school, grades 2–8, was located on the Upper West Side at 15 West 86th Street, in the building of the Society for the Advancement of Judaism.

The school announced its closure effective June 30, 2024, citing sharply declining enrollment.
