= West Bloomfield High School =

Public high school in West Bloomfield, Michigan

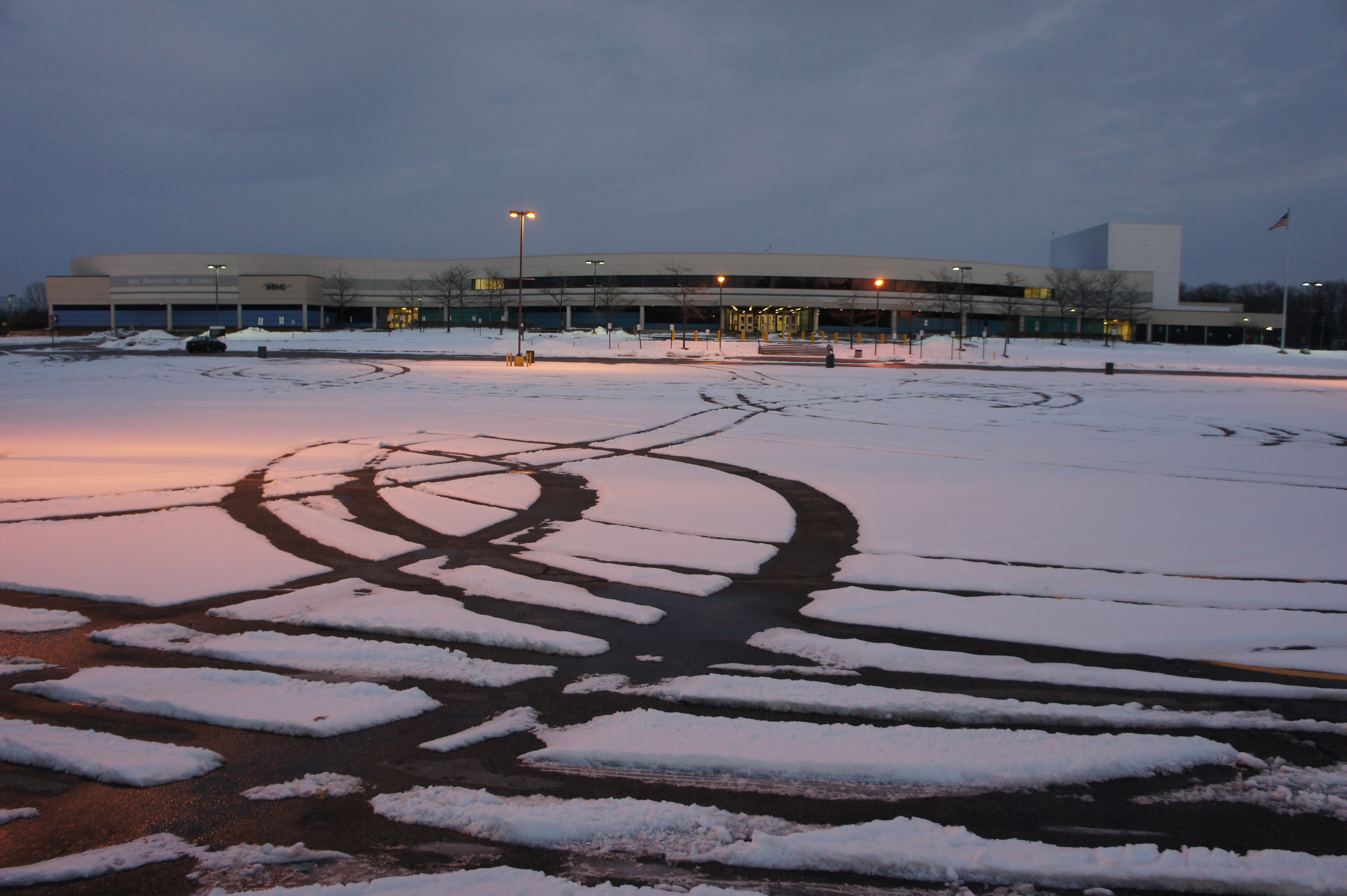

Location
- 4925 Orchard Lake Road; West Bloomfield, Michigan 48323; United States; 42°33′58″N 83°21′31″W

Information
- Type: Public high school
- School district: West Bloomfield School District
- Superintendent: Dania Bazzi
- Principal: Eric Pace
- Staff: 94.01 (FTE)
- Enrollment: 2,001 (2023–24)
- Student to teacher ratio: 19.26
- Colors: Forest green White
- Nickname: Lakers
- Newspaper: Spectrum
- Website: www.wbsd.org/west-bloomfield-high-school

Student assessments
- 2021–22 school year Change vs. prior year

M-STEP 11th grade proficiency rates (Science / Social Studies)
- Advanced %: 11.0 / 6.2
- Proficient %: 19.4 / 19.5
- PR. Proficient %: 19.1 / 54.1
- Not Proficient %: 50.5 / 20.2

Average test scores
- SAT Total: 974.0 (▼ −41.1)

West Bloomfield High School is a public high school in West Bloomfield, Michigan, United States. The school is the only public high school in the West Bloomfield School District. Enrollment for the 2010–2011 school year was about 1900. West Bloomfield High School was previously located in the Abbott Middle School building, which opened on January 31, 1955, with an enrollment of 406. From fall 1968 through spring 1971, the school was temporarily located at the site of the current West Bloomfield Middle School. The current building was built in 1971. West Bloomfield High School began offering the Advanced Placement International Diploma with the class of 2011. In addition, it established additional Advanced Placement courses starting the 2010–2011 school year.

The school has been recognized by Newsweek as being in the top 6% of U.S. public high schools.

== Building ==
In 1971 the district responded to growing enrollment by building a new high school. The large, single-story building was designed in a U-shape around a courtyard that faced Orchard Lake Road. Linn Smith Associates was the architect. In the late 1990s, the courtyard was enclosed by a two-story addition that gave the school its curved front facade. In 2000, the media center was completely rebuilt with an emphasis on technology. Small additions were built throughout the 2000s.

Between 1955 and 1966, WBHS was housed in the building that is currently Roosevelt Elementary. Between fall 1967 and spring 1971, WBHS occupied the building that previously housed Orchard Lake Middle School.

== Instructional Project Design program ==
The school is known for its Instructional Project Design course, based on the philosophy that students must be allowed a say in designing tools that they will use. The tools in question are internet forums and services created for a variety of educational and civic clients. The program is run by University of Michigan—Flint.

The program was responsible for the creation of "Warren Easton in Exile," a noted website designed to virtually "rebuild" a high school in New Orleans that was shut down after being damaged by Hurricane Katrina in 2005. Former projects also include the Michigan Student Caucus (formerly the Michigan Youth Caucus), a partnership with the Michigan State House Special Commission on Civic Engagement.

The 2006–2007 project for IPD was a project with the Trauma Burn Center at the University of Michigan Hospital in Ann Arbor. It focuses on five main areas: entertainment, school re-entry, communication, hospital resource center, and education/prevention. There were also plans to integrate the website with the Ann Arbor Hands-On Museum.

== Music department ==
The West Bloomfield High School Marching Band placed fourth at the MCBA state championship in Flight I in 2011. The WB Marching Band also placed fourth in Flight I in 2010, third in Flight I in 2007, second in Flight I in 2009, and first in Flight I in 2008, the first time the band has received the state championship in the school's history. Nationally, the band was a Bands of America Grand National Semifinalist from 2008–2010 at the Bands of America Grand National Championships. The band was also a regional finalist at the BOA Ypsilanti Regional in 2007. In 2009 and 2010, the band was named Class AAA Champion in BOA Pontiac Regionals. The band shares staff members with many drum corps including Carolina Crown and Phantom Regiment, as well as top WGI percussion groups such as Rhythm X, Eastside Fury, and Motor City Percussion. The West Bloomfield Bands also include the Symphonic Winds, Symphony Band, Concert Band, and Jazz Band.

The WBHS Winter Drumline were the 2014 MCGC Scholastic A State Champions. The group also placed second in Scholastic A at the MCGC state championship in 2007 and 2008, third in Scholastic A in 2009, and first in Scholastic Open in 2010, which marked the unit's first state title. The Winter Drumline was also a Scholastic World Class Finalist at WGI World Championships in 2012. They were the 2008 WGI Scholastic A Troy Regional Champions and the 2010 WGI Scholastic Open Troy Regional Champions.

The WBHS Winter Guard were the 2014 MCGC Scholastic AA State Champions. The group also placed second in AA at the 2008 MCGC state championship and second in Michigan A at the 2006 MCGC State Championship. The Winter Guard placed sixth in Scholastic A in 2009 and was a WGI Ferndale Regional Finalist.

The West Bloomfield High School orchestra program has two orchestras: the concert orchestra (primarily freshmen and sophomores) and the symphony orchestra (primarily juniors and seniors). The orchestral program has won numerous awards at the Michigan Band and Orchestra Music Festivals, including first and second division ratings at both the district and state festivals. The orchestra department has also competed in music festivals outside the state, where they received first place and Best Overall Orchestra.

== Notable alumni ==
- Justin Bartha (1996), actor
- Melrose Bickerstaff (2001), model and runner-up on America's Next Top Model
- Tyrone Broden (2019), NFL wide receiver for the Seattle Seahawks
- Victoria Chang (1988), poet and writer
- Ryan Destiny, actress, singer
- Maxwell Hairston (2021), NFL cornerback for the Buffalo Bills
- Donovan Edwards (2021), University of Michigan running back
- Sherilyn Fenn, actress
- Javon Foster (2018), offensive tackle for the Jacksonville Jaguars
- Adam Grant, professor of organizational psychology at the Wharton School of the University of Pennsylvania
- C.J. Harris (2020), quarterback for the California Golden Bears
- Mike Hartman, NHL forward for the Buffalo Sabres
- Brandon T. Jackson, actor in Roll Bounce (2005), The Brandon T. Jackson Show (2006), and the blockbuster Tropic Thunder (2008)
- Trishton Jackson (2016), NFL wide receiver for the Arizona Cardinals
- Matthew Judon (2010), NFL linebacker for the Miami Dolphins
- Todd Krumm, NFL safety for the Chicago Bears
- Lisa Brown-Miller, Olympic women's hockey player
- Semaj Morgan (2023), wide receiver for the Michigan Wolverines
- Tre Mosley (2019), NFL wide receiver for the Cincinnati Bengals
- Dana Nessel (1987), 54th Attorney General of Michigan
- Makari Paige (2020), defensive back for the Michigan Wolverines
- Rucka Rucka Ali, controversial American parody YouTuber and musician
- David Schechter (1989), CBS News journalist, host of On The Dot with David Schechter
- Sean Hickey (1988) Award-winning composer, music executive
