= Matt Koleszar =

American politician (born 1981)

Member of the Michigan House of Representatives
- Incumbent
- Assumed office January 1, 2019
- Preceded by: Redistricted (District 22), Jeff Noble (District 20)
- Succeeded by: Lisa McIntyre (elect)
- Constituency: 22nd district (2023–present); 20th district (2019–2022)

Personal details
- Born: September 21, 1981 (age 45) Royal Oak, Michigan, U.S.
- Party: Democratic
- Spouse: Kimberly Bush-Koleszar
- Education: Saginaw Valley State University (BA); Eastern Michigan University (MA)
- Occupation: Teacher
- Website: Matt for Michigan

Matt Koleszar (born September 21, 1981) is an American politician serving as a member of the Michigan House of Representatives since 2019, currently representing the 22nd district. He is a member of the Democratic Party.

== Early life and education ==
Koleszar was born in Royal Oak. He earned a Bachelor of Arts degree in secondary education with a focus on social studies and English from Saginaw Valley State University in 2006, and a Master of Arts degree in English studies for teachers from Eastern Michigan University in 2011.

== Career ==
Before his election as a state representative, Koleszar had taught middle school and high school social studies and English for 12 years in the Airport Community School District in Carleton, coached cross country and baseball, and served as president of the Airport Education Association.

=== Michigan House of Representatives ===
Koleszar served as assistant Democratic leader in 2019 and 2020, and as Democratic whip in 2021 and 2022. He has introduced legislation on issues ranging from air quality to school libraries, as well as tuition assistance for the children of fallen Police Officers and Firefighters. He has served on the House committees for education, higher education, health policy, education policy, elections and ethics, labor, and school aid.

Following redistricting, Koleszar ran in the 22nd district in 2022, winning reelection. After the Democrats won control of the state legislature in the 2022 elections, he was appointed chair of the education committee.

Koleszar was reelected in 2024.

== Electoral history ==
Election 2018
Party	Candidate	Vote	Percentage
Democratic	Matt Koleszar	24,797	51.41%
Republican	Jeff Noble (Incumbent)	23,430	48.6%

Election 2020
Party	Candidate	Vote	Percentage
Democratic	Matt Koleszar (Incumbent)	33,034	55.1%
Republican	John Lacny	26,931	44.9%

Election 2022
Party	Candidate	Vote	Percentage
Democratic	Matt Koleszar (Incumbent)	28,051	54.18%
Republican	Cathryn Neracher	23,360	45.7%

== Personal life ==
Koleszar is married to Kimberly Bush-Koleszar.

Political offices
Preceded by Jeff Noble	Michigan Representatives; 20th District; 2019–present	Succeeded by Incumbent
