= Prakash Nair =

School architect

- Occupation: School architect
- Known for: Advocate for the Learning Community model in schools

Prakash Nair is an American school architect, entrepreneur, writer, and public speaker.

Nair is the founding president and CEO of Education Design International (EDI) and a former founding president of Fielding Nair International (FNI). Nair's projects have won industry design awards for excellence, including the James D. MacConnell Award — the highest award conferred by the Association for Learning Environments, A4LE — for Reece High School in Tasmania, Australia (2003).

Nair has written about school design and co-authored three books: Blueprint for Tomorrow: Redesigning Schools for Student-Centered Learning, Learning by Design: Live Play Engage Create, and The Language of School Design: Design Patterns for 21st Century Schools. His opinion on educational design issues has been sought by news media and by boards of education.

== Works ==
- Nair, Prakash (October 1, 2014). Blueprint for Tomorrow: Redesigning Schools for Student-Centered Learning. Harvard Education Press. ISBN 978-1612507040.
- Prakash Nair; Roni Zimmer Doctori; Richard F. Elmore (April 15, 2019). Learning by Design: Live Play Engage Create. Education Design Architects. ISBN 978-0976267065.
- Prakash Nair; Randall Fielding (September 30, 2009). The Language of School Design: Design Patterns for 21st Century Schools (3rd ed.). Designshare, Inc. ISBN 978-0976267003.
