= Jewish day school =

Modern Jewish educational institution

A Jewish day school is a modern Jewish educational institution that is designed to provide children with both a Jewish and a secular education in one school on a full-time basis. The term "day school" is used to differentiate schools attended during the day from part-time weekend schools as well as secular or religious "boarding school" equivalents where the students live full-time as well as study. The substance of the Jewish component varies from school to school, community to community, and usually depends on the Jewish denominations of the schools' founders. While some schools may stress Judaism and Torah study others may focus more on Jewish history, Hebrew language, Yiddish language, Jewish culture, and Zionism. This is in addition to secular content that is the same as public school curricula.

== Types ==
Not all Jewish day schools are the same. While they may all teach Jewish studies or various parts of Torah and Tanakh, these studies may be taught from various points of view depending on each school's educational policies, the board of directors in charge, and the nature and make-up of both the student body and the professional teaching staff.

The majority of Jewish day schools teach classes between Kindergarten and 8th grade. Some day schools may be entirely religious, and indeed most yeshivas (Orthodox schools that emphasize Talmudic studies) are day schools. However, the traditional yeshivas are different institutions when compared to Modern Orthodox Jewish day schools. While traditional Haredi and Hasidic yeshivas are only for boys, with girls attending Beis Yaakov schools, they do not encourage their students to plan for college education and professional careers. On the other hand, Modern Orthodox day schools are often coeducational and stress the secular component of the curriculum, as many parents wish to have their children educated at a high enough level to be admitted to college and university in order to train for a profession.

The Solomon Schechter Day Schools in the United States and Canada teach Judaism from the perspective of Conservative Judaism, and there are schools that similarly teach Judaism from a Reform or even nondenominational perspective. These latter are usually called pluralist day schools, and many belong to RAVSAK, a network of pluralist day schools.

Jewish day schools may be entirely secular. One of the largest day schools in the world is the King David School system in Johannesburg, South Africa, that educated thousands of Jewish students, stressing the teaching of Hebrew language and Zionism, since the majority of students and the teachers are not fully religiously observant.

In many Jewish day schools, students are taught to read, speak, and understand the Hebrew language. Usually beginning in grade school, students have intensive Hebrew studies. This is challenging for many students, since Hebrew uses different letters and a different script than English, French, and other languages that use the Latin alphabet.

== History ==
The first Jewish day school in North America was established in 1731 at the Congregation Shearith Israel. German Jewish immigrants who arrived in the 19th century established day schools in their own communities, but this movement to establish Jewish day schools had lost momentum by the 1870s. This was caused by the perception among American Jews that not sending your children to public schools was "un-American". Most American Jewish day schools founded in the late 19th and early 20th century were Orthodox and Ultra Orthodox institutions founded by recent immigrants, modelled after Eastern European cheders, which emphasized religious learning over general studies. During the interwar period of the 1920s and 1930s, a movement began in the United States to create modernized Jewish day schools which were more secular and emphasized general studies alongside Jewish learning, as well as Liberal Jewish schools. Between 1917 and 1939, over 23 Jewish day schools were founded in the New York Metropolitan area.

After The Holocaust and the aftermath of World War II, the interest in Jewish day schools increased dramatically. In 1944, Torah Umesorah was founded to expand the number of Jewish day schools, especially beyond those already found in New York City. Day schools were established in great numbers in the United States and in other Western countries such as Canada, England, South Africa, Australia, and in South America. In the United States the dislike for, and decline of, the old-fashioned Talmud Torahs and a disenchantment with public schools led to a push for the formation of full-time all-day dual-curriculum schools. The Talmud Torah system of afternoon schools was deemed "failing to transmit Yiddishkeit in a compelling manner to students who arrived tired in the afternoons and were constantly subjected to assimilationist influences in American culture."

White flight, caused by the Desegregation of American schools, also led to increasing numbers of Jewish day schools as parents removed their children from public schools.

=== Enrollment ===
In 1960, approximately 60,000 children in the United States, 10% of the school age Jewish population, attended Jewish day schools. By 2014, there were 861 Jewish day schools in the United States, with an enrollment of 255,000 children. Chabad day schools made up 9 percent of all US Jewish day schools, but have enrolled only 5 percent of students attending such schools.

A 2018-2019 census by the Avi Chai Foundation found 292,172 students attending 906 Jewish day schools. Within the network of 305 Jewish day schools that are part of the Prizmah organization, enrollment increased from 94,008 students in the 2021-2022 school year to approximately 101,041 students in 2025-2026, an increase of 7,000 students, or 7.5%. The network includes nondenominational, Orthodox and Conservative Jewish schools, and the growth was noted across the different school types.

== See also ==
- Hebrew school
- Jewish education
- Private school
- Religious education
- Religious school
- Talmud Torah
- Yeshiva
