= Brandon School =

Brandon Schools may refer to:

- Brandon School, a school in California's Goleta Union School District
- Brandon Zone, a zone of Mississippi's Rankin County School District
  - Brandon High School (Grades 9-12)
  - Brandon Middle School (Grades 6-8)
  - Brandon Elementary School (Grades 3-5)
- Brandon School District in Minnesota
- Brandon Valley School District in South Dakota
- Brandon School District in Michigan
  - Brandon High School (Michigan)
- Rosendale-Brandon School District in Wisconsin
- Brandon School Division is a school division in Brandon, Manitoba, Canada
- Brandon High School (Florida) of Brandon, Hillsborough County, Florida
- Brandon Gate Public School of Peel District School Board
