= Brandon Township, Michigan =

- Charter township
- Charter Township of Brandon
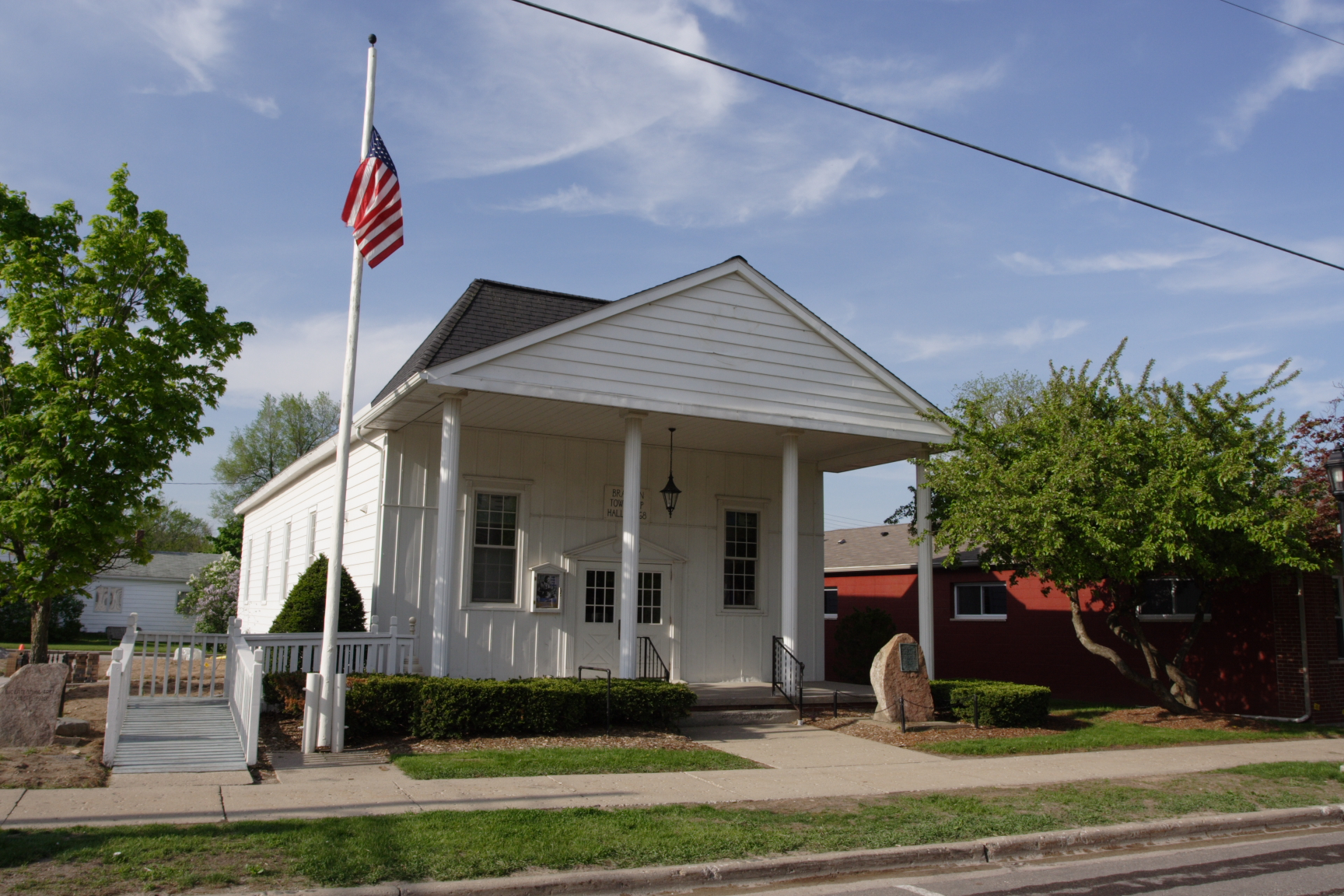
- Brandon Township Hall

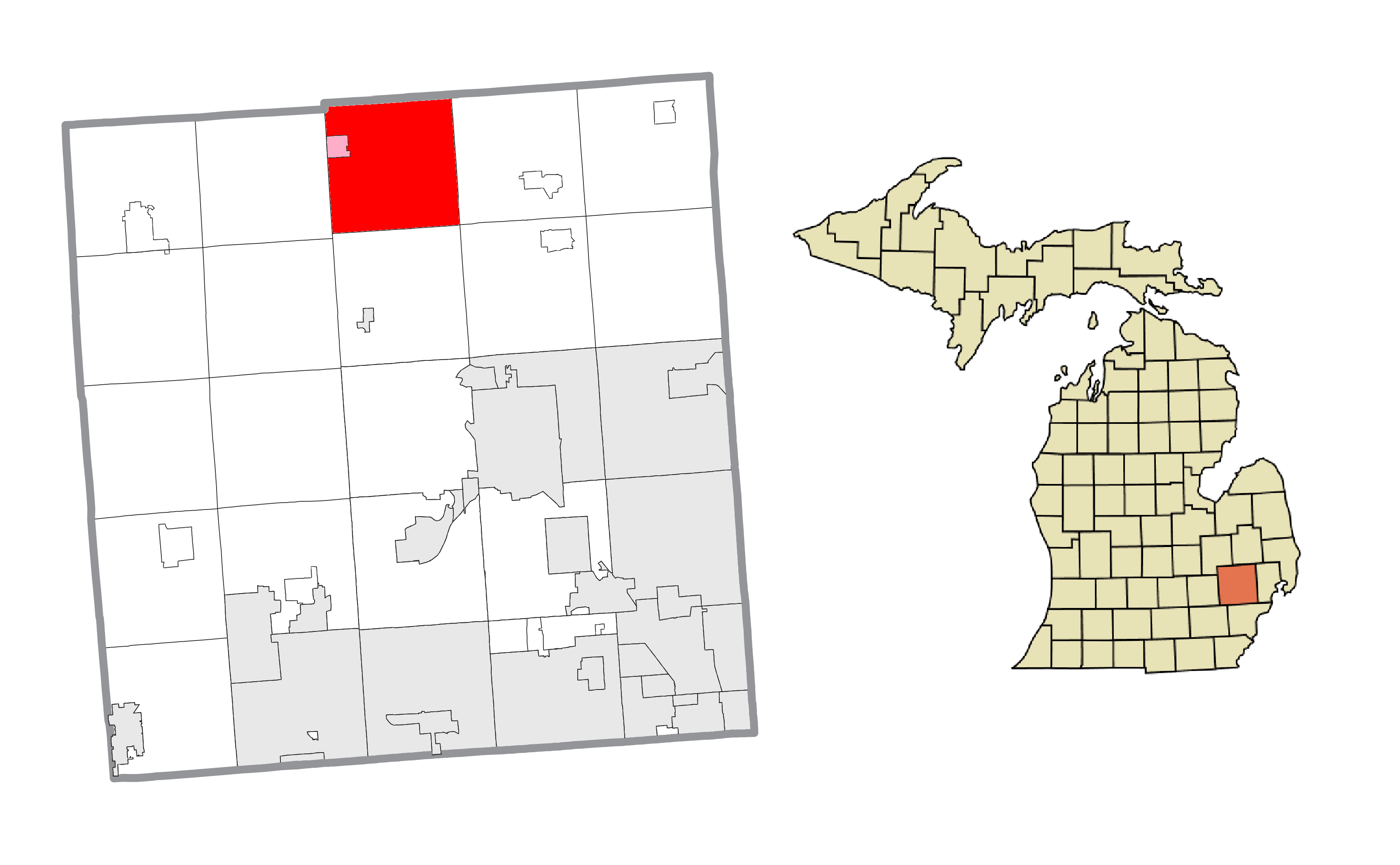
- Location within Oakland County (red) and the administered village of Ortonville (pink)

- Location within the state of Michigan
- Coordinates: 42°51′08″N 83°26′35″W
- Country: United States
- State: Michigan
- County: Oakland
- Established: 1837

Government
  - Supervisor: Jayson Rumble
  - Clerk: Roselyn Blair

Area
  - Charter township: 35.98 sq mi (93.2 km^{2})
  - Land: 35.11 sq mi (90.9 km^{2})
  - Water: 0.87 sq mi (2.3 km^{2})
- Elevation: 1,037 ft (316 m)

Population (2020)
  - Charter township: 15,384
  - Density: 438.2/sq mi (169.2/km^{2})
  - Metro: 4,296,250 (Metro Detroit)
- Time zone: UTC-5 (EST)
  - Summer (DST): UTC-4 (EDT)
- ZIP code(s): 48348 (Clarkston); 48371 (Oxford); 48462 (Ortonville)
- Area codes: 248 and 810
- FIPS code: 26-10040
- GNIS feature ID: 1625971
- Website: Official website

Brandon Charter Township is a charter township of Oakland County in the U.S. state of Michigan. The population was 15,384 at the 2020 census.

As a northern suburb of Metro Detroit, Brandon Township is about 30 miles (48.3 km) north of the city of Detroit and about 20 miles (32.2 km) southeast of Flint. The village of Ortonville is located within the township.

== History ==
The Township of Brandon was created in 1837, named in honor of the settlers of the Town of Brandon, Vermont, whose descendants had migrated to this area of Michigan. The Charter Township of Brandon was formed in the 20th century.

== Communities ==
- Brandon Gardens is located on M-15/Ortonville Road and Glass Road (42°49′32″N 83°26′37″W Elevation: 971 ft./296 m.).
- Oakwood straddles the eastern border with Oxford Township at Baldwin and Oakwood Roads (42°52′03″N 83°20′12″W Elevation: 1099 ft./335 m.).
- Ortonville is a village located within the township.
- Perry Lake Heights is located on Perry Lake west of Perry Lake Road (42°49′40″N 83°24′04″W Elevation: 1030 ft./314 m.).

== Geography ==
According to the United States Census Bureau, the township has a total area of 35.98 square miles (93.19 km^{2}). 35.11 square miles (90.93 km^{2}) of it is land and 0.87 square miles (2.25 km^{2}) (2.42%) is water.

== Demographics ==
As of the census of 2000, there were 14,765 people, 5,012 households, and 4,039 families residing in the township. The population density was 421.1 inhabitants per square mile (162.6/km^{2}). There were 5,290 housing units at an average density of 150.9 per square mile (58.3/km^{2}). The racial makeup of the township was 97.58% White, 0.40% African American, 0.24% Native American, 0.36% Asian, 0.01% Pacific Islander, 0.39% from other races, and 1.02% from two or more races. Hispanic or Latino of any race were 1.59% of the population.

There were 5,012 households, out of which 45.0% had children under the age of 18 living with them, 67.8% were married couples living together, 8.8% had a female householder with no husband present, and 19.4% were non-families. 15.0% of all households were made up of individuals, and 3.9% had someone living alone who was 65 years of age or older. The average household size was 2.92 and the average family size was 3.25.

In the township the population was spread out, with 30.6% under the age of 18, 6.6% from 18 to 24, 35.2% from 25 to 44, 22.0% from 45 to 64, and 5.5% who were 65 years of age or older. The median age was 35 years. For every 100 females, there were 100.3 males. For every 100 females age 18 and over, there were 99.4 males.

The median income for a household in the township was $66,458, and the median income for a family was $70,359. Males had a median income of $52,419 versus $32,068 for females. The per capita income for the township was $25,011. About 3.0% of families and 4.4% of the population were below the poverty line, including 4.8% of those under age 18 and 8.7% of those age 65 or over.

== Education ==
Most of Brandon Township is in Brandon School District, while a portion to the east is in Oxford Community Schools. The respective zoned high schools are Brandon High School, and Oxford High School.
