= Holly Area Schools =

School district in Michigan, United States

Address
- 6161 E. Holly Road Holly, Oakland, Michigan, 48442; United States

District information
- Grades: PreK–12
- Superintendent: Scott Roper
- Schools: 6
- Budget: $64,994,000 2022-2023 expenditures
- NCES District ID: 2618450

Students and staff
- Enrollment: 3,157 (2024-2025)
- Teachers: 190.14 FTE (2024-2025)
- Staff: 468.03 FTE (2024-2025)
- Student–teacher ratio: 16.6 (2024-2025)

Other information
- Website: www.hask12.org

Holly Area Schools is a public school district in Oakland County, Michigan. It serves Holly and the parts of the townships of Groveland, Holly, Rose, Springfield, and White Lake.

== History ==
Holly High School's first yearbook was published in 1906.

The current high school, built in 1999 in Holly Township, replaced a high school building that had been built at 920 Baird Street in 1958. Prior to that, the high school used a 1913 building at 111 College Street.

On June 29, 1995, an arson fire caused $2 million in damage to one wing of the 1958 building. The wing was demolished and rebuilt. Portable classrooms were used until the building was repaired.

When the 1999 high school was built, the former high school was named the Karl Richter Campus, an administration and multipurpose building. It was torn down in 2024 and a new middle school was built on the site. It is scheduled to open in fall 2025.

== Schools ==
Schools in Holly Area School District
| School | Address | Notes |
|---|---|---|
| Davisburg Elementary | 12003 Davisburg Road, Davisburg | Grades K-5 |
| Holly Elementary | 801 East Maple Street, Holly | Grades K-5 |
| Holly High School | 6161 E. Holly Rd., Holly | Grades 9-12 |
| Holly Middle School | 14470 N. Holly Rd., Holly | Grades 6-8 |
| Patterson Elementary | 3231 Grange Hall Rd., Holly | Grades K-5 |
| Rose Pioneer Elementary | 7110 Milford Rd, Holly | Grades K-5 |
