= Holly High School =

Public high school in Holly, Michigan

Location
- 6161 East Holly Road; Holly, Oakland County, Michigan 48442; United States; 42.7942°N 83.5848°W

Information
- Type: Public Secondary
- Motto: " Dream it, Believe it, Achieve it "
- Established: 1896
- School district: Holly Area Schools
- CEEB code: 231980
- Principal: Melissa Wachowski
- Teaching staff: 51.49 (FTE)
- Grades: 9 - 12
- Enrollment: 1,001 (2024-2025)
- Student to teacher ratio: 19.44
- Colors: Red and white
- Athletics conference: Flint Metro League
- Mascot: Bronchos
- Website: www.hask12.org/schools/holly-high-school/

Student assessments
- 2021–22 school year Change vs. prior year

M-STEP 11th grade proficiency rates (Science / Social Studies)
- Advanced %: 24.9 / 12.0
- Proficient %: 29.5 / 25.7
- PR. Proficient %: 18.1 / 56.5
- Not Proficient %: 27.5 / 5.8

Average test scores
- SAT Total: 980.6 (▲ +11.8)

Holly High School (HHS) is a public high school for grades 9–12 located in Holly, Michigan. It provides secondary education for students living in Holly, Davisburg, Springfield Township, Rose Township, and White Lake Township. Its official mascot is the Broncho and its colors are red, white, and grey. In 1952, Holly High School opted to change the spelling of its mascot from Bronco to Broncho since the spelling was commonly used. Holly High School is the only high school in the Holly Area Schools District.

The current high school, built in 1999 in Holly Township, Michigan, replaced a high school building that had been built at 920 Baird Street in 1958. The 1958 building had replaced a 1910s school building on College Street, today the site of a church.

On June 29, 1995, an arson fire caused $2 million in damage to one wing of the 1958 building. The wing was demolished and rebuilt. Portable classrooms were used until the building was repaired.

When the 1999 high school was built, the former high school was named the Karl Richter Campus and housed various district programs. It was demolished in 2024.

In recent years, Holly High School has taken advantage of school closures to invite displaced students of closed schools to attend HHS in order for their families to relocate to the Holly area. Because of this HHS has welcomed former students of Flint Central, Pontiac Central and, most recently, Flint Northern High School.

== Performing arts ==
The Holly High School band program consists of marching band and color guard during the fall season and concert/symphony band during the winter and spring seasons. The Holly High School Main Street Show Choir is also active and performs year-round, as does the Holly High School Concert Choir.

== Notable alumni ==
- Andrew Anderson, professional bowler.
- Jim Ray, former Major League Baseball pitcher for Houston Astros and Detroit Tigers.
- First Lt. Karl W. Richter, U.S. Air Force, "At the age of 23, on Sept. 21, 1966, Richter became the youngest American pilot in Southeast Asia to shoot down a Communist Mig 17."
- Roland (Rollie) C. Harmes, Jr. (1957) Former Director of the Michigan Department of Natural Resources, honored by Oakland County Commissioners Proclamation (2023) in recognition of his dedication to natural resource preservation, spanning four decades with the MDNR.
