= Brandon School District =

School district in Michigan

Address
- 1025 S Ortonville Road Ortonville, Oakland, Michigan; United States

District information
- Type: Public
- Grades: PreK-12
- Superintendent: Carly Stone
- Schools: 5
- Budget: US$39,146,000 (2022-2023)
- NCES District ID: 2606570

Students and staff
- Students: 2,032 (2024-2025)
- Teachers: 126.15 FTE (2024-2025)
- Staff: 321.94 FTE (2024-2025)
- Student–teacher ratio: 16.11 (2024-2025)

Other information
- Website: brandonschooldistrict.org

Brandon School District is a public school district in Oakland County, Michigan. It serves Ortonville and parts of Brandon Township and Groveland Township. It also serves part of Hadley Township in Lapeer County.

== History ==
Brandon High School has used four buildings: The first was built in 1912 in Ortonville.

Harvey-Swanson Elementary was built as Brandon High School in 1957. The architect was Neal B. Smith of Royal Oak.

A high school was built at 300 South Street in 1972. It became overcrowded within ten years. It is no longer used by the school district.

Construction of the current Brandon High School was completed in 1982, but voters rejected a millage to fund its operation. It was not until January 1984 that the district was financially able to open the new building.

== Schools ==
List of schools in Brandon School District
School	Address	Notes
Harvey-Swanson Elementary	209 Varsity Drive, Ortonville	Grades PreK-5. Built 1957.
Oakwood Elementary	2839 Oakwood Road, Ortonville	Grades PreK-5. Opened April 2008.
Brandon Middle School	609 S Ortonville Road, Ortonville	Grades 6-8
Brandon High School	1025 S Ortonville Road, Ortonville	Grades 9-12. Built 1982.
