= Ortonville, Michigan =

- Village
- Village of Ortonville
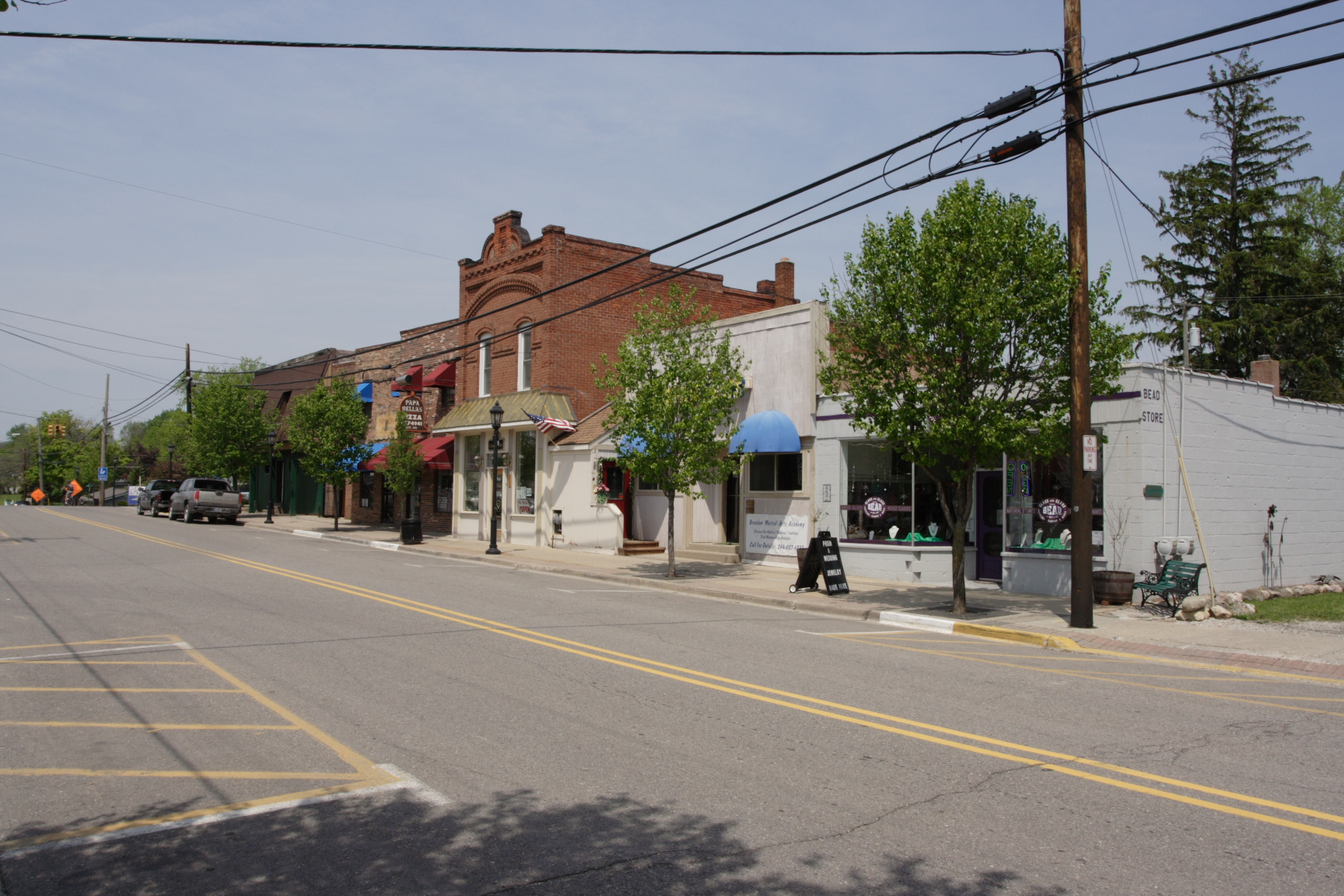
- Downtown Ortonville along Mill Street

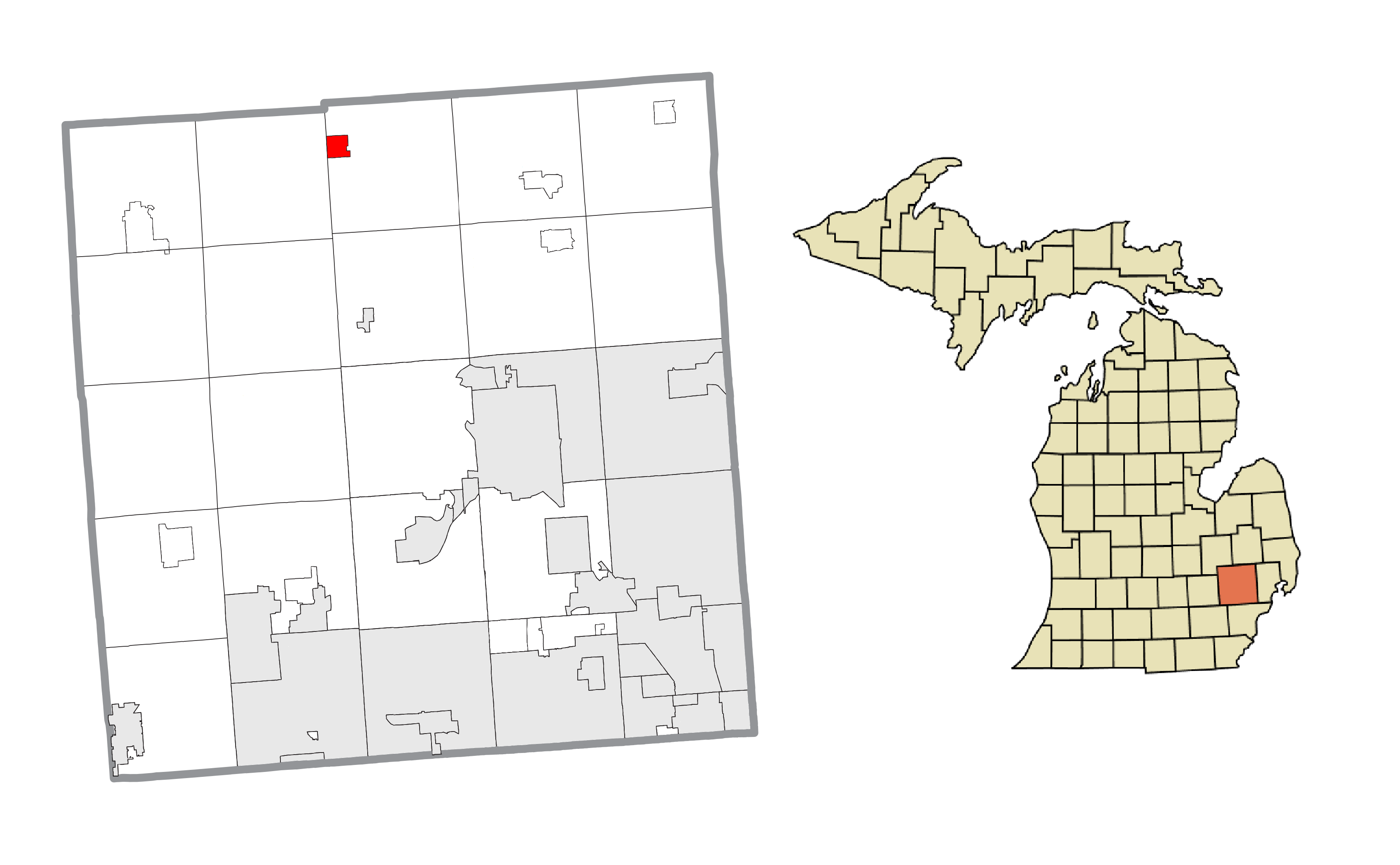
- Location within Oakland County

- Location within the state of Michigan
- Coordinates: 42°51′08″N 83°26′35″W
- Country: United States
- State: Michigan
- County: Oakland
- Township: Brandon
- Settled: 1848
- Platted: 1866
- Incorporated: 1902

Government
  - President: Tonja Brice

Area
  - Village: 0.97 sq mi (2.50 km^{2})
  - Land: 0.97 sq mi (2.50 km^{2})
  - Water: 0.0039 sq mi (0.01 km^{2})
- Elevation: 942 ft (287 m)

Population (2020)
  - Village: 1,376
  - Density: 1,427.4/sq mi (551.13/km^{2})
  - Metro: 4,296,250 (Metro Detroit)
- Time zone: UTC-5 (EST)
  - Summer (DST): UTC-4 (EDT)
- ZIP code(s): 48462
- Area codes: 248 and 810
- FIPS code: 26-61220
- GNIS feature ID: 0634118
- Website: Official website

Ortonville is a village in north Oakland County in the U.S. state of Michigan. The village is within Brandon Township, although some development near the village lies within adjacent Oakland County, Groveland township and Lapeer County, Hadley township. The population was 1,291 as of the 2021 Census estimate. Ortonville lies on the northern edge of Metro Detroit and is approximately 41 miles (66 km) north of Downtown Detroit.

== Overview ==
Ortonville, a northern rural village in Oakland County, was founded in 1848 by Amos Orton, who built a dam across Kearsley Creek to furnish water power for his gristmill. The town was platted in 1866 and incorporated as a village in 1902. It is located about halfway between Pontiac and Flint.

According to the census of 2010 the population of the village of Ortonville is 1,422. The population of Brandon Township is 15,175, and nearby Groveland Township is 5,476.

Surrounding towns include Goodrich to the north, Oxford to the east, Clarkston to the south, and Holly to the west.

== Public school system ==
Ortonville's primary public schools are the Brandon School District, in Brandon Township. Students are mostly Brandon, Groveland Township and Hadley Township residents with a few from surrounding areas of northern Clarkston and western Oxford. Brandon High School is the home of the Blackhawks. The athletic teams compete in the Flint Metro League.

The schools in the district are:

- Brandon High School (grades 9–12)
- Brandon Middle School (grades 6–8)
- Oakwood Elementary (grades JK–5)
- Harvey Swanson Elementary (grades JK–5)

Former Schools:

- H.T. Burt Elementary School
- H.T. Burt Lifelong Learning Center
- Belle Ann Elementary School
- Brandon Fletcher Intermediate School
- Sherman Lifelong Learning Center

== Geography ==
According to the United States Census Bureau, the village has a total area of 0.98 square miles (2.54 km^{2}), all land.

== Demographics ==
Historical population
Census	Pop.	Note	%±
1880	308		—
1890	313		1.6%
1910	377		—
1920	445		18.0%
1930	553		24.3%
1940	622		12.5%
1950	702		12.9%
1960	771		9.8%
1970	983		27.5%
1980	1,190		21.1%
1990	1,252		5.2%
2000	1,535		22.6%
2010	1,442		−6.1%
2020	1,376		−4.6%
U.S. Decennial Census

=== 2010 census ===
As of the census of 2010, there were 1,442 people, 511 households, and 376 families living in the village. The population density was 1,471.4 inhabitants per square mile (568.1/km^{2}). There were 574 housing units at an average density of 585.7 per square mile (226.1/km^{2}). The racial makeup of the village was 95.5% White, 0.6% African American, 0.5% Native American, 1.2% Asian, 0.4% from other races, and 1.8% from two or more races. Hispanic or Latino of any race were 2.6% of the population.

There were 511 households, of which 40.7% had children under the age of 18 living with them, 51.3% were married couples living together, 17.4% had a female householder with no husband present, 4.9% had a male householder with no wife present, and 26.4% were non-families. 21.5% of all households were made up of individuals, and 6.3% had someone living alone who was 65 years of age or older. The average household size was 2.76 and the average family size was 3.18.

The median age in the village was 37.5 years. 27.5% of residents were under the age of 18; 9.5% were between the ages of 18 and 24; 25.8% were from 25 to 44; 30.3% were from 45 to 64; and 7.1% were 65 years of age or older. The gender makeup of the village was 48.7% male and 51.3% female.

=== 2000 census ===
As of the census of 2000, there were 1,535 people, 537 households, and 400 families living in the village. The population density was 1,546.2 inhabitants per square mile (597.0/km^{2}). There were 572 housing units at an average density of 576.2 per square mile (222.5/km^{2}). The racial makeup of the village was 98.24% White, 0.07% African American, 0.46% Native American, 0.39% Asian, 0.46% from other races, and 0.39% from two or more races. Hispanic or Latino of any race were 1.69% of the population.

There were 537 households, out of which 45.8% had children under the age of 18 living with them, 56.2% were married couples living together, 14.7% had a female householder with no husband present, and 25.5% were non-families. 22.5% of all households were made up of individuals, and 7.4% had someone living alone who was 65 years of age or older. The average household size was 2.81 and the average family size was 3.29.

In the village, the population was spread out, with 32.4% under the age of 18, 7.3% from 18 to 24, 35.5% from 25 to 44, 17.5% from 45 to 64, and 7.3% who were 65 years of age or older. The median age was 33 years. For every 100 females, there were 93.6 males. For every 100 females age 18 and over, there were 87.0 males.

The median income for a household in the village was $60,972, and the median income for a family was $72,443. Males had a median income of $59,083 versus $31,250 for females. The per capita income for the village was $24,110. About 3.3% of families and 4.8% of the population were below the poverty line, including 4.0% of those under age 18 and 5.2% of those age 65 or over.
