= Oakland County, Michigan =

County in Michigan, United States

Coordinates: 42.66°N 83.38°W

- County
- County of Oakland
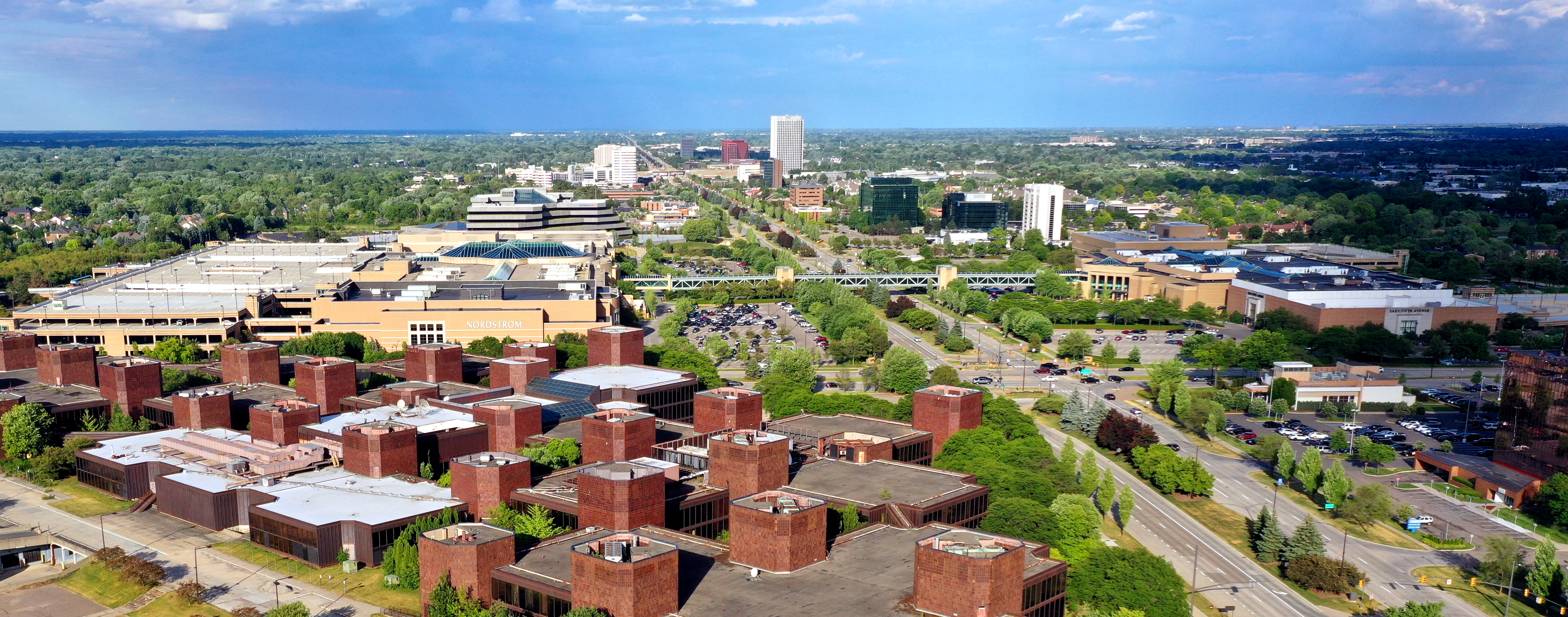
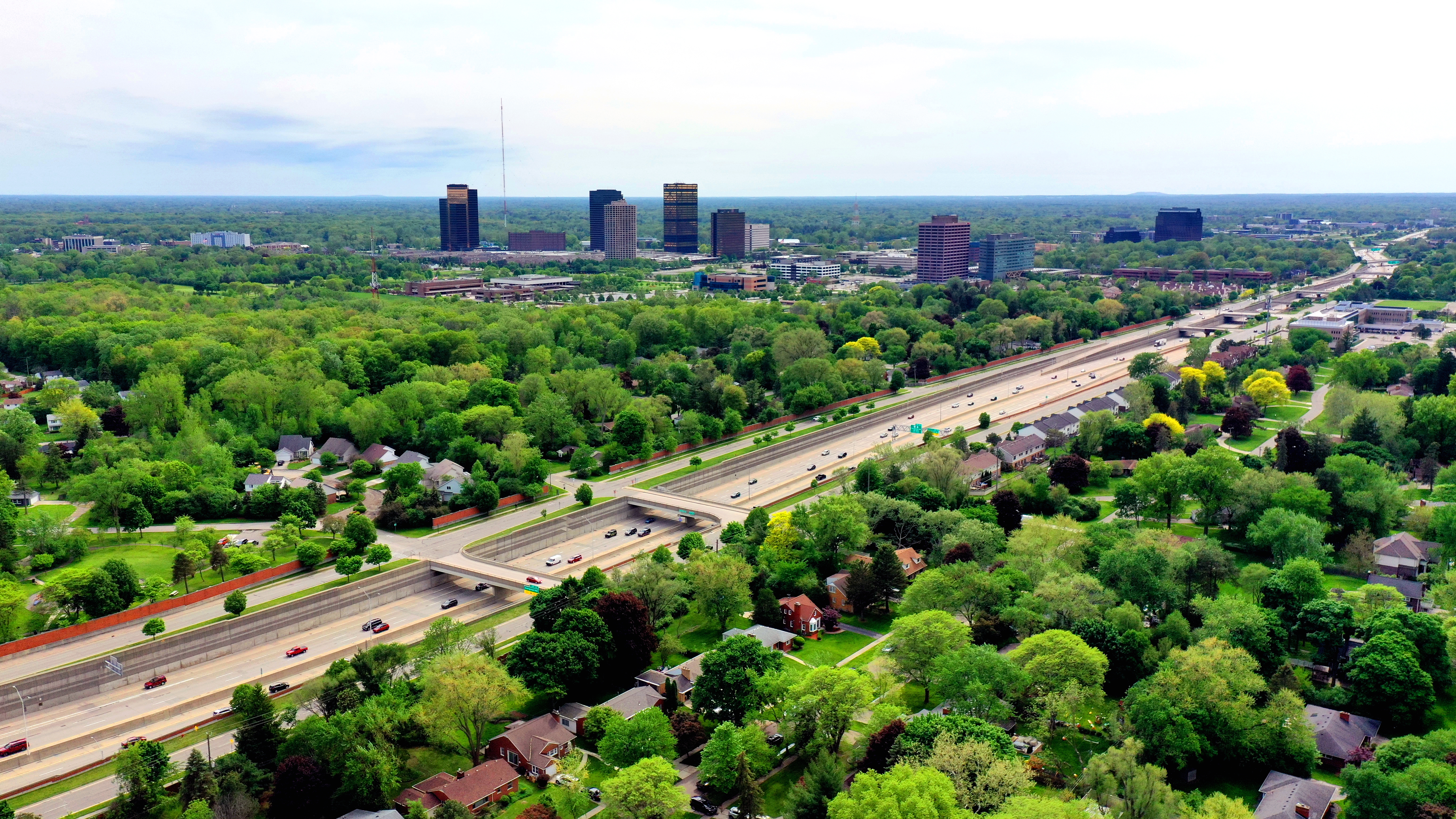
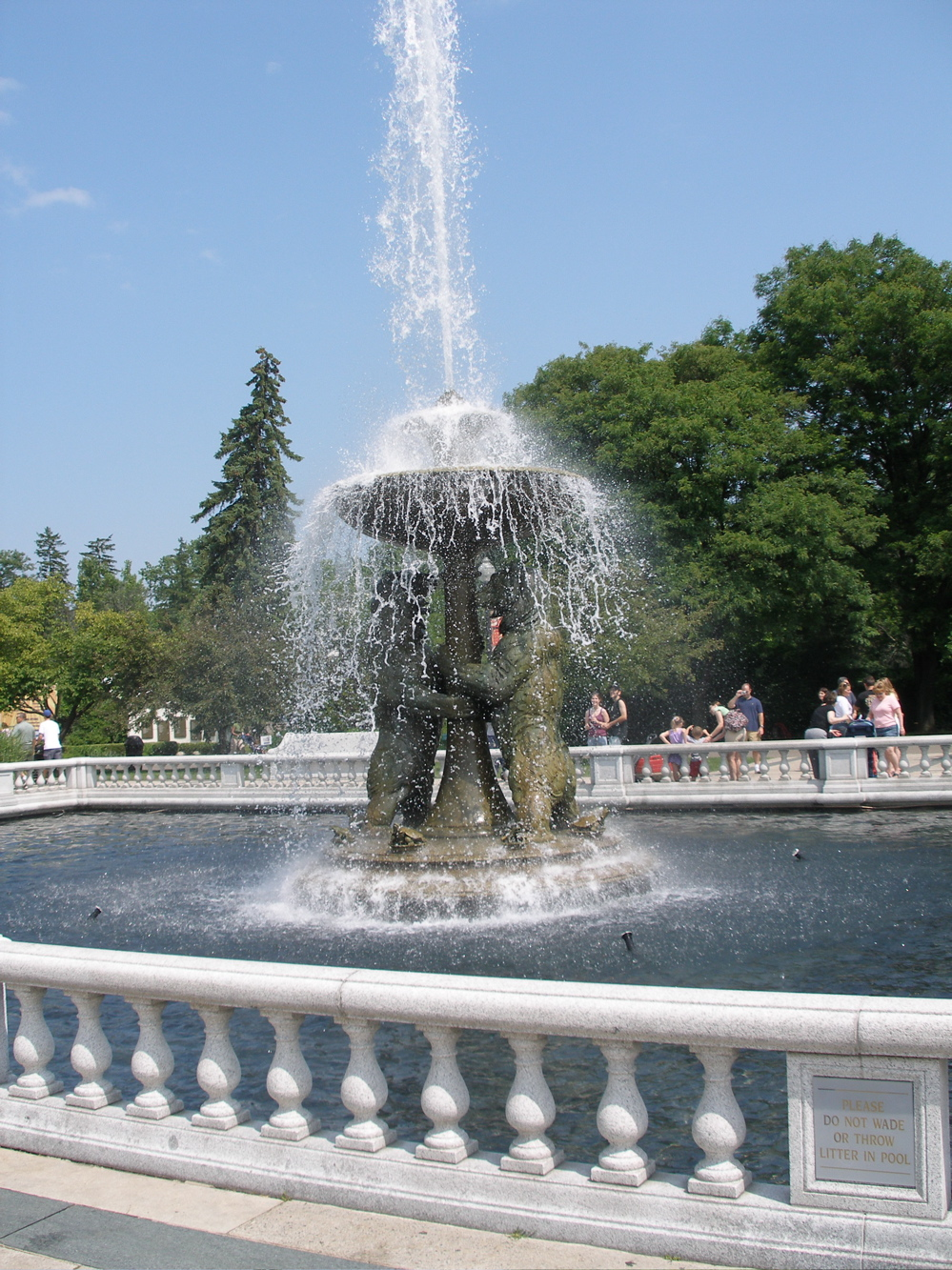
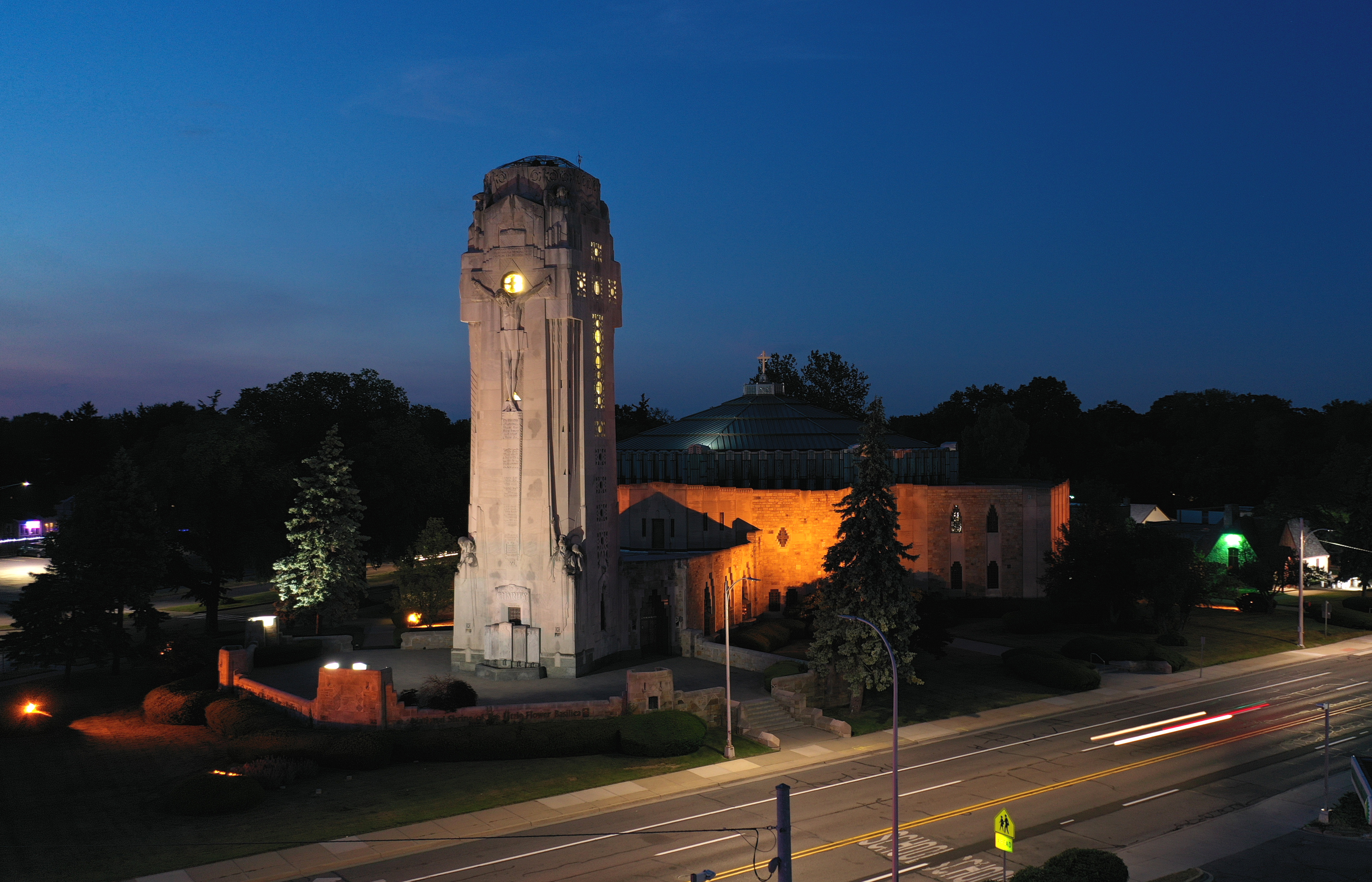
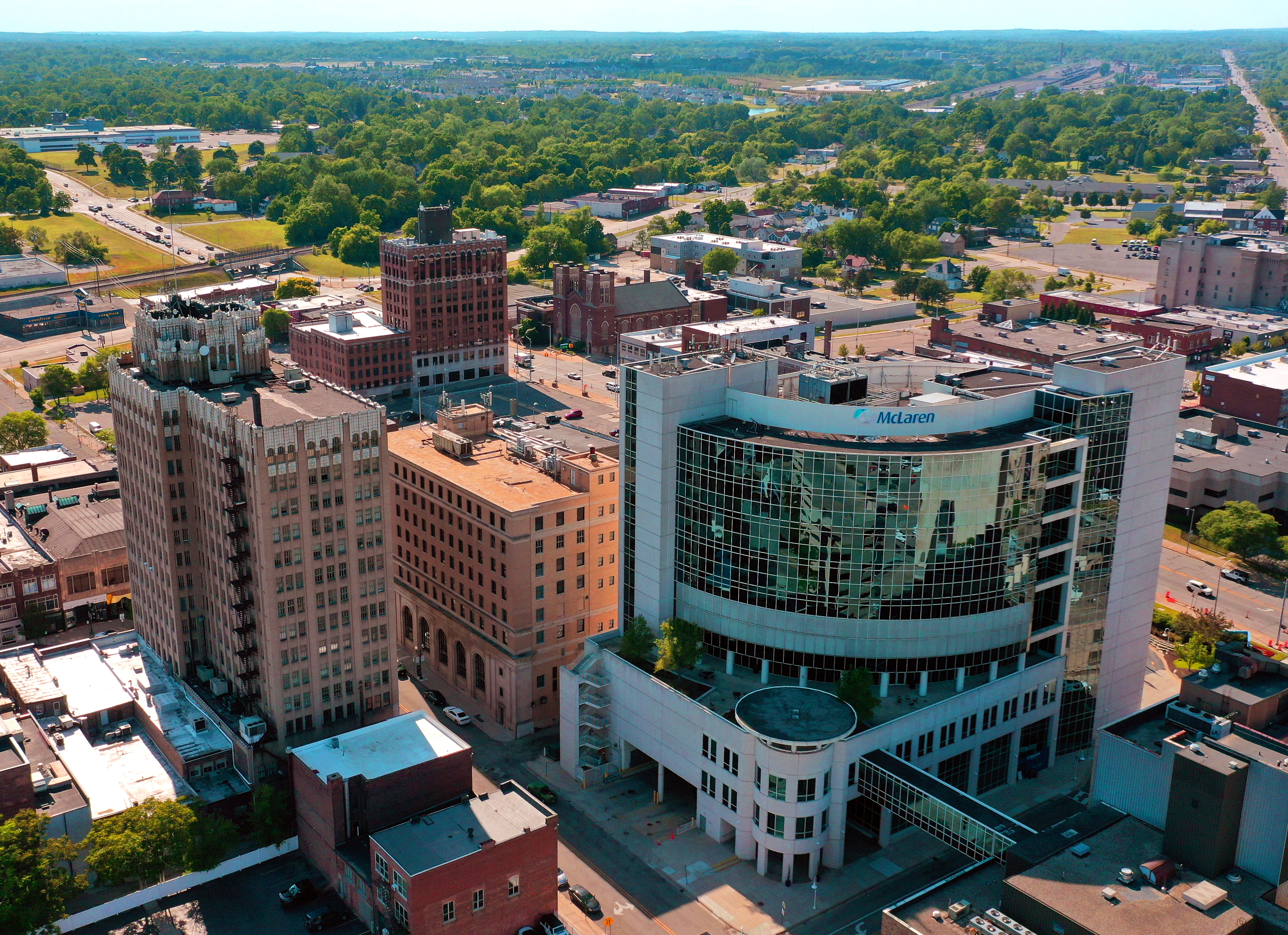
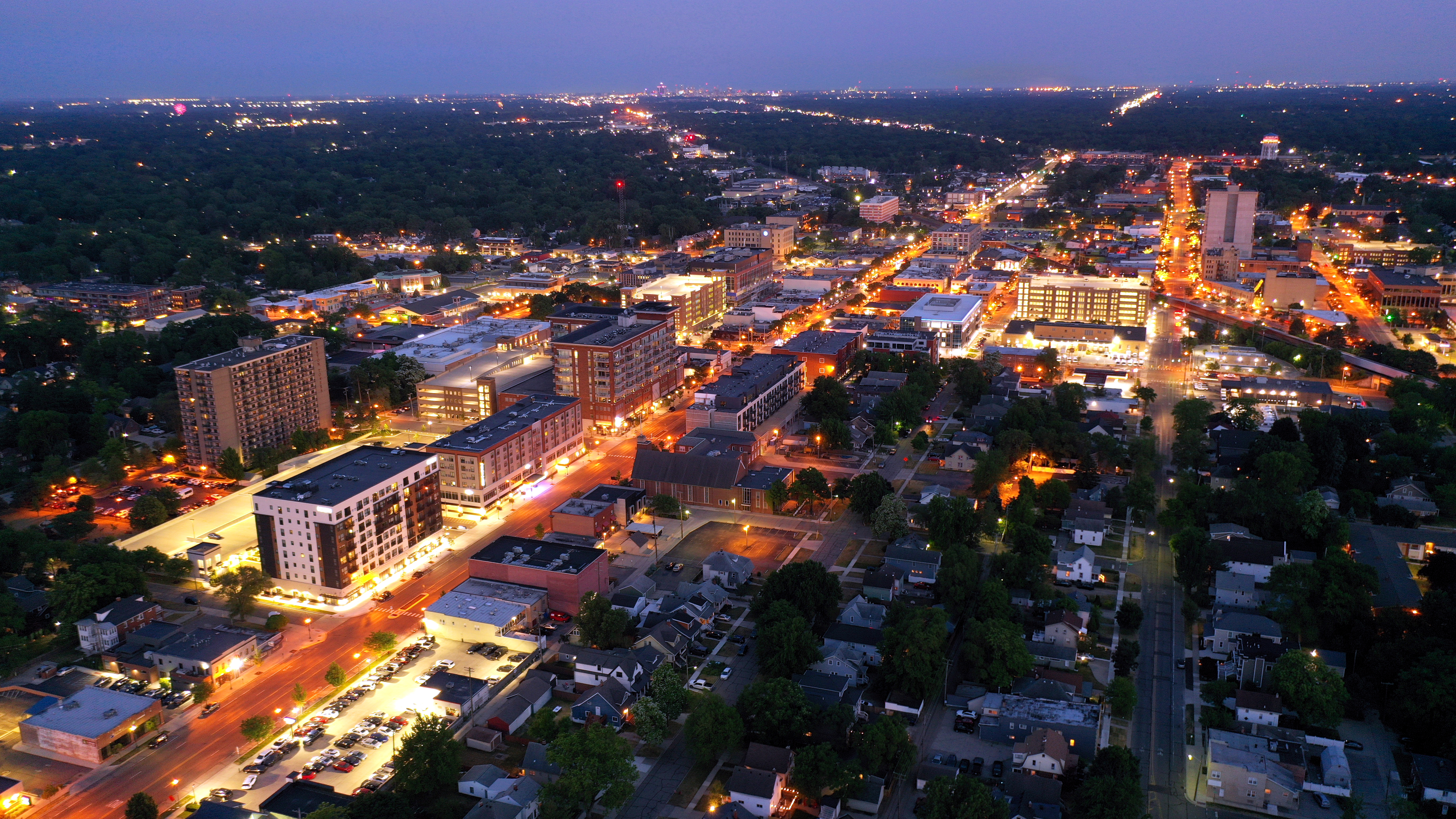
- Top-to-bottom, left-to-right: Troy's skyline, Southfield's skyline, Rackham Fountain (at the Detroit Zoo), National Shrine of the Little Flower Basilica (Royal Oak), Downtown Pontiac, Downtown Royal Oak (downtown Detroit on the horizon)

- Flag Seal Logo

- Location within the state of Michigan

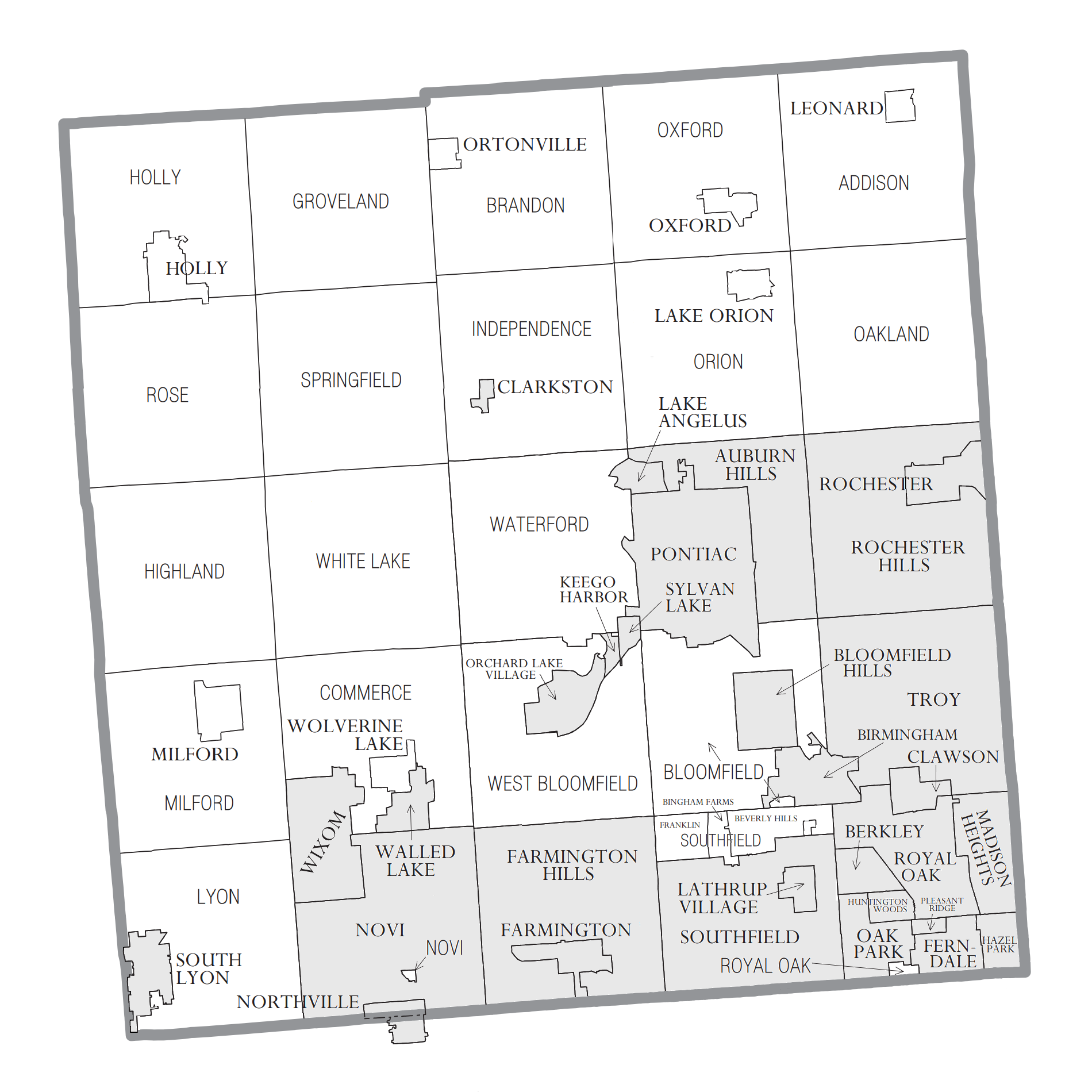
- Cities and Townships in the county
- Country: United States
- State: Michigan
- Metro: Metro Detroit
- Incorporated: 1819 (created); 1820 (organized)
- County seat: Pontiac (Legislative and Judicial); Waterford (Executive)
- Largest city: Troy

Government
  - Executive: David Coulter (D)
  - Prosecuting Attorney: Karen McDonald (D)

Area
  - Total: 907 sq mi (2,350 km^{2})
  - Land: 868 sq mi (2,250 km^{2})
  - Water: 40 sq mi (100 km^{2})

Population (2020)
  - Total: 1,274,395
  - Estimate (2025): 1,288,337 ▲
  - Density: 1,470/sq mi (567/km^{2})

GDP
  - Total: $143.144 billion (2024)
- Time zone: UTC−5 (Eastern Time Zone)
  - Summer (DST): UTC−4 (Eastern Daylight Time)
- Area codes: 248 and 947
- Website: oakgov.com

Oakland County is a county in the U.S. state of Michigan. It is a principal county of the Detroit metropolitan area, containing the bulk of Detroit's northern suburbs. Its county seat is Pontiac, (Note: The county's government complex is split between Pontiac and Waterford Township, but the official seat of government is Pontiac.) and its largest city is Troy. As of the 2020 census, its population was 1,274,395, making it the second-most populous county in Michigan (behind neighboring Wayne County), and the most populous county in the United States without a city of 100,000 residents.

Founded in 1819 and organized the following year, Oakland County is composed of 62 cities, villages, and townships. In 2010, Oakland County was among the ten wealthiest counties in the United States that had over one million residents. It is also home to Oakland University, a large public institution that straddles the border between the cities of Auburn Hills and Rochester Hills.

== History ==
Founded by Territorial Governor Lewis Cass in 1819, sparsely populated Oakland County was formed from Macomb County on 28 March 1820. As was customary at the time, as populations increased, other counties were organized from its land area. Over the next 16 years, Oakland lost territory to the creation of the counties of Lapeer (10 Sep 1822), Saginaw (10 Sep 1822), Sanilac (10 Sep 1822), Shiawassee (10 Sep 1822), Washtenaw (10 Sep 1822), Barry (29 Oct 1829), Calhoun (29 Oct 1829), Eaton (29 Oct 1829), Ingham (29 Oct 1829), Jackson (29 Oct 1829), Kalamazoo (29 Oct 1829), Arenac (2 Mar 1831), Gladwin (2 Mar 1831), Midland (2 Mar 1831), Livingston (21 Mar 1833), and Genesee (28 Mar 1835).

Woodward Avenue and the Detroit and Pontiac Railroad helped draw settlers in the 1840s. By 1840, Oakland had more than fifty lumber mills, processing wood harvested from the region and the Upper Peninsula. Pontiac, located on the Clinton River, was Oakland's first town and became the county seat. After the Civil War, Oakland was still primarily a rural, agricultural county with numerous isolated villages. By the end of the 19th century, three rail lines served Pontiac, and the city attracted carriage and wagon factories. In the late 1890s streetcars were constructed here and operated between Detroit.

At that time, developers made southern Oakland County a suburb of Detroit; a Cincinnati firm platted a section of Royal Oak called "Urbanrest". Migration worked both ways. Several thousand people moved from Oakland County farms to Detroit as the city attracted factories. By 1910, a number of rich Detroiters had summer homes and some year-round residences in what became Bloomfield Hills. The auto age enveloped Pontiac in the early 1900s. The Oakland Motor Car Company was founded in 1907 and became a part of General Motors Corp., which was soon Pontiac's dominant firm.

In the 1950s, Oakland County's population boomed as Detroiters began migrating to the suburbs. While the neighboring Macomb County was more inhabited by auto workers and other blue-collar workers, Oakland County's residents tended to be more affluent and generally white-collar (e.g. doctors, lawyers). Oakland County was for a time the fourth-wealthiest county in the United States, though its position has declined somewhat since the Great Recession. The median price of a home in Oakland County increased to $164,697, more than $30,000 above the national median home value. Oakland County is home to several super-regional shopping malls such as Oakland Mall, Somerset Collection, Twelve Oaks Mall, and Great Lakes Crossing Outlets.

== Geography ==
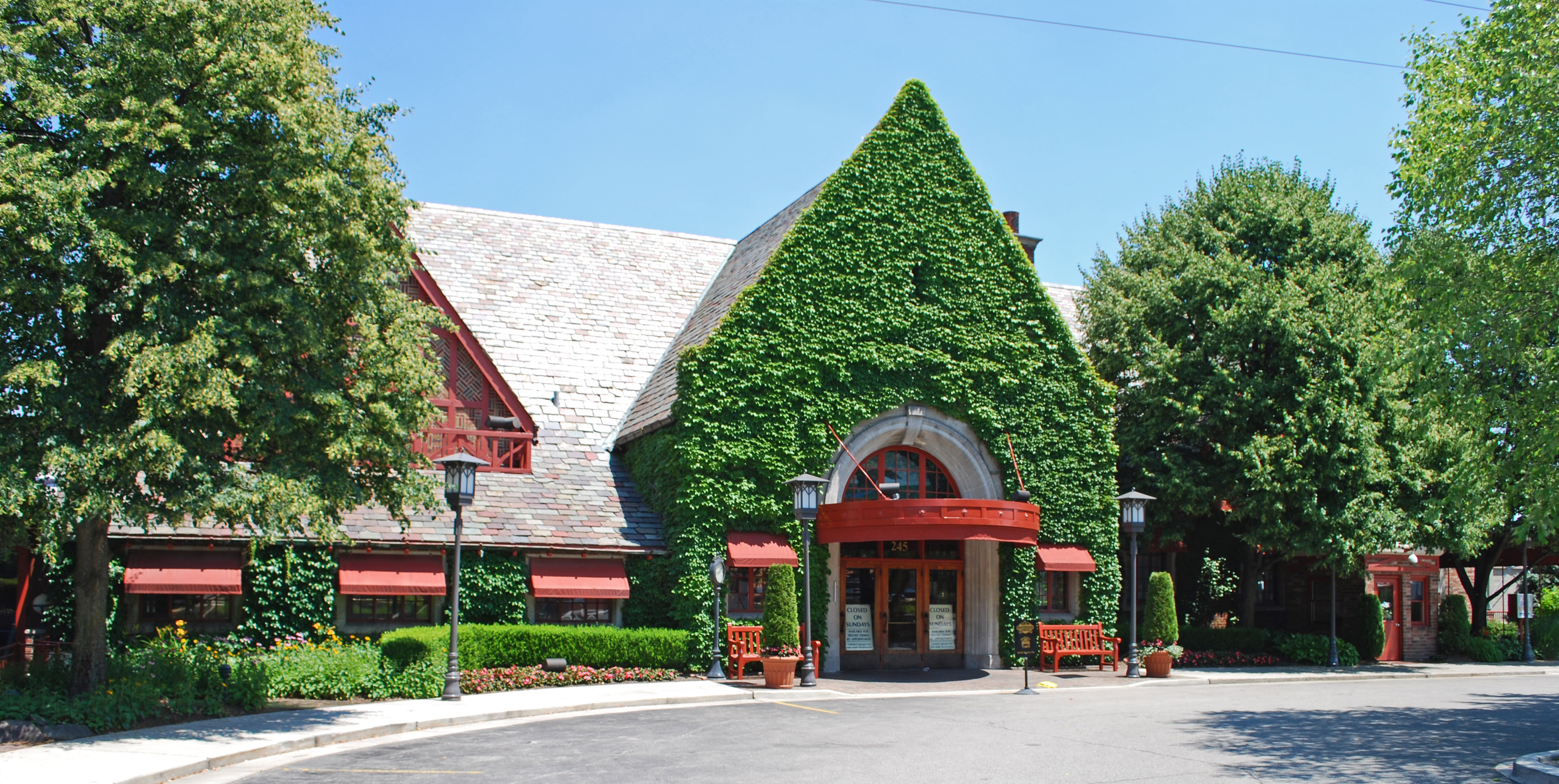
Grand Trunk Western Railroad Depot, Birmingham

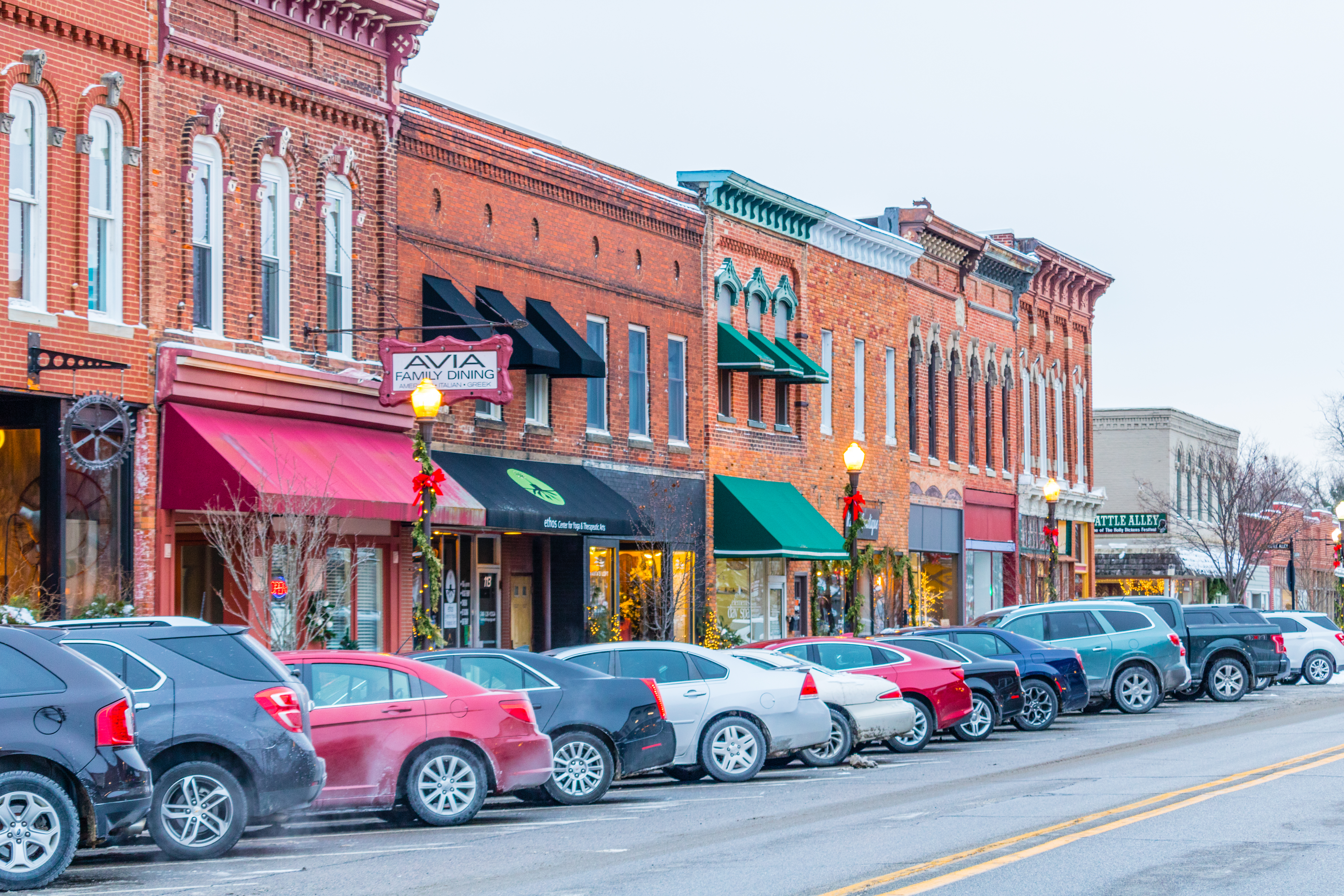
Downtown Holly

According to the U.S. Census Bureau, the county has a total area of 907 square miles (2,350 km^{2}), of which 868 square miles (2,250 km^{2}) is land and 40 square miles (100 km^{2}) (4.4%) is water.

Oakland County was originally divided into 25 separate townships, which are listed below. Each township is roughly equal in size at six miles (9.7 km) by six miles, for a total township area of 36 square miles (93 km^{2}). The roots of this design were born out of the Land Ordinance of 1785 and the subsequent Northwest Ordinance of 1787. Oakland County itself is a prime example of the land policy that was established, as all townships are equal in size (save for slight variations due to waterways). Section 16 in each township was reserved for financing and maintaining public education, and even today many schools in Oakland County townships are located within that section.

Wayne County, where the city of Detroit is located, borders Oakland County to the south. 8 Mile Road, also known as "Baseline Road" in some areas, is the boundary between these counties. The baseline was used during the original surveying for Michigan, and it serves as the northern/southern boundaries for counties from Lake St. Clair to Lake Michigan. As more working and middle-class populations moved to the suburbs from the 1950s on, this divide (8 Mile Road) became historically known as an unofficial racial dividing line between what became the predominantly black city and almost exclusively white suburbs.

Since the late 20th century, the patterns of de facto segregation have faded as the suburbs have become more diverse. Middle-class African Americans have left Detroit, settling in inner-ring suburbs, notably Southfield (where the population is 75% Black), west of Woodward Avenue. Based on the 2010 census, the following cities also have significant non-white populations: Farmington (25.3%), Farmington Hills (31.7%), Novi (30.12%), Oak Park (62.61%), Lathrup Village (72.97%), Orchard Lake Village (16.08%), Rochester Hills (20.94%), Troy (29.4%), Wixom (26.28%), West Bloomfield (24.0%), Bloomfield (18.28%), Bloomfield Hills (14.2%), Ferndale (17.2%), and Madison Heights (17.7%). Ferndale has a concentration of Arab Americans, who also live in nearby areas, and numerous Asian Americans, particularly Indians, have also settled in these areas.

=== Adjacent counties ===
- Lapeer County (northeast)
- Genesee County (northwest)
- Macomb County (east)
- Wayne County (southeast)
- Washtenaw County (southwest)
- Livingston County (west)

== Demographics ==
Historical population
Census	Pop.	Note	%±
1820	330		—
1830	4,911		1,388.2%
1840	23,646		381.5%
1850	31,270		32.2%
1860	38,261		22.4%
1870	40,867		6.8%
1880	41,537		1.6%
1890	41,245		−0.7%
1900	44,792		8.6%
1910	49,576		10.7%
1920	90,050		81.6%
1930	211,251		134.6%
1940	254,068		20.3%
1950	396,001		55.9%
1960	690,259		74.3%
1970	907,871		31.5%
1980	1,011,793		11.4%
1990	1,083,592		7.1%
2000	1,194,156		10.2%
2010	1,202,362		0.7%
2020	1,274,395		6.0%
2025 (est.)	1,288,337	▲	1.1%
U.S. Decennial Census; 1790–1960 1900–1990; 1990–2000 2010–2019

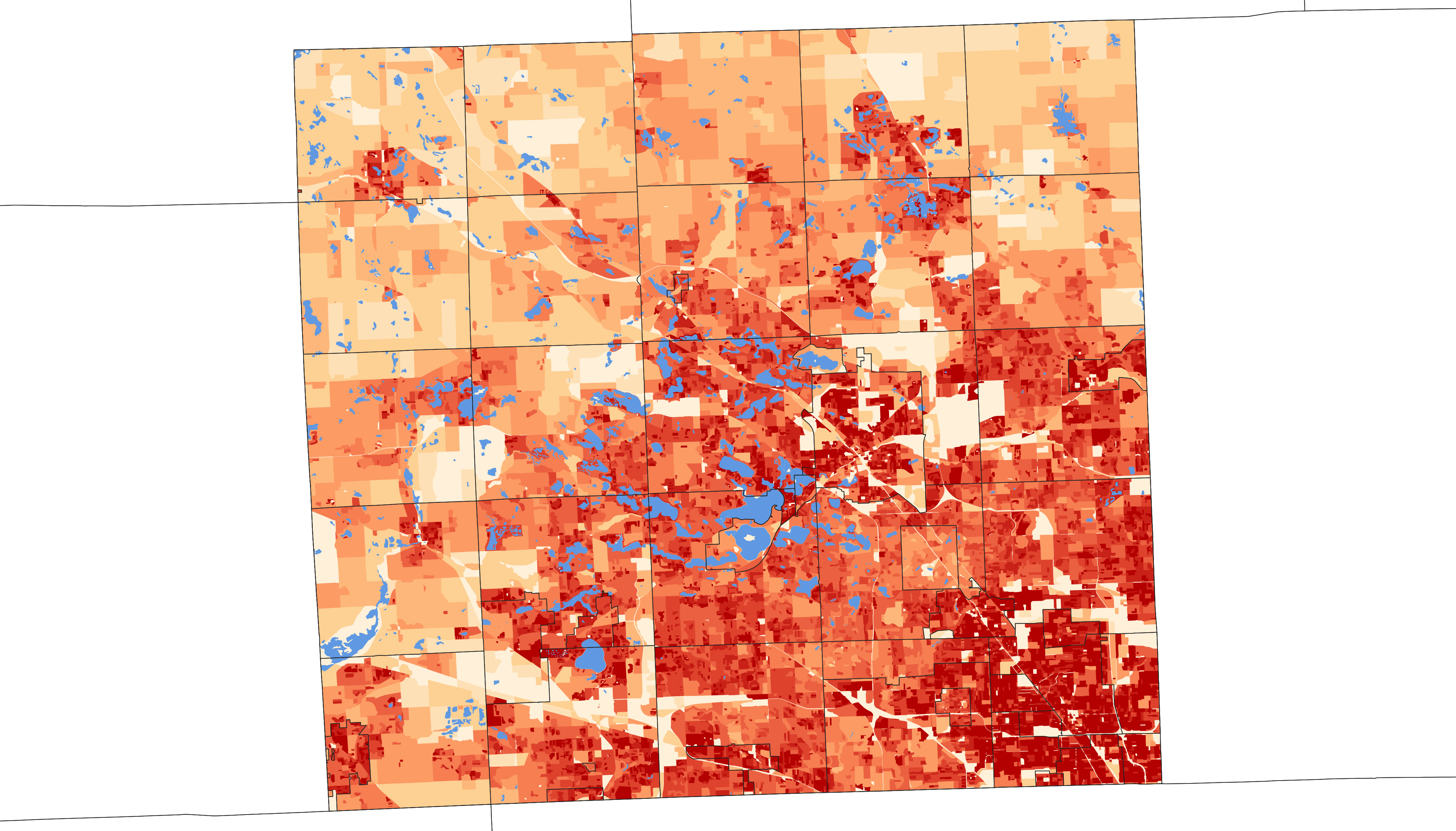
2020 population density of Oakland County MI by census block

=== Racial and ethnic composition ===
Oakland County, Michigan – Racial and ethnic composition Note: the US Census treats Hispanic/Latino as an ethnic category. This table excludes Latinos from the racial categories and assigns them to a separate category. Hispanics/Latinos may be of any race.
Race / Ethnicity (NH = Non-Hispanic)	Pop 1980	Pop 1990	Pop 2000	Pop 2010	Pop 2020	% 1980	% 1990	% 2000	% 2010	% 2020
White alone (NH)	932,805	958,300	971,752	903,398	879,137	92.19%	88.44%	81.38%	75.14%	68.98%
Black or African American alone (NH)	47,629	76,801	119,708	162,303	168,797	4.71%	7.09%	10.02%	13.50%	13.25%
Native American or Alaska Native alone (NH)	2,737	3,659	2,854	2,872	2,236	0.27%	0.34%	0.24%	0.24%	0.18%
Asian alone (NH)	11,720	24,643	49,212	67,577	105,665	1.16%	2.27%	4.12%	5.62%	8.29%
Native Hawaiian or Pacific Islander alone (NH)	x	x	258	212	304	x	x	0.02%	0.02%	0.02%
Other race alone (NH)	2,424	559	1,681	1,439	5,230	0.24%	0.05%	0.14%	0.12%	0.41%
Mixed race or Multiracial (NH)	x	x	19,692	22,641	52,188	x	x	1.65%	1.88%	4.10%
Hispanic or Latino (any race)	14,478	19,630	28,999	41,920	60,838	1.43%	1.81%	2.43%	3.49%	4.77%
Total	1,011,793	1,083,592	1,194,156	1,202,362	1,274,395	100.00%	100.00%	100.00%	100.00%	100.00%

=== 2020 census ===
As of the 2020 census, the county had a population of 1,274,395 people in 524,047 households, with an average of 2.4 persons per household. The median age was 41.0 years; 20.5% of residents were under the age of 18 and 17.7% of residents were 65 years of age or older. For every 100 females there were 95.6 males, and for every 100 females age 18 and over there were 93.5 males age 18 and over. Females comprised 50.6% of the population, roughly 13.1% of residents were foreign-born, and 49.5% of residents ages 25 and over had at least a bachelor's degree.

The racial makeup of the county was 70.1% White, 13.4% Black or African American, 0.3% American Indian and Alaska Native, 8.3% Asian, <0.1% Native Hawaiian and Pacific Islander, 1.8% from some other race, and 6.1% from two or more races. Hispanic or Latino residents of any race comprised 4.8% of the population.

94.5% of residents lived in urban areas, while 5.5% lived in rural areas.

There were 524,047 households in the county, of which 27.6% had children under the age of 18 living in them. Of all households, 48.5% were married-couple households, 18.7% were households with a male householder and no spouse or partner present, and 27.0% were households with a female householder and no spouse or partner present. About 30.1% of all households were made up of individuals and 12.0% had someone living alone who was 65 years of age or older.

There were 554,403 housing units, of which 5.5% were vacant. Among occupied housing units, 70.7% were owner-occupied and 29.3% were renter-occupied. The homeowner vacancy rate was 1.1% and the rental vacancy rate was 7.6%.

=== 2000 census ===
Among Asian Americans, eight ethnic groups had more than 1,000 members in the county in 2000. The most numerous were those of Asian Indian descent, with 20,705. Next were those of Chinese heritage, numbering 10,018. Next were those of Japanese (5,589), Filipino (5,450) Korean (5,351), Vietnamese (1,687), Pakistani (1,458) and Hmong (1,210) ancestry.

In 2001, Oakland County had the 36th largest Asian population of any county in the country. In 2002, of the Oakland-Wayne-Macomb tricounty area, Oakland County had 49% of the tri-county area's Asian population.

The median income for a household in the county in 2020 was $92,620, making Oakland County the 71st wealthiest county in the United States and the wealthiest county in Michigan. About 8.72% of the population were below the poverty line.

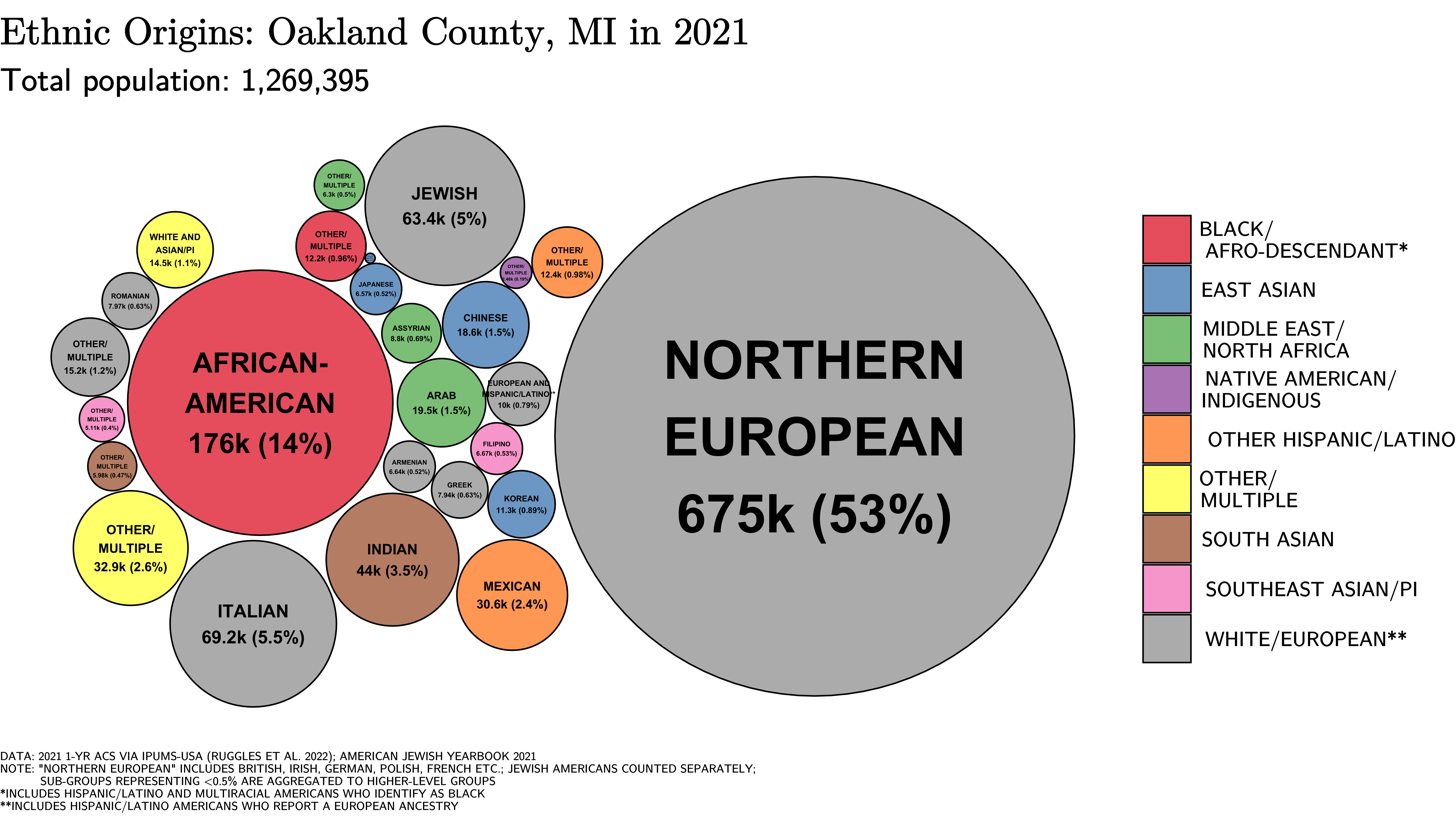
Ethnic origins in Oakland County

== Government ==
The county government operates the major local courts, keeps files of deeds and mortgages, maintains vital records, administers public health regulations, and participates with the state in the provision of welfare and other social services. The county board of commissioners controls the budget but has limited authority to make laws or ordinances. In Michigan, most local government functions—police and fire, building and zoning, tax assessment, street maintenance, etc.—are the responsibility of individual cities and townships.

=== Service Center ===
Most county operations are based at the Oakland County Service Center, which straddles Telegraph Road, split between Pontiac and neighboring Waterford Township. The east campus (in Pontiac) consists mostly of the courthouse, jail, and Sheriff's Office, while the west campus (in Waterford) contains the county executive's office, Children's Village (the county's juvenile detention center), and the headquarters of Oakland Schools, the Road Commission, and a number of other departments.

In May 2023, the county government announced a plan to relocate select offices from the Service Center back to downtown Pontiac.

=== Elected officials ===
- County Executive: Dave Coulter (D-Ferndale)
- Prosecuting Attorney: Karen McDonald (D-Birmingham)
- Sheriff: Mike Bouchard (R-Bloomfield Hills)
- County Clerk/Register of Deeds: Lisa Brown (D-West Bloomfield)
- County Treasurer: Robert Wittenberg (D-Huntington Woods)
- Water Resources Commissioner: Jim Nash (D-Farmington Hills)
- Board of Commissioners: 19 members, elected from districts (12 Democrats, 7 Republicans)

=== Law enforcement ===
The Oakland County Sheriff's Office is the largest sheriff's department in the state of Michigan. In 2017 it had 859 uniformed officers, although in 2022 it had nearly 100 unfilled vacancies. Republican Michael Bouchard has served as the Oakland County Sheriff since 1999.

Ten townships, 3 cities, and 2 villages in the county do not have municipal police forces, but rather contract with the sheriff for police services specific to the municipalities. Those municipalities are Addison Township (including the village of Leonard), Brandon Township (including the village of Ortonville), Clarkston, Commerce Township, Highland Township, Independence Township, Lyon Township, Oakland Township, Orion Township, Oxford Township, Springfield Township, Pontiac, and Rochester Hills. The Oakland County Sheriff's Office also operates the county jail, a civil division, marine division, alcohol and traffic enforcement units, and an aviation division. The marine patrol and rescue unit patrols 450 lakes across the county.

=== Road Commission ===
Roads that are not maintained by a local community (city/village) are maintained by the independent Road Commission for Oakland County, which is governed by three board members appointed by the Oakland County Board of Commissioners.

== Politics ==
United States presidential election results for Oakland County, Michigan
Year	Republican		Democratic		Third party(ies)	
Year	No.	%	No.	%	No.	%
1884	4,842	45.03%	5,386	50.09%	525	4.88%
1888	5,389	47.31%	5,410	47.50%	591	5.19%
1892	4,763	44.98%	4,925	46.51%	902	8.52%
1896	5,846	46.01%	5,271	41.49%	1,588	12.50%
1900	6,173	53.04%	4,966	42.67%	499	4.29%
1904	6,986	61.88%	3,956	35.04%	347	3.07%
1908	6,267	58.18%	3,950	36.67%	554	5.14%
1912	4,083	35.46%	3,668	31.86%	3,762	32.68%
1916	7,730	51.86%	6,659	44.67%	517	3.47%
1920	19,321	70.98%	6,421	23.59%	1,478	5.43%
1924	28,603	81.27%	4,105	11.66%	2,488	7.07%
1928	45,343	81.53%	10,011	18.00%	264	0.47%
1932	32,462	47.79%	33,135	48.78%	2,331	3.43%
1936	30,071	40.64%	40,329	54.50%	3,597	4.86%
1940	49,002	50.71%	47,022	48.67%	599	0.62%
1944	59,627	51.49%	55,272	47.73%	914	0.79%
1948	62,516	53.49%	51,491	44.06%	2,859	2.45%
1952	115,503	60.73%	73,871	38.84%	805	0.42%
1956	152,990	60.37%	99,901	39.42%	527	0.21%
1960	162,026	54.27%	135,531	45.39%	1,005	0.34%
1964	114,025	38.33%	182,797	61.44%	686	0.23%
1968	156,538	45.31%	154,630	44.76%	34,290	9.93%
1972	241,613	63.78%	129,400	34.16%	7,838	2.07%
1976	244,271	58.69%	164,266	39.47%	7,668	1.84%
1980	253,211	54.65%	164,869	35.58%	45,248	9.77%
1984	306,050	66.71%	150,286	32.76%	2,464	0.54%
1988	283,359	61.27%	174,745	37.78%	4,384	0.95%
1992	242,160	43.57%	214,733	38.64%	98,867	17.79%
1996	219,855	43.48%	241,884	47.84%	43,903	8.68%
2000	274,319	48.10%	281,201	49.31%	14,745	2.59%
2004	316,633	49.32%	319,387	49.75%	5,957	0.93%
2008	276,956	41.94%	372,566	56.42%	10,873	1.65%
2012	296,514	45.37%	349,002	53.40%	8,055	1.23%
2016	289,203	43.23%	343,070	51.29%	36,652	5.48%
2020	325,971	42.22%	434,148	56.24%	11,872	1.54%
2024	337,791	43.75%	419,519	54.33%	14,835	1.92%

United States Senate election results for Oakland County, Michigan1
Year	Republican		Democratic		Third party(ies)	
Year	No.	%	No.	%	No.	%
2024	325,903	42.69%	418,749	54.85%	18,802	2.46%

Michigan Gubernatorial election results for Oakland County
Year	Republican		Democratic		Third party(ies)	
Year	No.	%	No.	%	No.	%
2022	238,448	37.84%	383,895	60.92%	7,862	1.25%

Oakland County was historically a bastion of suburban conservatism, and was hence a longstanding stronghold of the Republican Party. In the 1990s it became highly competitive, and since 2008 it has shifted toward the Democratic Party, giving over 50% of its votes to the Democratic candidate for president in each election since.

In 1996, Bill Clinton became the first Democrat to carry Oakland County since Lyndon Johnson in 1964, and only the fourth to do so since 1892. In 2008, the county swung significantly to Barack Obama, who became the first Democrat to win over 50% of its votes since Johnson. In 2020, Joe Biden won 56% of the vote, becoming the first Democrat to carry the county by a margin of over 100,000 votes.

Republican strength is concentrated in the many exurban townships of the county, while Democratic strength is concentrated in suburbs such as Royal Oak, Farmington Hills, West Bloomfield, and Southfield. Some suburbs, such as Novi, Troy, Birmingham, and Rochester, were historically strongly Republican but are now relatively split between the two parties, with younger adults tending to support Democrats and older residents tending to support Republicans.

While the Democratic Party has found increasing success in presidential elections in Oakland County, the state Republican Party has remained strong in some recent gubernatorial and state elections. The county favored Republican Rick Snyder by a 22-point margin in the 2010 Michigan gubernatorial election and again by a 12-point margin in the 2014 election; conversely, the county favored Democratic candidate Gretchen Whitmer by a 17-point margin in the 2018 election and again by a 23-point margin in the 2022 election. Republicans held a majority on the County Commission for most of its history, but following the 2018 elections, Democrats won a narrow 11–10 majority on the commission.

In the 119th Congress, Oakland County is represented by three Democrats: Debbie Dingell (6th), Haley Stevens (11th), and Rashida Tlaib (12th) and three Republicans: Tom Barrett (7th), John James (10th) and Lisa McClain (9th).

== Transportation ==
=== Air ===
- Oakland County International Airport (PTK) (Waterford Township) – General aviation and charter passenger flights.
- Oakland/Troy Airport (VLL) (Troy) – General aviation and charter passenger flights.

The following airports are located in neighboring counties:

- Detroit Metropolitan Wayne County Airport (DTW) – Major commercial airport and hub for Delta Air Lines and Spirit Airlines located in Wayne County.
- Bishop International Airport (FNT) – Commercial airport located in Genesee County.
- Coleman A. Young International Airport (DET) – General aviation airport in Detroit.

=== Major highways ===
- I-75 (Walter P. Chrysler Freeway) is the main north–south highway in the region, serving Flint, Pontiac, Troy, and Detroit, before continuing south (as the Fisher and Detroit-Toledo Freeways) to serve many of the communities along the shore of Lake Erie.
- I-96 runs northwest–southeast through Oakland County and (as the Jeffries Freeway) has its eastern terminus in downtown Detroit.
- I-275 runs north–south from I-75 in the south to the junction of I-96 and I-696 in the north, providing a bypass through the western suburbs of Detroit.
- I-696 (Walter P. Reuther Freeway) runs east–west from the junction of I-96 and I-275, providing a route through the northern suburbs of Detroit. Taken together, I-275 and I-696 form a semicircle around Detroit.
- US 24 ends just outside Clarkston at I-75. To the south, US 24 serves suburban Detroit and Monroe before entering Ohio. Much of US 24 in Oakland County is named Telegraph Road, and it is a major north–south road extending from Toledo, Ohio, through Monroe, Wayne, and Oakland Counties to Pontiac. It gained notoriety in a song (Telegraph Road) by the group Dire Straits.
- M-1 (Woodward Avenue) has a northern terminus in Pontiac. The route continues southerly from Oakland County into the City of Detroit, ending downtown. The Detroit Zoo is located along M-1 in Oakland County. M-1 is also home to the Woodward Dream Cruise, a classic-car cruise from Pontiac to Ferndale that is held in August. It is the largest single-day classic-car cruise in America.
- M-5 (Haggerty Connector) provides expressway access from Commerce and West Bloomfield Townships at Pontiac Trail to the I-96/I-275/I-696 interchange, then follows the Farmington bypass to Grand River Avenue west of Middlebelt Road, continuing along Grand River into downtown Detroit.
- M-10 (John C. Lodge Freeway) runs largely parallel to I-75 from Southfield to downtown Detroit. The service drives are named Northwestern Highway.
- M-15 (Ortonville Road, Main Street in Clarkston)
- M-24 (Lapeer Road) has a southern terminus at I-75 northeast of Pontiac. To the north, the route continues to Lapeer and beyond. Note: M-24 and US 24 do not intersect at present, although this was the case until the 1950s.
- M-39 (Southfield Freeway) runs north–south from I-94 in Allen Park to Southfield. North of Nine Mile Road, the freeway ends and continues as Southfield Road into Birmingham.
- M-59 (Highland Road [from Pontiac westerly], Huron Street [within Pontiac] and Veterans Memorial Freeway [Pontiac to Utica]), continues east in Macomb County as Hall Road to Clinton Township and west to I-96 near Howell
- M-102 Perhaps better known as 8 Mile Road, M-102 follows the Oakland–Wayne county line for most of its length. 8 Mile Road, known by many due to the film 8 Mile, forms the dividing line between Detroit on the south and the suburbs of Macomb and Oakland counties on the north. It is also known as Baseline Road outside Detroit, because it coincides with the baseline used in surveying Michigan; that baseline is also the boundary for a number of Michigan counties. It is designated M-102 for much of its length in Wayne County.
- M-150 (Rochester Road) serves as a spur highway from M-59 into the city of Rochester.
- Grand River Avenue connects the suburbs of Brighton, Novi, and Farmington to downtown Detroit. The avenue follows the route of old US 16 before I-96 replaced it in 1962. It is one of the five roads planned by Judge August Woodward to radiate out from Detroit and connect the city to other parts of the state.

=== Intercity rail ===
Amtrak's thrice-daily Wolverine serves Oakland County, with stations in Pontiac, Troy, and Royal Oak, before continuing on to Detroit and west to Chicago.

=== Mile roads ===
Surface-street navigation in metro Detroit is commonly anchored by "mile roads", major east–west surface streets that are spaced at one-mile (1.6 km) intervals and increment as one travels north and away from the city center. Mile roads sometimes have two names, the numeric name (e.g., 15 Mile Road), used in Macomb County, and a local name (e.g., Maple Road), used in Oakland County (for the most part).

=== Bicycling ===
The conditions on most non-residential roads in Oakland County are not favorable to bicycling. Exceptions to this are primarily in the inner-ring suburbs within the southeast corner of the county. This is due to their street grid.

A primary reason for these unfavorable cycling conditions is the Road Commission for Oakland County has a policy of not accommodating bicycles on the road. As a result, some communities have designated sidepaths (locally called "safety paths") as bike routes which do not meet the American Association of State Highway and Transportation Officials (AASHTO) guidelines for bicycling facilities and have been found to be less safe than on-road bike facilities.

As a result, there are no designated Bicycle Friendly Communities within Oakland County.

Only the city of Ferndale has a built comprehensive bicycle network of bike lanes and signed shared roadways.

== Education ==
The County of Oakland counterpart in public education (K–12) is the Oakland Schools, an Intermediate school district. The county is also home to multiple renowned private elementary and high schools, including The Roeper School and Cranbrook.

=== Higher education ===
- Oakland University
- Oakland Community College
- Lawrence Technological University
- Baker College of Royal Oak
- Rochester Christian University
- Walsh College
- Saint Mary's College of Madonna University
- Cranbrook College of Art

=== K-12 education ===
School districts:

- Almont Community Schools
- Avondale School District
- Berkley School District
- Birmingham City School District
- Bloomfield Hills School District
- Brandon School District
- Clarenceville School District
- Clarkston Community School District
- Clawson Public Schools
- Farmington Public Schools
- Fenton Area Public Schools
- Ferndale Public Schools
- Goodrich Area Schools
- Grand Blanc Community Schools
- Hazel Park City School District
- Holly Area Schools
- Huron Valley Schools
- Lake Orion Community Schools
- Lamphere Public Schools
- Madison Public Schools
- Northville Public Schools
- Novi Community School District
- Oak Park City School District
- Oxford Area Community Schools
- Pontiac City School District
- Rochester Community Schools
- Romeo Community Schools
- Royal Oak City School District
- South Lyon Community Schools
- Southfield Public School District
- Troy School District
- Walled Lake Consolidated Schools
- Warren Consolidated Schools
- Waterford School District
- West Bloomfield School District

== Sports ==
Club	League	Venue	Established	Championships
Oakland County FC	Premier League of America, Soccer	Clawson Park Stadium	2015	

The NFL's Detroit Lions played their home games at the Pontiac Silverdome in Pontiac from 1975 through 2001, when they moved to Ford Field in Downtown Detroit. The Detroit Pistons played at the Silverdome from 1978 to 1988. The Silverdome was also the site of Super Bowl XVI, where the San Francisco 49ers defeated the Cincinnati Bengals, the first of 5 Super Bowl titles for the 49ers. The Pontiac Silverdome also hosted various other sporting events, prior to being demolished in 2017.

From 1988 to 2017, prior to the move to Little Caesars Arena in Detroit, the Detroit Pistons played their home games at The Palace of Auburn Hills in Auburn Hills. The Palace of Auburn Hills was demolished in 2020.

== Communities ==
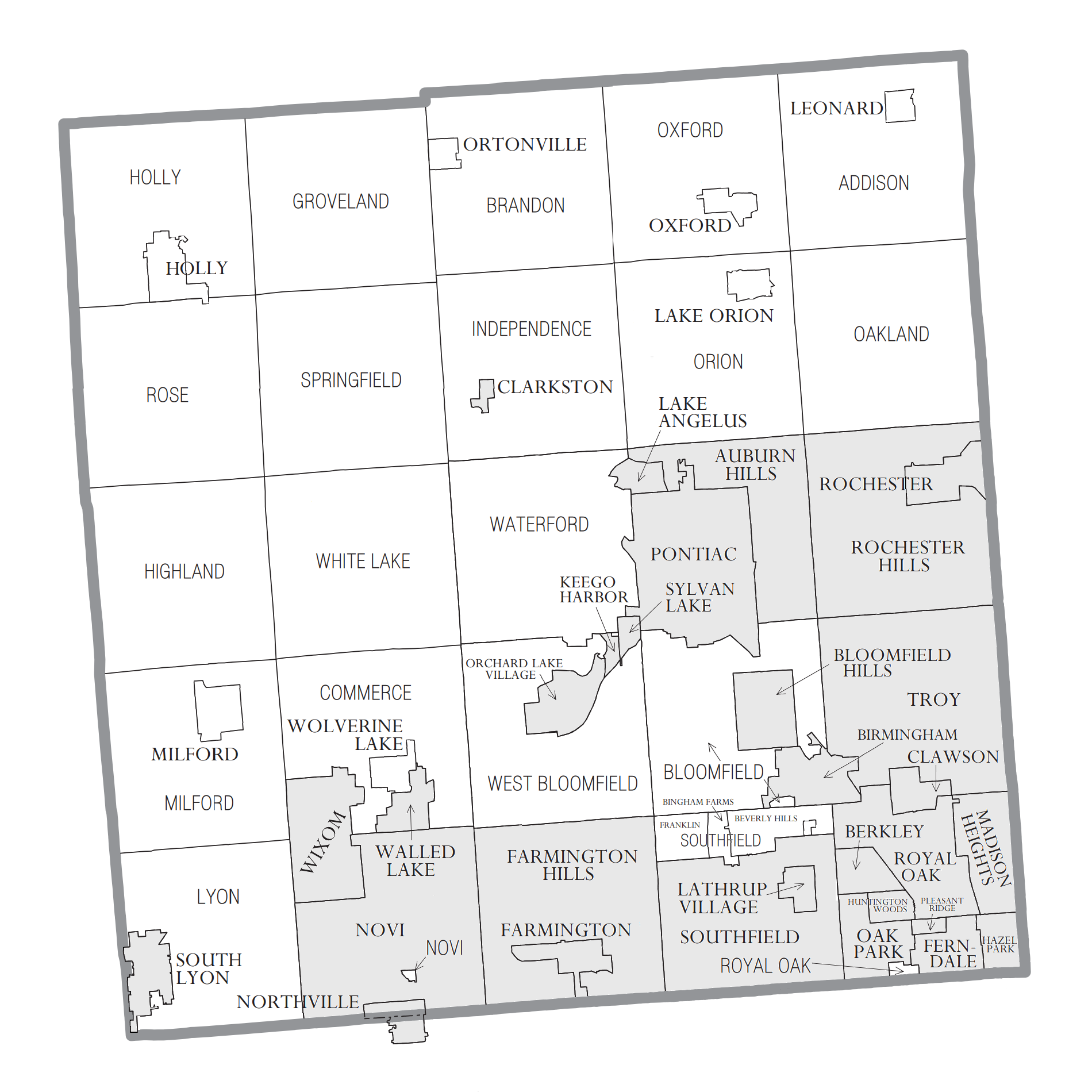
U.S. Census data map showing local municipal boundaries within Oakland County. Shaded areas represent incorporated cities

=== Cities ===
- Auburn Hills
- Berkley
- Birmingham
- Bloomfield Hills
- Clarkston
- Clawson
- Farmington
- Farmington Hills
- Fenton (mostly in Genesee County)
- Ferndale
- Hazel Park
- Huntington Woods
- Keego Harbor
- Lake Angelus
- Lathrup Village
- Madison Heights
- Northville (partially in Wayne County)
- Novi
- Oak Park
- Orchard Lake Village
- Pleasant Ridge
- Pontiac (county seat)
- Rochester
- Rochester Hills
- Royal Oak
- South Lyon
- Southfield
- Sylvan Lake
- Troy
- Walled Lake
- Wixom

=== Villages ===
- Beverly Hills
- Bingham Farms
- Franklin
- Holly
- Lake Orion
- Leonard
- Milford
- Ortonville
- Oxford
- Wolverine Lake

=== Charter townships ===
- Bloomfield Charter Township
- Brandon Charter Township
- Commerce Charter Township
- Highland Charter Township
- Independence Charter Township
- Lyon Charter Township
- Milford Charter Township
- Oakland Charter Township
- Orion Charter Township
- Oxford Charter Township
- Royal Oak Charter Township
- Springfield Charter Township
- Waterford Charter Township
- West Bloomfield Charter Township
- White Lake Charter Township

=== Civil townships ===
- Addison Township
- Groveland Township
- Holly Township
- Novi Township
- Rose Township
- Southfield Township

=== Unincorporated communities ===
- Andersonville
- Austin Corners
- Brandon Gardens
- Campbells Corner
- Charing Cross
- Clintonville
- Clyde
- Commerce
- Davisburg
- Drayton Plains
- East Highland
- Elizabeth Lake
- Five Points
- Four Towns
- Gingellville
- Glengary
- Goodison
- Groveland Corners
- Hickory Ridge
- Highland
- Huron Heights
- Jossman Acres
- Kensington (former)
- Lake Orion Heights
- Lakeville
- New Hudson
- Newark
- Oak Grove
- Oakley Park
- Oakwood
- Oxbow
- Perry Lake Heights
- Rose Center
- Rose Corners
- Rudds Mill
- Seven Harbors
- Springfield
- Thomas
- Union Lake
- Walters
- Waterford Village
- Waterstone
- West Highland
- Westacres
- White Lake

== Rivers and lakes ==
Oakland County contains 387 lakes, and four major rivers run through the county:

- Clinton River
- Huron River
- Rouge River
- Shiawassee River

The headwaters of each of these rivers lie in Oakland County.

== See also ==
- Woodward Corridor
- National Register of Historic Places listings in Oakland County, Michigan
- List of Michigan State Historic Sites in Oakland County
- Oakland County Child Killer
- Saginaw Trail
