= Groveland Township, Michigan =

- Civil township
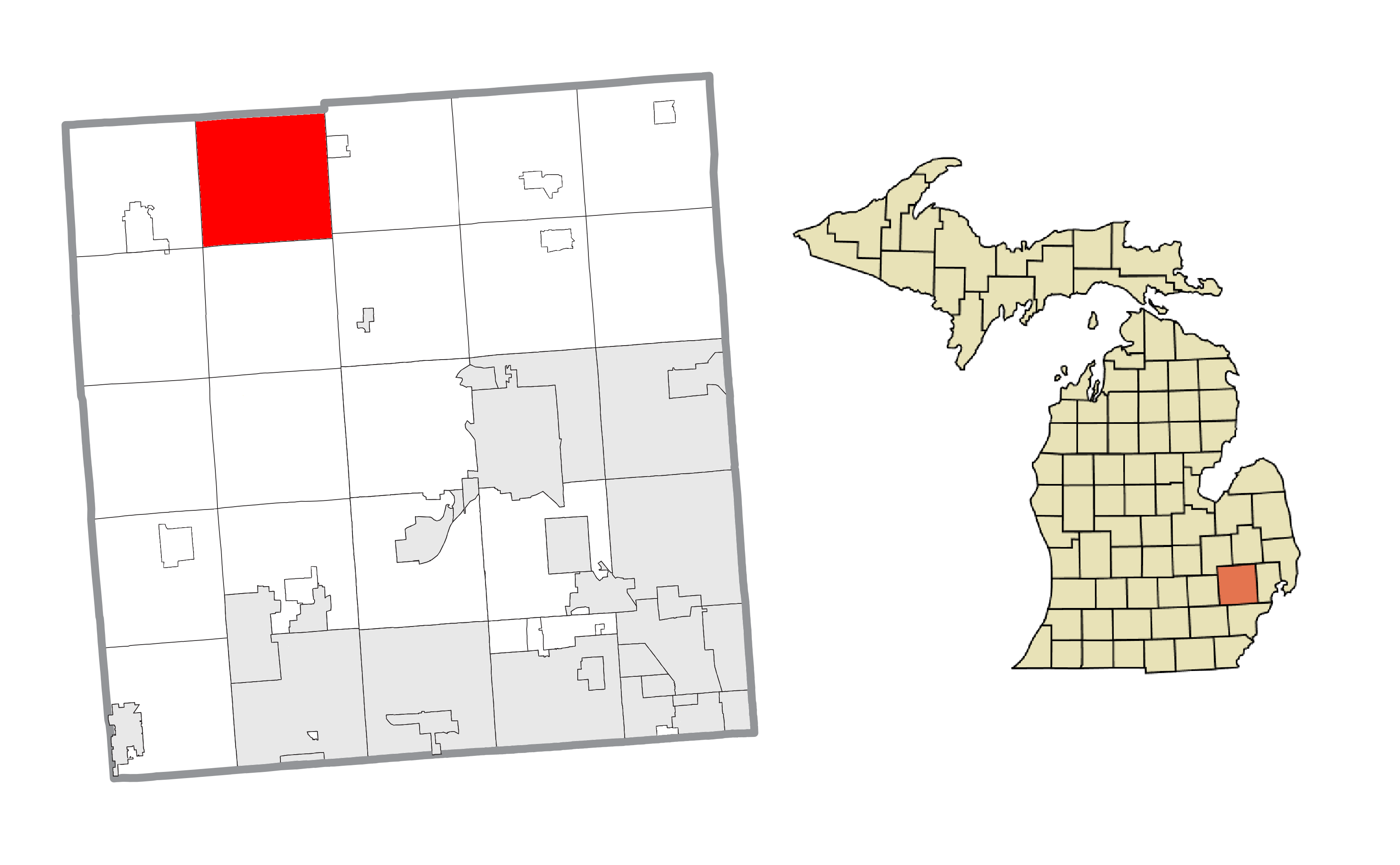
- Location within Oakland County

- Location within the state of Michigan Groveland Township (the United States)
- Coordinates: 42°49′35″N 83°31′18″W
- Country: United States
- State: Michigan
- County: Oakland
- Established: 1835

Government
  - Supervisor: Kevin Scramlin
  - Clerk: Jenell Keller

Area
  - Civil township: 36.04 sq mi (93.3 km^{2})
  - Land: 35.26 sq mi (91.3 km^{2})
  - Water: 0.78 sq mi (2.0 km^{2})
- Elevation: 978 ft (298 m)

Population (2020)
  - Civil township: 5,912
  - Density: 167.7/sq mi (64.74/km^{2})
  - Metro: 4,296,250 (Metro Detroit)
- Time zone: UTC-5 (Eastern (EST))
  - Summer (DST): UTC-4 (EDT)
- ZIP code(s): 48348 (Clarkston); 48442 (Holly); 48462 (Ortonville)
- Area code: 248
- FIPS code: 26-35640
- GNIS feature ID: 1626414
- Website: Official website

Groveland Township is a civil township of Oakland County in the U.S. state of Michigan. The population was 5,912 at the 2020 census. Groveland Township was established in 1835.

== Communities ==
There are no incorporated villages in the township, but there are two unincorporated communities within the township:

- Austin Corners located on the southern boundary of the township with Springfield Township at Dixie Highway and Oakhill Road (42°47′16″N 83°30′29″W Elevation: 1106 ft./337 m.) The former post office was named for David Austin Wright, the first postmaster, who along with Horatio Wright established the office on March 2, 1848. The name was changed to Taylorsville on September 5, 1849, back to Austin on May 11, 1853, and closed on April 30, 1901.
- Groveland Corners, formerly Cottage Corners, is located at the junction of Dixie Highway and Grange Hall Road (42°48′58″N 83°32′52″W Elevation: 991 ft./302 m.). After 1922, Groveland Clinic was built there and the community acquired the name Groveland Corners.

== Geography ==
According to the United States Census Bureau, the township has a total area of 36.04 square miles (93.34 km^{2}), of which 35.26 square miles (91.32 km^{2}) is land and 0.78 square miles (2.02 km^{2}) (2.16%) is water.

== Demographics ==
As of the census of 2000, there were 5,476 people, 1,943 households, and 1,542 families residing in the township. The racial makeup of the township was 96.7% White, 0.8% African American, 0.3% Native American, 0.5% Asian, 0.5% from other races, and 1.2% from two or more races. Hispanic or Latino of any race were 1.7% of the population.

There were 1,943 households, out of which 31.7% had children under the age of 18 living with them, 68.1% were married couples living together, 7.2% had a female householder with no husband present, and 20.6% were non-families. 16.3% of all households were made up of individuals, and 2.1% had someone living alone who was 65 years of age or older. The average household size was 2.79 and the average family size was 3.12.

In the township the population was spread out, with 4.1% under the age of 5, 6.4% ages 5 to 9, 7.8% ages 10 to 14, 8.7% ages 15 to 19, 4.7% ages 20 to 24, 3.5% ages 25 to 29, 4.5% ages 30 to 34, 5.0% ages 35 to 39, 8.0% ages 40 to 44, 9.5% ages 45 to 49, 10.8% ages 50 to 54, 9.0% ages 55 to 59, 7.9% ages 60 to 64, 4.9% ages 65 to 69, 2.6% ages 70 to 74, 1.2% ages 75 to 79, 0.9% ages 80 to 84 and 0.5% ages 85 and older. The median age was 43.4 years. For every 100 females, there were 106.9 males.

The median income for a household in the township was $72,188, and the median income for a family was $83,789. Males had a median income of $61,436 versus $26,414 for females. The per capita income for the township was $28,574. About 4.7% of families and 8.3% of the population were below the poverty line, including 14.5% of those under age 18 and 8.1% of those age 65 or over.
