= Brandon High School (Michigan) =

Public secondary school in Ortonville, Michigan

Location
- 1025 South Ortonville Road (M-15); Ortonville, Michigan 48462; United States
- Coordinates: 42.8375000°N 83.4411111°W

Information
- School type: Public
- Established: 1982
- School district: Brandon School District
- Principal: Daniel Stevens
- Teaching staff: 32.40 (FTE)
- Grades: 9-12
- Enrollment: 695 (as of 2023-2024)
- Student to teacher ratio: 21.45
- Campus type: Closed
- Colors: Royal blue and White
- Athletics conference: Flint Metro League
- Mascot: Blackhawk
- Team name: The Blackhawks
- Newspaper: The Hawk's Eye View
- Yearbook: Wingspan

Student assessments
- 2021–22 school year Change vs. prior year

M-STEP 11th grade proficiency rates (Science / Social Studies)
- Advanced %: 30.3 / 12.0
- Proficient %: 30.3 / 34.3
- PR. Proficient %: 13.1 / 42.9
- Not Proficient %: 26.3 / 10.9

Average test scores
- SAT Total: 988.4 (▼ −3.5)

Brandon High School is a public secondary school located in Ortonville, Michigan.

== History ==
The now defunct Varsity Hockey team won 4 regional championships in a row.

== Campus ==
The current building was completed in 1982.

Brandon High School's two previous incarnations are still standing and in use. The 1973 incarnation became a middle school, and is now Fletcher Intermediate School. That building replaced the 1949 Brandon School, which became Howard T. Burt and, later, Harvey-Swanson Elementary School. Burt and Harvey-Swanson combined to take the Harvey-Swanson Elementary School name. Harvey-Swanson is also the location of Brandon's varsity athletic fields.

== Extracurricular activities ==
=== National Honor Society ===
Brandon High School National Honor Society (NHS) is an organization that focuses on developing and support student scholarship, character, service, and leadership throughout high school. The NHS is a Society that is selected by a 5-member Faculty Council every Spring. Sophomores and Juniors are considered for selection based on having a 3.5 GPA or higher. These candidates submit a Candidate Informational Packet to the Faculty Council. This packet provides the Council with an overview of students' activities, service to the community, and leadership experience. Once chosen by the Faculty Council, selected candidates are inducted into the Society every Fall.

== Notable alumni ==
- Matt Lentz, professional football player
- Vinnie Miller, NASCAR driver
