= Donte Jackson =

Donte Jackson may refer to:

- Donte Jackson (American football) (born 1995), American football cornerback
- Donte Jackson (basketball) (born 1979), American basketball coach
