= Kevin Johnson (basketball coach) =

American basketball coach

Southern Jaguars
- Position: Head coach
- League: SWAC

Personal information
- Born: November 11, 1966 (age 60) Morgan City, Louisiana, U.S.

Career information
- College: UT Rio Grande Valley (1984–1988)
- Playing career: 1988–1992
- Coaching career: 1989–present

Career history

Playing
- 1988–1989: Leicester Riders
- 1990–1992: Oldham Celtics

Coaching
- 1989–1990: Northwestern State (assistant)
- 1990–1992: Oldham Celtics
- 1992–1996: Bryan HS (assistant)
- 1996–1997: Texas Pan–American (assistant)
- 1997–1999: Centenary (assistant)
- 1999–2005: Centenary
- 2005–2007: Louisiana Tech (assistant)
- 2007–2010: Nicholls (assistant)
- 2010–2019: Louisiana (assistant)
- 2019–2023: Tulane (assistant)
- 2023–present: Southern

Career highlights
- As coach: SWAC regular season champion (2025); SWAC Coach of the Year (2025)

Kevin Paul Johnson (born November 11, 1966) is an American basketball coach who is the current head coach of the Southern Jaguars men's basketball team.

== Playing career ==
Johnson played at Texas Pan–American (now UT Rio Grande Valley) under Lon Kruger for two seasons. In his senior year, he averaged 16.2 points per game and earned American South Conference First-Team honors. He'd embark on a professional career in England, playing one season for the Leicester Riders, and two seasons with the Oldham Celtics, acting as player/coach for the latter.

== Coaching career ==
After his first year of playing abroad, Johnson returned stateside for a one-year stint as an assistant coach at Northwestern State. Once his playing career was completed he spent four years as an assistant coach at Bryan High School in Texas before rejoining his alma mater as an assistant coach for the 1996–1997 season. In 1997, he'd join Billy Kennedy's staff at Centenary and when Kennedy departed for the head coaching position at Southeastern Louisiana, Johnson was elevated to head coach. From 1999 to 2005, he put together a 65–100 overall record with the Gentlemen. He stepped down after a 3–24 season.

After Centenary, Johnson would have assistant coaching stops at Louisiana Tech and Nicholls before a nine-year stretch under Bob Marlin at Louisiana. With the Ragin' Cajuns, he'd be on staff for the squad's Sun Belt conference tournament championship team and 2014 NCAA Tournament team. In 2019, Johnson joined Ron Hunter's coaching staff at Tulane.

On March 29, 2023, Johnson was named the 15th men's basketball coach in Southern history, replacing Sean Woods.

== Head coaching record ==
Record table
Season	Team	Overall	Conference	Standing	Postseason
Centenary Gentlemen (NCAA Division I Independent) (1999–2003)
1999–00	Centenary	10–18	–	–	
2000–01	Centenary	8–19	–	–	
2001–02	Centenary	14–13	–	–	
2002–03	Centenary	14–14	–	–	
Centenary Gentlemen (Mid-Continent Conference) (2003–2005)
2003–04	Centenary	16–12	10–6	3rd	
2004–05	Centenary	3–24	1–15	9th	
Centenary:		65–100 (.394)	11–21 (.344)		
Southern Jaguars (Southwestern Athletic Conference) (2023–present)
2023–24	Southern	18–14	12–6	T–3rd	
2024–25	Southern	19–10	14–2	1st	
2025–26	Southern	17–17	11–7	T–2nd	
Southern:		54–41 (.568)	35–15 (.700)		
Total:		119–140 (.459)			
National champion Postseason invitational champion Conference regular season champion Conference regular season and conference tournament champion Division regular season champion Division regular season and conference tournament champion Conference tournament champion
