= 2023–24 Grambling State Tigers men's basketball team =

American college basketball season

2023–24 Grambling State Tigers men's basketball

SWAC regular-season and tournament champions

NCAA tournament, First round
- Conference: Southwestern Athletic Conference
- Record: 21–15 (14–4 SWAC)
- Head coach: Donte Jackson (7th season)
- Assistant coaches: Kyle Jones; Devarus Walker; Cameron Prather
- Home arena: Fredrick C. Hobdy Assembly Center

2023–24 SWAC men's basketball standings
	Conf.				Overall
Team	W		L	PCT	W		L	PCT
Grambling State †	14	–	4	.778	21	–	15	.583
Alcorn State	13	–	5	.722	14	–	18	.438
Texas Southern	12	–	6	.667	16	–	17	.485
Southern	12	–	6	.667	18	–	14	.563
Bethune–Cookman	11	–	7	.611	17	–	17	.500
Jackson State	11	–	7	.611	15	–	17	.469
Alabama A&M	9	–	9	.500	12	–	23	.343
Alabama State	8	–	10	.444	13	–	19	.406
Arkansas–Pine Bluff	8	–	10	.444	13	–	18	.419
Prairie View A&M	5	–	13	.278	10	–	21	.323
Florida A&M	4	–	14	.222	6	–	23	.207
Mississippi Valley State	1	–	17	.056	1	–	30	.032
† 2024 SWAC tournament winner

The 2023–24 Grambling State Tigers men's basketball team represented Grambling State University in the 2023–24 NCAA Division I men's basketball season. The Tigers, led by seventh-year head coach Donte Jackson, played their home games at the Fredrick C. Hobdy Assembly Center in Grambling, Louisiana as members of the Southwestern Athletic Conference (SWAC). They finished the season 21–15, 14–4 in SWAC play, to win the regular-season championship. As the No. 1 seed in the SWAC tournament, they defeated Alabama State, Bethune–Cookman and Texas Southern to win the SWAC tournament championship; as a result, they received the conference's automatic bid to the NCAA tournament for the first time in school history. As a No. 16 seed in the Midwest region, they defeated Montana State in the First Four, before losing to Purdue in the first round.

== Previous season ==
The Tigers finished the 2022–23 season 24–9, 15–3 in SWAC play, to finish regular-season co-champions with Alcorn State. In the SWAC tournament, they defeated No. 7 Bethune–Cookman in the quarterfinals, and No. 3 Jackson State in the semifinals, before losing to No. 8 Texas Southern in the SWAC championship.

== Roster ==
2023–24 Grambling State Tigers men's basketball team
Players
Coaches

Pos.	#	Name	Height	Weight	Year	Hometown
G	00	Kintavious Dozier	6 ft 1 in (1.85 m)	195 lb (88 kg)	Jr	Lanett, AL
G	1	Jimel Cofer	6 ft 4 in (1.93 m)	190 lb (86 kg)	So	San Marcos, TX
G	2	Zahad Munford	6 ft 3 in (1.91 m)	170 lb (77 kg)	GS	Dallas, TX
G	3	Mikale Stevenson	6 ft 2 in (1.88 m)	175 lb (79 kg)	GS	Fort Wayne, IN
G/F	4	Antwan Burnett	6 ft 5 in (1.96 m)	205 lb (93 kg)	GS	Montgomery, AL
G	5	Tra'Michael Moton	6 ft 1 in (1.85 m)	170 lb (77 kg)	GS	Shreveport, LA
F	10	Jalen Johnson	6 ft 8 in (2.03 m)	240 lb (109 kg)	GS	Indianapolis, IN
G/F	11	Jourdan Smith	6 ft 7 in (2.01 m)	180 lb (82 kg)	Sr	New Orleans, LA
F	12	Jonathan Aku	6 ft 11 in (2.11 m)	255 lb (116 kg)	Sr	Kaduna, Nigeria
G	20	Chilaydrien Newton	6 ft 3 in (1.91 m)	180 lb (82 kg)	Fr	Simsboro, LA
F	22	Emeka Nnaji	6 ft 8 in (2.03 m)	225 lb (102 kg)	So	Minneapolis, MN
G	24	Quintin Murrell	6 ft 4 in (1.93 m)	175 lb (79 kg)	Jr	Milwaukee, WI
G	24	Terrence Lewis	6 ft 6 in (1.98 m)	205 lb (93 kg)	GS	Milwaukee, WI
F	25	William Reynolds	6 ft 4 in (1.93 m)	180 lb (82 kg)	RS So	Washington, D.C.
G	30	Payton Parrish	6 ft 0 in (1.83 m)	180 lb (82 kg)	Jr	Milwaukee, WI
F	32	Malik Lamin	6 ft 11 in (2.11 m)	235 lb (107 kg)	RS Jr	Champlin, MN

Head coach

- Donte Jackson (Central State)

Assistant coach(es)

- Kyle Jones (Arkansas–Pine Bluff)
- Devarus Walker (William Carey)
- Cameron Prather (Cumberland)

Legend

- (C) Team captain
- (S) Suspended
- (I) Ineligible
- (W) Walk-on
- Injured
- Current redshirt

Roster
Last update: March 21, 2024

== Schedule and results ==
Date time, TV	Rank^{#}	Opponent^{#}	Result	Record	High points	High rebounds	High assists	Site (attendance) city, state
Non-conference regular season
November 6, 2023*; 7:00 p.m.		UNT Dallas	W 82–67	1–0	18 – Johnson	10 – Johnson	4 – Moton	Fredrick C. Hobdy Assembly Center (1,461); Grambling, LA
November 10, 2023*; 7:00 p.m., P12N		at Colorado; Pac-12/SWAC Legacy Series	L 63–95	1–1	26 – Moton	4 – 3 tied	5 – Moton	CU Events Center (6,541); Boulder, CO
November 14, 2023*; 6:00 p.m.		Champion Christian	W 113–73	2–1	23 – Johnson	10 – Smith	7 – Stevenson	Fredrick C. Hobdy Assembly Center (552); Grambling, LA
November 17, 2023*; 5:00 p.m.		vs. Delaware State; HBCU All-Star Classic	L 63–71	2–2	24 – Dozier	13 – Aku	3 – 2 tied	Forbes Arena; Atlanta, GA
November 19, 2023*; 12:00 p.m., ESPN+		at Iowa State	L 37–92	2–3	14 – Dozier	3 – 3 tied	2 – Stevenson	Hilton Coliseum (12,975); Ames, IA
November 22, 2023*; 1:30 p.m.		vs. Sam Houston; Trojan Classic	L 68–86	2–4	19 – Stevenson	7 – Aku	4 – 2 tied	Trojan Arena (132); Troy, AL
November 24, 2023*; 4:00 p.m., ESPN+		at Troy; Trojan Classic	L 67–80	2–5	11 – Lewis	6 – Lewis	2 – 4 tied	Trojan Arena (1,843); Troy, AL
December 2, 2023*; 1:00 p.m., ESPN+		at Dayton	L 46–76	2–6	10 – Stevenson	8 – Aku	3 – 2 tied	UD Arena (13,407); Dayton, OH
December 10, 2023*; 7:00 p.m., P12N		at Washington State	L 65–83	2–7	34 – Dozier	4 – 2 tied	1 – 4 tied	Beasley Coliseum (2,158); Pullman, WA
December 14, 2023*; 7:00 p.m., ESPN+		at Drake	L 56–68	2–8	16 – Dozier	10 – Johnson	4 – Stevenson	Knapp Center (2,864); Des Moines, IA
December 20, 2023*; 6:00 p.m., ESPN+		at Southeastern Louisiana	L 47–48	2–9	19 – Dozier	6 – Burnett	2 – 2 tied	Pride Roofing University Center (443); Hammond, LA
December 22, 2023*; 3:00 p.m., ESPN+/SECN+		at Florida	L 57–96	2–10	14 – Burnett	7 – Aku	2 – Johnson	O'Connell Center (8,023); Gainesville, FL
January 2, 2024*; 4:00 p.m.		Biblical Studies	W 84–72	3–10	16 – Lewis	9 – Burnett	3 – 4 tied	Fredrick C. Hobdy Assembly Center (178); Grambling, LA
SWAC regular season
January 6, 2024; 4:00 p.m.		Prairie View A&M	W 69–63	4–10 (1–0)	20 – Johnson	8 – 2 tied	6 – Stevenson	Fredrick C. Hobdy Assembly Center (1,273); Grambling, LA
January 8, 2024; 7:30 p.m.		Texas Southern	L 52–54	4–11 (1–1)	11 – Moton	7 – Smith	4 – Burnett	Fredrick C. Hobdy Assembly Center (1,318); Grambling, LA
January 13, 2024; 3:00 p.m.		at Bethune–Cookman	W 79–69	5–11 (2–1)	25 – Dozier	6 – Aku	4 – 2 tied	Moore Gymnasium (882); Daytona Beach, FL
January 15, 2024; 7:30 p.m.		at Florida A&M	W 65–52	6–11 (3–1)	23 – Dozier	10 – Aku	4 – Stevenson	Al Lawson Center (897); Tallahassee, FL
January 20, 2024; 2:30 p.m.		Southern	W 79–62	7–11 (4–1)	27 – Dozier	7 – Cofer	3 – Cofer	Fredrick C. Hobdy Assembly Center (2,807); Grambling, LA
January 27, 2024; 4:00 p.m.		Mississippi Valley State	W 54–46	8–11 (5–1)	14 – Burnett	12 – Burnett	2 – Stevenson	Fredrick C. Hobdy Assembly Center (1,296); Grambling, LA
January 29, 2024; 7:30 p.m.		Arkansas–Pine Bluff	L 70–86	8–12 (5–2)	26 – Moton	5 – 2 tied	4 – Moton	Fredrick C. Hobdy Assembly Center (1,482); Grambling, LA
February 3, 2024; 5:30 p.m.		at Jackson State	W 70–62	9–12 (6–2)	19 – Moton	8 – Aku	3 – Stevenson	Prudential Center, Invesco QQQ Legacy Classic; Newark, NJ
February 5, 2024; 7:30 p.m.		at Alcorn State	W 78–67	10–12 (7–2)	19 – Smith	12 – Smith	4 – Moton	Davey Whitney Complex (1,252); Lorman, MS
February 10, 2024; 4:00 p.m.		Alabama State	W 74–68	11–12 (8–2)	21 – Dozier	7 – 2 tied	3 – Stevenson	Fredrick C. Hobdy Assembly Center (781); Grambling, LA
February 12, 2024; 7:30 p.m.		Alabama A&M	L 50–60	11–13 (8–3)	11 – Dozier	8 – Smith	2 – Smith	Fredrick C. Hobdy Assembly Center (723); Grambling, LA
February 17, 2024; 5:30 p.m.		at Texas Southern	W 66–63	12–13 (9–3)	20 – Dozier	6 – 2 tied	4 – Moton	H&PE Arena (1,800); Houston, TX
February 19, 2024; 7:30 p.m.		at Prairie View A&M	W 83–74	13–13 (10–3)	20 – Moton	8 – 2 tied	5 – Stevenson	William J. Nicks Building; Prairie View, TX
February 24, 2024; 4:30 p.m.		at Southern	W 63–57	14–13 (11–3)	16 – Lewis	7 – Aku	5 – 2 tied	F. G. Clark Center (7,189); Baton Rouge, LA
March 2, 2024; 4:00 p.m.		Florida A&M	W 75–68	15–13 (12–3)	18 – 2 tied	10 – Burnett	5 – Burnett	Fredrick C. Hobdy Assembly Center (1,533); Grambling, LA
March 4, 2024; 7:30 p.m.		Bethune–Cookman	W 69–60	16–13 (13–3)	17 – Smith	13 – Burnett	2 – 2 tied	Fredrick C. Hobdy Assembly Center (1,401); Grambling, LA
March 7, 2024; 7:30 p.m.		at Alabama A&M	W 74–73	17–13 (14–3)	17 – Moton	6 – Burnett	2 – 2 tied	Alabama A&M Events Center (3,213); Huntsville, AL
March 9, 2024; 5:30 p.m.		at Alabama State	L 84–87 ^{2OT}	17–14 (14–4)	18 – Smith	11 – Smith	4 – Smith	Dunn–Oliver Acadome (2,578); Montgomery, AL
SWAC tournament
March 13, 2024; 8:30 p.m., ESPN+	(1)	vs. (8) Alabama State; Quarterfinal	W 56–50	18–14	18 – Dozier	8 – 2 tied	2 – 3 tied	Bartow Arena (2,176); Birmingham, AL
March 15, 2024; 2:00 p.m., ESPN+	(1)	vs. (5) Bethune-Cookman; Semifinal	W 65–53	19–14	26 – Moton	6 – Moton	4 – Dozier	Bartow Arena (528); Birmingham, AL
March 16, 2024; 8:30 p.m., ESPNU	(1)	vs. (3) Texas Southern; Championship	W 75–66	20–14	20 – Smith	6 – Aku	7 – Moton	Bartow Arena (2,108); Birmingham, AL
NCAA tournament
March 20, 2024; 5:40 p.m., TruTV	(16 MW)	vs. (16 MW) Montana State; First Four	W 88–81 ^{OT}	21–14	19 – Cofer	9 – Smith	6 – Moton	UD Arena; Dayton, OH
March 22, 2024; 6:25 p.m., TBS	(16 MW)	vs. (1 MW) No. 3 Purdue; First round	L 50–78	21–15	21 – Moton	4 – 4 tied	2 – 3 tied	Gainbridge Fieldhouse; Indianapolis, IN
*Non-conference game. ^{#}Rankings from AP poll. (#) Tournament seedings in parentheses. MW=Midwest region. All times are in Central.
