= 2024 SWAC men's basketball tournament =

American Collegiate Tournament

- Classification: Division I
- Season: 2023–24
- Teams: 8
- Site: Bartow Arena; Birmingham, Alabama
- Champions: Grambling State (1st title)
- Winning coach: Donte Jackson (1st title)
- Attendance: 9,208 (total); 2,108 (championship)
- Television: ESPN+, ESPNU

2023–24 SWAC men's basketball standings
	Conf.				Overall
Team	W		L	PCT	W		L	PCT
Grambling State †	14	–	4	.778	21	–	15	.583
Alcorn State	13	–	5	.722	14	–	18	.438
Texas Southern	12	–	6	.667	16	–	17	.485
Southern	12	–	6	.667	18	–	14	.563
Bethune–Cookman	11	–	7	.611	17	–	17	.500
Jackson State	11	–	7	.611	15	–	17	.469
Alabama A&M	9	–	9	.500	12	–	23	.343
Alabama State	8	–	10	.444	13	–	19	.406
Arkansas–Pine Bluff	8	–	10	.444	13	–	18	.419
Prairie View A&M	5	–	13	.278	10	–	21	.323
Florida A&M	4	–	14	.222	6	–	23	.207
Mississippi Valley State	1	–	17	.056	1	–	30	.032
† 2024 SWAC tournament winner

The 2024 SWAC Men's Basketball Tournament was the postseason men's basketball tournament for the 2023–24 season in the Southwestern Athletic Conference (SWAC). The tournament was held from March 13–16, 2024. The tournament winner, Grambling State, received an automatic invitation to the 2024 NCAA Division I Men's Basketball Tournament. The tournament was sponsored by Pepsi.

For the first time in program history, Grambling State won the SWAC tournament, doing so in a defeat of the three-time defending champion Texas Southern in the final. In addition, it was the first time since 2019 that the regular season champion won the SWAC tournament.

== Seeds ==
Teams will be seeded by record within the conference, with a tie–breaker system to seed teams with identical conference records. Only the top eight teams in the conference will qualify for the tournament.

Seed	School	Conference	Tiebreaker
1	Grambling State	14–4	
2	Alcorn State	13–5	
3	Texas Southern	12–6	Plus 5 point differential in season split with Southern
4	Southern	12–6	Minus 5 point differential in season split with Texas Southern
5	Bethune–Cookman	11–7	Plus 10 point differential in season split with Jackson State
6	Jackson State	11–7	Minus 10 point differential in season split with Bethune–Cookman
7	Alabama A&M	9–9	
8	Alabama State	8–10	Plus 5 point differential in season split with Arkansas–Pine Bluff
DNQ (9)	Arkansas–Pine Bluff	8–10	Minus 5 point differential in season split with Alabama State
DNQ (10)	Prairie View A&M	5–13	
DNQ (11)	Florida A&M	4–14	
DNQ (12)	Mississippi Valley State	1–17	

== Schedule ==
Game	Time*	Matchup^{#}	Score	Television	Attendance
Quarterfinals – Wednesday, March 13
1	2:00 p.m.	No. 2 Alcorn State vs. No. 7 Alabama A&M	63–75	ESPN+	784
2	8:30 p.m.	No. 1 Grambling State vs. No. 8 Alabama State	56–50	ESPN+	2,176
Quarterfinals – Thursday, March 14
3	2:00 p.m.	No. 3 Texas Southern vs. No. 6 Jackson State	73–62	ESPN+	975
4	8:30 p.m.	No. 4 Southern vs. No. 5 Bethune–Cookman	58–73	ESPN+	624
Semifinals – Friday, March 15
5	2:00 p.m.	No. 1 Grambling State vs. No. 5 Bethune–Cookman	65–53	ESPN+	528
6	8:30 p.m.	No. 7 Alabama A&M vs. No. 3 Texas Southern	65–72	ESPN+	2,045
Championship – Saturday, March 16
7	8:30 p.m.	No. 1 Grambling State vs. No. 3 Texas Southern	75–66	ESPNU/ESPN+	2,108
*Game times in CDT. #-Rankings denote tournament seeding.

== Bracket ==
Quarterfinals; March 13–14
1	Grambling State	56
8	Alabama State	50
4	Southern	58
5	Bethune–Cookman	73
2	Alcorn State	63
7	Alabama A&M	75
3	Texas Southern	73
6	Jackson State	62

Semifinals; March 15
1	Grambling State	65
5	Bethune–Cookman	53
7	Alabama A&M	65
3	Texas Southern	72

Championship; March 16
1	Grambling State	75
3	Texas Southern	66
