= 2023–24 Alcorn State Braves basketball team =

American college basketball season

2023–24 Alcorn State Braves basketball
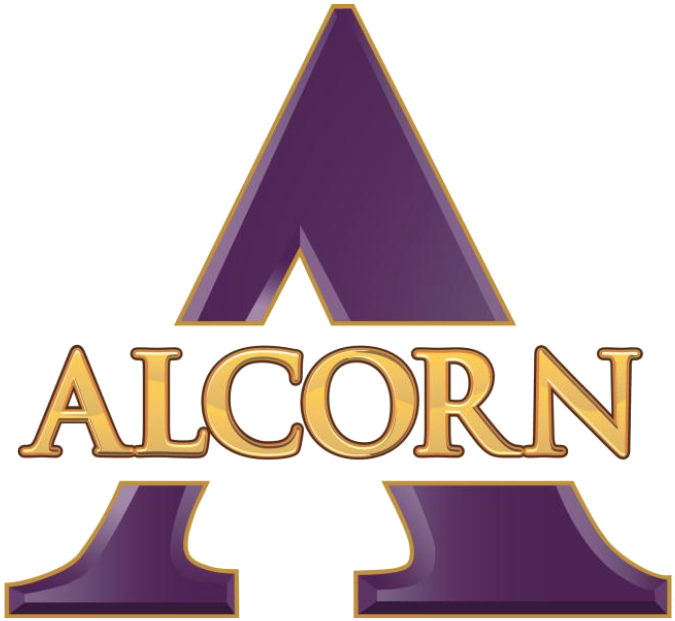
- Conference: Southwestern Athletic Conference
- Record: 14–18 (13–5 SWAC)
- Head coach: Landon Bussie (4th season)
- Assistant coaches: Andre Payne; Adam Schwartz; Troymain Crosby; Zach Nabers
- Home arena: Davey Whitney Complex

2023–24 SWAC men's basketball standings
| | Conf. | | | | Overall |
| Team | W | | L | PCT | W | | L | PCT |
|---|---|---|---|---|---|---|---|---|
| Grambling State † | 14 | – | 4 | .778 | 21 | – | 15 | .583 |
| Alcorn State | 13 | – | 5 | .722 | 14 | – | 18 | .438 |
| Texas Southern | 12 | – | 6 | .667 | 16 | – | 17 | .485 |
| Southern | 12 | – | 6 | .667 | 18 | – | 14 | .563 |
| Bethune–Cookman | 11 | – | 7 | .611 | 17 | – | 17 | .500 |
| Jackson State | 11 | – | 7 | .611 | 15 | – | 17 | .469 |
| Alabama A&M | 9 | – | 9 | .500 | 12 | – | 23 | .343 |
| Alabama State | 8 | – | 10 | .444 | 13 | – | 19 | .406 |
| Arkansas–Pine Bluff | 8 | – | 10 | .444 | 13 | – | 18 | .419 |
| Prairie View A&M | 5 | – | 13 | .278 | 10 | – | 21 | .323 |
| Florida A&M | 4 | – | 14 | .222 | 6 | – | 23 | .207 |
| Mississippi Valley State | 1 | – | 17 | .056 | 1 | – | 30 | .032 |
† 2024 SWAC tournament winner

The 2023–24 Alcorn State Braves basketball team represented Alcorn State University during the 2023–24 NCAA Division I men's basketball season. The Braves, led by fourth-year head coach Landon Bussie, played their home games at the Davey Whitney Complex in Lorman, Mississippi as members of the Southwestern Athletic Conference (SWAC). They finished the season 14–18, 13–5 in SWAC play, to finish in second place. As the No. 2 seed in the SWAC tournament, they lost to Alabama A&M in the quarterfinals.

== Previous season ==
The Braves finished the 2022–23 season 18–14, 15–3 in SWAC play, to finish as SWAC regular-season co-champions. In the SWAC tournament, they were upset in the quarterfinals by Texas Southern. As a regular-season conference champion who failed to win their conference tournament title, they received an automatic bid to the NIT, where they lost in the first round to North Texas.

== Roster ==
2023–24 Alcorn State Braves men's basketball team
Players
Coaches

| Pos. | # | Name | Height | Weight | Year | Hometown |
|---|---|---|---|---|---|---|
| F | 0 | Stephen Byard | 6 ft 8 in (2.03 m) | 215 lb (98 kg) | Jr | Atlantic City, NJ |
| F | 1 | Mike Pajeaud | 6 ft 2 in (1.88 m) | 183 lb (83 kg) | Jr | New Orleans, LA |
| G | 2 | Byron Joshua | 5 ft 10 in (1.78 m) | 160 lb (73 kg) | Sr | New Orleans, LA |
| G | 3 | Jalen Hawkins | 6 ft 4 in (1.93 m) | 185 lb (84 kg) | GS | The Bronx, NY |
| G | 4 | Roderick Jones | 6 ft 2 in (1.88 m) | 170 lb (77 kg) | Jr | Albany, GA |
| F | 5 | Willie Anderson | 6 ft 4 in (1.93 m) | 185 lb (84 kg) | So | New Orleans, LA |
| C | 7 | Alex Tsynkevich | 6 ft 10 in (2.08 m) | 235 lb (107 kg) | Jr | Minsk, Belarus |
| G | 8 | Jaylon Hicks | 6 ft 5 in (1.96 m) | 190 lb (86 kg) | Fr | New Orleans, LA |
| G | 9 | Jalyke Gaines-Wyatt | 6 ft 0 in (1.83 m) | 186 lb (84 kg) | Fr | Wyandanch, NY |
| G | 10 | Jeremiah Gambrell | 6 ft 3 in (1.91 m) | 190 lb (86 kg) | GS | Houston, TX |
| F | 11 | Rodrique Massenat | 6 ft 6 in (1.98 m) | 193 lb (88 kg) | GS | Trenton, NJ |
| G | 12 | Dekedran Thorn | 6 ft 4 in (1.93 m) | 183 lb (83 kg) | Sr | Houston, TX |
| F | 13 | Jeremiah Kendall | 6 ft 7 in (2.01 m) | 215 lb (98 kg) | Sr | The Bronx, NY |
| G | 14 | Cameron Butler | 6 ft 0 in (1.83 m) | 175 lb (79 kg) | Jr | Vicksburg, MS |
| F/C | 15 | Djahi Binet | 6 ft 7 in (2.01 m) | 215 lb (98 kg) | Jr | Nice, France |
| F/C | 20 | Trevon Stoutermire | 6 ft 8 in (2.03 m) | 200 lb (91 kg) | Jr | Birmingham, AL |
| G | 22 | Kevin Firle | 5 ft 11 in (1.8 m) | 180 lb (82 kg) | Fr | Collins, MS |
| G | 23 | Lataevyon Taylor | 6 ft 0 in (1.83 m) | 170 lb (77 kg) | Fr | Chicago, IL |
| G | 24 | Del Jayvien Harried | 6 ft 3 in (1.91 m) | 175 lb (79 kg) | Jr | Vicksburg, MS |

Head coach

- Landon Bussie (Xavier (LA))

Assistant coach(es)

- Andre Payne (Alabama A&M)
- Adam Schwartz (UNLV)
- Troymain Crosby (Alcorn State)
- Zach Nabers (Greenville)

Legend

- (C) Team captain
- (S) Suspended
- (I) Ineligible
- (W) Walk-on
- Injured
- Current redshirt

Roster
Last update: November 15, 2023

== Schedule and results ==
| Date time, TV | Rank^{#} | Opponent^{#} | Result | Record | High points | High rebounds | High assists | Site (attendance) city, state |
Exhibition
| October 30, 2023*; 7:00 p.m. | | Miles | W 70–60 | – | 14 – Joshua | 6 – Anderson | 4 – Joshua | Davey Whitney Complex (3,040); Lorman, MS |
Non-conference regular season
| November 6, 2023*; 7:00 p.m., SECN+/ESPN+ | | at No. 14 Arkansas | L 59–93 | 0–1 | 17 – Gambrell | 7 – Pajeaud | 2 – tied | Bud Walton Arena (19,200); Fayetteville, AR |
| November 8, 2023*; 7:00 p.m. | | Xavier (LA) | W 70–62 | 1–1 | 22 – Joshua | 9 – tied | 2 – tied | Davey Whitney Complex (1,234); Lorman, MS |
| November 14, 2023*; 7:00 p.m., ESPN+ | | at Arkansas State | L 86–100 | 1–2 | 28 – Kendall | 14 – Kendall | 3 – Hawkins | First National Bank Arena (2,388); Jonesboro, AR |
| November 16, 2023*; 7:00 p.m., ESPN+ | | at UAB | L 77–80 | 1–3 | 25 – Vasquez | 9 – Davis | 2 – tied | Bartow Arena (3,184); Birmingham, AL |
| November 19, 2023*; 5:00 p.m., BTN | | at No. 18 Michigan State; Acrisure Classic on-campus game | L 49–81 | 1–4 | 12 – Gambrell | 8 – Kendall | 5 – Joshua | Breslin Center (14,797); East Lansing, MI |
| November 21, 2023*; 7:00 p.m., ESPN+ | | at TCU | L 74–93 | 1–5 | 20 – Joshua | 6 – Thorn | 4 – tied | Schollmaier Arena (5,328); Fort Worth, TX |
| November 22, 2023*; 7:00 p.m., ESPN+ | | at UT Arlington; Acrisure Classic on-campus game | L 69–82 | 1–6 | 21 – Joshua | 5 – Kendall | 5 – Joshua | College Park Center (1,119); Arlington, TX |
| November 24, 2023*; 7:00 p.m., ACCN | | at Clemson | L 69–90 | 1–7 | 17 – Gambrell | 8 – Tsynkevich | 3 – Gaines-Wyatt | Littlejohn Coliseum (5,791); Clemson, SC |
| December 10, 2023*; 1:00 p.m., ESPN+ | | at VCU | L 58–86 | 1–8 | 17 – Kendall | 7 – Kendall | 4 – Joshua | Siegel Center (6,389); Richmond, VA |
| December 12, 2023*; 6:00 p.m., BTN | | at Maryland | L 65–105 | 1–9 | 14 – Joshua | 5 – tied | 2 – tied | Xfinity Center (10,008); College Park, MD |
| December 17, 2023*; 1:00 p.m., ESPN+ | | at Northern Iowa | L 82–100 | 1–10 | 23 – Kendall | 6 – Kendall | 7 – Jones | McLeod Center (3,201); Cedar Falls, IA |
| December 19, 2023*; 7:00 p.m., ESPN+ | | at Drake | L 55–92 | 1–11 | 19 – Kendall | 5 – Byard | 1 – tied | Knapp Center (2,715); Des Moines, IA |
| December 21, 2023*; 1:00 p.m., ESPN+ | | at George Washington | L 75–79 | 1–12 | 24 – Hawkins | 9 – Byard | 7 – Jones | Charles E. Smith Center (1,149); Washington, D.C. |
SWAC regular season
| January 6, 2024; 5:30 p.m. | | at Jackson State | L 80–88 | 1–13 (0–1) | 17 – Kendall | 10 – Kendall | 3 – Joshua | Williams Assembly Center (4,794); Jackson, MS |
| January 11, 2024; 7:30 p.m. | | at Alabama A&M | W 74–71 | 2–13 (1–1) | 15 – Kendall | 13 – Kendall | 6 – Joshua | Alabama A&M Events Center (3,239); Huntsville, AL |
| January 13, 2024; 4:00 p.m. | | at Alabama State | L 53–55 | 2–14 (1–2) | 19 – Kendall | 8 – Thorn | 5 – Joshua | Dunn–Oliver Acadome (2,524); Montgomery, AL |
| January 20, 2024; 3:00 p.m. | | Texas Southern | L 61–72 | 2–15 (1–3) | 17 – Gambrell | 6 – Binet | 5 – Joshua | Davey Whitney Complex; Lorman, MS |
| January 22, 2024; 6:00 p.m. | | Prairie View A&M | W 90–78 | 3–15 (2–3) | 18 – tied | 6 – tied | 3 – tied | Davey Whitney Complex (1,808); Lorman, MS |
| January 27, 2024; 3:00 p.m. | | at Florida A&M | W 76–67 | 4–15 (3–3) | 16 – Joshua | 9 – Byard | 6 – Joshua | Al Lawson Center (921); Tallahassee, FL |
| January 29, 2024; 8:00 p.m., ESPNU | | at Bethune–Cookman | W 70–67 | 5–15 (4–3) | 19 – Kendall | 6 – tied | 7 – Joshua | Moore Gymnasium (998); Daytona Beach, FL |
| February 3, 2024; 5:30 p.m. | | Southern | L 70–71 | 5–16 (4–4) | 19 – Kendall | 6 – tied | 6 – Joshua | Davey Whitney Complex (1,702); Lorman, MS |
| February 5, 2024; 7:30 p.m. | | Grambling State | L 67–78 | 5–17 (4–5) | 21 – Kendall | 6 – Byard | 3 – Gaines-Wyatt | Davey Whitney Complex (1,252); Lorman, MS |
| February 10, 2024; 5:30 p.m. | | at Arkansas–Pine Bluff | W 68–56 | 6–17 (5–5) | 16 – Kendall | 8 – tied | 6 – Joshua | H.O. Clemmons Arena (1,738); Pine Bluff, AR |
| February 12, 2024; 7:30 p.m. | | at Mississippi Valley State | W 72–55 | 7–17 (6–5) | 20 – Kendall | 6 – Binet | 7 – Joshua | Harrison HPER Complex (2,300); Itta Bena, MS |
| February 17, 2024; 3:00 p.m. | | Bethune–Cookman | W 69–54 | 8–27 (7–5) | 14 – Thorn | 10 – Byard | 7 – Joshua | Davey Whitney Complex (1,030); Lorman, MS |
| February 19, 2024; 7:30 p.m. | | Florida A&M | W 79–68 | 9–17 (8–5) | 18 – Kendall | 10 – Kendall | 3 – tied | Davey Whitney Complex (1,054); Lorman, MS |
| February 24, 2024; 3:00 p.m. | | Jackson State | W 87–73 ^{OT} | 10–17 (9–5) | 21 – Joshua | 9 – Pajeaud | 6 – Pajeaud | Davey Whitney Complex (1,759); Lorman, MS |
| March 2, 2024; 5:30 p.m. | | at Prairie View A&M | W 73–65 | 11–17 (10–5) | 21 – Gambrell | 5 – tied | 4 – Joshua | William J. Nicks Building (1,032); Prairie View, TX |
| March 4, 2024; 7:30 p.m. | | at Texas Southern | W 82–79 | 12–17 (11–5) | 27 – Kendall | 8 – Kendall | 3 – tied | H&PE Arena (2,836); Houston, TX |
| March 7, 2024; 7:30 p.m. | | Mississippi Valley State | W 74–67 | 13–17 (12–5) | 17 – Gambrell | 5 – Binet | 9 – Joshua | Davey Whitney Complex (753); Lorman, MS |
| March 9, 2024; 5:30 p.m. | | Arkansas–Pine Bluff | W 104–95 | 14–17 (13–5) | 28 – Gambrell | 11 – Thorn | 8 – Joshua | Davey Whitney Complex (635); Lorman, MS |
SWAC tournament
| March 13, 2024; 2:00 p.m., ESPN+ | (2) | vs. (7) Alabama A&M; Quarterfinals | L 63–75 | 14–18 | 16 – Gambrell | 8 – Kendall | 4 – Gaines-Wyatt | Bartow Arena (784); Birmingham, AL |
*Non-conference game. ^{#}Rankings from AP poll. (#) Tournament seedings in parentheses. All times are in Central.
