= 2023–24 Florida A&M Rattlers basketball team =

American college basketball season

2023–24 Florida A&M Rattlers basketball
- Conference: Southwestern Athletic Conference
- Record: 6–23 (4–14 SWAC)
- Head coach: Robert McCullum (7th season)
- Assistant coaches: Willie Powers III; Craig Brown; Rory Spencer
- Home arena: Al Lawson Center

2023–24 SWAC men's basketball standings
	Conf.				Overall
Team	W		L	PCT	W		L	PCT
Grambling State †	14	–	4	.778	21	–	15	.583
Alcorn State	13	–	5	.722	14	–	18	.438
Texas Southern	12	–	6	.667	16	–	17	.485
Southern	12	–	6	.667	18	–	14	.563
Bethune–Cookman	11	–	7	.611	17	–	17	.500
Jackson State	11	–	7	.611	15	–	17	.469
Alabama A&M	9	–	9	.500	12	–	23	.343
Alabama State	8	–	10	.444	13	–	19	.406
Arkansas–Pine Bluff	8	–	10	.444	13	–	18	.419
Prairie View A&M	5	–	13	.278	10	–	21	.323
Florida A&M	4	–	14	.222	6	–	23	.207
Mississippi Valley State	1	–	17	.056	1	–	30	.032
† 2024 SWAC tournament winner

The 2023–24 Florida A&M Rattlers basketball team represented Florida A&M University during the 2023–24 NCAA Division I men's basketball season. The Rattlers, led by seventh-year head coach Robert McCullum, played their home games at the Al Lawson Center in Tallahassee, Florida as members of the Southwestern Athletic Conference (SWAC). They finished the season 6–23, 4–14 in SWAC play, to finish in eleventh place, and thus they did not qualify to play in the SWAC tournament.

== Previous season ==
The Rattlers finished the 2022–23 season 7–22, 5–13 in SWAC play, to finish in eleventh place. They failed to qualify for the SWAC tournament, as only the top eight teams make it.

== Roster ==
2023–24 Florida A&M Rattlers men's basketball team
Players
Coaches

Pos.	#	Name	Height	Weight	Year	Previous school	Hometown
G	0	Dimingus Stevens	6 ft 6 in (1.98 m)	180 lb (82 kg)	Sr	Seton Hall	Washington, D.C.
G	1	Love Bettis	5 ft 11 in (1.8 m)	160 lb (73 kg)	Sr	North Carolina A&T	Pensacola, FL
G	2	Jordan Chatman	6 ft 4 in (1.93 m)	210 lb (95 kg)	Jr	Shelton State CC	Bessemer, AL
G	3	Morrell Schramm	6 ft 3 in (1.91 m)	220 lb (100 kg)	Jr	Chattanooga State CC	Chattanooga, TN
G	4	Hantz Louis-Jeune	6 ft 4 in (1.93 m)	175 lb (79 kg)	Sr	Northwest Kansas Tech	Lake Worth Beach, FL
F	5	Keith Lamar	6 ft 5 in (1.96 m)	210 lb (95 kg)	Sr	South Georgia State	Stockbridge, GA
F	10	Chase Barrs	6 ft 9 in (2.06 m)	230 lb (104 kg)	GS	Western Michigan	Tampa, FL
F	11	Roderick III Coffee	6 ft 4 in (1.93 m)	200 lb (91 kg)	So	Pensacola State	Painesville, OH
G	12	K'Jei Parker	6 ft 1 in (1.85 m)	190 lb (86 kg)	Fr	Winter Haven HS	Lakeland, FL
F	13	Shannon Grant	6 ft 10 in (2.08 m)	300 lb (136 kg)	Sr	Mercer	Sylacauga, AL
F	20	Matthew Webster	6 ft 7 in (2.01 m)	200 lb (91 kg)	RS Fr	Carrollwood Day School	Dade City, FL
G	23	Miles Hall	6 ft 3 in (1.91 m)	170 lb (77 kg)	So	Windermere HS	Windermere, FL
F	24	Ja'Derryus Eatmon	6 ft 10 in (2.08 m)	235 lb (107 kg)	Sr	Lawson State CC	Birmingham, AL
G	30	Adefemi Akinwole	6 ft 0 in (1.83 m)	160 lb (73 kg)	RS Fr	Norland HS	Miramar, FL
G	31	Colin McAllister	5 ft 9 in (1.75 m)	155 lb (70 kg)	Fr	Maclay School	Tallahassee, FL
G	34	Richard Mathews	6 ft 3 in (1.91 m)	195 lb (88 kg)	Jr	First Baptist Academy	Estero, FL
F	35	Alvin Tumblin	6 ft 5 in (1.96 m)	195 lb (88 kg)	Jr	Stetson	Sebring, FL
F	55	Alex Andrews	6 ft 7 in (2.01 m)	200 lb (91 kg)	RS Jr	Ocoee HS	Ocoee, FL

Head coach

- Robert McCullum (Birmingham–Southern)

Assistant coach(es)

- Willie Powers III (Georgia Southern)
- Craig Brown (Florida)
- Rory Spencer (Georgia Southern)

Legend

- (C) Team captain
- (S) Suspended
- (I) Ineligible
- (W) Walk-on
- Injured
- Current redshirt

Roster
Last update: December 6, 2023

== Schedule and results ==
Date time, TV	Rank^{#}	Opponent^{#}	Result	Record	High points	High rebounds	High assists	Site (attendance) city, state
Non-conference regular season
November 7, 2023*; 9:00 p.m., FS1		at No. 8 Creighton	L 54–105	0–1	16 – Lamar	4 – 2 tied	2 – 2 tied	CHI Health Center Omaha (16,117); Omaha, NE
November 9, 2023*; 8:00 p.m., B1G+		at Nebraska	L 54–81	0–2	13 – Parker	6 – Parker	3 – Parker	Pinnacle Bank Arena (13,766); Lincoln, NE
November 14, 2023*; 7:00 p.m., SECN+/ESPN+		at Florida	L 68–89	0–3	24 – Bettis	9 – Lamar	4 – Eatmon	O'Connell Center (6,675); Gainesville, FL
November 20, 2023*; 8:00 p.m., ESPN+		Oregon; Pac-12/SWAC Legacy Series	L 54–67	0–4	18 – 2 tied	7 – Lamar	4 – Louis-Jeune	Al Lawson Center (2,587); Tallahassee, FL
November 29, 2023*; 7:00 p.m., Rattlers+		Albany State	L 85–92 ^{2OT}	0–5	29 – Lamar	11 – Lamar	11 – Parker	Al Lawson Center (302); Tallahassee, FL
December 6, 2023*; 7:00 p.m., ESPN+		at Presbyterian	W 65–60	1–5	22 – Bettis	7 – Lamar	5 – Coffee III	Templeton Physical Education Center (308); Clinton, SC
December 9, 2023*; 2:00 p.m., Rattlers+		LeMoyne–Owen	W 108–78	2–5	19 – Louis-Jeune	10 – Parker	8 – Coffee III	Al Lawson Center (157); Tallahassee, FL
December 16, 2023*; 4:30 p.m., B1G		vs. Iowa	L 52–88	2–6	11 – Parker	5 – 3 tied	2 – 2 tied	Wells Fargo Arena (14,786); Des Moines, IA
December 17, 2023*; 6:00 p.m., ESPN+		at Iowa State	L 58–96	2–7	27 – Lamar	8 – 2 tied	4 – Schramm	Hilton Coliseum (13,081); Ames, IA
December 21, 2023*; 7:00 p.m., ESPN+		at UCF	L 56–69	2–8	14 – Coffee III	11 – Lamar	8 – Coffee III	Addition Financial Arena (5,066); Orlando, FL
December 30, 2023*; 2:00 p.m., ESPN+/SECN+		at South Carolina	L 62–94	2–9	14 – Eatmon	5 – Lamar	4 – 2 tied	Colonial Life Arena (11,070); Columbia, SC
SWAC regular season
January 6, 2024; 4:00 p.m.		at Bethune–Cookman	L 86–98	2–10 (0–1)	32 – Speer	6 – 2 tied	6 – Speer	Moore Gymnasium (992); Daytona Beach, FL
January 13, 2024; 4:00 p.m., Rattlers+		Southern	L 65–74	2–11 (0–2)	16 – Louis-Jeune	9 – Louis-Jeune	4 – Speer	Al Lawson Center (1,289); Tallahassee, FL
January 15, 2024; 8:00 p.m., Rattlers+		Grambling State	L 52–65	2–12 (0–3)	15 – Speer	7 – Louis-Jeune	4 – 2 tied	Al Lawson Center (897); Tallahassee, FL
January 20, 2024; 6:30 p.m.		at Arkansas–Pine Bluff	L 97–99	2–13 (0–4)	29 – Speer	8 – Lamar	9 – Speer	H.O. Clemmons Arena (2,944); Pine Bluff, AR
January 22, 2024; 8:30 p.m.		at Mississippi Valley State	W 81–70	3–13 (1–4)	19 – Speer	7 – Speer	4 – Lamar	Harrison HPER Complex (1,305); Itta Bena, MS
January 27, 2024; 4:00 p.m., Rattlers+		Alcorn State	L 67–76	3–14 (1–5)	19 – Speer	6 – Chatman	4 – 2 tied	Al Lawson Center (921); Tallahassee, FL
January 29, 2024; 8:00 p.m., Rattlers+		Jackson State	W 88–86	4–14 (2–5)	27 – Lamar	8 – Grant	7 – Coffee III	Al Lawson Center (1,021); Tallahassee, FL
February 3, 2024; 6:00 p.m.		at Alabama A&M	L 61–73	4–15 (2–6)	22 – Speer	8 – Grant	6 – Speer	Alabama A&M Events Center (3,913); Huntsville, AL
February 5, 2024; 8:30 p.m.		at Alabama State	L 53–62	4–16 (2–7)	17 – Speer	10 – Chatman	4 – Coffee III	Dunn–Oliver Acadome (2,727); Montgomery, AL
February 10, 2024; 4:00 p.m., Rattlers+		Texas Southern	L 75–78 ^{OT}	4–17 (2–8)	18 – Lamar	10 – Lamar	7 – Speer	Al Lawson Center (574); Tallahassee, FL
February 12, 2024; 9:00 p.m., ESPNU		Prairie View A&M	L 58–61	4–18 (2–9)	15 – Grant	16 – Webster	8 – Parker	Al Lawson Center (402); Tallahassee, FL
February 17, 2024; 6:30 p.m.		at Jackson State	L 55–77	4–19 (2–10)	12 – Grant	5 – Chatman	3 – Parker	Williams Assembly Center (3,244); Jackson, MS
February 19, 2024; 8:30 p.m.		at Alcorn State	L 68–79	4–20 (2–11)	15 – Grant	7 – Grant	2 – Grant	Davey Whitney Complex (1,054); Lorman, MS
February 24, 2024; 4:00 p.m., Rattlers+		Alabama State	W 73–65	5–20 (3–11)	22 – Lamar	8 – Chatman	3 – 3 tied	Al Lawson Center (724); Tallahassee, FL
February 26, 2024; 8:00 p.m., Rattlers+		Alabama A&M	W 76–58	6–20 (4–11)	29 – Lamar	9 – Grant	4 – Speer	Al Lawson Center (2,287); Tallahassee, FL
March 2, 2024; 6:30 p.m.		at Grambling State	L 68–75	6–21 (4–12)	24 – Lamar	9 – Chatman	7 – Speer	Fredrick C. Hobdy Assembly Center (1,533); Grambling, LA
March 4, 2024; 9:00 p.m.		at Southern	L 44–58	6–22 (4–13)	14 – 2 tied	7 – Lamar	3 – Lamar	F. G. Clark Center (5,689); Baton Rouge, LA
March 9, 2024; 4:00 p.m., Rattlers+		Bethune–Cookman	L 66–67 ^{OT}	6–23 (4–14)	17 – Lamar	8 – Barrs	5 – 2 tied	Al Lawson Center (1,121); Tallahassee, FL
*Non-conference game. ^{#}Rankings from AP poll. (#) Tournament seedings in parentheses. All times are in Eastern.
