= 2023–24 Alabama State Hornets basketball team =

Basketball team season

2023–24 Alabama State Hornets basketball
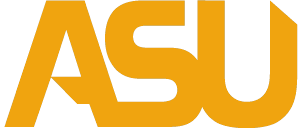
- Conference: Southwestern Athletic Conference
- Record: 13–19 (8–10 SWAC)
- Head coach: Tony Madlock (2nd season)
- Assistant coaches: Tyrone Levett; Mardracus Wade; Ed Stephens
- Home arena: Dunn–Oliver Acadome

2023–24 SWAC men's basketball standings
	Conf.				Overall
Team	W		L	PCT	W		L	PCT
Grambling State †	14	–	4	.778	21	–	15	.583
Alcorn State	13	–	5	.722	14	–	18	.438
Texas Southern	12	–	6	.667	16	–	17	.485
Southern	12	–	6	.667	18	–	14	.563
Bethune–Cookman	11	–	7	.611	17	–	17	.500
Jackson State	11	–	7	.611	15	–	17	.469
Alabama A&M	9	–	9	.500	12	–	23	.343
Alabama State	8	–	10	.444	13	–	19	.406
Arkansas–Pine Bluff	8	–	10	.444	13	–	18	.419
Prairie View A&M	5	–	13	.278	10	–	21	.323
Florida A&M	4	–	14	.222	6	–	23	.207
Mississippi Valley State	1	–	17	.056	1	–	30	.032
† 2024 SWAC tournament winner

The 2023–24 Alabama State Hornets basketball team represented Alabama State University during the 2023–24 NCAA Division I men's basketball season. The Hornets, led by second-year head coach Tony Madlock, played their home games at the Dunn–Oliver Acadome in Montgomery, Alabama as members of the Southwestern Athletic Conference (SWAC). They finished the season 13–19, 8–10 in SWAC play, to finish in a tie for eighth place. As the No. 8 seed in the SWAC tournament, they lost to Grambling State in the quarterfinals.

== Previous season ==
The Hornets finished the 2022–23 season 8–23, 6–12 in SWAC play, to finish in a tie for ninth place. They failed to qualify for the SWAC tournament, since only the top eight teams are qualified to compete.

== Roster ==
2023–24 Alabama State Hornets men's basketball team
Players
Coaches

Pos.	#	Name	Height	Weight	Year	Previous school	Hometown
F	0	D'Ante Bass	6 ft 6 in (1.98 m)	205 lb (93 kg)	So	Georgetown	Savannah, GA
G	1	Amarr Knox	6 ft 3 in (1.91 m)	170 lb (77 kg)	RS Fr	Bartlett High School	Memphis, TN
G	3	CJ Hines	6 ft 2 in (1.88 m)	185 lb (84 kg)	Jr	Faulkner	Atlanta, GA
G	5	Kendal Parker	6 ft 4 in (1.93 m)	180 lb (82 kg)	So	Carver High School	Montgomery, AL
F	10	Jabari Williams	6 ft 11 in (2.11 m)	205 lb (93 kg)	Jr	Indian River State	St. John's, Antigua
G	11	Micah Octave	6 ft 5 in (1.96 m)	185 lb (84 kg)	Jr	Indian River State	Boca Raton, FL
G	12	Londan Coleman	6 ft 3 in (1.91 m)	190 lb (86 kg)	Jr	Silverado High School	Las Vegas, NV
G	13	Tadarius Jacobs	6 ft 2 in (1.88 m)	185 lb (84 kg)	RS So	Memphis	Memphis, TN
G	20	TJ Madlock	6 ft 3 in (1.91 m)	190 lb (86 kg)	Jr	South Carolina State	Memphis, TN
F	22	Darrell Reed	6 ft 8 in (2.03 m)	215 lb (98 kg)	RS Fr	Hammond High School	Hammond, IN
F	23	Eric Coleman	6 ft 8 in (2.03 m)	210 lb (95 kg)	Sr	South Plains College	Buford, GA
G	24	Isaiah Range	6 ft 4 in (1.93 m)	215 lb (98 kg)	Sr	Tarleton State	Cedar Hill, TX
F	25	Jasteven Walker	6 ft 10 in (2.08 m)	190 lb (86 kg)	So	Fayette Ware High School	Oakland, TN
C	35	Ubong Okon	7 ft 1 in (2.16 m)	230 lb (104 kg)	So	Georgia Highlands	Akwa Ibom, Nigeria
G	55	Sean Smith	6 ft 3 in (1.91 m)	185 lb (84 kg)	Jr	John A. Logan	Louisville, KY

Head coach

- Tony Madlock (Memphis)

Assistant coach(es)

- Tyrone Levett (Alabama State)
- Mardracus Wade (Arkansas)
- Ed Stephens (South Carolina State)

Legend

- (C) Team captain
- (S) Suspended
- (I) Ineligible
- (W) Walk-on
- Injured
- Current redshirt

Roster
Last update: November 8, 2023

== Schedule and results ==
Date time, TV	Rank^{#}	Opponent^{#}	Result	Record	High points	High rebounds	High assists	Site (attendance) city, state
Exhibition
October 30, 2023*; 6:00 p.m.		LaGrange	W 90–69	–	17 – Smith	7 – 2 tied	4 – Hines	Dunn–Oliver Acadome (455); Montgomery, AL
Non-conference regular season
November 6, 2023*; 7:30 p.m., SECN+/ESPN+		at Ole Miss	L 59–69	0–1	12 – 2 tied	8 – Madlock	4 – Smith	SJB Pavilion (6,141); Oxford, MS
November 10, 2023*; 7:00 p.m., Peacock		at Iowa	L 67–98	0–2	23 – Madlock	9 – Walker	5 – Hines	Carver–Hawkeye Arena (8,814); Iowa City, IA
November 14, 2023*; 6:00 p.m.		Oglethorpe	W 115–51	1–2	18 – Bass	10 – Bass	5 – Madlock	Dunn–Oliver Acadome (567); Montgomery, AL
November 17, 2023*; 7:00 p.m., ESPN+		at Memphis	L 75-92	1-3	19 – Hines	6 – Bass	4 – Hines	FedExForum (11,289); Memphis, TN
November 22, 2023*; 6:30 p.m., ESPN+		at Samford; Samford MTE	L 67–99	1–4	15 – Range	8 – Okon	5 – Hines	Pete Hanna Center (866); Homewood, AL
November 24, 2023*; 1:00 p.m.		vs. North Carolina A&T; Samford MTE	W 88–73	2–4	25 – Madlock	8 – Octave	6 – Hines	Pete Hanna Center (373); Homewood, AL
November 25, 2023*; 12:00 p.m.		vs. Merrimack; Samford MTE	W 66–60 ^{OT}	3–4	16 – Madlock	10 – Okon	3 – Hines	Pete Hanna Center (136); Homewood, AL
December 3, 2023*; 6:00 p.m.		Mississippi University	W 80–60	4–4	18 – Parker	5 – Coleman	5 – Hines	Dunn–Oliver Acadome (766); Montgomery, AL
December 13, 2023*; 7:00 p.m., ESPN+/SECN+		at LSU	L 56–74	4–5	18 – Madlock	14 – Okon	3 – 2 tied	Pete Maravich Assembly Center (7,104); Baton Rouge, LA
December 19, 2023*; 6:00 p.m., ESPN+		USC; Pac-12/SWAC Legacy Series	L 59–79	4–6	17 – Madlock	9 – Okon	3 – Madlock	Dunn–Oliver Acadome (7,500); Montgomery, AL
December 22, 2023*; 7:00 p.m., ESPN+/SECN+		at Auburn	L 62–82	4–7	16 – 2 tied	7 – Okon	1 – 7 tied	Neville Arena (9,121); Auburn, AL
December 29, 2023*; 6:00 p.m., ESPN+		at South Florida	L 70–73	4–8	14 – Hines	11 – Octave	5 – Range	Yuengling Center (3,284); Tampa, FL
January 2, 2024*; 6:00 p.m.		Johnson	W 84–53	5–8	17 – Knox	8 – Parker	3 – 2 tied	Dunn–Oliver Acadome (455); Montgomery, AL
SWAC regular season
January 6, 2024; 7:30 p.m.		at Mississippi Valley State	W 54–51	6–8 (1–0)	13 – Madlock	7 – 2 tied	2 – 2 tied	Harrison HPER Complex (2,315); Itta Bena, MS
January 8, 2024; 6:00 p.m.		at Arkansas–Pine Bluff	W 83–72	7–8 (2–0)	21 – Hines	10 – Okon	5 – Hines	H.O. Clemmons Arena (1,385); Pine Bluff, AR
January 11, 2024; 7:30 p.m.		Jackson State	L 63–73	7–9 (2–1)	20 – Madlock	8 – 2 tied	3 – Hines	Dunn–Oliver Acadome (3,100); Montgomery, AL
January 13, 2024; 4:00 p.m.		Alcorn State	W 55–53	8–9 (3–1)	14 – Madlock	8 – Okon	3 – Smith	Dunn–Oliver Acadome (2,524); Montgomery, AL
January 15, 2024; 6:30 p.m.		vs. Alabama A&M; Bridge Builder Classic	W 72–55	9–9 (4–1)	20 – Range	7 – Octave	4 – Hines	Mitchell Center (2,900); Mobile, AL
January 27, 2024; 5:30 p.m.		at Prairie View A&M	W 74–67	10–9 (5–1)	30 – Madlock	14 – Octave	3 – Madlock	William J. Nicks Building (1,175); Prairie View, TX
January 29, 2024; 7:30 p.m.		at Texas Southern	L 55–56	10–10 (5–2)	17 – Madlock	9 – Madlock	2 – 2 tied	H&PE Arena (1,300); Houston, TX
February 3, 2024; 4:00 p.m.		Bethune–Cookman	L 68–79	10–11 (5–3)	17 – Madlock	7 – Okon	3 – Hines	Dunn–Oliver Acadome (3,200); Montgomery, AL
February 5, 2024; 7:30 p.m.		Florida A&M	W 62–53	11–11 (6–3)	19 – Hines	9 – Okon	3 – Madlock	Dunn–Oliver Acadome (2,727); Montgomery, AL
February 10, 2024; 5:30 p.m.		at Grambling State	L 68–74	11–12 (6–4)	22 – Madlock	10 – Okon	3 – Hines	Fredrick C. Hobdy Assembly Center (781); Grambling, LA
February 12, 2024; 8:00 p.m.		at Southern	L 62–73	11–13 (6–5)	19 – Knox	8 – Octave	7 – Madlock	F. G. Clark Center (3,967); Baton Rouge, LA
February 17, 2024; 4:00 p.m.		Arkansas–Pine Bluff	L 74–80	11–14 (6–6)	11 – 3 tied	12 – Okon	2 – Hines	Dunn–Oliver Acadome (3,512); Montgomery, AL
February 19, 2024; 7:30 p.m.		Mississippi Valley State	W 61–46	12–14 (7–6)	21 – Madlock	7 – Okon	3 – 2 tied	Dunn–Oliver Acadome; Montgomery, AL
February 24, 2024; 3:00 p.m.		at Florida A&M	L 65–73	12–15 (7–7)	20 – Madlock	8 – Madlock	3 – 2 tied	Al Lawson Center (724); Tallahassee, FL
February 26, 2024; 6:30 p.m.		at Bethune–Cookman	L 84–90 ^{OT}	12–16 (7–8)	23 – Madlock	8 – 2 tied	4 – 2 tied	Moore Gymnasium (917); Daytona Beach, FL
March 2, 2024; 5:00 p.m.		at Alabama A&M	L 53–58	12–17 (7–9)	17 – Range	5 – 3 tied	4 – 2 tied	Alabama A&M Events Center (6,389); Huntsville, AL
March 7, 2024; 7:30 p.m.		Southern	L 57–65	12–18 (7–10)	14 – Range	5 – Octave	3 – Madlock	Dunn–Oliver Acadome (2,437); Montgomery, AL
March 9, 2024; 4:00 p.m.		Grambling State	W 87–84 ^{2OT}	13–18 (8–10)	23 – Madlock	9 – Okon	6 – Knox	Dunn–Oliver Acadome (2,578); Montgomery, AL
SWAC tournament
March 13, 2024; 8:30 p.m., ESPN+	(8)	vs. (1) Grambling State; Quarterfinals	L 50–56	13–19	15 – Madlock	8 – Octave	4 – Hines	Bartow Arena (2,176); Birmingham, AL
*Non-conference game. ^{#}Rankings from AP poll. (#) Tournament seedings in parentheses. All times are in Central.
