= 2023–24 Jackson State Tigers basketball team =

American college basketball season

2023–24 Jackson State Tigers basketball
- Conference: Southwestern Athletic Conference
- Record: 15–17 (11–7 SWAC)
- Head coach: Mo Williams (2nd season)
- Associate head coach: Trey Johnson
- Assistant coaches: Tyler Adams; Keith Williams
- Home arena: Williams Assembly Center

2023–24 SWAC men's basketball standings
	Conf.				Overall
Team	W		L	PCT	W		L	PCT
Grambling State †	14	–	4	.778	21	–	15	.583
Alcorn State	13	–	5	.722	14	–	18	.438
Texas Southern	12	–	6	.667	16	–	17	.485
Southern	12	–	6	.667	18	–	14	.563
Bethune–Cookman	11	–	7	.611	17	–	17	.500
Jackson State	11	–	7	.611	15	–	17	.469
Alabama A&M	9	–	9	.500	12	–	23	.343
Alabama State	8	–	10	.444	13	–	19	.406
Arkansas–Pine Bluff	8	–	10	.444	13	–	18	.419
Prairie View A&M	5	–	13	.278	10	–	21	.323
Florida A&M	4	–	14	.222	6	–	23	.207
Mississippi Valley State	1	–	17	.056	1	–	30	.032
† 2024 SWAC tournament winner

The 2023–24 Jackson State Tigers basketball team represented Jackson State University during the 2023–24 NCAA Division I men's basketball season. The Tigers, led by second-year head coach Mo Williams, played their home games at the Williams Assembly Center in Jackson, Mississippi, as members of the Southwestern Athletic Conference (SWAC). They finished the season 15–17, 11–7 in SWAC play, to finish in a tie for fifth place. As the No. 6 seed in the SWAC tournament, they lost to Texas Southern in the quarterfinals.

== Previous season ==
The Tigers finished the 2022–23 season 14–19, 12–6 in SWAC play, to finish 3rd. As the No. 3 seed, they defeated No. 6 seed Prairie View A&M in the quarterfinals of the SWAC tournament before falling to No. 2 seeded Grambling State in the semifinals.

== Roster ==
2023–24 Jackson State Tigers men's basketball team
Players
Coaches

Pos.	#	Name	Height	Weight	Year	Hometown
F	0	Keijuan Watson	6 ft 7 in (2.01 m)	179 lb (81 kg)	Jr	Gulfport, MS
F	0	Zeke Cook	6 ft 6 in (1.98 m)	220 lb (100 kg)	Jr	Starkville, MS
G	2	Ken Evans Jr.	6 ft 5 in (1.96 m)	200 lb (91 kg)	RS Jr	Jackson, MS
G/F	3	Jayme Mitchell	6 ft 5 in (1.96 m)	185 lb (84 kg)	Jr	Jackson, MS
G	4	Coltie Young	6 ft 3 in (1.91 m)	201 lb (91 kg)	Jr	Starkville, MS
G	5	Keiveon Hunt	5 ft 11 in (1.8 m)	176 lb (80 kg)	So	Jackson, MS
G	10	Chase Adams	5 ft 8 in (1.73 m)	144 lb (65 kg)	Sr	Chicago, IL
G	11	Keionte Cornelius	5 ft 10 in (1.78 m)	172 lb (78 kg)	Jr	Spring, TX
G	12	Delyle Williams	6 ft 2 in (1.88 m)	181 lb (82 kg)	Fr	Compton, CA
F	13	Romelle Mansel	6 ft 9 in (2.06 m)	195 lb (88 kg)	Sr	Los Angeles, CA
G/F	14	Jeremiah Williamson	6 ft 2 in (1.88 m)	196 lb (89 kg)	Fr	Fayetteville, GA
C	21	Tamorrian Grigsby	6 ft 7 in (2.01 m)	210 lb (95 kg)	Fr	Mesquite, TX
G	22	Jalani Bell	6 ft 0 in (1.83 m)	185 lb (84 kg)	Jr	Jackson, MS
F/C	23	Jordan O'Neal	6 ft 7 in (2.01 m)	200 lb (91 kg)	Sr	Mobile, AL
G	24	Daeshun Ruffin	5 ft 10 in (1.78 m)	150 lb (68 kg)	Jr	Jackson, MS
F	30	David Mcdaniel	6 ft 9 in (2.06 m)	210 lb (95 kg)	Jr	Alpharetta, GA
C	32	Treyon Johnson	6 ft 11 in (2.11 m)	285 lb (129 kg)	Sr	Chicago, IL
G	55	Cowandric Samuel	6 ft 3 in (1.91 m)	200 lb (91 kg)	RS So	Jackson, MS

Head coach

- Mo Williams (Alabama)

Assistant coach(es)

- Trey Johnson (Jackson State)
- Tyler Adams (Georgetown)
- Keith Williams (Arkansas–Pine Bluff)

Legend

- (C) Team captain
- (S) Suspended
- (I) Ineligible
- (W) Walk-on
- Injured
- Current redshirt

Roster
Last update: September 15, 2023

== Schedule and results ==
Date time, TV	Rank^{#}	Opponent^{#}	Result	Record	Site (attendance) city, state
Exhibition
November 1, 2023*; 7:00 p.m.		Rhodes	W 116–68	–	Williams Assembly Center (500); Jackson, MS
Non-conference regular season
November 6, 2023*; 8:00 p.m., ESPN+		at Memphis	L 77–94	0–1	FedExForum (10,912); Memphis, TN
November 8, 2023*; 10:00 p.m., ESPN+		at San Diego	L 61–87	0–2	Jenny Craig Pavilion (422); San Diego, CA
November 10, 2023*; 10:00 p.m., ESPN+		at California Baptist	L 66–80	0–3	Fowler Events Center (5,096); Riverside, CA
November 14, 2023*; 10:00 p.m., ESPN+		at Loyola Marymount	L 66–88	0–4	Gersten Pavilion (1,015); Los Angeles, CA
November 16, 2023*; 8:00 p.m., ESPN+		at Tulsa	L 52–72	0–5	Reynolds Center (2,754); Tulsa, OK
November 19, 2023*; 6:00 p.m., SECN+		at Missouri	W 73–72	1–5	Mizzou Arena (9,690); Columbia, MO
November 25, 2023*; 12:00 p.m., FS2		at Georgetown	L 81–88	1–6	Capital One Arena (4,126); Washington, D.C.
November 28, 2023*; 8:30 p.m., ESPN+		at Arkansas State	W 75–71	2–6	First National Bank Arena (2,229); Jonesboro, AR
December 9, 2023*; 3:00 p.m., ESPN+		at No. 3 Houston	L 55–89	2–7	Fertitta Center (7,122); Houston, TX
December 16, 2023*; 11:00 p.m., ESPNU		vs. Howard; CP3 HBCU Challenge	W 81–74	3–7	Michelob Ultra Arena (1,306); Las Vegas, NV
December 17, 2023*; 7:30 p.m., ESPNU		vs. North Carolina A&T; CP3 HBCU Challenge	W 68–60	4–7	Michelob Ultra Arena; Las Vegas, NV
December 20, 2023*; 8:00 p.m., ESPN+		at No. 15 Gonzaga	L 76–100	4–8	McCarthey Athletic Center (6,000); Spokane, WA
December 29, 2023*; 7:00 p.m., Peacock		at Northwestern	L 63–74	4–9	Welsh–Ryan Arena (4,938); Evanston, IL
SWAC regular season
January 6, 2024; 5:30 p.m.		Alcorn State	W 88–80	5–9 (1–0)	Williams Assembly Center (4,794); Jackson, MS
January 11, 2024; 7:30 p.m.		at Alabama State	W 73–63	6–9 (2–0)	Dunn–Oliver Acadome (3,100); Montgomery, AL
January 13, 2024; 5:00 p.m.		at Alabama A&M	W 75–67	7–9 (3–0)	Alabama A&M Events Center (2,507); Huntsville, AL
January 20, 2024; 5:30 p.m.		Prairie View A&M	L 62–71	7–10 (3–1)	Williams Assembly Center (3,015); Jackson, MS
January 22, 2024; 8:00 p.m., ESPNU		Texas Southern	W 73–64	8–10 (4–1)	Williams Assembly Center (1,652); Jackson, MS
January 27, 2024; 4:00 p.m.		at Bethune–Cookman	L 71–82	8–11 (4–2)	Moore Gymnasium (915); Daytona Beach, FL
January 29, 2024; 8:00 p.m.		at Florida A&M	L 86–88	8–12 (4–3)	Al Lawson Center (1,021); Tallahassee, FL
February 3, 2024; 12:00 p.m.		vs. Grambling State; The Invesco QQQ Legacy Classic	L 62–70	8–13 (4–4)	Prudential Center; Newark, NJ
February 5, 2024; 8:00 p.m., ESPNU		Southern	L 63–72	8–14 (4–5)	Williams Assembly Center (2,789); Jackson, MS
February 10, 2024; 6:00 p.m.		at Mississippi Valley State	W 77–69	9–14 (5–5)	Harrison HPER Complex (2,412); Itta Bena, MS
February 12, 2024; 7:30 p.m.		at Arkansas–Pine Bluff	W 76–63	10–14 (6–5)	H.O. Clemmons Arena (2,638); Pine Bluff, AR
February 17, 2024; 5:30 p.m.		Florida A&M	W 77–55	11–14 (7–5)	Williams Assembly Center (3,244); Jackson, MS
February 19, 2024; 7:30 p.m.		Bethune–Cookman	W 61–60	12–14 (8–5)	Williams Assembly Center (967); Jackson, MS
February 24, 2024; 3:00 p.m.		at Alcorn State	L 73–87 ^{OT}	12–15 (8–6)	Davey Whitney Complex (1,759); Lorman, MS
March 2, 2024; 5:00 p.m.		at Texas Southern	L 70–80	12–16 (8–7)	H&PE Arena (4,036); Houston, TX
March 4, 2024; 7:30 p.m.		at Prairie View A&M	W 79–74	13–16 (9–7)	William J. Nicks Building (929); Prairie View, TX
March 7, 2024; 7:30 p.m.		Arkansas–Pine Bluff	W 89–84	14–16 (10–7)	Williams Assembly Center (1,866); Jackson, MS
March 9, 2024; 5:30 p.m.		Mississippi Valley State	W 68–67	15–16 (11–7)	Williams Assembly Center (3,963); Jackson, MS
SWAC tournament
March 14, 2024; 2:00 p.m., ESPN+	(6)	vs. (3) Texas Southern; Quarterfinals	L 62–73	15–17	Bartow Arena (975); Birmingham, AL
*Non-conference game. ^{#}Rankings from AP poll. (#) Tournament seedings in parentheses. All times are in Central.
