= 2023–24 Prairie View A&M Panthers basketball team =

American college basketball season

2023–24 Prairie View A&M Panthers basketball
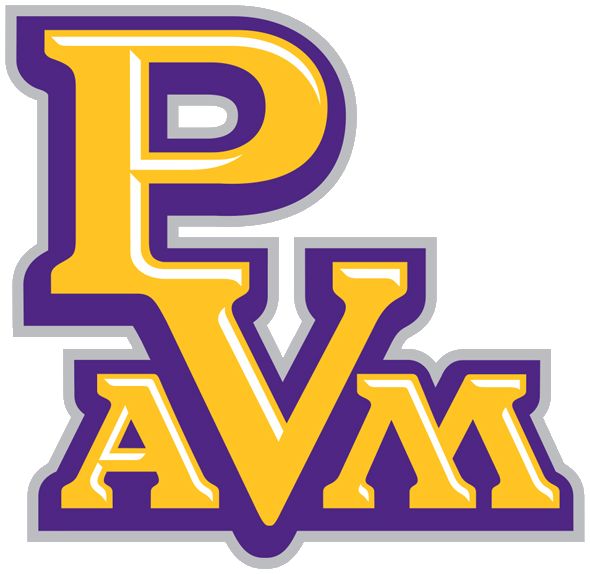
- Conference: Southwestern Athletic Conference
- Record: 10–21 (5–13 SWAC)
- Head coach: Byron Smith (8th season)
- Assistant coaches: Spencer Robertson; Johnnie Williams; Jacob Galindo
- Home arena: William Nicks Building

2023–24 SWAC men's basketball standings
	Conf.				Overall
Team	W		L	PCT	W		L	PCT
Grambling State †	14	–	4	.778	21	–	15	.583
Alcorn State	13	–	5	.722	14	–	18	.438
Texas Southern	12	–	6	.667	16	–	17	.485
Southern	12	–	6	.667	18	–	14	.563
Bethune–Cookman	11	–	7	.611	17	–	17	.500
Jackson State	11	–	7	.611	15	–	17	.469
Alabama A&M	9	–	9	.500	12	–	23	.343
Alabama State	8	–	10	.444	13	–	19	.406
Arkansas–Pine Bluff	8	–	10	.444	13	–	18	.419
Prairie View A&M	5	–	13	.278	10	–	21	.323
Florida A&M	4	–	14	.222	6	–	23	.207
Mississippi Valley State	1	–	17	.056	1	–	30	.032
† 2024 SWAC tournament winner

The 2023–24 Prairie View A&M Panthers basketball team represented Prairie View A&M University during the 2023–24 NCAA Division I men's basketball season. The Panthers, led by eighth-year head coach Byron Smith, played their home games at the William Nicks Building in Prairie View, Texas as members of the Southwestern Athletic Conference (SWAC). They finished the season 10–21, 5–13 in SWAC play, to finish in tenth place, and thus they did not qualify to play in the SWAC tournament.

== Previous season ==
The Panthers finished the 2022–23 season 13–19, 9–9 in SWAC play, to finish in sixth place. They lost in overtime to Jackson State in the quarterfinals of the SWAC tournament.

== Roster ==
2023–24 Prairie View A&M Panthers men's basketball team
Players
Coaches

Pos.	#	Name	Height	Weight	Year	Hometown
G	0	Kevin McGaskey	6 ft 0 in (1.83 m)	170 lb (77 kg)	Sr	Missouri City, TX
G	1	Charles Jr. Lane	6 ft 5 in (1.96 m)	195 lb (88 kg)	GS	Eatonville, FL
PF	3	Brian Myles	6 ft 7 in (2.01 m)	200 lb (91 kg)	Jr	Shreveport, LA
G	4	Charles IV Smith	6 ft 5 in (1.96 m)	185 lb (84 kg)	GS	Atlanta, GA
G	5	Ronell Jr. Giles	6 ft 5 in (1.96 m)	200 lb (91 kg)	Sr	Brandywine, MD
G	10	Jonathan Nash	6 ft 2 in (1.88 m)	—	Jr	Katy, TX
G	11	Nicholas Gazelas	6 ft 4 in (1.93 m)	185 lb (84 kg)	GS	Humble, TX
PG	12	Orlando Jr. Horton	5 ft 9 in (1.75 m)	140 lb (64 kg)	Fr	Houston, TX
G	13	Justin Nimmer	6 ft 6 in (1.98 m)	195 lb (88 kg)	GS	DeSoto, TX
G	14	Javontae Hopkins	6 ft 0 in (1.83 m)	165 lb (75 kg)	GS	Houston, TX
F	15	Syrus Grisby	6 ft 8 in (2.03 m)	225 lb (102 kg)	GS	Oklahoma City, OK
G	22	Mark-Anthony McReed	6 ft 6 in (1.98 m)	200 lb (91 kg)	Jr	Hollywood, FL
F	25	Chris Jr. Felix	6 ft 5 in (1.96 m)	185 lb (84 kg)	So	Houston, TX
G	30	Andre Nunley	5 ft 10 in (1.78 m)	180 lb (82 kg)	GS	Euless, TX
F	33	McKinley Harris	6 ft 5 in (1.96 m)	177 lb (80 kg)	Sr	Alief, TX

Head coach

- Byron Smith (Houston)

Assistant coach(es)

- Spencer Robertson (Wichita State)
- Johnnie Williams (Morehead State)
- Jacob Galindo (UTRGV)

Legend

- (C) Team captain
- (S) Suspended
- (I) Ineligible
- (W) Walk-on
- Injured
- Current redshirt

Roster
Last update: January 27, 2025

== Schedule and results ==
Date time, TV	Rank^{#}	Opponent^{#}	Result	Record	High points	High rebounds	High assists	Site (attendance) city, state
Non-conference regular season
November 6, 2023*; 12:00 p.m.		Kansas Christian	W 89–66	1–0	18 – Hopkins	10 – Myles	4 – Hopkins	William Nicks Building (350); Prairie View, TX
November 8, 2023*; 9:00 p.m., ESPN+		at Seattle	L 60–71	1–1	16 – Gazelas	7 – Hopkins	2 – Nunley	Redhawk Center (999); Seattle, WA
November 10, 2023*; 9:00 p.m., P12N		at Washington State; Pac-12/SWAC Legacy Series	L 65–83	1–2	22 – Smith IV	5 – Smith IV	5 – Nunley	Beasley Coliseum (2,282); Pullman, WA
November 14, 2023*; 7:00 p.m., ESPN+		at Abilene Christian	W 79–74	2–2	25 – Felix Jr.	9 – Myles	3 – Gazelas	Moody Coliseum (1,895); Abilene, TX
November 19, 2023*; 12:00 p.m., ESPN+		vs. UT Martin; Eastern Kentucky MTE	W 78–66	3–2	18 – tied	14 – Myles	4 – tied	Baptist Health Arena (150); Richmond, KY
November 21, 2023*; 11:00 a.m., ESPN+		at Eastern Kentucky; Eastern Kentucky MTE	W 76–64	4–2	20 – Lane Jr.	7 – Nunley	5 – Horton Jr.	Baptist Health Arena (5,631); Richmond, KY
November 29, 2023*; 6:00 p.m., ESPN+		at Tulane	L 77–98	4–3	23 – Smith IV	9 – Myles	3 – Smith IV	Devlin Fieldhouse (1,895); New Orleans, LA
December 10, 2023*; 12:00 p.m., ESPN+		at Iowa State	L 56–107	4–4	13 – Lane Jr.	5 – Myles	3 – tied	Hilton Coliseum (13,570); Ames, IA
December 12, 2023*; 7:00 p.m., ESPN+		at Northern Iowa	L 55–74	4–5	13 – Hopkins	8 – Hopkins	3 – Horton Jr.	McLeod Center (3,117); Cedar Falls, IA
December 18, 2023*; 3:00 p.m.		North American	W 92–61	5–5	21 – Myles	9 – Myles	5 – Horton Jr.	William Nicks Building (375); Prairie View, TX
December 20, 2023*; 7:00 p.m., ESPN+		at Rice	L 56–82	5–6	16 – Hopkins	6 – Myles	2 – tied	Tudor Fieldhouse (1,717); Houston, TX
December 28, 2023*; 7:00 p.m., ESPN+		at UTSA	L 89–103	5–7	19 – Felix Jr.	14 – Hopkins	7 – McGaskey	Convocation Center (1,082); San Antonio, TX
December 30, 2023*; 8:00 p.m., SECN		at Texas A&M	L 54–79	5–8	20 – Hopkins	8 – Myles	6 – McGaskey	Reed Arena (8,610); College Station, TX
SWAC regular season
January 6, 2024; 5:30 p.m.		at Grambling State	L 63–69	5–9 (0–1)	24 – Smith IV	4 – tied	6 – McGaskey	Fredrick C. Hobdy Assembly Center (1,273); Grambling, LA
January 8, 2024; 7:30 p.m.		at Southern	L 58–79	5–10 (0–2)	18 – tied	10 – Myles	2 – tied	F. G. Clark Center (2,689); Baton Rouge, LA
January 13, 2024; 6:00 p.m.		Mississippi Valley State	W 71–60	6–10 (1–2)	28 – Smith IV	12 – Myles	4 – McGaskey	William Nicks Building (360); Prairie View, TX
January 20, 2024; 5:30 p.m.		at Jackson State	W 71–62	7–10 (2–2)	18 – Smith IV	14 – Myles	3 – Myles	Williams Assembly Center (3,015); Jackson, MS
January 22, 2024; 8:00 p.m.		at Alcorn State	L 78–90	7–11 (2–3)	19 – tied	6 – Hopkins	5 – Horton Jr.	Davey Whitney Complex (1,808); Lorman, MS
January 27, 2024; 5:30 p.m.		Alabama State	L 67–74	7–12 (2–4)	18 – Myles	11 – Myles	3 – Hopkins	William Nicks Building (1,175); Prairie View, TX
January 29, 2024; 8:00 p.m.		Alabama A&M	W 87–76	8–12 (3–4)	31 – Hopkins	21 – Myles	3 – Myles	William Nicks Building (1,926); Prairie View, TX
February 3, 2024; 5:30 p.m.		Texas Southern	L 69–80	8–13 (3–5)	23 – Smith IV	7 – Myles	5 – McGaskey	William Nicks Building (3,514); Prairie View, TX
February 5, 2024; 7:30 p.m.		Arkansas–Pine Bluff; Rescheduled from January 15	W 75–74	9–13 (4–5)	23 – Smith IV	12 – Myles	8 – McGaskey	William Nicks Building (654); Prairie View, TX
February 10, 2024; 3:00 p.m.		at Bethune–Cookman	L 78–84	9–14 (4–6)	22 – Lane Jr.	10 – Myles	5 – Hopkins	Moore Gymnasium (710); Daytona Beach, FL
February 12, 2024; 8:00 p.m., ESPNU		at Florida A&M	W 61–58	10–14 (5–6)	18 – tied	18 – Myles	3 – tied	Al Lawson Center (402); Tallahassee, FL
February 17, 2024; 5:30 p.m.		Southern	L 71–77	10–15 (5–7)	22 – Smith IV	5 – Myles	4 – tied	William Nicks Building (1,266); Prairie View, TX
February 19, 2024; 7:30 p.m.		Grambling State	L 74–83	10–16 (5–8)	27 – tied	10 – Myles	5 – Smith IV	William Nicks Building; Prairie View, TX
February 24, 2024; 5:30 p.m.		at Arkansas–Pine Bluff	L 59–72	10–17 (5–9)	24 – Lane Jr.	10 – Myles	5 – McGaskey	H.O. Clemmons Arena (1,125); Pine Bluff, AR
February 26, 2024; 8:00 p.m.		at Mississippi Valley State	L 51–57	10–18 (5–10)	17 – tied	22 – Myles	2 – McGaskey	Harrison HPER Complex (1,301); Itta Bena, MS
March 2, 2024; 5:30 p.m.		Alcorn State	L 65–73	10–19 (5–11)	22 – Myles	13 – Myles	4 – Smith IV	William Nicks Building (1,032); Prairie View, TX
March 4, 2024; 7:30 p.m.		Jackson State	L 74–79	10–20 (5–12)	19 – Smith IV	9 – Myles	6 – McGaskey	William Nicks Building (929); Prairie View, TX
March 9, 2024; 5:30 p.m.		at Texas Southern	L 78–93	10–21 (5–13)	22 – Hopkins	5 – tied	4 – Hopkins	H&PE Arena (6,927); Houston, TX
*Non-conference game. ^{#}Rankings from AP poll. (#) Tournament seedings in parentheses. All times are in Central.
