= 2023–24 Arkansas–Pine Bluff Golden Lions men's basketball team =

American college basketball season

2023–24 Arkansas–Pine Bluff Golden Lions men's basketball
- Conference: Southwestern Athletic Conference
- Record: 13–18 (8–10 SWAC)
- Head coach: Solomon Bozeman (3rd season)
- Associate head coach: Bryan Sherrer
- Assistant coaches: Jeremiah Bozeman; Christian Robertson; Reginald Rogers
- Home arena: H.O. Clemmons Arena

2023–24 SWAC men's basketball standings
	Conf.				Overall
Team	W		L	PCT	W		L	PCT
Grambling State †	14	–	4	.778	21	–	15	.583
Alcorn State	13	–	5	.722	14	–	18	.438
Texas Southern	12	–	6	.667	16	–	17	.485
Southern	12	–	6	.667	18	–	14	.563
Bethune–Cookman	11	–	7	.611	17	–	17	.500
Jackson State	11	–	7	.611	15	–	17	.469
Alabama A&M	9	–	9	.500	12	–	23	.343
Alabama State	8	–	10	.444	13	–	19	.406
Arkansas–Pine Bluff	8	–	10	.444	13	–	18	.419
Prairie View A&M	5	–	13	.278	10	–	21	.323
Florida A&M	4	–	14	.222	6	–	23	.207
Mississippi Valley State	1	–	17	.056	1	–	30	.032
† 2024 SWAC tournament winner

The 2023–24 Arkansas–Pine Bluff Golden Lions men's basketball team represented the University of Arkansas at Pine Bluff during the 2023–24 NCAA Division I men's basketball season. The Golden Lions, led by third-year head coach Solomon Bozeman, played their home games at the H.O. Clemmons Arena in Pine Bluff, Arkansas as members of the Southwestern Athletic Conference (SWAC). They finished the season 13–18, 8–10 in SWAC play, to finish in a tie for eighth place, and thus they did not qualify to play in the SWAC tournament due to tiebreakers.

== Previous season ==
The Golden Lions finished the 2022–23 season 10–21, 6–12 in SWAC play, to finish in a tie for ninth place. They failed to qualify for the SWAC tournament, as only the top eight teams make it.

== Roster ==
2023–24 Arkansas–Pine Bluff Golden Lions men's basketball team
Players
Coaches

Pos.	#	Name	Height	Weight	Year	Previous school	Hometown
G	0	Trejon Ware	5 ft 9 in (1.75 m)	160 lb (73 kg)	Jr	Arkansas Baptist College	Pearland, TX
G	1	Kylen Milton	6 ft 4 in (1.93 m)	192 lb (87 kg)	Jr	Western Kentucky	Monticello, AR
G	2	Zach Reinhart	6 ft 6 in (1.98 m)	195 lb (88 kg)	So	PHS Academy	Orlando, FL
G	3	Kuron Coleman	6 ft 4 in (1.93 m)	180 lb (82 kg)	So	Central Pointe Christian	Newport News, VA
G	4	Orion Virden	6 ft 1 in (1.85 m)	195 lb (88 kg)	Sr	Collin College	Pine Bluff, AR
G	5	Rashad Williams	6 ft 2 in (1.88 m)	185 lb (84 kg)	GS	Saint Louis	Detroit, MI
G	11	Jyre McCloud	6 ft 5 in (1.96 m)	—	Jr	Indian River State College	Leesburg, FL
G	12	Deuce Wallace	6 ft 1 in (1.85 m)	—	Fr	Fulton Leadership Academy	Atlanta, GA
G	14	Kaine McColley	6 ft 5 in (1.96 m)	215 lb (98 kg)	GS	Bluefield State	Tampa, FL
F	22	Robert Lewis	6 ft 9 in (2.06 m)	210 lb (95 kg)	So	Cardinal Ritter Prep	St. Louis, MO
G	23	Lonnell Jr. Martin	6 ft 4 in (1.93 m)	215 lb (98 kg)	Sr	Montana	Flint, MI
G	30	Joe French	6 ft 5 in (1.96 m)	190 lb (86 kg)	GS	Bethune–Cookman	Orlando, FL
F	32	Caleb Stokes	6 ft 8 in (2.03 m)	275 lb (125 kg)	Sr	SAU Tech	Little Rock, AR
F	45	Ismael Plet	6 ft 8 in (2.03 m)	230 lb (104 kg)	Jr	Oral Roberts	Amsterdam, Netherlands

Head coach

- Solomon Bozeman (Little Rock)

Assistant coach(es)

- Bryan Sherrer (South Alabama)
- Jeremiah Bozeman (Auburn Montgomery)
- Christian Robertson (Arkansas–Pine Bluff)
- Reginald Rogers (Pitt–Bradford)

Legend

- (C) Team captain
- (S) Suspended
- (I) Ineligible
- (W) Walk-on
- Injured
- Current redshirt

Roster
Last update: December 6, 2023

== Schedule and results ==
Date time, TV	Rank^{#}	Opponent^{#}	Result	Record	High points	High rebounds	High assists	Site (attendance) city, state
Non-conference regular season
November 6, 2023*; 7:00 p.m., SECN+/ESPN+		at Missouri	L 79–101	0–1	34 – Milton	6 – French	4 – Ware	Mizzou Arena (11,486); Columbia, MO
November 9, 2023*; 7:00 p.m.		Champion Christian	W 116–73	1–1	26 – French	9 – 2 tied	6 – French	H.O. Clemmons Arena (1,343); Pine Bluff, AR
November 11, 2023*; 7:00 p.m.		Southwestern Christian	W 112–68	2–1	26 – Milton	7 – Plet	4 – 2 tied	H.O. Clemmons Arena (1,295); Pine Bluff, AR
November 13, 2023*; 6:30 p.m., ESPN+		at Central Arkansas	W 85–83	3–1	28 – Williams	7 – McCloud	3 – 3 tied	Farris Center (2,895); Conway, AR
November 18, 2023*; 7:30 p.m.		Incarnate Word	L 81–100	3–2	17 – Milton	6 – 2 tied	6 – Milton	H.O. Clemmons Arena (1,152); Pine Bluff, AR
November 21, 2023*; 8:00 p.m., B1G		at Minnesota	L 67–86	3–3	26 – Williams	8 – Lewis	5 – Williams	Williams Arena (6,591); Minneapolis, MN
November 24, 2023*; 1:00 p.m., ESPN+		at Ball State	L 74–92	3–4	29 – French	7 – Plet	5 – Williams	Worthen Arena (4,071); Muncie, IN
November 27, 2023*; 7:00 p.m.		Arkansas Baptist	W 85–60	4–4	25 – Milton	14 – Plet	10 – Williams	H.O. Clemmons Arena (1,843); Pine Bluff, AR
November 30, 2023*; 7:00 p.m., ESPN+		at No. 25 Oklahoma	L 86–107	4–5	24 – Milton	10 – Plet	3 – Martin Jr.	McCasland Field House (3,594); Norman, OK
December 5, 2023*; 8:00 p.m., ESPN+		at No. 7 Gonzaga	L 71–111	4–6	26 – French	9 – Plet	4 – Williams	McCarthey Athletic Center (6,000); Spokane, WA
December 9, 2023*; 11:00 a.m., FS2		at No. 5 UConn	L 63–101	4–7	23 – Williams	4 – Plet	3 – Milton	Harry A. Gampel Pavilion (10,299); Storrs, CT
December 12, 2023*; 6:00 p.m., ESPN+		at South Florida	L 86–104	4–8	21 – Williams	6 – McCloud	9 – Williams	Yuengling Center (2,643); Tampa, FL
December 18, 2023*; 7:00 p.m.		Ecclesia	W 125–75	5–8	34 – French	12 – Plet	11 – Ware	H.O. Clemmons Arena (526); Pine Bluff, AR
SWAC regular season
January 6, 2024; 5:30 p.m.		Alabama A&M	L 62–63	5–9 (0–1)	20 – Martin	7 – Plet	4 – Milton	H.O. Clemmons Arena (1,302); Pine Bluff, AR
January 8, 2024; 7:30 p.m.		Alabama State	L 72–83	5–10 (0–2)	16 – Milton	11 – Milton	4 – Plet	H.O. Clemmons Arena (1,385); Pine Bluff, AR
January 13, 2024; 5:00 p.m.		at Texas Southern	W 70–67	6–10 (1–2)	20 – Milton	9 – Plet	4 – 2 tied	H&PE Arena (1,208); Houston, TX
January 20, 2024; 5:30 p.m.		Florida A&M	W 99–97	7–10 (2–2)	27 – Williams	7 – Milton	6 – Martin Jr.	H.O. Clemmons Arena (2,944); Pine Bluff, AR
January 22, 2024; 7:30 p.m.		Bethune–Cookman	W 76–72	8–10 (3–2)	22 – Williams	8 – Milton	6 – Milton	H.O. Clemmons Arena; Pine Bluff, AR
January 27, 2024; 5:30 p.m.		at Southern	L 66–80	8–11 (3–3)	20 – Milton	14 – Plet	2 – 2 tied	F. G. Clark Center (6,017); Baton Rouge, LA
January 29, 2024; 7:30 p.m.		at Grambling State	W 86–70	9–11 (4–3)	26 – Milton	9 – Milton	4 – 2 tied	Fredrick C. Hobdy Assembly Center (1,482); Grambling, LA
February 3, 2024; 5:30 p.m.		at Mississippi Valley State	W 83–77	10–11 (5–3)	19 – Milton	11 – Milton	3 – Ware	Harrison HPER Complex (1,913); Itta Bena, MS
February 5, 2024; 8:15 p.m.		at Prairie View A&M; Rescheduled from January 15	L 74–75	10–12 (5–4)	28 – Williams	10 – Plet	3 – Ware	William J. Nicks Building (654); Prairie View, TX
February 10, 2024; 5:30 p.m.		Alcorn State	L 56–68	10–13 (5–5)	19 – Milton	14 – Milton	6 – Milton	H.O. Clemmons Arena (1,738); Pine Bluff, AR
February 12, 2024; 7:30 p.m.		Jackson State	L 63–76	10–14 (5–6)	16 – Lewis	10 – Lewis	3 – 3 tied	H.O. Clemmons Arena (2,638); Pine Bluff, AR
February 17, 2024; 5:30 p.m.		at Alabama State	W 80–74	11–14 (6–6)	33 – Williams	11 – Milton	3 – 2 tied	Dunn–Oliver Acadome (3,512); Montgomery, AL
February 19, 2024; 7:30 p.m.		at Alabama A&M	L 67–75	11–15 (6–7)	23 – Williams	13 – Plet	5 – Ware	Alabama A&M Events Center (1,733); Huntsville, AL
February 24, 2024; 5:30 p.m.		Prairie View A&M	W 72–59	12–15 (7–7)	15 – Plet	11 – 2 tied	8 – Ware	H.O. Clemmons Arena (1,125); Pine Bluff, AR
February 26, 2024; 7:30 p.m.		Texas Southern	L 70–77	12–16 (7–8)	20 – 2 tied	9 – Plet	5 – Ware	H.O. Clemmons Arena (2,182); Pine Bluff, AR
March 2, 2024; 5:30 p.m.		Mississippi Valley State	W 78–69	13–16 (8–8)	21 – 2 tied	10 – Plet	7 – Ware	H.O. Clemmons Arena (2,674); Pine Bluff, AR
March 7, 2024; 7:30 p.m.		at Jackson State	L 84–89	13–17 (8–9)	28 – French	8 – Plet	6 – Ware	Williams Assembly Center (1,866); Jackson, MS
March 9, 2024; 5:30 p.m.		at Alcorn State	L 95–104	13–18 (8–10)	20 – Williams	7 – Milton	5 – Ware	Davey Whitney Complex (635); Lorman, MS
*Non-conference game. ^{#}Rankings from AP poll. (#) Tournament seedings in parentheses. All times are in Central.
