= 2023–24 Bethune–Cookman Wildcats men's basketball team =

Basketball team season

2023–24 Bethune–Cookman Wildcats men's basketball

CBI, first round
- Conference: Southwestern Athletic Conference
- Record: 17–17 (11–7 SWAC)
- Head coach: Reggie Theus (3rd season)
- Associate head coach: Chris Pompey
- Assistant coaches: Billy Garrett; Richard Grant
- Home arena: Moore Gymnasium

2023–24 SWAC men's basketball standings
	Conf.				Overall
Team	W		L	PCT	W		L	PCT
Grambling State †	14	–	4	.778	21	–	15	.583
Alcorn State	13	–	5	.722	14	–	18	.438
Texas Southern	12	–	6	.667	16	–	17	.485
Southern	12	–	6	.667	18	–	14	.563
Bethune–Cookman	11	–	7	.611	17	–	17	.500
Jackson State	11	–	7	.611	15	–	17	.469
Alabama A&M	9	–	9	.500	12	–	23	.343
Alabama State	8	–	10	.444	13	–	19	.406
Arkansas–Pine Bluff	8	–	10	.444	13	–	18	.419
Prairie View A&M	5	–	13	.278	10	–	21	.323
Florida A&M	4	–	14	.222	6	–	23	.207
Mississippi Valley State	1	–	17	.056	1	–	30	.032
† 2024 SWAC tournament winner

The 2023–24 Bethune–Cookman Wildcats men's basketball team represented Bethune–Cookman University during the 2023–24 NCAA Division I men's basketball season. The Wildcats, led by third-year head coach Reggie Theus, played their home games at Moore Gymnasium in Daytona Beach, Florida as members of the Southwestern Athletic Conference (SWAC). They finished the season 17–17, 11–7 in SWAC play, to finish in a tie for fifth place. As the No. 5 seed in the WAC tournament, they defeated Southern in the quarterfinals, before losing to Grambling State in the semifinals. They received an invitation to the CBI, where they lost to Arkansas State in the first round.

== Previous season ==
The Wildcats finished the 2022–23 season 12–20, 8–10 in SWAC play, to finish in seventh place. In the quarterfinals of the SWAC tournament, they lost to Grambling State.

== Roster ==
2023–24 Bethune–Cookman Wildcats men's basketball team
Players
Coaches

Pos.	#	Name	Height	Weight	Year	Hometown
G/F	0	Jakobi Heady	6 ft 6 in (1.98 m)	200 lb (91 kg)	So	Chicago, IL
G	1	Zion Harmon	6 ft 0 in (1.83 m)	165 lb (75 kg)	So	Temple Hills, MD
G	2	Jayson Mathews	5 ft 10 in (1.78 m)	150 lb (68 kg)	RS Fr	Sacramento, CA
G	3	Seneca Willoughby	6 ft 4 in (1.93 m)	185 lb (84 kg)	So	Philadelphia, PA
F	4	Kiante Williams	6 ft 10 in (2.08 m)	185 lb (84 kg)	So	Lubbock, TX
G	5	Damani McEntire	6 ft 4 in (1.93 m)	205 lb (93 kg)	Sr	Indianapolis, IN
G	11	Dhashon Dyson	6 ft 1 in (1.85 m)	190 lb (86 kg)	Sr	Chicago, IL
G/F	12	Mason Dorsey	6 ft 5 in (1.96 m)	195 lb (88 kg)	Fr	Los Angeles, CA
F	15	Reggie Jr. Ward	6 ft 6 in (1.98 m)	230 lb (104 kg)	Jr	Chicago, IL
F	21	Dondre Watson	6 ft 8 in (2.03 m)	215 lb (98 kg)	Jr	The Bronx, NY
C	22	Youssouf Timera	6 ft 9 in (2.06 m)	230 lb (104 kg)	So	Paris, France
F/C	23	Derrick Jr. Carter-Hollinger	6 ft 6 in (1.98 m)	200 lb (91 kg)	Sr	San Diego, CA
G	30	Simeon Womack	6 ft 2 in (1.88 m)	170 lb (77 kg)	So	Jacksonville, FL
C	32	Elijah Hulsewe	7 ft 0 in (2.13 m)	260 lb (118 kg)	So	Orlando, FL
C	33	James Jr. Henderson	6 ft 9 in (2.06 m)	230 lb (104 kg)	So	Miami, FL

Head coach

- Reggie Theus (UNLV)

Assistant coach(es)

- Chris Pompey (Pittsburgh)
- Billy Garrett (DePaul)
- Richard Grant (Bridgeport)

Legend

- (C) Team captain
- (S) Suspended
- (I) Ineligible
- (W) Walk-on
- Injured
- Current redshirt

Roster
Last update: November 11, 2023

== Schedule and results ==
Date time, TV	Rank^{#}	Opponent^{#}	Result	Record	High points	High rebounds	High assists	Site (attendance) city, state
Non-conference regular season
November 6, 2023*; 8:00 p.m., B1G+		at Minnesota	L 60–80	0–1	17 – Heady	9 – Heady	3 – 2 tied	Williams Arena (7,132); Minneapolis, MN
November 10, 2023*; 7:00 p.m., CatEye Network		Trinity	W 113–46	1–1	20 – Harmon	11 – Hulsewe	6 – McEntire	Moore Gymnasium (678); Daytona Beach, FL
November 15, 2023*; 7:30 p.m., CatEye Network		Trinity Baptist	W 104–63	2–1	25 – Heady	10 – Watson	4 – Harmon	Moore Gymnasium (777); Daytona Beach, FL
November 20, 2023*; 7:00 p.m., CatEye Network		Charleston Southern	W 79–73	3–1	29 – Harmon	10 – Ward Jr.	6 – Harmon	Moore Gymnasium (671); Daytona Beach, FL
November 24, 2023*; 5:00 p.m., ESPN+		vs. Lamar; Brock Challenge	L 65–83	3–2	16 – 2 tied	8 – Henderson Jr.	2 – 2 tied	Joan Perry Brock Center (205); Farmville, VA
November 25, 2023*; 5:30 p.m., ESPN+		vs. Delaware State; Brock Challenge	L 64–72	3–3	19 – 2 tied	8 – Ward Jr.	6 – Harmon	Joan Perry Brock Center (243); Farmville, VA
November 26, 2023*; 3:30 p.m., ESPN+		at Longwood; Brock Challenge	L 48–69	3–4	13 – Hulsewe	7 – Hulsewe	2 – 2 tied	Joan Perry Brock Center (1,375); Farmville, VA
December 1, 2023*; 7:00 p.m., CatEye Network		Incarnate Word	W 96–82	4–4	33 – Harmon	12 – Carter-Hollinger Jr.	8 – Harmon	Moore Gymnasium (704); Daytona Beach, FL
December 9, 2023*; 2:00 p.m.		at South Carolina State	W 80–71	5–4	20 – Heady	8 – Heady	4 – 2 tied	SHM Memorial Center (515); Orangeburg, SC
December 16, 2023*; 7:00 p.m., ESPN+		at Purdue Fort Wayne	L 63–86	5–5	22 – Dyson	13 – Hulsewe	4 – Harmon	Hilliard Gates Sports Center (1,089); Fort Wayne, IN
December 20, 2023*; 8:00 p.m.		at Chicago State	L 54–55	5–6	17 – Heady	6 – 2 tied	4 – Harmon	Jones Convocation Center (693); Chicago, IL
December 29, 2023*; 7:00 p.m., ESPN+		at UCF	L 54–98	5–7	15 – Dyson	9 – Heady	2 – 2 tied	Addition Financial Arena (5,188); Orlando, FL
December 31, 2023*; 3:00 p.m., ESPN+/SECN+		at Mississippi State	L 62–85	5–8	16 – Heady	6 – Heady	3 – Heady	Humphrey Coliseum (7,035); Starkville, MS
SWAC regular season
January 6, 2024; 4:00 p.m., CatEye Network		Florida A&M	W 98–86	6–8 (1–0)	30 – Dyson	6 – Carter-Hollinger Jr.	10 – Harmon	Moore Gymnasium (992); Daytona Beach, FL
January 13, 2024; 4:00 p.m., CatEye Network		Grambling State	L 69–79	6–9 (1–1)	21 – Dyson	8 – Hulsewe	7 – Dyson	Moore Gymnasium (882); Daytona Beach, FL
January 15, 2024; 7:30 p.m., CatEye Network		Southern	W 83–81 ^{OT}	7–9 (2–1)	19 – 2 tied	8 – Ward Jr.	5 – Dyson	Moore Gymnasium (812); Daytona Beach, FL
January 20, 2024; 7:00 p.m.		at Mississippi Valley State	W 80–64	8–9 (3–1)	18 – Carter-Hollinger Jr.	6 – Henderson Jr.	2 – Willoughby	Harrison HPER Complex (2,203); Itta Bena, MS
January 22, 2024; 8:30 p.m.		at Arkansas–Pine Bluff	L 72–76	8–10 (3–2)	25 – Heady	8 – 2 tied	4 – 2 tied	H.O. Clemmons Arena; Pine Bluff, AR
January 27, 2024; 4:00 p.m., CatEye Network		Jackson State	W 82–71	9–10 (4–2)	23 – Harmon	12 – Ward Jr.	6 – Harmon	Moore Gymnasium (915); Daytona Beach, FL
January 29, 2024; 7:30 p.m., ESPNU		Alcorn State	L 67–70	9–11 (4–3)	23 – Harmon	5 – Dyson	6 – 2 tied	Moore Gymnasium (998); Daytona Beach, FL
February 3, 2024; 5:00 p.m.		at Alabama State	W 79–68	10–11 (5–3)	19 – Dyson	12 – Ward Jr.	2 – 4 tied	Dunn–Oliver Acadome (3,200); Montgomery, AL
February 5, 2024; 8:00 p.m.		at Alabama A&M	L 68–72	10–12 (5–4)	16 – Heady	6 – 2 tied	4 – Harmon	Alabama A&M Events Center (2,019); Huntsville, AL
February 10, 2024; 4:00 p.m., CatEye Network		Prairie View A&M	W 84–78	11–12 (6–4)	21 – Heady	6 – McEntire	5 – Harmon	Moore Gymnasium (710); Daytona Beach, FL
February 12, 2024; 7:30 p.m., CatEye Network		Texas Southern	W 83–79	12–12 (7–4)	20 – Harmon	5 – 2 tied	4 – Harmon	Moore Gymnasium (889); Daytona Beach, FL
February 17, 2024; 4:00 p.m.		at Alcorn State	L 54–69	12–13 (7–5)	27 – Ward Jr.	7 – Heady	2 – 2 tied	Davey Whitney Complex (1,030); Lorman, MS
February 19, 2024; 8:30 p.m.		at Jackson State	L 60–61	12–14 (8–5)	17 – Heady	5 – Willoughby	3 – Henderson Jr.	Williams Assembly Center (967); Jackson, MS
February 24, 2024; 4:00 p.m., CatEye Network		Alabama A&M	W 63–61	13–14 (8–6)	15 – Harmon	6 – Hulsewe	4 – Harmon	Moore Gymnasium (771); Daytona Beach, FL
February 26, 2024; 7:30 p.m., CatEye Network		Alabama State	W 90–84 ^{OT}	14–14 (9–6)	24 – Heady	10 – 2 tied	6 – Harmon	Moore Gymnasium (917); Daytona Beach, FL
March 2, 2024; 6:30 p.m.		at Southern	W 67–61	15–14 (10–6)	23 – 2 tied	8 – 2 tied	3 – Harmon	F. G. Clark Center (4,289); Baton Rouge, LA
March 4, 2024; 8:30 p.m.		at Grambling State	L 60–69	15–15 (10–7)	15 – Dyson	7 – Ward Jr.	3 – Heady	Fredrick C. Hobdy Assembly Center (1,401); Grambling, LA
March 9, 2024; 4:00 p.m.		at Florida A&M	W 67–66 ^{OT}	16–15 (11–7)	26 – Dyson	7 – Ward Jr.	2 – Dyson	Al Lawson Center (1,121); Tallahassee, FL
SWAC tournament
March 14, 2024; 8:30 p.m., ESPN+	(5)	vs. (4) Southern; Quarterfinals	W 73–58	17–15	20 – Dyson	5 – tied	2 – tied	Bartow Arena (624); Birmingham, AL
March 15, 2024; 2:00 p.m., ESPN+	(5)	vs. (1) Grambling State; Semifinals	L 53–65	17–16	17 – Heady	9 – Heady	2 – tied	Bartow Arena (528); Birmingham, AL
CBI
March 23, 2024; 1:00 p.m., FloHoops	(13)	vs. (4) Arkansas State; First round	L 85–86	17–17	19 – Heady	5 – Heady	4 – Harmon	Ocean Center; Daytona Beach, FL
*Non-conference game. ^{#}Rankings from AP poll. (#) Tournament seedings in parentheses. All times are in Eastern.
