= 2023–24 Southern Jaguars basketball team =

American college basketball season

2023–24 Southern Jaguars basketball
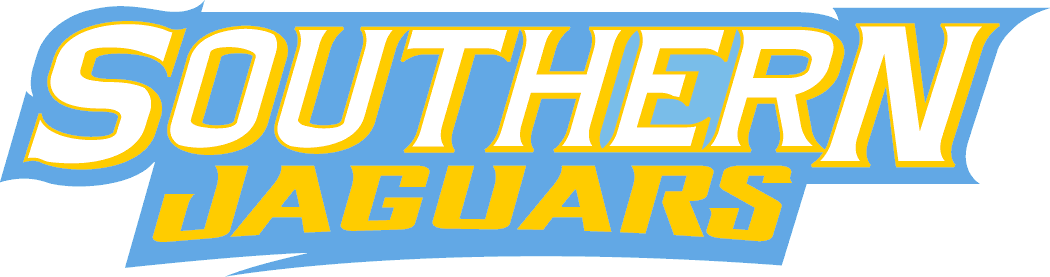
- Conference: Southwestern Athletic Conference
- Record: 18–14 (12–6 SWAC)
- Head coach: Kevin Johnson (1st season)
- Assistant coaches: Rennie Bailey; Rashaad Richardson; Jethro Hillman; Jon Tavel
- Home arena: F. G. Clark Center

2023–24 SWAC men's basketball standings
	Conf.				Overall
Team	W		L	PCT	W		L	PCT
Grambling State †	14	–	4	.778	21	–	15	.583
Alcorn State	13	–	5	.722	14	–	18	.438
Texas Southern	12	–	6	.667	16	–	17	.485
Southern	12	–	6	.667	18	–	14	.563
Bethune–Cookman	11	–	7	.611	17	–	17	.500
Jackson State	11	–	7	.611	15	–	17	.469
Alabama A&M	9	–	9	.500	12	–	23	.343
Alabama State	8	–	10	.444	13	–	19	.406
Arkansas–Pine Bluff	8	–	10	.444	13	–	18	.419
Prairie View A&M	5	–	13	.278	10	–	21	.323
Florida A&M	4	–	14	.222	6	–	23	.207
Mississippi Valley State	1	–	17	.056	1	–	30	.032
† 2024 SWAC tournament winner

The 2023–24 Southern Jaguars basketball team represented Southern University during the 2023–24 NCAA Division I men's basketball season. The Jaguars, led by first-year head coach Kevin Johnson, played their home games at the F. G. Clark Center in Baton Rouge, Louisiana as members of the Southwestern Athletic Conference (SWAC). They finished the season 18–14, 12–6 in SWAC play, to finish in a tie for third place. As the No. 4 seed in the SWAC tournament, they lost to Bethune–Cookman in the quarterfinals.

== Previous season ==
The Jaguars finished the 2022–23 season 15–17, 11–7 in SWAC play, to finish in fourth place. As the #4 seed in the SWAC tournament, they were defeated by #5 seed Alabama A&M.

On March 23, 2023, it was announced that head coach Sean Woods was fired after five years at the helm. Less than a week later, on March 29, Tulane assistant coach Kevin Johnson was announced as Woods' successor.

== Roster ==
2023–24 Southern Jaguars men's basketball team
Players
Coaches

Pos.	#	Name	Height	Weight	Year	Previous school	Hometown
F/C	0	Brentay Noel	6 ft 10 in (2.08 m)	220 lb (100 kg)	So	Baton Rouge Prep	Baton Rouge, LA
F	1	JaRonn Wilkens	6 ft 8 in (2.03 m)	190 lb (86 kg)	Sr	Pearl River CC	Biloxi, MS
G	2	Antoine Jacks	5 ft 9 in (1.75 m)	170 lb (77 kg)	Jr	Indian River State	Greenbelt, MD
G	3	Tai'Reon Joseph	6 ft 3 in (1.91 m)	175 lb (79 kg)	Jr	East Central CC	Baton Rouge, LA
G	4	Derrick Tezeno	6 ft 5 in (1.96 m)	205 lb (93 kg)	Jr	Stephen F. Austin	Melville, LA
F	5	Jariyon Wilkens	6 ft 7 in (2.01 m)	185 lb (84 kg)	Sr	Pearl River CC	Biloxi, MS
G	9/24	Jordan Mitchell	6 ft 3 in (1.91 m)	175 lb (79 kg)	Jr	Florida SouthWestern State	West Memphis, AR
G	10	Brandon Davis	6 ft 1 in (1.85 m)	185 lb (84 kg)	RS Sr	Texas State	LaPlace, LA
G	11	Jordan Johnson	6 ft 4 in (1.93 m)	195 lb (88 kg)	Fr	Northeastern Oklahoma A&M	West Palm Beach, FL
F	12	Jalen Reynolds	6 ft 7 in (2.01 m)	245 lb (111 kg)	Sr	South Georgia Tech	Darien, GA
G	13	Dre'Shawn Allen	6 ft 1 in (1.85 m)	170 lb (77 kg)	GS	Western Illinois	Auburn Hills, MI
G	14	Chase Sample	5 ft 10 in (1.78 m)	165 lb (75 kg)	Fr	Scotlandville HS	Baton Rouge, LA
G	22	Tidjiane Dioumassi	6 ft 4 in (1.93 m)	200 lb (91 kg)	Jr	Lee College	Paris, France
F	23	Avontez Ledet	6 ft 5 in (1.96 m)	205 lb (93 kg)	Jr	Lamar State–Port Arthur	Baton Rouge, LA
F	35	Delang Muon	6 ft 8 in (2.03 m)	202 lb (92 kg)	Fr	Grace Baptist Academy	Frankston, Australia

Head coach

- Kevin Johnson (UTPA)

Assistant coach(es)

- Rennie Bailey (Louisiana Tech)
- Rashaad Richardson (Georgia State)
- Jethro Hillman (Miami (FL))
- Jon Tavel (Tulane)

Legend

- (C) Team captain
- (S) Suspended
- (I) Ineligible
- (W) Walk-on
- Injured
- Current redshirt

Roster
Last update: December 6, 2023

== Schedule and results ==
Date time, TV	Rank^{#}	Opponent^{#}	Result	Record	High points	High rebounds	High assists	Site (attendance) city, state
Exhibition
October 31, 2023*; 6:30 p.m.		Louisiana Christian	W 94–60	–	23 – Joseph	8 – Joseph	6 – Joseph	F. G. Clark Center (1,825); Baton Rouge, LA
Non-conference regular season
November 6, 2023*; 8:00 p.m., ESPN+		at TCU	L 75–108	0–1	20 – Davis	5 – Noel	5 – Dioumassi	Schollmaier Arena (5,729); Fort Worth, TX
November 8, 2023*; 9:00 p.m.		at UNLV	W 85–71	1–1	22 – Joseph	6 – Davis	8 – Dioumassi	Thomas & Mack Center (5,573); Paradise, NV
November 13, 2023*; 7:00 p.m., P12N		at No. 3 Arizona; Pac-12/SWAC Legacy Series	L 59–97	1–2	22 – Joseph	5 – Noel	5 – Joseph	McKale Center (12,868); Tucson, AZ
November 17, 2023*; 7:00 p.m., ESPN+		at Western Illinois	L 80–88 ^{OT}	1–3	23 – Joseph	9 – JaRo. Wilkens	7 – Dioumassi	Western Hall (667); Macomb, IL
November 19, 2023*; 7:00 p.m., B1G		at No. 23 Illinois	L 60–88	1–4	16 – Joseph	4 – Muon	5 – Mitchell	State Farm Center (12,012); Champaign, IL
November 25, 2023*; 3:00 p.m., ESPN+		at Valparaiso	L 59–71	1–5	15 – Joseph	6 – 2 tied	3 – Mitchell	Athletics–Recreation Center (1,098); Valparaiso, IN
November 28, 2023*; 8:00 p.m., FS1		at No. 3 Marquette	L 56–93	1–6	21 – Johnson	6 – Dioumassi	7 – Davis	Fiserv Forum (13,607); Milwaukee, WI
December 3, 2023*; 3:00 p.m., SECN		at No. 21 Mississippi State	W 60–59	2–6	27 – Joseph	6 – 2 tied	4 – Dioumassi	Humphrey Coliseum (7,186); Starkville, MS
December 9, 2023*; 5:30 p.m., JSN		Southeastern Louisiana	W 69–44	3–6	14 – Davis	7 – Muon	7 – Davis	F. G. Clark Center (2,190); Baton Rouge, LA
December 12, 2023*; 11:00 a.m., JSN		Champion Christian	W 109–60	4–6	25 – Joseph	12 – Tezeno	5 – Mitchell	F. G. Clark Center (1,679); Baton Rouge, LA
December 16, 2023*; 1:00 p.m., ESPN+		at Tulane	L 81–105	4–7	23 – Joseph	5 – Tezeno	5 – Mitchell	Devlin Fieldhouse (1,407); New Orleans, LA
December 19, 2023*; 2:00 p.m., JSN		Wiley	W 82–49	5–7	15 – Davis	10 – JaRo. Wilkens	7 – Dioumassi	F. G. Clark Center (1,589); Baton Rouge, LA
December 31, 2023*; 2:00 p.m., JSN		Ecclesia	W 115–42	6–7	18 – Joseph	11 – Tezeno	10 – Dioumassi	F. G. Clark Center (1,759); Baton Rouge, LA
SWAC regular season
January 6, 2024; 5:30 p.m.		Texas Southern	W 58–51	7–7 (1–0)	15 – Dioumassi	6 – 3 tied	4 – Dioumassi	F. G. Clark Center (3,259); Baton Rouge, LA
January 8, 2024; 8:00 p.m.		Prairie View A&M	W 79–58	8–7 (2–0)	21 – Joseph	8 – Dioumassi	6 – 2 tied	F. G. Clark Center (2,689); Baton Rouge, LA
January 13, 2024; 3:00 p.m.		at Florida A&M	W 74–65	9–7 (3–0)	33 – Joseph	5 – 2 tied	6 – Dioumassi	Al Lawson Center (1,289); Tallahassee, FL
January 15, 2024; 7:30 p.m.		at Bethune–Cookman	L 81–83 ^{OT}	9–8 (3–1)	31 – Joseph	6 – JaRo. Wilkens	8 – Tezeno	Moore Gymnasium (812); Daytona Beach, FL
January 20, 2024; 2:30 p.m.		at Grambling State	L 62–79	9–9 (3–2)	23 – Joseph	8 – Dioumassi	3 – Dioumassi	Fredrick C. Hobdy Assembly Center (2,807); Grambling, LA
January 27, 2024; 5:30 p.m.		Arkansas–Pine Bluff	W 80–66	10–9 (4–2)	17 – Tezeno	6 – Reynolds	5 – Dioumassi	F. G. Clark Center (6,017); Baton Rouge, LA
January 29, 2024; 8:00 p.m.		Mississippi Valley State	W 78–54	11–9 (5–2)	18 – Joseph	7 – Dioumassi	7 – Dioumassi	F. G. Clark Center (3,729); Baton Rouge, LA
February 3, 2024; 5:30 p.m.		at Alcorn State	W 71–70	12–9 (6–2)	16 – Davis	7 – Tezeno	7 – Dioumassi	Davey Whitney Complex (1,702); Lorman, MS
February 5, 2024; 8:00 p.m., ESPNU		at Jackson State	W 72–63	13–9 (7–2)	16 – Davis	11 – Tezeno	4 – Davis	Williams Assembly Center (2,789); Jackson, MS
February 10, 2024; 5:30 p.m.		Alabama A&M	W 69–62	14–9 (8–2)	20 – Davis	11 – Muon	6 – Dioumassi	F. G. Clark Center (3,983); Baton Rouge, LA
February 12, 2024; 8:00 p.m.		Alabama State	W 73–62	15–9 (9–2)	19 – Tezeno	6 – 2 tied	12 – Dioumassi	F. G. Clark Center (3,967); Baton Rouge, LA
February 17, 2024; 5:30 p.m.		at Prairie View A&M	W 77–71	16–9 (10–2)	20 – Davis	10 – Tezeno	5 – Jacks	William J. Nicks Building (1,266); Prairie View, TX
February 19, 2024; 8:00 p.m.		at Texas Southern	L 56–68	16–10 (10–3)	14 – Davis	4 – Tezeno	8 – Dioumassi	H&PE Arena (3,009); Houston, TX
February 24, 2024; 5:30 p.m.		Grambling State	L 57–63	16–11 (10–4)	12 – Davis	5 – Dioumassi	6 – 2 tied	F. G. Clark Center (7,198); Baton Rouge, LA
March 2, 2024; 2:30 p.m.		Bethune–Cookman	L 61–67	16–12 (10–5)	12 – Tezeno	7 – 2 tied	11 – Dioumassi	F. G. Clark Center (4,289); Baton Rouge, LA
March 4, 2024; 8:00 p.m.		Florida A&M	W 58–44	17–12 (11–5)	14 – Allen	10 – Tezeno	9 – Dioumassi	F. G. Clark Center (5,689); Baton Rouge, LA
March 7, 2024; 8:00 p.m.		at Alabama State	W 65–57	18–12 (12–5)	31 – Davis	13 – Noel	4 – Dioumassi	Dunn–Oliver Acadome (2,437); Montgomery, AL
March 9, 2024; 5:30 p.m.		at Alabama A&M	L 56–66	18–13 (12–6)	19 – Tezeno	7 – Noel	4 – Davis	Alabama A&M Events Center (1,855); Huntsville, AL
SWAC tournament
March 14, 2024; 8:30 p.m., ESPN+	(4)	vs. (5) Bethune–Cookman; Quarterfinals	L 58–73	18–14	17 – Dioumassi	6 – Noel	1 – 6 tied	Bartow Arena (624); Birmingham, AL
*Non-conference game. ^{#}Rankings from AP poll. (#) Tournament seedings in parentheses. All times are in Central.
