= 2023–24 Mississippi Valley State Delta Devils basketball team =

American college basketball season

2023–24 Mississippi Valley State Delta Devils basketball
- Conference: Southwestern Athletic Conference
- Record: 1–30 (1–17 SWAC)
- Head coach: George Ivory (2nd season)
- Assistant coaches: Kevin Sims; Cary Shelton
- Home arena: Harrison HPER Complex

2023–24 SWAC men's basketball standings
	Conf.				Overall
Team	W		L	PCT	W		L	PCT
Grambling State †	14	–	4	.778	21	–	15	.583
Alcorn State	13	–	5	.722	14	–	18	.438
Texas Southern	12	–	6	.667	16	–	17	.485
Southern	12	–	6	.667	18	–	14	.563
Bethune–Cookman	11	–	7	.611	17	–	17	.500
Jackson State	11	–	7	.611	15	–	17	.469
Alabama A&M	9	–	9	.500	12	–	23	.343
Alabama State	8	–	10	.444	13	–	19	.406
Arkansas–Pine Bluff	8	–	10	.444	13	–	18	.419
Prairie View A&M	5	–	13	.278	10	–	21	.323
Florida A&M	4	–	14	.222	6	–	23	.207
Mississippi Valley State	1	–	17	.056	1	–	30	.032
† 2024 SWAC tournament winner

The 2023–24 Mississippi Valley State Delta Devils basketball team represented Mississippi Valley State University during the 2023–24 NCAA Division I men's basketball season. The Delta Devils, led by second-year head coach George Ivory, played their home games at the Harrison HPER Complex in Itta Bena, Mississippi as members of the Southwestern Athletic Conference. They finished the season 1–30, 1–17 in SWAC play to finish in twelfth place, and thus they did not qualify to play in the SWAC Tournament.

== Previous season ==
The Delta Devils finished the 2022–23 season 5–27, 4–14 in SWAC play to finish in last place. They failed to qualify for the SWAC tournament, as only the top eight teams make it.

== Roster ==
2023–24 Mississippi Valley State Delta Devils men's basketball team
Players
Coaches

Pos.	#	Name	Height	Weight	Year	Previous school	Hometown
G	0	Rayquan Brown	6 ft 6 in (1.98 m)	190 lb (86 kg)	Sr	Coahoma CC	Atlanta, Georgia
G	1	Chidi Umeh	6 ft 8 in (2.03 m)	185 lb (84 kg)	Fr	Highlands HS	Highlands, Texas
G	3	Donovan Sanders	5 ft 11 in (1.8 m)	170 lb (77 kg)	Jr	Mississippi Gulf Coast CC	Walls, Mississippi
F	5	Walter Hamilton	6 ft 8 in (2.03 m)	220 lb (100 kg)	Sr	Itawamba CC	Potts Camp, Mississippi
G	10	Danny Washington	6 ft 0 in (1.83 m)	175 lb (79 kg)	Sr	East Mississippi CC	Greenville, Mississippi
G	11	Jaylon Sanders	6 ft 5 in (1.96 m)	180 lb (82 kg)	Jr	NW Mississippi CC	Southaven, Mississippi
F	12	Kameron Mayhan	6 ft 8 in (2.03 m)	210 lb (95 kg)	Jr	Long Beach City College	Gardena, California
G	13	Darrius Clark	6 ft 5 in (1.96 m)	200 lb (91 kg)	Sr	Holmes CC	Indianola, Mississippi
G	14	George Ivory III	6 ft 2 in (1.88 m)	170 lb (77 kg)	Jr	Arkansas–Pine Bluff	Jackson, Mississippi
F	15	Alvin Stredic	6 ft 8 in (2.03 m)	215 lb (98 kg)	Sr	Arkansas–Pine Bluff	Bay City, Texas
F	20	Quorien Waldon	6 ft 9 in (2.06 m)	220 lb (100 kg)	Jr	Woodland HS	Atlanta, Georgia
G	21	Markell Petro	6 ft 3 in (1.91 m)	180 lb (82 kg)	Sr	East Mississippi CC	Rosedale, Mississippi
F	22	Reginald Reynolds	6 ft 5 in (1.96 m)	220 lb (100 kg)	GS	Allen	Sparta, Georgia
G/F	23	Arecko Gipson	6 ft 7 in (2.01 m)	210 lb (95 kg)	Sr	SW Tennessee CC	Memphis, Tennessee
G/F	24	Ernest Minton	6 ft 6 in (1.98 m)	190 lb (86 kg)	Sr	NW Mississippi CC	Indianola, Mississippi
F	25	Daniel Umoh	6 ft 9 in (2.06 m)	245 lb (111 kg)	Jr	Solid Rock Academy	Lagos, Nigeria
G	33	Jordan Johnson	6 ft 4 in (1.93 m)	195 lb (88 kg)	GS	Craigmont HS	Memphis, Tennessee

Head coach

- George Ivory (Mississippi Valley State)

Assistant coach(es)

- Kevin Sims (Tulane)
- Cary Shelton (Arkansas State)

Legend

- (C) Team captain
- (S) Suspended
- (I) Ineligible
- (W) Walk-on
- Injured
- Current redshirt

Roster
Last update: December 7, 2023

== Schedule and results ==
Date time, TV	Rank^{#}	Opponent^{#}	Result	Record	High points	High rebounds	High assists	Site (attendance) city, state
Non-conference regular season
November 6, 2023*; 7:00 pm, SECN+/ESPN+		at LSU	L 60–106	0–1	17 – Brown	7 – Washington	3 – Washington	Pete Maravich Assembly Center (7,922); Baton Rouge, LA
November 10, 2023*; 7:00 pm, ESPN+		at Oklahoma	L 43–82	0–2	14 – Brown	7 – Brown	3 – D. Sanders	Lloyd Noble Center (5,447); Norman, OK
November 14, 2023*; 6:00 pm, FS2		at No. 5 UConn	L 53–87	0–3	18 – Brown	8 – Brown	3 – Washington	XL Center (13,298); Hartford, CT
November 17, 2023*; 7:00 pm, ESPN+		at TCU	L 52–86	0–4	17 – Brown	6 – Mayhan	3 – D. Sanders	Schollmaier Arena (5,574); Fort Worth, TX
November 20, 2023*; 9:00 pm, ESPN+		at Santa Clara	L 39–81	0–5	15 – D. Sanders	4 – 2 Tied	2 – Reynolds	Leavey Center (1,037); Santa Clara, CA
November 24, 2023*; 9:00 pm, ESPN+		at Cal State Northridge	L 48–84	0–6	20 – Brown	4 – D. Sanders	7 – D. Sanders	Premier America Credit Union Arena (390); Northridge, CA
November 26, 2023*; 4:00 pm, ESPN+		at Pacific	L 65–68 ^{OT}	0–7	23 – Brown	8 – Gipson	3 – Brown	Alex G. Spanos Center (684); Stockton, CA
December 2, 2023*; 1:00 pm, ESPN+		at North Texas	L 48–79	0–8	20 – Gipson	9 – Gipson	2 – Washington	The Super Pit (3,065); Denton, TX
December 5, 2023*; 6:00 pm, ESPN+		at Liberty	L 39–74	0–9	18 – D. Sanders	6 – D. Sanders	3 – Washington	Liberty Arena (2,942); Lynchburg, VA
December 11, 2023*; 8:00 pm, ESPN+		at No. 10 Gonzaga	L 40–78	0–10	19 – Brown	9 – Brown	3 – Sanders	McCarthey Athletic Center (6,000); Spokane, WA
December 19, 2023*; 7:00 pm, ESPN+		at Tulsa	L 50–79	0–11	19 – Gipson	8 – Gipson	4 – Sanders	Reynolds Center (2,773); Tulsa, OK
December 22, 2023*; 6:00 pm, ESPN+		at No. 10 Baylor	L 48–107	0–12	14 – Reynolds	6 – Brown	2 – Brown	Ferrell Center (8,794); Waco, TX
December 30, 2023*; 5:00 pm, ESPN+		at San Francisco	L 42–92	0–13	13 – Gipson	4 – Gipson	2 – D. Sanders	War Memorial Gymnasium (1,773); San Francisco, CA
SWAC regular season
January 6, 2024; 6:00 pm		Alabama State	L 51–54	0–14 (0–1)	11 – D. Sanders	11 – Brown	2 – 3 Tied	Harrison HPER Complex (2,315); Itta Bena, MS
January 8, 2024; 7:30 pm		Alabama A&M	L 70–78	0–15 (0–2)	23 – 2 Tied	5 – Brown	3 – D. Sanders	Harrison HPER Complex (1,992); Itta Bena, MS
January 13, 2024; 5:00 pm		at Prairie View A&M	L 60–71	0–16 (0–3)	17 – Brown	7 – 3 Tied	4 – D. Sanders	William J. Nicks Building (360); Prairie View, TX
January 15, 2024; 7:30 pm		at Texas Southern	L 61–93	0–17 (0–4)	24 – Brown	17 – Brown	4 – D. Sanders	H&PE Arena (790); Houston, TX
January 20, 2024; 6:00 pm		Bethune–Cookman	L 64–80	0–18 (0–5)	30 – Brown	9 – Brown	5 – Washington	Harrison HPER Complex (2,203); Itta Bena, MS
January 22, 2024; 7:30 pm		Florida A&M	L 70–81	0–19 (0–6)	21 – Gipson	9 – Brown	3 – Washington	Harrison HPER Complex (1,305); Itta Bena, MS
January 27, 2024; 5:00 pm		at Grambling State	L 46–54	0–20 (0–7)	18 – Brown	8 – Gipson	2 – Brown	Fredrick C. Hobdy Assembly Center (1,296); Grambling, LA
January 29, 2024; 7:30 pm		at Southern	L 54–78	0–21 (0–8)	17 – Gipson	6 – Gipson	3 – Brown	F. G. Clark Center (3,729); Baton Rouge, LA
February 3, 2024; 6:00 pm		Arkansas–Pine Bluff	L 77–83	0–22 (0–9)	22 – 2 Tied	10 – Gipson	7 – D. Sanders	Harrison HPER Complex (1,913); Itta Bena, MS
February 10, 2024; 6:00 pm		Jackson State	L 69–77	0–23 (0–10)	20 – Brown	6 – Brown	6 – D. Sanders	Harrison HPER Complex (2,412); Itta Bena, MS
February 12, 2024; 7:30 pm		Alcorn State	L 55–72	0–24 (0–11)	26 – Brown	5 – Gipson	5 – Washington	Harrison HPER Complex (2,300); Itta Bena, MS
February 17, 2024; 2:00 pm		at Alabama A&M	L 57–80	0–25 (0–12)	38 – Brown	5 – Brown	3 – Washington	Alabama A&M Events Center (1,817); Huntsville, AL
February 19, 2024; 7:30 pm		at Alabama State	L 46–61	0–26 (0–13)	16 – Brown	7 – Brown	3 – Sanders	Dunn–Oliver Acadome; Montgomery, AL
February 24, 2024; 6:00 pm		Texas Southern	L 52–73	0–27 (0–14)	17 – Washington	6 – Brown	4 – Reynolds	Harrison HPER Complex (1,587); Itta Bena, MS
February 26, 2024; 7:30 pm		Prairie View A&M	W 57–51	1–27 (1–14)	21 – Brown	8 – Washington	4 – D. Sanders	Harrison HPER Complex (1,301); Itta Bena, MS
March 2, 2024; 6:00 pm		at Arkansas–Pine Bluff	L 69–78	1–28 (1–15)	39 – Brown	8 – Brown	7 – Washington	H.O. Clemmons Arena (2,674); Pine Bluff, AR
March 7, 2024; 7:30 pm		at Alcorn State	L 67–74	1–29 (1–16)	17 – Washington	6 – Brown	5 – Washington	Davey Whitney Complex (753); Lorman, MS
March 9, 2024; 5:00 pm		at Jackson State	L 67–68	1–30 (1–17)	20 – Sanders	5 – Reynolds	6 – Sanders	Williams Assembly Center (3,963); Jackson, MS
*Non-conference game. ^{#}Rankings from AP Poll. (#) Tournament seedings in parentheses. All times are in Central.
