= 2023–24 Alabama A&M Bulldogs basketball team =

Basketball team season

2023–24 Alabama A&M Bulldogs basketball
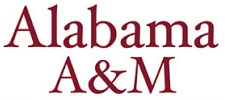

CIT, semifinals
- Conference: Southwestern Athletic Conference
- Record: 12–23 (9–9 SWAC)
- Head coach: Otis Hughley Jr. (2nd season)
- Associate head coach: Cal Cochran
- Assistant coaches: Rodney Broughton Jr.; Brandon Houston
- Home arena: Alabama A&M Events Center

2023–24 SWAC men's basketball standings
	Conf.				Overall
Team	W		L	PCT	W		L	PCT
Grambling State †	14	–	4	.778	21	–	15	.583
Alcorn State	13	–	5	.722	14	–	18	.438
Texas Southern	12	–	6	.667	16	–	17	.485
Southern	12	–	6	.667	18	–	14	.563
Bethune–Cookman	11	–	7	.611	17	–	17	.500
Jackson State	11	–	7	.611	15	–	17	.469
Alabama A&M	9	–	9	.500	12	–	23	.343
Alabama State	8	–	10	.444	13	–	19	.406
Arkansas–Pine Bluff	8	–	10	.444	13	–	18	.419
Prairie View A&M	5	–	13	.278	10	–	21	.323
Florida A&M	4	–	14	.222	6	–	23	.207
Mississippi Valley State	1	–	17	.056	1	–	30	.032
† 2024 SWAC tournament winner

The 2023–24 Alabama A&M Bulldogs basketball team represented Alabama A&M University during the 2023–24 NCAA Division I men's basketball season. The Bulldogs, led by second-year head coach Otis Hughley Jr., played their home games at the Alabama A&M Events Center in Huntsville, Alabama as members of the Southwestern Athletic Conference (SWAC). They finished the season 12–23, 9–9 in SWAC play, to finish in seventh place. As the No. 7 seed in the SWAC tournament, they defeated Alcorn State in the quarterfinals, before losing to Texas Southern in the semifinals. They received an invitation to the CIT, where they defeated Austin Peay in the quarterfinals, before losing to Norfolk State in the semifinals.

== Previous season ==
The Bulldogs finished the 2022–23 season 15–18, 10–8 in SWAC play, to finish in fifth place. In the SWAC tournament, they defeated Southern in the first round, before falling to eventual tournament champions Texas Southern in the semifinals.

== Roster ==
2023–24 Alabama A&M Bulldogs men's basketball team
Players
Coaches

Pos.	#	Name	Height	Weight	Year	Hometown
G	0	Jayland Randall	6 ft 5 in (1.96 m)	175 lb (79 kg)	So	Detroit, MI
G	1	Joshua Hughley	5 ft 9 in (1.75 m)	160 lb (73 kg)	Fr	Mobile, AL
G/F	2	Omari Peek	6 ft 6 in (1.98 m)	220 lb (100 kg)	Sr	Cincinnati, OH
G	3	Cameron Tucker	6 ft 1 in (1.85 m)	170 lb (77 kg)	GS	Birmingham, AL
G	4	Caleb Blackwell	6 ft 0 in (1.83 m)	185 lb (84 kg)	Fr	Buford, GA
G	5	London Riley	6 ft 3 in (1.91 m)	180 lb (82 kg)	Jr	Atlanta, GA
G	10	Anthony Bryant	6 ft 3 in (1.91 m)	195 lb (88 kg)	So	Shreveport, LA
F	11	Austin Harvell	6 ft 6 in (1.98 m)	215 lb (98 kg)	Jr	Athens, GA
G	12	Dylan Mclean	6 ft 4 in (1.93 m)	190 lb (86 kg)	Jr	Brooklyn, NY
F	13	Darius Osborne	6 ft 8 in (2.03 m)	185 lb (84 kg)	Jr	Louisville, KY
F	14	Ademola Oladipo	6 ft 6 in (1.98 m)	200 lb (91 kg)	Fr	Houston, TX
G/F	15	Dailin Smith	6 ft 6 in (1.98 m)	185 lb (84 kg)	Sr	Colorado Springs, CO
G	20	Bilal Abdur-Rahman	5 ft 11 in (1.8 m)	160 lb (73 kg)	Fr	Atlanta, GA
F	21	Clance Crosby	6 ft 9 in (2.06 m)	215 lb (98 kg)	Jr	Oklahoma City, OK
G/F	22	Lorenzo Downey	6 ft 5 in (1.96 m)	215 lb (98 kg)	Jr	Dartmouth, NS
F	23	Chad Moodie	6 ft 8 in (2.03 m)	225 lb (102 kg)	Fr	Atlanta, GA
G	24	Eric Lee	6 ft 4 in (1.93 m)	195 lb (88 kg)	Jr	Tampa, FL
G	25	Josh Bell	6 ft 1 in (1.85 m)	165 lb (75 kg)	Fr	Mobile, AL
C	30	William Tavares	6 ft 10 in (2.08 m)	250 lb (113 kg)	Jr	Praia, Cape Verde
G	31	Nari Jordan	6 ft 8 in (2.03 m)	215 lb (98 kg)	Jr	Jacksonville, FL
C	34	EJ Williams	6 ft 10 in (2.08 m)	275 lb (125 kg)	GS	Cincinnati, OH
G	55	Aaron Smith	6 ft 4 in (1.93 m)	185 lb (84 kg)	Fr	Atlanta, GA

Head coach

- Otis Hughley Jr. (West Alabama)

Assistant coach(es)

- Cal Cochran (Chattanooga)
- Rodney Broughton Jr. (South Alabama)
- Brandon Houston (Alabama A&M)

Legend

- (C) Team captain
- (S) Suspended
- (I) Ineligible
- (W) Walk-on
- Injured
- Current redshirt

Roster
Last update: October 24, 2023

== Schedule and results ==
Date time, TV	Rank^{#}	Opponent^{#}	Result	Record	Site (attendance) city, state
Exhibition
November 6, 2023*; 7:00 p.m.		Oakwood	W 111–59		Alabama A&M Events Center (3,573); Huntsville, AL
Non-conference regular season
November 9, 2023*; 7:00 p.m., ESPN+		at North Alabama	L 67–83	0–1	CB&S Bank Arena (1,366); Florence, AL
November 18, 2023*; 4:00 p.m., ESPN+		at Lipscomb	L 81–106	0–2	Allen Arena (823); Nashville, TN
November 21, 2023*; 7:00 p.m., ESPN+/SECN+		at Auburn	L 54–84	0–3	Neville Arena (9,121); Auburn, AL
November 24, 2023*; 7:00 p.m.		vs. East Tennessee State; Viking Invitational	L 71–82	0–4	Wolstein Center (597); Cleveland, OH
November 25, 2023*; 6:00 p.m., ESPN+		at Cleveland State; Viking Invitational	L 59–86	0–5	Wolstein Center (1,466); Cleveland, OH
November 29, 2023*; 7:00 p.m.		Tennessee State	W 85–83 ^{OT}	1–5	Alabama A&M Events Center (3,647); Huntsville, AL
December 2, 2023*; 1:00 p.m.		at Vanderbilt	L 59–78	1–6	Memorial Gymnasium (5,468); Nashville, TN
December 9, 2023*; 3:00 p.m., ACCN		at Georgia Tech	L 49–70	1–7	McCamish Pavilion (3,919); Atlanta, GA
December 11, 2023*; 6:30 p.m., ESPN+		at Samford	L 91–118	1–8	Pete Hanna Center (1,763); Homewood, AL
December 13, 2023*; 7:00 p.m.		UAB	L 82–93	1–9	Alabama A&M Events Center (2,893); Huntsville, AL
December 16, 2023*; 7:00 p.m.		Chattanooga	L 72–88	1–10	Alabama A&M Events Center (1,227); Huntsville, AL
December 21, 2023*; 7:00 p.m., ESPN+		at South Alabama	L 67–73	1–11	Mitchell Center (1,069); Mobile, AL
December 30, 2023*; 6:00 p.m., SECN+		at Georgia	L 73–93	1–12	Stegeman Coliseum (7,793); Athens, GA
SWAC regular season
January 6, 2024; 5:30 p.m.		at Arkansas–Pine Bluff	W 63–62	2–12 (1–0)	H.O. Clemmons Arena (1,302); Pine Bluff, AR
January 8, 2024; 7:30 p.m.		at Mississippi Valley State	W 78–70	3–12 (2–0)	Harrison HPER Complex (1,992); Itta Bena, MS
January 11, 2024; 7:30 p.m.		Alcorn State	L 71–74	3–13 (2–1)	Alabama A&M Events Center (3,239); Huntsville, AL
January 13, 2024; 5:00 p.m.		Jackson State	L 67–75	3–14 (2–2)	Alabama A&M Events Center (2,507); Huntsville, AL
January 15, 2024; 6:30 p.m.		vs. Alabama State; Bridge Builder Classic	L 55–72	3–15 (2–3)	Mitchell Center (2,900); Mobile, AL
January 27, 2024; 5:00 p.m.		at Texas Southern	L 69–85	3–16 (2–4)	H&PE Arena (3,109); Houston, TX
January 29, 2024; 8:00 p.m.		at Prairie View A&M	L 76–87	3–17 (2–5)	William J. Nicks Building (1,926); Prairie View, TX
February 3, 2024; 5:00 p.m.		Florida A&M	W 73–61	4–17 (3–5)	Alabama A&M Events Center (3,913); Huntsville, AL
February 5, 2024; 7:00 p.m.		Bethune–Cookman	W 72–68	5–17 (4–5)	Alabama A&M Events Center (2,019); Huntsville, AL
February 10, 2024; 5:30 p.m.		at Southern	L 62–69	5–18 (4–6)	F. G. Clark Center (3,983); Baton Rouge, LA
February 12, 2024; 7:30 p.m.		at Grambling State	W 60–50	6–18 (5–6)	Fredrick C. Hobdy Assembly Center (723); Grambling, LA
February 17, 2024; 2:00 p.m.		Mississippi Valley State	W 80–57	7–18 (6–6)	Alabama A&M Events Center (1,817); Huntsville, AL
February 19, 2024; 7:00 p.m.		Arkansas–Pine Bluff	W 75–67	8–18 (7–6)	Alabama A&M Events Center (1,733); Huntsville, AL
February 24, 2024; 3:00 p.m.		at Bethune–Cookman	L 61–63	8–19 (7–7)	Moore Gymnasium (771); Daytona Beach, FL
February 26, 2024; 7:00 p.m.		at Florida A&M	L 58–76	8–20 (7–8)	Al Lawson Center (2,287); Tallahassee, FL
March 2, 2024; 5:00 p.m.		Alabama State	W 58–53	9–20 (8–8)	Alabama A&M Events Center (6,389); Huntsville, AL
March 7, 2024; 7:00 p.m.		Grambling State	L 73–74	9–21 (8–9)	Alabama A&M Events Center (3,213); Huntsville, AL
March 9, 2024; 5:00 p.m.		Southern	W 66–56	10–21 (9–9)	Alabama A&M Events Center (1,855); Huntsville, AL
SWAC tournament
March 13, 2023; 2:00 p.m., ESPN+	(7)	vs. (2) Alcorn State; Quarterfinals	W 75–63	11–21	Bartow Arena (784); Birmingham, AL
March 15, 2023; 8:30 p.m., ESPN+	(7)	vs. (3) Texas Southern; Semifinals	L 65–72	11–22	Bartow Arena (2,045); Birmingham, AL
CIT
March 20, 2024*; 7:00 p.m., ESPN+		at Austin Peay; First round – Hugh Durham Classic	W 81–71	12–22	F&M Bank Arena (1,386); Clarksville, TN
March 23, 2024*; 3:00 p.m., ESPN+		at Norfolk State; Semifinals – John McLendon Classic	L 66–81	12–23	Joseph G. Echols Memorial Hall (1,522); Norfolk, VA
*Non-conference game. ^{#}Rankings from AP poll. (#) Tournament seedings in parentheses. All times are in Central.
