= Donte Jackson (basketball) =

American basketball player and coach (born 1979)

Current position
- Title: Head coach
- Team: Alabama A&M
- Conference: SWAC
- Record: 18–15 (.545)

Biographical details
- Born: January 19, 1979 (age 47); Milwaukee, Wisconsin, U.S.

Playing career
- 1997–1998: Milwaukee
- 1999–2002: Central State

Coaching career (HC unless noted)
- 2003–2010: Central State (assistant)
- 2010–2014: Central State
- 2014–2017: Stillman
- 2017–2025: Grambling State
- 2025–present: Alabama A&M

Administrative career (AD unless noted)
- 2016–2017: Stillman

Head coaching record
- Overall: 276–202 (.577)
- Tournaments: 1–1 (NCAA Division I); 1–1 (NCAA Division II); 0–1 (CIT)

Accomplishments and honors

Championships
- SWAC tournament (2024); 3× SWAC regular season (2018, 2023, 2024)

Awards
- 2× Ben Jobe Award (2018, 2024); 3× SWAC Coach of the Year (2018, 2023, 2024)

Donte Jackson (born January 19, 1979) is an American college basketball coach, currently head coach for the Alabama A&M Bulldogs of the Southwestern Athletic Conference (SWAC). He was previously head coach of the Grambling State Tigers. In 2024, he led the Tigers to their first SWAC tournament championship in program history and their first ever NCAA Division I men's basketball tournament.

== Playing career ==
After a standout high school career in his hometown of Milwaukee, Wisconsin, Jackson attended Milwaukee for one season. Jackson transferred to Central State where he was an all-conference and all-region selection during the 2001–2002 season, and part of the Marauders' NAIA Division I National Tournament Sweet 16 squad from the 1999–2000 season.

== Coaching career ==
After his playing career, Jackson became an assistant coach at his alma mater, and was in the position for seven years before being elevated to head coach in 2010. In his four years at Central State, Jackson compiled a 60–42 record, before accepting the head coaching position at Stillman. In two seasons as a member of the SIAC, Jackson led Stillman to a 44–16 record, winning the SIAC men's basketball tournament championship in 2016 and reaching the regional semifinals of the 2016 NCAA Division II men's basketball tournament. After 2016, the school dropped from NCAA Division II to NAIA. In its first year as a NAIA Independent, Jackson guided the team to a 22–5 record.

On June 28, 2017, Jackson was officially named the head coach at Grambling State.

In his first year with the Tigers, Jackson guided Grambling to its first SWAC regular season title since 1989. However, due to low APR scores, Grambling was ineligible for conference tournament and postseason play. For his efforts, Jackson was named 2018 SWAC Coach of the Year, and was the recipient of the 2018 Ben Jobe Award, as well.

Jackson announced his departure for Alabama A&M on April 3, 2025.

== Head coaching record ==
=== NCAA DII/NAIA ===
Record table
Season	Team	Overall	Conference	Standing	Postseason
Central State Marauders (Division II Independent/G-MAC) (2010–2014)
2010–11	Central State	14–12	N/A		
2011–12	Central State	19–9	N/A		
2012–13	Central State	11–10*	2–2	2nd	
2013–14	Central State	16–11**	7–5	3rd	
Central State:		60–42 (.588)	9–7 (.563)		
Stillman Tigers (Southern Intercollegiate Athletic Conference) (2014–2016)
2014–15	Stillman	17–10	13–6	1st (West)	
2015–16	Stillman	27–6	17–1	1st (West)	NCAA Division II Round of 32
Stillman Tigers (NAIA Independent) (2016–2017)
2016–17	Stillman	22–5	–	–	
Stillman:		66–21 (.759)	30–7 (.811)		
Total:		126–63 (.667)			
National champion Postseason invitational champion Conference regular season champion Conference regular season and conference tournament champion Division regular season champion Division regular season and conference tournament champion Conference tournament champion

- Six wins vacated by NCAA
  - Two wins vacated by NCAA

=== NCAA DI ===
Record table
Season	Team	Overall	Conference	Standing	Postseason
Grambling State Tigers (Southwestern Athletic Conference) (2017–2025)
2017–18	Grambling State	17–14	13–5	1st	
2018–19	Grambling State	17–17	10–8	T–3rd	CIT First Round
2019–20	Grambling State	17–15	11–7	T–4th	
2020–21	Grambling State	12–12	9–6	4th	
2021–22	Grambling State	12–20	9–9	T–6th	
2022–23	Grambling State	24–9	15–3	T–1st	
2023–24	Grambling State	21–15	14–4	1st	NCAA Division I Round of 64
2024–25	Grambling State	12–22	7–11	8th	
Grambling State:		132–124 (.516)	88–53 (.624)		
Alabama A&M Bulldogs (Southwestern Athletic Conference) (2025–present)
2025–26	Alabama A&M	18–15	10–8	T–4th	
Alabama A&M:		18–15 (.545)	10–8 (.556)		
Total:		150–139 (.519)			
National champion Postseason invitational champion Conference regular season champion Conference regular season and conference tournament champion Division regular season champion Division regular season and conference tournament champion Conference tournament champion
