= 2012–13 Western Illinois Leathernecks men's basketball team =

American college basketball season

2012–13 Western Illinois Leathernecks men's basketball

Summit League regular season co–champions

CBI, First round
- Conference: The Summit League
- Record: 22–9 (13–3 The Summit)
- Head coach: Jim Molinari (5th season)
- Assistant coaches: Billy Wright; Wade Hokenson; Josh Wolfe
- Home arena: Western Hall

2012–13 Summit League men's basketball standings
	Conf.				Overall
Team	W		L	PCT	W		L	PCT
South Dakota State †	13	–	3	.813	25	–	10	.714
Western Illinois	13	–	3	.813	22	–	9	.710
North Dakota State	12	–	4	.750	24	–	10	.706
Oakland	10	–	6	.625	16	–	17	.485
IPFW	7	–	9	.438	16	–	17	.485
Omaha *	6	–	10	.375	11	–	20	.355
UMKC	5	–	11	.313	8	–	24	.250
South Dakota	5	–	11	.313	10	–	20	.333
IUPUI	1	–	15	.063	6	–	26	.188
† 2013 Summit League Tournament winner Rankings from AP Poll * Ineligible for postseason due to program transition to NCAA Division I

The 2012–13 Western Illinois Leathernecks men's basketball team represented Western Illinois University during the 2012–13 NCAA Division I men's basketball season. The Leathernecks, led by fifth year head coach Jim Molinari, played their home games at Western Hall and were members of The Summit League.

They finished the season 22–9, 13–3 in Summit League play to claim a share of the regular season conference title. They advanced to the semifinals of The Summit League tournament where they lost to North Dakota State. They were invited to the 2013 College Basketball Invitational where they lost in the first round to Purdue.

== Roster ==
Number	Name	Position	Height	Weight	Year	Hometown
10	Jordan Foster	Guard	5–11	175	Freshman	Chicago, Illinois
11	Jamaal Walker	Guard	6–0	165	Freshman	Freeport, Bahamas
12	Jason Hawthorne	Guard	6–0	170	Freshman	Houston, Texas
14	Bully Molinari	Guard	6–2	190	Junior	Peoria, Illinois
15	Isaiah Duncan	Guard	6–0	180	Freshman	Peoria, Illinois
23	Ceola Clark III	Guard	6–3	195	Senior	Gurnee, Illinois
24	Remy Roberts-Burnett	Guard	6–0	180	Sophomore	Joliet, Illinois
30	John Schneider	Forward	6–7	200	Freshman	Barrington, Illinois
32	Jack Houpt	Forward	6–7	210	Senior	Chesterton, Indiana
33	Adam Link	Forward	6–6	220	Junior	Elbert, Colorado
34	Don McAvoy III	Forward	6–6	220	Senior	Chicago, Illinois
43	Terell Parks	Forward/Center	6–8	250	Senior	Beloit, Wisconsin
52	Michael Ochereobia	Center	6–8	260	Junior	Hackney, England

== Schedule ==
Date time, TV	Rank^{#}	Opponent^{#}	Result	Record	Site (attendance) city, state
Exhibition
November 1, 2012*; 7:00 p.m.		Harris–Stowe State	W 77–56		Western Hall (N/A); Macomb, IL
November 5, 2012*; 7:00 p.m.		Missouri S&T	L 60–61		Western Hall (563); Macomb, IL
Regular season
November 10, 2012*; 7:00 p.m.		Wabash	W 71–39	1–0	Western Hall (1,242); Macomb, IL
November 14, 2012*; 7:00 p.m.		at SIU Edwardsville	L 50–62	1–1	Vadalabene Center (1,706); Edwardsville, IL
November 16, 2012*; 5:00 p.m.		vs. Buffalo; Coaches Vs. Cancer Classic	W 67–58	2–1	Ford Center (4,112); Evansville, IN
November 17, 2012*; 7:30 p.m.		at Evansville; Coaches Vs. Cancer Classic	L 44–49	2–2	Ford Center (4,431); Evansville, IN
November 18, 2012*; 2:00 p.m.		vs. Yale; Coaches Vs. Cancer Classic	W 59–47	3–2	Johnson Center (428); Oakland City, IN
November 24, 2012*; 11:00 a.m.		at Savannah State	L 38–39	3–3	Tiger Arena (340); Savannah, GA
November 29, 2012; 7:00 p.m.		at South Dakota	W 73–71	4–3 (1–0)	DakotaDome (1,512); Vermillion, SD
December 1, 2012; 4:00 p.m.		at UMKC	W 68–63	5–3 (2–0)	Swinney Recreation Center (893); Kansas City, MO
December 5, 2012*; 7:00 p.m.		at Eastern Illinois	W 57–45	6–3	Lantz Arena (1,061); Charleston, IL
December 8, 2012*; 7:00 p.m.		SIU Edwardsville	W 55–38	7–3	Western Hall (1,786); Macomb, IL
December 18, 2012*; 7:00 p.m.		UIC	W 70–54	8–3	Western Hall (1,748); Macomb, IL
December 27, 2012; 7:00 p.m.		Oakland	W 73–63	9–3 (3–0)	Western Hall (1,883); Macomb, IL
December 29, 2012; 7:00 p.m.		IPFW	W 62–50	10–3 (4–0)	Western Hall (1,412); Macomb, IL
January 2, 2013*; 7:00 p.m.		Savannah State	W 39–35	11–3	Western Hall (1,236); Macomb, IL
January 5, 2013; 7:00 p.m.		IUPUI	W 57–53 ^{OT}	12–3 (5–0)	Western Hall (1,710); Macomb, IL
January 9, 2013*; 7:00 p.m.		Greenville	W 95–48	13–3	Western Hall (1,235); Macomb, IL
January 12, 2013; 11:30 a.m.		at Omaha	W 89–74	14–3 (6–0)	Ralston Arena (1,017); Ralston, NE
January 17, 2013; 7:00 p.m.		South Dakota State	L 53–59	14–4 (6–1)	Western Hall (4,163); Macomb, IL
January 19, 2013; 7:00 p.m.		North Dakota State	W 50–42	15–4 (7–1)	Western Hall (3,973); Macomb, IL
January 24, 2013; 6:00 p.m.		at IPFW	W 43–40	16–4 (8–1)	Allen County War Memorial Coliseum (1,094); Fort Wayne, IN
January 26, 2013; 4:00 p.m.		at Oakland	L 60–67	16–5 (8–2)	Athletics Center O'rena (3,325); Rochester, MI
February 2, 2013; 2:00 p.m.		at IUPUI	W 68–59	17–5 (9–2)	The Jungle (772); Indianapolis, IN
February 7, 2013; 7:00 p.m.		Omaha	W 68–50	18–5 (10–2)	Western Hall (2,431); Macomb, IL
February 14, 2013; 7:00 p.m.		at North Dakota State	W 49–36	19–5 (11–2)	Bison Sports Arena (3,218); Fargo, ND
February 16, 2013; 4:05 p.m.		at South Dakota State	L 55–64	19–6 (11–3)	Frost Arena (6,103); Brookings, SD
February 23, 2013*; 7:00 p.m.		Cleveland State; BracketBusters	L 54–60	19–7	Western Hall (4,259); Macomb, IL
February 28, 2013; 7:30 p.m.		UMKC	W 53–50	20–7 (12–3)	Western Hall (2,191); Macomb, IL
March 2, 2013; 7:00 p.m.		South Dakota	W 61–59	21–7 (13–3)	Western Hall (5,089); Macomb, IL
Summit League tournament
March 9, 2013; 8:30 p.m., FCS Atlantic	(2)	vs. (7) South Dakota; Quarterfinals	W 54–53	22–7	Sioux Falls Arena (6,704); Sioux Falls, SD
March 11, 2013; 8:30 p.m., FCS Atlantic	(2)	vs. (3) North Dakota State; Semifinals	L 43–55	22–8	Sioux Falls Arena (6,676); Sioux Falls, SD
CBI
March 20, 2013*; 6:00 p.m., AXS TV		at Purdue; First Round	L 67–81	22–9	Mackey Arena (3,046); West Lafayette, IN
*Non-conference game. ^{#}Rankings from AP Poll. (#) Tournament seedings in parentheses. All times are in Central Time.
