= 2012–13 Oakland Golden Grizzlies men's basketball team =

American college basketball season

2012–13 Oakland Golden Grizzlies men's basketball

CIT, First round
- Conference: The Summit League
- Record: 16–17 (10–6 Summit)
- Head coach: Greg Kampe (29th season)
- Assistant coaches: Jeff Tungate; Darren Sorenson; Saddi Washington
- Home arena: Athletics Center O'rena

2012–13 Summit League men's basketball standings
	Conf.				Overall
Team	W		L	PCT	W		L	PCT
South Dakota State †	13	–	3	.813	25	–	10	.714
Western Illinois	13	–	3	.813	22	–	9	.710
North Dakota State	12	–	4	.750	24	–	10	.706
Oakland	10	–	6	.625	16	–	17	.485
IPFW	7	–	9	.438	16	–	17	.485
Omaha *	6	–	10	.375	11	–	20	.355
UMKC	5	–	11	.313	8	–	24	.250
South Dakota	5	–	11	.313	10	–	20	.333
IUPUI	1	–	15	.063	6	–	26	.188
† 2013 Summit League Tournament winner Rankings from AP Poll * Ineligible for postseason due to program transition to NCAA Division I

The 2012–13 Oakland Golden Grizzlies men's basketball team represented Oakland University during the 2012–13 NCAA Division I men's basketball season. The Golden Grizzlies, led by 29th year head coach Greg Kampe, played their home games at the Athletics Center O'rena and were members of The Summit League. They finished the season 16–17, 10–6 in The Summit League to finish in fourth place. They lost in the quarterfinals of The Summit League tournament to Fort Wayne. They were invited to the 2013 CIT where they lost in the first round to Youngstown State. This was the Golden Grizzlies last year as a member of The Summit League as they joined the Horizon League in the 2013–14 season.

== Preseason ==
Oakland was selected to finish third in The Summit League in the preseason poll of coaches, sports information directors and media. Junior guard Travis Bader was selected to the preseason all-league first team and senior forward Drew Valentine was selected to the second team.

From the previous season's 20-win team that reached the CollegeInsider.com Tournament semifinals, Oakland lost starting point guard Reggie Hamilton and guard Laval Lucas-Perry to graduation. Then-redshirt freshman center Kyle Sikora transferred to Stetson in order to be closer to his family.

== Season ==
Sophomore center Corey Petros earned league Player of the Week honors on November 19. Petros earned his first career award averaging 18 points and 9.5 rebounds in road games against Boise State and Pittsburgh.

Junior guard Duke Mondy was named Player of the Week for the week of December 31.

After a 47-point performance and averaging 36.5 points per game the week of January 20, Bader was named National Player of the Week by ESPN's Dick Vitale, the Capital One Impact Performance of the Week and The Summit League's Player of the Week awards. In the 47-point game, Bader set an Oakland single-game record for three-point field goals made (11), scored the most points in a game in NCAA Division I this year and tied the league record for most three-pointers in a game. The 47 points were the third-highest total in Oakland history.

== Roster ==
Number	Name	Position	Height	Weight	Year	Hometown
2	Dante Williams	Forward	6′ 6″	187	Sophomore	Ann Arbor, Michigan
3	Travis Bader	Guard	6′ 5″	185	Junior	Okemos, Michigan
4	Korab Imami	Center	6′ 11″	215	Freshman	Peć, Kosovo
10	Duke Mondy	Guard	6′ 4″	197	Junior	Grand Rapids, Michigan
11	Jordan Howenstine	Guard	6′ 1″	162	Senior	Lansing, Michigan
12	Lloyd Neely II	Forward	6′ 5″	230	Freshman	Detroit, Michigan
15	Drew Valentine	Forward	6′ 5″	232	Senior	Lansing, Michigan
22	Mitch Baenziger	Guard	6′ 2″	191	Freshman	Clarkston, Michigan
23	Tommie McCune	Forward	6′ 8″	200	Sophomore	Saginaw, Michigan
24	Matt Poches	Guard	6′ 4″	203	Sophomore	Hartland, Michigan
33	Ryan Bass	Guard	5′ 10″	170	Junior	Dayton, Ohio
42	Corey Petros	Center/Forward	6′ 10″	233	Sophomore	Sterling Heights, Michigan
50	Ralph Hill	Forward	6′ 6″	215	Junior	Westerville, Ohio
52	Joey Asbury	Forward	6′ 7″	206	Junior	Warren, Michigan

== Schedule ==
Date time, TV	Rank^{#}	Opponent^{#}	Result	Record	Site (attendance) city, state
Exhibition
October 30, 2012*; 7:00 pm		Davenport	W 80–56	—	Athletics Center O'rena (N/A); Rochester, MI
November 6, 2012*; 7:00 pm		Defiance	W 90–77		Athletics Center O'rena (1,125); Rochester, MI
Regular season
November 9, 2012*; 7:30 pm		Albion	W 96–62	1–0	Athletics Center O'rena (2,265); Rochester, MI
November 11, 2012*; 5:00 pm		at Louisiana–Lafayette	L 79–90	1–1	Cajundome (2,025); Lafayette, LA
November 13, 2012*; 9:30 pm		at Boise State	L 80–88	1–2	Taco Bell Arena (2,616); Boise, ID
November 17, 2012*; 7:00 pm, Big East Network		at Pittsburgh	L 62–72 ^{OT}	1–3	Petersen Events Center (9,710); Pittsburgh, PA
November 20, 2012*; 8:00 pm		at Texas Southern	W 71–69	2–3	H&PE Arena (1,114); Houston, TX
November 23, 2012*; 8:15 pm, BTN		at No. 15 Michigan State	L 52–70	2–4	Breslin Student Events Center (14,797); East Lansing, MI
November 26, 2012*; 7:00 pm, FSD+/ESPN3		at Tennessee	L 50–77	2–5	Thompson–Boling Arena (14,625); Knoxville, TN
December 1, 2012*; 2:00 pm		at Western Michigan	L 72–76	2–6	University Arena (3,152); Kalamazoo, MI
December 6, 2012*; 7:00 pm		Rochester	W 88–77	3–6	Athletics Center O'rena (2,165); Rochester, MI
December 8, 2012*; 2:00 pm		at Ohio	L 61–78	3–7	Convocation Center (5,346); Athens, OH
December 17, 2012*; 7:00 pm		Valparaiso	W 70–68	4–7	Athletics Center O'rena (2,065); Rochester, MI
December 19, 2012*; 9:00 pm, ESPNU		at West Virginia	L 71–76	4–8	WVU Coliseum (4,982); Morgantown, WV
December 22, 2012*; 2:00 pm		at Eastern Michigan	W 59–57	5–8	EMU Convocation Center (830); Ypsilanti, MI
December 27, 2012; 8:00 pm		at Western Illinois	L 63–73	5–9 (0–1)	Western Hall (1,883); Macomb, IL
December 29, 2012; 3:00 pm		at IUPUI	W 84–62	6–9 (1–1)	Bankers Life Fieldhouse (690); Indianapolis, IN
January 3, 2013; 7:00 pm		Omaha	W 91–79	7–9 (2–1)	Athletics Center O'rena (2,015); Rochester, MI
January 5, 2013*; 4:00 pm, SEC Network/ESPN3		at Alabama	L 45–65	7–10	Coleman Coliseum (10,081); Tuscaloosa, AL
January 10, 2013; 8:00 pm		at South Dakota State	L 74–81	7–11 (2–2)	Frost Arena (3,819); Brookings, SD
January 12, 2013; 5:00 pm, Fox College Sports		at North Dakota State	L 65–73	7–12 (2–3)	Bison Sports Arena (3,390); Fargo, ND
January 17, 2013; 7:00 pm		Kansas City	W 81–68	8–12 (3–3)	Athletics Center O'rena (2,345); Rochester, MI
January 19, 2013; 6:00 pm		South Dakota	L 78–97	8–13 (3–4)	Athletics Center O'rena (2,515); Rochester, MI
January 24, 2013; 7:00 pm		IUPUI	W 89–71	9–13 (4–4)	Athletics Center O'rena (2,215); Rochester, MI
January 26, 2013; 5:00 pm, Fox Sports Detroit		Western Illinois; Homecoming	W 67–60	10–13 (5–4)	Athletics Center O'rena (3,325); Rochester, MI
February 2, 2013; 2:00 pm		at Omaha	W 96–81	11–13 (6–4)	Ralston Arena (1,209); Ralston, NE
February 7, 2013; 7:00 pm		North Dakota State	W 66–63	12–13 (7–4)	Athletics Center O'rena (2,117); Rochester, MI
February 9, 2013; 5:00 pm, Fox Sports Detroit		South Dakota State	W 88–83	13–13 (8–4)	Athletics Center O'rena (2,965); Rochester, MI
February 14, 2013; 8:00 pm		at South Dakota	W 76–75	14–13 (9–4)	DakotaDome (1,344); Vermillion, SD
February 16, 2013; 7:15 pm, Fox College Sports		at Kansas City	W 86–74	15–13 (10–4)	Swinney Recreation Center (1,338); Kansas City, MO
February 20, 2013; 7:00 pm		at Fort Wayne	L 71–77	15–14 (10–5)	Allen County War Memorial Coliseum (1,493); Fort Wayne, IN
February 23, 2013*; 5:00 pm		Morehead State; BracketBusters	W 82–79 ^{OT}	16–14	Athletics Center O'rena (2,425); Rochester, MI
March 2, 2013; 6:00 pm		IPFW	L 72–74	16–15 (10–6)	Athletics Center O'rena (3,315); Rochester, MI
Summit League tournament
March 10, 2013; 7:00 pm, FCS Atlantic	(4)	vs. (5) IPFW; Quarterfinals	L 72–91	16–16	Sioux Falls Arena (3,786); Sioux Falls, SD
CollegeInsider.com tournament
March 19, 2013*; 7:05 pm		at Youngstown State; First round	L 87–99	16–17	Beeghly Center (3,056); Youngstown, OH
*Non-conference game. ^{#}Rankings from AP Poll. (#) Tournament seedings in parentheses. All times are in Eastern Time.
