= 2012–13 South Dakota Coyotes men's basketball team =

American college basketball season

2012–13 South Dakota Coyotes men's basketball
- Conference: The Summit League
- Record: 10–20 (5–11 The Summit)
- Head coach: Dave Boots (25th season)
- Assistant coaches: Joey James; Chris Kassin; Shawn Dirden
- Home arena: DakotaDome

2012–13 Summit League men's basketball standings
	Conf.				Overall
Team	W		L	PCT	W		L	PCT
South Dakota State †	13	–	3	.813	25	–	10	.714
Western Illinois	13	–	3	.813	22	–	9	.710
North Dakota State	12	–	4	.750	24	–	10	.706
Oakland	10	–	6	.625	16	–	17	.485
IPFW	7	–	9	.438	16	–	17	.485
Omaha *	6	–	10	.375	11	–	20	.355
UMKC	5	–	11	.313	8	–	24	.250
South Dakota	5	–	11	.313	10	–	20	.333
IUPUI	1	–	15	.063	6	–	26	.188
† 2013 Summit League Tournament winner Rankings from AP Poll * Ineligible for postseason due to program transition to NCAA Division I

The 2012–13 South Dakota Coyotes men's basketball team represented the University of South Dakota during the 2012–13 NCAA Division I men's basketball season. The Coyotes, led by 25th year head coach Dave Boots, played their home games at the DakotaDome and were members of The Summit League. They finished the season 10–20, 5–11 in The Summit League play to finish in a tie for seventh place. They lost in the quarterfinals of The Summit League tournament to Western Illinois.

== Roster ==
Number	Name	Position	Height	Weight	Year	Hometown
1	Tyler Larson	Guard	6–3	185	Junior	Las Vegas, Nevada
2	Jordan Boots	Guard	6–1	157	Senior	Vermillion, South Dakota
3	Steve Tecker	Guard	6–5	205	Junior	Brule, Wisconsin
5	Juevol Mylers	Guard	6–1	190	Senior	Ajax, Ontario
11	Adam Thoseby	Forward	6–5	195	Sophomore	Henley-on-Thames, England
12	Brandon Bos	Guard	6–1	185	Sophomore	Markham, Ontario
14	Casey Kasperbauer	Guard	6–1	170	Freshman	Carroll, Iowa
15	Jared Bartling	Forward	6–8	234	Junior	Sioux Falls, South Dakota
21	Jack Foley	Guard	6–0	160	Sophomore	Centerville, South Dakota
22	Karim Rowson	Guard	6–5	195	Junior	New York City, New York
23	Tyler Flack	Forward	6–7	205	Freshman	Lakeville, Minnesota
41	Eric Robertson	Forward	6–8	190	Freshman	Wayzata, Minnesota
50	Trevor Gruis	Center	6–10	235	Junior	Ellsworth, Minnesota
	Trey Norris	Guard	6–0	170	Sophomore	Grand Prairie, Texas

== Schedule ==
Date time, TV	Rank^{#}	Opponent^{#}	Result	Record	Site (attendance) city, state
Regular season
11/14/2012*; 6:30 pm		vs. Southern; Global Sports Showcase	L 79–83	0–1	Arena-Auditorium (253); Laramie, WY
11/15/2012*; 8:15 pm		at Wyoming; Global Sports Showcase	L 51–71	0–2	Arena-Auditorium (4,747); Laramie, WY
11/16/2012*; 2:00 pm		vs. North Carolina Central; Global Sports Showcase	W 81–69	1–2	Arena-Auditorium (175); Laramie, WY
11/18/2012*; 3:00 pm, Root Sports		at No. 19 Gonzaga	L 58–96	1–3	McCarthey Athletic Center (6,000); Spokane, WA
11/23/2012*; 7:00 pm		Culver–Stockton	W 81–73	2–3	DakotaDome (1,050); Vermillion, SD
11/24/2012*; 7:00 pm		Waldorf	W 84–59	3–3	DakotaDome (1,050); Vermillion, SD
11/29/2012; 7:00 pm, FCS		Western Illinois	L 71–73	3–4 (0–1)	DakotaDome (1,512); Vermillion, SD
12/01/2012; 7:00 pm		IUPUI	W 88–68	4–4 (1–1)	DakotaDome (1,628); Vermillion, SD
12/04/2012*; 7:00 pm		at Iowa	L 63–87	4–5	Carver–Hawkeye Arena (11,269); Iowa City, IA
12/08/2012*; 12:00 pm		at Ball State	L 51–62	4–6	John E. Worthen Arena (2,884); Muncie, IN
12/15/2012*; 7:00 pm		Ball State	L 73–80	4–7	DakotaDome (1,831); Vermillion, SD
12/19/2012*; 7:00 pm		Morehead State	W 85–75	5–7	DakotaDome (1,578); Vermillion, SD
12/22/2012*; 7:00 pm		at Green Bay	L 55–72	5–8	Resch Center (2,247); Green Bay, WI
12/29/2012; 12:00 pm		at Nebraska–Omaha	W 95–72	6–8 (2–1)	Ralston Arena (1,026); Ralston, NE
12/31/2012*; 1:00 pm		at No. 25 Kansas State	L 50–70	6–9	Bramlage Coliseum (12,230); Manhattan, KS
01/03/2013; 7:00 pm		North Dakota State	L 66–92	6–10 (2–2)	DakotaDome (1,741); Vermillion, SD
01/05/2013; 4:05 pm		South Dakota State	W 74–71	7–10 (3–2)	DakotaDome (5,045); Vermillion, SD
01/12/2013; 7:00 pm		UMKC	L 86–90	7–11 (3–3)	DakotaDome (1,682); Vermillion, SD
01/17/2013; 6:00 pm		at IPFW	L 60–62	7–12 (3–4)	Allen County War Memorial Coliseum (1,337); Fort Wayne, IN
01/19/2013; 5:00 pm		at Oakland	W 97–78	8–12 (4–4)	Athletics Center O'rena (2,515); Rochester, MI
01/24/2013; 7:00 pm		Nebraska–Omaha	L 90–95	8–13 (4–5)	DakotaDome (1,530); Vermillion, SD
01/31/2013; 7:05 pm		at South Dakota State	L 54–67	8–14 (4–6)	Frost Arena (6,130); Brookings, SD
02/02/2013; 7:00 pm		at North Dakota State	L 46–65	8–15 (4–7)	Bison Sports Arena (3,062); Fargo, ND
02/09/2013; 5:15 pm		at UMKC	L 65–80	8–16 (4–8)	Swinney Recreation Center (1,400); Kansas City, MO
02/14/2013; 7:00 pm		Oakland	L 75–76	8–17 (4–9)	DakotaDome (1,344); Vermillion, SD
02/16/2013; 7:00 pm		IPFW	L 51–64	8–18 (4–10)	DakotaDome (1,815); Vermillion, SD
02/24/2013*; 2:00 pm		at Montana State; BracketBusters	W 85–74	9–18	Worthington Arena (2,117); Bozeman, MT
02/28/2013; 6:30 pm		at IUPUI	W 87–69	10–18 (5–10)	The Jungle (639); Indianapolis, IN
03/02/2013; 7:00 pm		at Western Illinois	L 59–61	10–19 (5–11)	Western Hall (5,089); Macomb, IL
2013 The Summit League men's basketball tournament
03/09/2013; 8:30 pm, FCS Atlantic		vs. Western Illinois; Quarterfinals	L 53–54	10–20	Sioux Falls Arena (6,704); Sioux Falls, SD
*Non-conference game. ^{#}Rankings from AP Poll. (#) Tournament seedings in parentheses. All times are in Central Time.
