= 2012–13 North Dakota State Bison men's basketball team =

American college basketball season

2012–13 North Dakota State Bison men's basketball

CBI, First Round
- Conference: The Summit League
- Record: 24–10 (12–4 The Summit)
- Head coach: Saul Phillips (6th season)
- Assistant coaches: David Richman; Jason Kemp; Will Ryan
- Home arena: Bison Sports Arena

2012–13 Summit League men's basketball standings
	Conf.				Overall
Team	W		L	PCT	W		L	PCT
South Dakota State †	13	–	3	.813	25	–	10	.714
Western Illinois	13	–	3	.813	22	–	9	.710
North Dakota State	12	–	4	.750	24	–	10	.706
Oakland	10	–	6	.625	16	–	17	.485
IPFW	7	–	9	.438	16	–	17	.485
Omaha *	6	–	10	.375	11	–	20	.355
UMKC	5	–	11	.313	8	–	24	.250
South Dakota	5	–	11	.313	10	–	20	.333
IUPUI	1	–	15	.063	6	–	26	.188
† 2013 Summit League Tournament winner Rankings from AP Poll * Ineligible for postseason due to program transition to NCAA Division I

The 2012–13 North Dakota State Bison men's basketball team represented North Dakota State University in the 2012–13 NCAA Division I men's basketball season. The Bison, led by sixth year head coach Saul Phillips, played their home games at the Bison Sports Arena, with one home game at the Fargodome, and were members of The Summit League. They finished the season 24–10, 12–4 in Summit League play to finish in third place. They advanced to the championship game of The Summit League tournament where they lost to South Dakota State. They were invited to the 2013 College Basketball Invitational where they lost in the first round to Western Michigan in overtime.

== Roster ==
Number	Name	Position	Height	Weight	Year	Hometown
0	Fred Newell	Guard	5–8	155	Junior	Lakeville, Minnesota
3	Mike Felt	Guard	6–3	185	Junior	Redwood Falls, Minnesota
12	Lawrence Alexander	Guard	6–3	175	Sophomore	Peoria, Illinois
13	Nate Zastrow	Guard	6–0	175	Senior	Manitowoc, Wisconsin
22	Kory Brown	Guard	6–4	190	Freshman	Hoffman Estates, Illinois
23	Brett Vanden Bergh	Forward	6–5	210	Freshman	De Pere, Wisconsin
24	Taylor Braun	Guard	6–7	205	Junior	Newberg, Oregon
25	Joel Lindberg	Guard	6–2	190	Sophomore	Superior, Wisconsin
32	TrayVonn Wright	Forward	6–7	180	Junior	Waterloo, Iowa
34	Chris Kading	Forward	6–8	220	Freshman	De Pere, Wisconsin
40	Dexter Werner	Forward	6–6	240	Freshman	Bismarck, North Dakota
42	Marshall Bjorklund	Forward	6–8	240	Junior	Arlington, Minnesota
44	Jordan Aaberg	Forward	6–9	225	Junior	Rothsay, Minnesota

== Schedule ==
Date time, TV	Opponent	Result	Record	Site (attendance) city, state
Exhibition
11/01/2012*; 7:00 pm	Concordia–Moorhead	W 86–57		Bison Sports Arena (1,689); Fargo, ND
11/03/2012*; 7:00 pm	Minnesota State–Moorhead	W 72–67 ^{OT}		Bison Sports Arena (2,156); Fargo, ND
Regular season
11/09/2012*; 8:00 pm	Valley City State	W 93–47	1–0	Bison Sports Arena (1,782); Fargo, ND
11/12/2012*; 6:00 pm, BTN	at No. 1 Indiana; Legends Classic	L 61–87	1–1	Assembly Hall (17,145); Bloomington, IN
11/17/2012*; 5:00 pm	Mayville State	W 73–40	2–1	Bison Sports Arena (1,568); Fargo, ND
11/19/2012*; 3:30 pm	vs. Youngstown State; Legends Classic	W 83–80 ^{OT}	3–1	Palumbo Center (2,166); Pittsburgh, PA
11/20/2012*; 6:00 pm	at Duquesne; Legends Classic	W 57–43	4–1	Palumbo Center (2,060); Pittsburgh, PA
11/21/2012*; 3:30 pm	vs. James Madison; Legends Classic	W 66–44	5–1	Palumbo Center (2,325); Pittsburgh, PA
11/24/2012*; 7:00 pm	at Green Bay	L 59–74	5–2	Resch Center (2,455); Green Bay, WI
11/29/2012; 7:00 pm	Nebraska–Omaha	W 95–51	6–2 (1–0)	Bison Sports Arena (2,576); Fargo, ND
12/05/2012*; 6:00 pm	at Morehead State	W 69–57	7–2	Ellis Johnson Arena (1,240); Morehead, KY
12/09/2012*; 4:00 pm	North Dakota	W 72–52	8–2	Fargodome (5,168); Fargo, ND
12/11/2012*; 8:00 pm, BTN	at No. 13 Minnesota	L 57–70	8–3	Williams Arena (10,472); Minneapolis, MN
12/15/2012*; 6:00 pm	at Towson	W 65–48	9–3	Tiger Arena (1,634); Towson, MD
12/21/2012*; 7:00 pm	Morehead State	W 69–49	10–3	Bison Sports Arena (2,214); Fargo, ND
12/29/2012; 7:00 pm	South Dakota State	W 65–62	11–3 (2–0)	Bison Sports Arena (5,064); Fargo, ND
01/03/2013; 7:00 pm, Midco Sports Net	at South Dakota	W 92–66	12–3 (3–0)	DakotaDome (1,741); Vermillion, SD
01/05/2013; 5:15 pm	at UMKC	W 63–44	13–3 (4–0)	Swinney Recreation Center (1,118); Kansas City, MO
01/10/2013; 7:00 pm, Midco Sports Net/FCS	IPFW	W 67–55	14–3 (5–0)	Bison Sports Arena (2,690); Fargo, ND
01/12/2013; 4:00 pm, Midco Sports Net/FCS	Oakland	W 73–65	15–3 (6–0)	Bison Sports Arena (3,390); Fargo, ND
01/17/2013; 6:00 pm	at IUPUI	W 78–40	16–3 (7–0)	The Jungle (1,312); Indianapolis, IN
01/19/2013; 7:00 pm	at Western Illinois	L 42–50	16–4 (7–1)	Western Hall (3,973); Macomb, IL
01/26/2013; 2:05 pm, Midco Sports Net/FCS	at South Dakota State	L 53–69	16–5 (7–2)	Frost Arena (6,063); Brookings, SD
01/31/2013; 7:00 pm	UMKC	W 71–34	17–5 (8–2)	Bison Sports Arena (1,741); Fargo, ND
02/02/2013; 7:00 pm	South Dakota	W 65–46	18–5 (9–2)	Bison Sports Arena (3,062); Fargo, ND
02/07/2013; 6:00 pm	at Oakland	L 63–66	18–6 (9–3)	Athletics Center O'rena (2,117); Rochester, MI
02/09/2013; 6:00 pm	at IPFW	W 58–54	19–6 (10–3)	Allen County War Memorial Coliseum (1,176); Fort Wayne, IN
02/14/2013; 7:00 pm	Western Illinois	L 36–49	19–7 (10–4)	Bison Sports Arena (3,218); Fargo, ND
02/16/2013; 7:00 pm	IUPUI	W 75–39	20–7 (11–4)	Bison Sports Arena (2,948); Fargo, ND
02/22/2013*; 6:00 pm, ESPN2	at Akron; BracketBusters	L 53–68	20–8	James A. Rhodes Arena (4,474); Akron, OH
02/26/2013*; 7:00 pm	Utah Valley	W 63–56	21–8	Bison Sports Arena (2,351); Fargo, ND
03/02/2013; 4:00 pm, Midco Sports Net/FCS	at Nebraska–Omaha	W 84–57	22–8 (12–4)	Ralston Arena (1,426); Ralston, NE
2013 The Summit League men's basketball tournament
03/10/2013; 8:30 pm, FCS Atlantic	vs. UMKC; Quarterfinals	W 69–58	23–8	Sioux Falls Arena (3,786); Sioux Falls, SD
03/11/2013; 8:30 pm, FCS Atlantic	vs. Western Illinois; Semifinals	W 55–43	24–8	Sioux Falls Arena (6,676); Sioux Falls, SD
03/12/2013; 8:00 pm, ESPN2	vs. South Dakota State; Championship Game	L 67–73	24–9	Sioux Falls Arena (6,544); Sioux Falls, SD
2013 College Basketball Invitational
03/20/2013*; 6:00 pm	at Western Michigan; First round	L 71–72 ^{OT}	24–10	University Arena (1,358); Kalamazoo, MI
*Non-conference game. ^{#}Rankings from AP Poll. (#) Tournament seedings in parentheses. All times are in Central Time.
