= 2012–13 Omaha Mavericks men's basketball team =

American college basketball season

2012–13 Omaha Mavericks men's basketball
- Conference: The Summit League
- Record: 11–20 (6–10 The Summit)
- Head coach: Derrin Hansen (8th season)
- Home arena: Ralston Arena

2012–13 Summit League men's basketball standings
| | Conf. | | | | Overall |
| Team | W | | L | PCT | W | | L | PCT |
|---|---|---|---|---|---|---|---|---|
| South Dakota State † | 13 | – | 3 | .813 | 25 | – | 10 | .714 |
| Western Illinois | 13 | – | 3 | .813 | 22 | – | 9 | .710 |
| North Dakota State | 12 | – | 4 | .750 | 24 | – | 10 | .706 |
| Oakland | 10 | – | 6 | .625 | 16 | – | 17 | .485 |
| IPFW | 7 | – | 9 | .438 | 16 | – | 17 | .485 |
| Omaha * | 6 | – | 10 | .375 | 11 | – | 20 | .355 |
| UMKC | 5 | – | 11 | .313 | 8 | – | 24 | .250 |
| South Dakota | 5 | – | 11 | .313 | 10 | – | 20 | .333 |
| IUPUI | 1 | – | 15 | .063 | 6 | – | 26 | .188 |
† 2013 Summit League Tournament winner Rankings from AP Poll * Ineligible for postseason due to program transition to NCAA Division I

The 2012–13 Omaha Mavericks men's basketball team represented the University of Nebraska at Omaha during the 2012–13 NCAA Division I men's basketball season. The Mavericks, led by eighth year head coach Derrin Hansen, played their home games at the Ralston Arena and were members of The Summit League.

As part of their transition from Division II to Division I, the Mavericks were not eligible for The Summit League tournament or other postseason play. They finished the season 11–20, 6–10 in The Summit League play to finish in sixth place.

== Roster ==
| Number | Name | Position | Height | Weight | Year | Hometown |
|---|---|---|---|---|---|---|
| 0 | Koang Doluony | Forward | 6–8 | 195 | Senior | Omaha, Nebraska |
| 1 | Jalen Bradley | Guard | 6–0 | 180 | Freshman | Norfolk, Nebraska |
| 4 | Alex Phillips | Guard | 6–3 | 190 | Junior | Smiths Station, Alabama |
| 10 | CJ Carter | Guard | 6–0 | 180 | Sophomore | Omaha, Nebraska |
| 11 | Jacques Coleman | Guard | 5–11 | 165 | Senior | Milwaukee, Wisconsin |
| 12 | Caleb Steffensmeier | Guard | 6–1 | 170 | Junior | Omaha, Nebraska |
| 21 | Justin Simmons | Guard | 6–3 | 190 | Junior | Milwaukee, Wisconsin |
| 23 | Marcus Tyus | Guard | 6–1 | 175 | Freshman | Ramsey, Minnesota |
| 25 | Tyler Egli | Guard | 6–4 | 190 | Senior | Ankeny, Iowa |
| 31 | Alex Wellhouse | Forward | 6–7 | 220 | Senior | Kaukauna, Wisconsin |
| 40 | Simon Krych | Forward | 6–8 | 225 | Freshman | St. Cloud, Minnesota |
| 42 | Matt Hagerbaumer | Forward | 6–7 | 230 | Junior | Lincoln, Nebraska |
| 44 | John Karhoff | Center | 6–8 | 235 | Junior | Omaha, Nebraska |
| 50 | Mike Rostampour | Forward | 6–8 | 215 | Junior | West St. Paul, Minnesota |

== Schedule ==
| Date time, TV | Opponent | Result | Record | Site (attendance) city, state |
Exhibition
| 11/09/2012*; 7:00 pm | Northern Illinois; Homecoming | W 77–64 | 1–0 | Ralston Arena (2,224); Ralston, NE |
| 11/11/2012*; 6:00 pm | Saint Mary | L 86–96 | 1–1 | Ralston Arena (944); Ralston, NE |
| 11/14/2012*; 7:00 pm, FS Southwest + | at Texas Tech | L 63–91 | 1–2 | United Spirit Arena (7,053); Lubbock, TX |
| 11/16/2012*; 12:30 pm | at Tulane; Joe Cipriano Nebraska Classic | L 52–76 | 1–3 | Avron B. Fogelman Arena (2,637); New Orleans, LA |
| 11/18/2012*; 2:00 pm, BTN | at Nebraska; Joe Cipriano Nebraska Classic | L 62–75 | 1–4 | Bob Devaney Sports Center (6,961); Lincoln, NE |
| 11/23/2012*; 4:30 pm | vs. Bethune–Cookman; Joe Cipriano Nebraska Classic | L 81–93 | 1–5 | Athletics–Recreation Center (2,477); Valparaiso, IN |
| 11/24/2012*; 4:30 pm | vs. Chicago State; Joe Cipriano Nebraska Classic | W 68–66 | 2–5 | Athletics–Recreation Center (2,088); Valparaiso, IN |
| 11/29/2012; 7:00 pm | at North Dakota State | L 51–95 | 2–6 (0–1) | Bison Sports Arena (2,576); Fargo, ND |
| 12/01/2012; 7:00 pm | at South Dakota State | L 63–78 | 2–7 (0–2) | Frost Arena (3,021); Brookings, SD |
| 12/04/2012*; 7:00 pm, ESPN3 | at Wisconsin | L 40–86 | 2–8 | Kohl Center (16,546); Madison, WI |
| 12/09/2012*; 6:00 pm | at Iowa State | L 65–93 | 2–9 | Hilton Coliseum (12,785); Ames, IA |
| 12/15/2012*; 5:00 pm | at Denver | L 47–82 | 2–10 | Magness Arena (4,244); Denver, CO |
| 12/18/2012*; 7:00 pm | Benedictine | W 74–70 | 3–10 | Ralston Arena (1,068); Ralston, NE |
| 12/22/2012*; 7:00 pm | at Texas–Pan American | L 72–80 | 3–11 | UTPA Fieldhouse (383); Edinburg, TX |
| 12/29/2012; 12:00 pm | South Dakota | L 72–95 | 3–12 (0–3) | Ralston Arena (1,026); Ralston, NE |
| 12/31/2012; 5:00 pm | UMKC | W 77–65 | 4–12 (1–3) | Ralston Arena (642); Ralston, NE |
| 01/03/2013; 6:00 pm | at Oakland | L 79–91 | 4–13 (1–4) | Athletics Center O'rena (2,015); Rochester, MI |
| 01/05/2013; 1:00 pm | at IPFW | L 78–96 | 4–14 (1–5) | Allen County War Memorial Coliseum (1,387); Fort Wayne, IN |
| 01/10/2013; 7:00 pm | IUPUI | W 90–79 | 5–14 (2–5) | Ralston Arena (916); Ralston, NE |
| 01/12/2013; 11:30 am | Western Illinois | L 74–89 | 5–15 (2–6) | Ralston Arena (1,017); Ralston, NE |
| 01/19/2013*; 9:00 pm | at Cal State Bakersfield | L 79–84 | 5–16 | Icardo Center (1,074); Bakersfield, CA |
| 01/24/2013; 7:00 pm | at South Dakota | W 95–90 | 6–16 (3–6) | DakotaDome (1,530); Vermillion, SD |
| 01/26/2013; 5:15 pm | at UMKC | W 67–59 | 7–16 (4–6) | Swinney Recreation Center (1,236); Kansas City, MO |
| 01/31/2013; 7:00 pm | IPFW | W 86–79 | 8–16 (5–6) | Ralston Arena (1,088); Ralston, NE |
| 02/02/2013; 1:00 pm | Oakland | L 81–96 | 8–17 (5–7) | Ralston Arena (1,209); Ralston, NE |
| 02/07/2013; 7:00 pm | at Western Illinois | L 50–68 | 8–18 (5–8) | Western Hall (2,431); Macomb, IL |
| 02/09/2013; 2:00 pm | at IUPUI | W 85–78 | 9–18 (6–8) | The Jungle (683); Indianapolis, IN |
| 02/19/2013*; 7:00 pm | Chicago State | W 79–75 | 10–18 | Ralston Arena (820); Ralston, NE |
| 02/23/2013*; 1:00 pm | North Dakota; BracketBusters | W 83–75 | 11–18 | Ralston Arena (964); Ralston, NE |
| 02/28/2013; 7:00 pm, Midco Sports Network | South Dakota State | L 82–100 | 11–19 (6–9) | Ralston Arena (2,656); Ralston, NE |
| 03/02/2013; 4:00 pm, FCS | North Dakota State | L 57–84 | 11–20 (6–10) | Ralston Arena (1,426); Ralston, NE |
*Non-conference game. ^{#}Rankings from AP Poll. (#) Tournament seedings in parentheses. All times are in Central Time.
