= 2012–13 South Dakota State Jackrabbits men's basketball team =

American college basketball season

2012–13 South Dakota State Jackrabbits men's basketball

Summit League tournament champions Summit League Regular Season Co–Champions

NCAA Tournament, round of 64
- Conference: Summit League
- Record: 25–10 (13–3 The Summit)
- Head coach: Scott Nagy (18th season)
- Assistant coaches: Rob Klinkefus; Austin Hansen; Brian Cooley
- Home arena: Frost Arena

2012–13 Summit League men's basketball standings
	Conf.				Overall
Team	W		L	PCT	W		L	PCT
South Dakota State †	13	–	3	.813	25	–	10	.714
Western Illinois	13	–	3	.813	22	–	9	.710
North Dakota State	12	–	4	.750	24	–	10	.706
Oakland	10	–	6	.625	16	–	17	.485
IPFW	7	–	9	.438	16	–	17	.485
Omaha *	6	–	10	.375	11	–	20	.355
UMKC	5	–	11	.313	8	–	24	.250
South Dakota	5	–	11	.313	10	–	20	.333
IUPUI	1	–	15	.063	6	–	26	.188
† 2013 Summit League Tournament winner Rankings from AP Poll * Ineligible for postseason due to program transition to NCAA Division I

The 2012–13 South Dakota State Jackrabbits men's basketball team represented South Dakota State University during the 2012–13 NCAA Division I men's basketball season. The Jackrabbits, led by 18th year head coach Scott Nagy, played their home games at Frost Arena and were members of The Summit League. They finished the season 25–10, 13–3 in The Summit League play to finish in a tie for the regular season conference championship with Western Illinois. They were champions of The Summit League tournament, winning the championship game over North Dakota State, to earn an automatic bid to the 2013 NCAA tournament where they lost in the second round to Michigan.

== Roster ==
2012–13 South Dakota State Jackrabbits men's basketball team
Players
Coaches

Pos.	#	Name	Height	Weight	Year	Hometown
G/F	0	Matt Donlan	6 ft 6 in (1.98 m)	185 lb (84 kg)	Fr	Melbourne, Australia
G	3	Nate Wolters	6 ft 4 in (1.93 m)	190 lb (86 kg)	Sr	St. Cloud, Minnesota
G	4	Jake Bittle	6 ft 4 in (1.93 m)	200 lb (91 kg)	Fr	Bixby, Oklahoma
G	5	Taevaunn Prince	6 ft 3 in (1.91 m)	215 lb (98 kg)	So	Toronto, Ontario, Canada
G	10	Joshua White	6 ft 2 in (1.88 m)	175 lb (79 kg)	Fr	Edwardsville, Illinois
G	12	Brayden Carlson	6 ft 4 in (1.93 m)	205 lb (93 kg)	Jr	Brookings, South Dakota
G	13	Cory Jacobsen	6 ft 1 in (1.85 m)	185 lb (84 kg)	RS Fr	Viborg, South Dakota
G	23	Joey Feilmeier	6 ft 2 in (1.88 m)	170 lb (77 kg)	RS Fr	Jefferson, South Dakota
G/F	24	Zach Horstman	6 ft 6 in (1.98 m)	205 lb (93 kg)	So	Winner, South Dakota
G	25	Chad White	6 ft 6 in (1.98 m)	215 lb (98 kg)	Jr	Madison, South Dakota
F	30	Connor Devine	6 ft 10 in (2.08 m)	205 lb (93 kg)	Fr	Wasilla, Alaska
F	32	Marcus Heemstra	6 ft 9 in (2.06 m)	215 lb (98 kg)	Jr	Rock Valley, Iowa
F	34	Tony Fiegen	6 ft 7 in (2.01 m)	220 lb (100 kg)	Sr	Madison, South Dakota
F	42	Jordan Dykstra	6 ft 7 in (2.01 m)	220 lb (100 kg)	Jr	Rock Valley, Iowa

Head coach

- Scott Nagy (Delta State)

Assistant coach(es)

- Rob Klinkefus (Buena Vista)
- Austin Hansen (South Dakota State)
- Brian Cooley (Nebraska Wesleyan)

Legend

- (C) Team captain
- (S) Suspended
- (I) Ineligible
- (W) Walk-on
- Injured
- Current redshirt

Roster
Last update: 2012-03-13

== Schedule ==
Date time, TV	Rank^{#}	Opponent^{#}	Result	Record	Site (attendance) city, state
Exhibition
11/01/2012*; 8:30 pm		Black Hills State	W 89–66		Frost Arena (2,136); Brookings, SD
Regular season
11/09/2012*; 8:00 pm		at Alabama; 2K Sports Classic	L 67–70	0–1	Coleman Coliseum (11,669); Tuscaloosa, AL
11/13/2012*; 7:00 pm		Tennessee State	W 78–71	1–1	Frost Arena (3,193); Brookings, SD
11/16/2012*; 6:00 pm		at Hofstra; 2K Sports Classic	L 63–66	1–2	Mack Sports Complex (3,142); Hempstead, NY
11/17/2012*; 1:30 pm		vs. Marshall; 2K Sports Classic	W 78–77	2–2	Hofstra Arena (2,076); Hempstead, NY
11/18/2012*; 11:30 am		vs. U of D.C. 2K Sports Classic	W 96–48	3–2	Hofstra Arena (1,276); Hempstead, NY
11/21/2012*; 7:00 pm		Southwest Minnesota State	W 81–72	4–2	Frost Arena (2,525); Brookings, SD
11/28/2012*; 8:30 pm		North Dakota	W 71–70	5–2	Frost Arena (3,055); Brookings, SD
12/01/2012; 6:30 pm		Nebraska–Omaha	W 78–63	6–2 (1–0)	Frost Arena (3,021); Brookings, SD
12/04/2012*; 7:00 pm, ESPN3		at No. 14 Minnesota	L 64–88	6–3	Williams Arena (10,213); Minneapolis, MN
12/06/2012*; 7:00 pm		Dakota State	W 83–52	7–3	Frost Arena (1,866); Brookings, SD
12/09/2012*; 2:30 pm		Cal State Bakersfield	W 69–63	8–3	Frost Arena (886); Brookings, SD
12/15/2012*; 8:00 pm		at Montana	W 68–67 ^{2OT}	9–3	Dahlberg Arena (3,408); Missoula, MT
12/19/2012*; 7:00 pm		at Belmont	L 49–76	9–4	Curb Event Center (2,162); Nashville, TN
12/22/2012*; 1:30 pm		at No. 16 New Mexico	W 70–65	10–4	The Pit (15,278); Albuquerque, NM
12/29/2012; 7:00 pm		at North Dakota State	L 62–65	10–5 (1–1)	Bison Sports Arena (5,064); Fargo, ND
01/03/2013; 7:05 pm		at UMKC	W 77–61	11–5 (2–1)	Swinney Recreation Center (1,046); Kansas City, MO
01/05/2013; 4:05 pm		at South Dakota	L 71–74	11–6 (2–2)	DakotaDome (5,045); Vermillion, SD
01/10/2013; 7:00 pm		Oakland	W 81–74	12–6 (3–2)	Frost Arena (3,819); Brookings, SD
01/12/2013; 4:00 pm		IPFW	W 83–57	13–6 (4–2)	Frost Arena (3,335); Brookings, SD
01/17/2013; 7:00 pm		at Western Illinois	W 59–53	14–6 (5–2)	Western Hall (4,163); Macomb, IL
01/19/2013; 2:00 pm		at IUPUI	W 80–65	15–6 (6–2)	The Jungle (506); Indianapolis, IN
01/26/2013; 2:05 pm		North Dakota State	W 69–53	16–6 (7–2)	Frost Arena (6,063); Brookings, SD
01/31/2013; 7:05 pm		South Dakota	W 67–54	17–6 (8–2)	Frost Arena (6,130); Brookings, SD
02/02/2013; 4:05 pm		UMKC	W 88–57	18–6 (9–2)	Frost Arena (4,290); Brookings, SD
02/07/2013; 6:00 pm		at IPFW	W 80–74	19–6 (10–2)	Allen County War Memorial Coliseum (1,362); Fort Wayne, IN
02/09/2013; 4:00 pm		at Oakland	L 83–88	19–7 (10–3)	Athletics Center O'rena (2,965); Rochester, MI
02/14/2013; 7:05 pm		IUPUI	W 82–45	20–7 (11–3)	Frost Arena (2,834); Brookings, SD
02/16/2013; 4:05 pm		Western Illinois	W 64–55	21–7 (12–3)	Frost Arena (6,103); Brookings, SD
02/20/2013*; 9:00 pm		at Cal State Bakersfield	L 78–79 ^{2OT}	21–8	Rabobank Arena (1,005); Bakersfield, CA
02/23/2013*; 7:00 pm, ESPN2		Murray State; BracketBusters	L 62–73	21–9	CFSB Center (7,231); Murray, KY
02/28/2013; 7:00 pm		at Nebraska–Omaha	W 100–82	22–9 (13–3)	Ralston Arena (2,656); Ralston, NE
2013 The Summit League men's basketball tournament
03/09/2013; 6:00 pm, FCS Atlantic		vs. IUPUI; Quarterfinals	W 66–49	23–9	Sioux Falls Arena (6,704); Sioux Falls, SD
03/11/2013; 6:00 pm, FCS Atlantic		vs. IPFW; Semifinals	W 72–56	24–9	Sioux Falls Arena (6,676); Sioux Falls, SD
03/12/2013; 8:00 pm, ESPN2		vs. North Dakota State; Championship Game	W 73–67	25–9	Sioux Falls Arena (6,544); Sioux Falls, SD
2013 NCAA tournament
03/21/2013*; 6:15 pm, CBS	No. (13 S)	vs. No. 10 (4 S) Michigan; Second Round	L 56–71	25–10	The Palace of Auburn Hills; Auburn Hills, MI
*Non-conference game. ^{#}Rankings from AP Poll. (#) Tournament seedings in parentheses. All times are in Central Time. (#) during NCAA Tournament is seed with Region S=South.
