= 2012–13 UMKC Kangaroos men's basketball team =

American college basketball season

2012–13 UMKC Kangaroos men's basketball
- Conference: The Summit League
- Record: 8–24 (5–12 Summit)
- Head coach: Matt Brown (6th season)
- Assistant coaches: Stephen Brough (4th season); Doug Hall (1st season); Nate Johnson (1st season)
- Home arena: Swinney Recreation Center, Municipal Auditorium

2012–13 Summit League men's basketball standings
	Conf.				Overall
Team	W		L	PCT	W		L	PCT
South Dakota State †	13	–	3	.813	25	–	10	.714
Western Illinois	13	–	3	.813	22	–	9	.710
North Dakota State	12	–	4	.750	24	–	10	.706
Oakland	10	–	6	.625	16	–	17	.485
IPFW	7	–	9	.438	16	–	17	.485
Omaha *	6	–	10	.375	11	–	20	.355
UMKC	5	–	11	.313	8	–	24	.250
South Dakota	5	–	11	.313	10	–	20	.333
IUPUI	1	–	15	.063	6	–	26	.188
† 2013 Summit League Tournament winner Rankings from AP Poll * Ineligible for postseason due to program transition to NCAA Division I

The 2012–13 UMKC Kangaroos men's basketball team represented the University of Missouri–Kansas City during the 2012–13 NCAA Division I men's basketball season. The Kangaroos, led by sixth year head coach Matt Brown, played most of their home games on-campus at Swinney Recreation Center (with one game off-campus at Municipal Auditorium), in Kansas City, Missouri as a member of The Summit League.

They finished the season 8–24, 5–11 in The Summit League play to finish in a tie for seventh place. They were defeated in The Summit League tournament quarterfinal by North Dakota State University.

Following the conclusion of the schedule, the university terminated head coach Matt Brown. His overall record was 60–122, 29-73 in league play (four additional league and overall victories were vacated due to The Summit League sanctions, which would have left his final record at 64–122 (33–73)).

The season was UMKC's last as a member of The Summit League (for seven years; they would return in 2020) as they joined the Western Athletic Conference effective July, 2013.

== Previous season ==
The Kangaroos finished the 2011–12 season with a record of 12–18 overall, 6–12 in The Summit League to finish in eighth place.

== Roster ==
2012–13 UMKC Kangaroos men's basketball team
Players
Coaches

Pos.	#	Name	Height	Weight	Year	Previous school	Hometown
C	33	Brad Reid	6 ft 11 in (2.11 m)	250 lb (113 kg)	Sr	Roane State CC; Westminster Senior	Tantanoola, South Australia
G/F	13	Thomas Staton	6 ft 6 in (1.98 m)	225 lb (102 kg)	Sr	Independence CC/ Gardner–Webb; Clarkston HS	Southfield, MI
F/C	21	Fred Chatmon	6 ft 9 in (2.06 m)	230 lb (104 kg)	RS Jr	Garfield Heights HS	Cleveland, OH
F/C	44	Kirk Korver	6 ft 7 in (2.01 m)	220 lb (100 kg)	RS Jr	Pella HS	Pella, IA
G	0	Nate Rogers	6 ft 1 in (1.85 m)	195 lb (88 kg)	RS Jr	DePaul; St. Joseph HS	Maywood, IL
F	23	Trinity Hall	6 ft 7 in (2.01 m)	210 lb (95 kg)	Jr	Wyandotte HS	Kansas City, KS
F/C	31	Caleb Johnson	6 ft 9 in (2.06 m)	215 lb (98 kg)	Jr	Yuba; El Camino Fundamental HS	Sacramento, CA
G/F	1	Nelson Kirksey	6 ft 3 in (1.91 m)	195 lb (88 kg)	Jr	Jacksonville; Middle Creek HS	Pittsburgh, PA
G	12	Aaron Washington	6 ft 0 in (1.83 m)	165 lb (75 kg)	Jr	Johnson County CC; Blue Valley Northwest HS	Kansas City, KS
F	10	Alton Tanner	6 ft 8 in (2.03 m)	200 lb (91 kg)	So	Tyler JC; James E. Taylor HS	Houston, TX
G	11	Estan Tyler	6 ft 1 in (1.85 m)	175 lb (79 kg)	So	Johnson Senior HS	St. Paul, MN
G/F	5	Trevor Franklin	6 ft 6 in (1.98 m)	180 lb (82 kg)	RS Fr	Northeast HS	Oakland Park, FL
G	3	John Burke	6 ft 3 in (1.91 m)	205 lb (93 kg)	Fr	Hargrave Military/ North Springs HS	Atlanta, GA
G	4	Mason Wedel	6 ft 1 in (1.85 m)	180 lb (82 kg)	Fr	De Soto HS	Shawnee, KS

Head coach

- Matt Brown (Shippensburg)

Assistant coach(es)

- Stephen Brough (Miami (Ohio))
- Doug Hall (Wartburg)
- Nate Johnson (Florida State)

Legend

- (C) Team captain
- (S) Suspended
- (I) Ineligible
- (W) Walk-on
- (5Y) Fifth-year Senior
- Injured
- Current redshirt

Roster
Last update: November 3, 2024

== Schedule & Results ==
Date time, TV	Rank^{#}	Opponent^{#}	Result	Record	High points	High rebounds	High assists	Site (attendance) city, state
Exhibition Season
November 1, 2012*; 7:00 PM		Ottawa (Kansas)	W 88–56		19 – Rogers	7 – Reid, Korver	7 – Wedel	Swinney Recreation Center (884); Kansas City, MO
Regular Season
November 9, 2012*; 6:30 PM		at Seton Hall; Naismith Memorial Basketball; Hall-Of Fame; Tip*Off Tournament [Campus Site]	L 36–75	0–1	9 – Chatmon	8 – Chatmon	4 – Tyler	Walsh Gymnasium (2,600); South Orange, NJ
November 13, 2012*; 7:05 PM		Lincoln (Missouri)	W 99–64	1–1	17 – Korver	9 – Reid	6 – Tyler	Swinney Recreation Center (1,023); Kansas City, MO
November 17, 2012*; 1:30 PM		vs. Albany; Naismith Memorial Basketball; Hall-Of Fame; Tip*Off Tournament; Springfield Bracket [Semifinal]	L 59–62	1–2	17 – Tyler	8 – Chatmon	6 – Tyler	Mohegan Sun Arena (6,003); Uncasville, CT
November 18, 2012*; 10:30 AM		vs. Norfolk State; Naismith Memorial Basketball; Hall-Of Fame; Tip*Off Tournament; Springfield Bracket [Consolation Final]	W 63–57	2–2	15 – Tyler	5 – Chatmon, Hall	3 – Tyler	Mohegan Sun Arena; Uncasville, CT
November 9, 2012*; 5:00 PM, BTN		at No. 3 Ohio State; Naismith Memorial Basketball; Hall-Of Fame; Tip*Off Tournament [Campus Site]	L 45–91	2–3	7 – Staton, Tyler	4 – Hall, Kirksey	2 – Tyler	Value City Arena (17,478); Columbus, OH
November 29, 2012; 7:05 PM, KSMO–TV		IUPUI	W 79–65	3–3 (1–0)	20 – Chatmon	9 – Chatmon	3 – Tyler	Swinney Recreation Center (1,045); Kansas City, MO
December 1, 2012; 4:05 PM, KSMO–TV		Western Illinois	L 63–68	3–4 (1–1)	15 – Staton	5 – Chatmon	4 – Tyler	Swinney Recreation Center (893); Kansas City, MO
December 5, 2012*; 7:00 PM, MidCo SN		at North Dakota	W 73–70	4–4	16 – Rogers	13 – Chatmon	3 – Staton, Korver	Betty Engelstad Sioux Center (1,549); Grand Forks, ND
December 8, 2012*; 1:00 PM, ESPN3		at No. 5 Louisville	L 47–99	4–5	9 – Hall, Kirksey	6 – Kirksey	3 – Rogers	KFC Yum! Center (20,074); Louisville, KY
December 16, 2012*; 1:05 PM		Appalachian State	L 71–81	4–6	18 – Kirksey	3 – Chatmon, Kirksey	4 – Rogers	Swinney Recreation Center (779); Kansas City, MO
December 19, 2012*; 7:05 PM, KSMO–TV		Iowa State	L 61–76	4–7	17 – Tyler	7 – Chatmon	4 – Tyler	Municipal Auditorium (3,614); Kansas City, MO
December 22, 2012*; 12:05 PM, KSMO–TV		Southeast Missouri State	L 65–66	4–8	14 – Rogers	13 – Chatmon	9 – Tyler	Swinney Recreation Center (886); Kansas City, MO
December 29, 2012*; 6:00 PM, FSKC		at No. 25 Kansas State	L 44–52	4–9	13 – Staton	16 – Chatmon	4 – Tyler	Fred Bramlage Coliseum (12,528); Manhattan, KS
December 31, 2012; 5:00 PM		at Nebraska–Omaha	L 65–77	4–10 (1–2)	23 – Staton	8 – Chatmon	3 – Tyler	Ralston Arena (642); Ralston, NE
January 3, 2012; 7:05 PM, KSMO–TV		South Dakota State	L 61–77	4–11 (1–3)	14 – Staton	6 – Chatmon, Kirksey	5 – Staton	Swinney Recreation Center (1,046); Kansas City, MO
January 5, 2013; 5:15 PM, KSMO–TV		North Dakota State	L 44–63	4–12 (1–4)	10 – Tyler	5 – Chatmon	2 – Tyler	Swinney Recreation Center (1,118); Kansas City, MO
January 9, 2013*; 7:05 PM		Utah Valley	L 66–78	4–13	15 – Burke	6 – Reid, Chatmon	5 – Washington	Swinney Recreation Center (905); Kansas City, MO
January 12, 2013; 7:00 PM		at South Dakota	W 90–86	5–13 (2–4)	25 – Tyler	7 – Reid	5 – Tyler	DakotaDome (1,682); Vermillion, SD
January 17, 2013; 6:00 PM		at Oakland	L 68–81	5–14 (2–5)	20 – Tyler	4 – Chatmon, Rogers	4 – Staton	Athletics Center O'rena (2,345); Auburn Hills, MI
January 19, 2013; 6:00 PM		at IPFW	W 63–59	6–14 (3–5)	19 – Tyler	10 – Chatmon	2 – Staton, Rogers, Tyler	Allen County; War Memorial Coliseum (1,448); Fort Wayne, IN
January 22, 2013*; 7:05 PM, KSMO–TV		Houston Baptist	L 61–63	6–15	14 – Kirksey	17 – Chatmon	2 – Staton, Rogers, Tyler	Swinney Recreation Center (1,122); Kansas City, MO
January 26, 2013; 5:15 PM, KSMO–TV		Nebraska–Omaha	L 59–67	6–16 (3–6)	12 – Reid, Staton	13 – Reid	5 – Rogers	Swinney Recreation Center (1,236); Kansas City, MO
January 31, 2013; 7:00 PM		at North Dakota State	L 34–71	6–17 (3–7)	9 – Hall	6 – Reid	3 – Washington	Bison Sports Arena (1,741); Fargo, ND
February 2, 2013; 4:05 PM, FCS		at South Dakota State	L 57–88	6–18 (3–8)	13 – Tyler	10 – Reid, Hall	3 – Tyler	Frost Arena (4,290); Brookings, SD
February 6, 2013*; 7:05 PM, Legacy Sports Network		at Houston Baptist	L 45–66	6–19	13 – Hall	11 – Hall	3 – Rogers	Frank and Lucille; Sharp Gymnasium (591); Houston, TX
February 9, 2013; 5:15 PM, KSMO–TV		South Dakota	W 80–65	7–19 (4–8)	20 – Chatmon	7 – Chatmon, Tyler	6 – Tyler	Swinney Recreation Center (1,400); Kansas City, MO
February 14, 2013; 7:05 PM, KSMO–TV		IPFW	L 60–65	7–20 (4–9)	19 – Chatmon	10 – Chatmon	3 – Rogers	Swinney Recreation Center (879); Kansas City, MO
February 16, 2013; 6:15 PM, KSMO–TV/FCS		Oakland	L 74–86	7–21 (4–10)	18 – Kirksey	6 – Chatmon	4 – Tyler	Swinney Recreation Center (1,338); Kansas City, MO
February 23, 2013*; 7:00 PM		at Tennessee Tech; Ramada Worldwide BracketBuster	L 62–68	7–22	16 – Kirksey	10 – Chatmon	3 – Hall	Hooper Eblen Center (1,534); Cookeville, TN
February 28, 2013; 7:30 PM		at Western Illinois	L 50–53	7–23 (4–11)	17 – Tyler	5 – Wedel	4 – Wedel	Western Hall (2,191); Macomb, IL
March 2, 2013; 6:30 PM		at IUPUI	W 48–44	8–23 (5–11)	14 – Staton	6 – Korver, Kirksey	3 – Kirksey	IUPUI Gymnasium (819); Indianapolis, IN
League Tournament
March 10, 2013*; 8:30 PM, FCS Atlantic	(6)	vs. (3) North Dakota State [Quarterfinal]	L 58–69	8–24	14 – Hall	7 – Reid	7 – Tyler	Sioux Falls Arena (3,786); Sioux Falls, SD
*Non-conference game. ^{#}Rankings from AP Poll. (#) Tournament seedings in parentheses. All times are in Central Standard Time (CST).
