= 2012–13 IPFW Mastodons men's basketball team =

American college basketball season

2012–13 IPFW Mastodons men's basketball
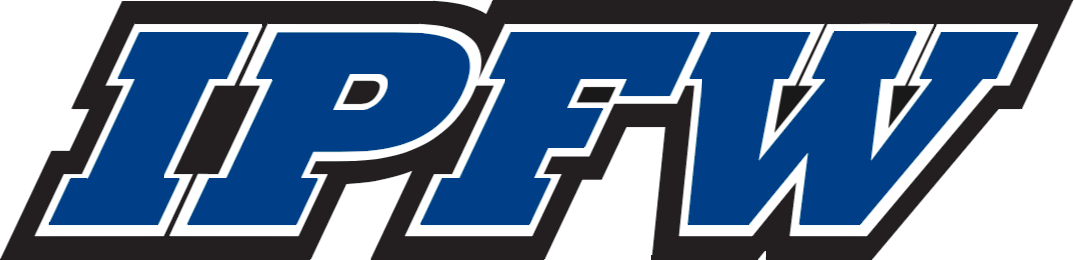
- Conference: The Summit League
- Record: 16–17 (7–9 The Summit)
- Head coach: Tony Jasick (2nd season)
- Assistant coaches: Jon Coffman; Dan Bere'; Azzez Ali
- Home arena: Allen County War Memorial Coliseum

2012–13 Summit League men's basketball standings
	Conf.				Overall
Team	W		L	PCT	W		L	PCT
South Dakota State †	13	–	3	.813	25	–	10	.714
Western Illinois	13	–	3	.813	22	–	9	.710
North Dakota State	12	–	4	.750	24	–	10	.706
Oakland	10	–	6	.625	16	–	17	.485
IPFW	7	–	9	.438	16	–	17	.485
Omaha *	6	–	10	.375	11	–	20	.355
UMKC	5	–	11	.313	8	–	24	.250
South Dakota	5	–	11	.313	10	–	20	.333
IUPUI	1	–	15	.063	6	–	26	.188
† 2013 Summit League Tournament winner Rankings from AP Poll * Ineligible for postseason due to program transition to NCAA Division I

The 2012–13 IPFW Mastodons men's basketball team represented Indiana University – Purdue University Fort Wayne during the 2012–13 NCAA Division I men's basketball season. The Mastodons, led by second year head coach Tony Jasick, played their home games at Allen County War Memorial Coliseum and were members of The Summit League. They finished the season 16–17, 7–9 in The Summit League play to finish in fifth place. They advanced to the semifinals of The Summit League tournament where they lost to South Dakota State.

== Roster ==
Number	Name	Position	Height	Weight	Year	Hometown
2	Pierre Bland	Guard	6–2	215	Junior	Jacksonville, Florida
3	Herbert Graham	Guard	6–4	180	Freshman	North Miami Beach, Florida
4	Frank Gaines	Guard	6–3	195	Senior	Fort Lauderdale, Florida
11	Isaiah McCray	Guard	6–0	175	Sophomore	Baltimore, Maryland
12	Justin Jordan	Guard	5–9	170	Junior	Fort Wayne, Indiana
13	Luis Jacobo	Forward	6–5	215	Junior	Sanford, Florida
15	Mario Hines	Forward	6–8	205	Senior	Cleveland, Ohio
20	Michael Kibiloski	Forward	6–7	215	Junior	Elkhart, Indiana
21	Michael Onuorah	Guard	6–2	190	Sophomore	Indianapolis, Indiana
23	Kevin Harden	Guard	6–2	180	Junior	Orlando, Florida
35	Will Dunn	Guard	6–2	185	Freshman	Edina, Minnesota
44	Joe Reed	Forward	6–7	205	Freshman	Greenwood, Indiana
50	Brent Calhoun	Forward	6–8	290	Freshman	Indianapolis, Indiana
53	Joe Edwards	Guard	6–4	190	Sophomore	Chicago, Illinois
54	Steve Forbes	Forward	6–9	320	Junior	Clermont, Florida

== Schedule ==
Date time, TV	Opponent	Result	Record	Site (attendance) city, state
Exhibition
11/05/2012*; 7:00 pm	Alma	W 71–43		Allen County War Memorial Coliseum; Fort Wayne, IN
Regular season
11/09/2012*; 8:00 pm	at Auburn	L 50–61	0–1	Auburn Arena (4,578); Auburn, AL
11/13/2012*; 8:00 pm	Rochester; EMU "Ice Man" Classic	W 73–56	1–1	Allen County War Memorial Coliseum (1,256); Fort Wayne, IN
11/16/2012*; 4:30 pm	vs. Texas–Pan American; EMU "Ice Man" Classic	W 97–94 ^{3OT}	2–1	Convocation Center (N/A); Ypsilanti, MI
11/17/2012*; 7:00 pm	at Eastern Michigan; EMU "Ice Man" Classic	L 47–60	2–2	Convocation Center (758); Ypsilanti, MI
11/18/2012*; 4:00 pm	vs. Eastern Illinois; EMU "Ice Man" Classic	L 67–68	2–3	Convocation Center (364); Ypsilanti, MI
11/20/2012*; 7:00 pm	Judson	W 92–22	3–3	Allen County War Memorial Coliseum (N/A); Fort Wayne, IN
11/24/2012*; 2:00 pm	at Dartmouth	W 70–66	4–3	Leede Arena (889); Hanover, NH
11/28/2012*; 7:00 pm	at Navy	L 49–54	4–4	Alumni Hall (998); Annapolis, MD
12/01/2012*; 7:00 pm	Miami (OH)	W 57–56	5–4	Allen County War Memorial Coliseum (3,033); Fort Wayne, IN
12/05/2012*; 7:00 pm	at Valparaiso	L 52–63	5–5	Athletics–Recreation Center (2,179); Valparaiso, IN
12/08/2012*; 8:05 pm	at Drake	L 64–74	5–6	Knapp Center (2,861); Des Moines, IA
12/17/2012*; 7:00 pm, ESPNU	at No. 22 Notre Dame	L 62–74	5–7	Edmund P. Joyce Center (6,755); South Bend, IN
12/21/2012*; 7:00 pm	Kennesaw State	W 70–47	6–7	Allen County War Memorial Coliseum (1,263); Fort Wayne, IN
12/27/2012; 7:00 pm	at IUPUI	L 74–88	6–8 (0–1)	Bankers Life Fieldhouse (1,327); Indianapolis, IN
12/29/2012; 8:00 pm	at Western Illinois	L 50–62	6–9 (0–2)	Western Hall (1,412); Macomb, IL
01/02/2013*; 7:00 pm	Navy	W 68–63	7–9	Allen County War Memorial Coliseum (1,411); Fort Wayne, IN
01/05/2013; 2:00 pm	Nebraska–Omaha	W 96–78	8–9 (1–2)	Allen County War Memorial Coliseum (1,387); Fort Wayne, IN
01/10/2013; 8:00 pm	at North Dakota State	L 55–67	8–10 (1–3)	Bison Sports Arena (2,690); Fargo, ND
01/12/2013; 5:00 pm	at South Dakota State	L 57–83	8–11 (1–4)	Frost Arena (3,335); Brookings, SD
01/17/2013; 7:00 pm	South Dakota	W 62–60	9–11 (2–4)	Allen County War Memorial Coliseum (1,337); Fort Wayne, IN
01/19/2013; 7:00 pm	UMKC	L 59–63	9–12 (2–5)	Allen County War Memorial Coliseum (1,448); Fort Wayne, IN
01/24/2013; 7:00 pm	Western Illinois	L 40–43	9–13 (2–6)	Allen County War Memorial Coliseum (1,094); Fort Wayne, IN
01/26/2013; 7:00 pm	IUPUI	W 80–79 ^{OT}	10–13 (3–6)	Allen County War Memorial Coliseum (1,156); Fort Wayne, IN
01/31/2013; 8:00 pm	at Nebraska–Omaha	L 79–86	10–14 (3–7)	Ralston Arena (1,088); Ralston, NE
02/07/2013; 7:00 pm	South Dakota State	L 74–80	10–15 (3–8)	Allen County War Memorial Coliseum (1,362); Fort Wayne, IN
02/09/2013; 7:00 pm	North Dakota State	L 54–58	10–16 (3–9)	Allen County War Memorial Coliseum (1,176); Fort Wayne, IN
02/14/2013; 8:05 pm	at UMKC	W 65–60	11–16 (4–9)	Swinney Recreation Center (879); Kansas City, MO
02/16/2013; 8:00 pm	at South Dakota	W 64–51	12–16 (5–9)	DakotaDome (1,815); Vermillion, SD
02/20/2013; 7:00 pm	Oakland	W 77–71	13–16 (6–9)	Allen County War Memorial Coliseum (1,493); Fort Wayne, IN
02/23/2013*; 7:00 pm	Bowling Green; BracketBusters	W 88–75	14–16	Allen County War Memorial Coliseum (1,577); Fort Wayne, IN
03/02/2013; 6:00 pm	at Oakland	W 74–72	15–16 (7–9)	Athletics Center O'rena (3,315); Rochester, MI
2013 The Summit League men's basketball tournament
03/10/2013; 7:00 pm, FCS Atlantic	vs. Oakland; Quarterfinals	W 91–72	16–16	Sioux Falls Arena (3,786); Sioux Falls, SD
03/11/2013; 7:00 pm, FCS Atlantic	vs. South Dakota State; Semifinals	L 56–72	16–17	Sioux Falls Arena (6,676); Sioux Falls, SD
*Non-conference game. ^{#}Rankings from AP Poll. (#) Tournament seedings in parentheses. All times are in Eastern Time.
