= 2012–13 IUPUI Jaguars men's basketball team =

American college basketball season

2012–13 IUPUI Jaguars men's basketball
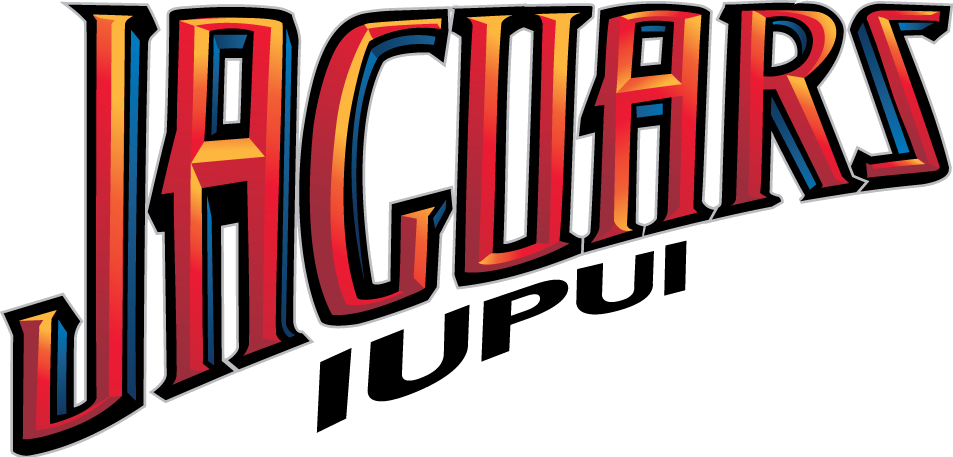
- Conference: The Summit League
- Record: 6–26 (1–15 The Summit)
- Head coach: Todd Howard
- Assistant coaches: Matt Crenshaw; David Padgett; Don Carlisle
- Home arena: The Jungle; Bankers Life Fieldhouse

2012–13 Summit League men's basketball standings
	Conf.				Overall
Team	W		L	PCT	W		L	PCT
South Dakota State †	13	–	3	.813	25	–	10	.714
Western Illinois	13	–	3	.813	22	–	9	.710
North Dakota State	12	–	4	.750	24	–	10	.706
Oakland	10	–	6	.625	16	–	17	.485
IPFW	7	–	9	.438	16	–	17	.485
Omaha *	6	–	10	.375	11	–	20	.355
UMKC	5	–	11	.313	8	–	24	.250
South Dakota	5	–	11	.313	10	–	20	.333
IUPUI	1	–	15	.063	6	–	26	.188
† 2013 Summit League Tournament winner Rankings from AP Poll * Ineligible for postseason due to program transition to NCAA Division I

The 2012–13 IUPUI Jaguars men's basketball team represented Indiana University – Purdue University Indianapolis during the 2012–13 NCAA Division I men's basketball season. The Jaguars, led by second-year head coach Todd Howard, played their home games at IUPUI Gymnasium (better known as The Jungle), with three games at Bankers Life Fieldhouse, and were members of The Summit League. They finished the season 6–26, 1–15 in The Summit League play to finish in last place. They lost in the quarterfinals of the Summit League tournament to South Dakota State.

== Roster ==
Number	Name	Position	Height	Weight	Year	Hometown
0	Cortell Busby	Guard	6–2	190	Freshman	Chester, South Carolina
1	Lyonell Gaines	Forward	6–6	217	Sophomore	Louisville, Kentucky
4	Ian Chiles	Guard	6–1	188	Junior	Louisville, Kentucky
5	Linwood Ross Jr.	Guard	6–5	185	Freshman	Miramar, Florida
10	Jordan Shanklin	Guard	6–0	183	Sophomore	Bowling Green, Kentucky
11	Cameron Loepker	Forward/center	6–9	275	Junior	Lafayette, Indiana
12	Greg Rice	Guard	5–11	188	Junior	Indianapolis, Indiana
13	Ja'Rob McCallum	Guard	6–0	170	Junior	Marion, Indiana
14	Elijah Ray	Forward	6–6	230	Freshman	Gary, Indiana
20	Sean Esposito	Guard	6–3	205	Senior	Indianapolis, Indiana
22	Marcellus Barksdale	Guard/forward	6–5	200	Sophomore	Lexington, Kentucky
23	P.J. Hubert	Guard	6–5	199	Junior	Greenfield, Indiana
24	Nick Kitcof	Guard/forward	6–7	191	Senior	Indianapolis, Indiana
25	John Hart	Guard	6–2	205	Senior	Beech Grove, Indiana
30	Donovan Gibbs	Forward	6–7	200	Junior	Louisville, Kentucky
42	Mitchell Patton	Forward/center	6–9	248	Junior	Vincennes, Indiana

== Schedule ==
Date time, TV	Opponent	Result	Record	Site (attendance) city, state
Exhibition
11/03/2012*; 12:00 pm	Trine	W 86–69		The Jungle; Indianapolis, IN
Regular season
11/09/2012*; 2:00 pm	Utah Valley	W 67–54	1–0	The Jungle (507); Indianapolis, IN
11/12/2012*; 9:00 pm, ESPNU	at No. 5 Michigan; NIT Season Tip-Off	L 54–91	1–1	Crisler Center (8,412); Ann Arbor, MI
11/13/2012*; 5:00 pm	vs. Bowling Green; NIT Season Tip-Off	W 80–66	2–1	Crisler Center (8,622); Ann Arbor, MI
11/17/2012*; 7:00 pm	Bradley	L 72–79	2–2	The Jungle (1,085); Indianapolis, IN
11/19/2012*; 4:30 pm	vs. North Texas; NIT Season Tip-Off	L 66–80	2–3	John Paul Jones Arena (1,444); Charlottesville, VA
11/20/2012*; 4:30 pm	vs. Lamar; NIT Season Tip-Off	L 82–86	2–4	John Paul Jones Arena (1,745); Charlottesville, VA
11/26/2012*; 7:00 pm	IU East	W 87–54	3–4	The Jungle (602); Indianapolis, IN
11/29/2012; 8:00 pm	at UMKC	L 65–79	3–5 (0–1)	Swinney Recreation Center (1,045); Kansas City, MO
12/01/2012; 8:00 pm	at South Dakota	L 68–88	3–6 (0–2)	DakotaDome (1,628); Vermillion, SD
12/05/2012*; 7:00 pm	at Butler	L 55–87	3–7	Hinkle Fieldhouse (5,533); Indianapolis, IN
12/08/2012*; 4:00 pm, ESPN3	at WKU	L 57–77	3–8	E. A. Diddle Arena (4,255); Bowling Green, KY
12/11/2012*; 7:00 pm	IU Northwest	W 65–59	4–8	The Jungle (450); Indianapolis, IN
12/15/2012*; 7:00 pm	Indiana State	L 61–75	4–9	The Jungle (1,215); Indianapolis, IN
12/20/2012*; 8:05 pm	at Valparaiso	L 69–89	4–10	Athletics–Recreation Center (1,644); Valparaiso, IN
12/23/2012*; 2:00 pm	at Ball State	W 77–68	5–10	John E. Worthen Arena (2,672); Muncie, IN
12/27/2012; 7:00 pm	IPFW	W 88–74	6–10 (1–2)	Bankers Life Fieldhouse (1,327); Indianapolis, IN
12/29/2012; 3:00 pm	Oakland	L 62–84	6–11 (1–3)	Bankers Life Fieldhouse (690); Indianapolis, IN
01/01/2013*; 3:00 pm, ESPN3	at Maryland	L 63–81	6–12	Comcast Center (8,971); College Park, MD
01/05/2013; 8:00 pm	at Western Illinois	L 53–57 ^{OT}	6–13 (1–4)	Western Hall (1,710); Macomb, IL
01/10/2013; 8:00 pm	at Nebraska–Omaha	L 79–90	6–14 (1–5)	Ralston Arena (916); Ralston, NE
01/17/2013; 7:00 pm	North Dakota State	L 40–78	6–15 (1–6)	Bankers Life Fieldhouse (1,312); Indianapolis, IN
01/19/2013; 3:00 pm	South Dakota State	L 65–80	6–16 (1–7)	The Jungle (506); Indianapolis, IN
01/24/2013; 7:00 pm	at Oakland	L 71–89	6–17 (1–8)	Athletics Center O'rena (2,215); Rochester, MI
01/26/2013; 7:00 pm	at IPFW	L 79–80 ^{OT}	6–18 (1–9)	Allen County War Memorial Coliseum (1,156); Fort Wayne, IN
02/02/2013; 3:00 pm	Western Illinois	L 59–68	6–19 (1–10)	The Jungle (772); Indianapolis, IN
02/09/2013; 3:00 pm	Nebraska–Omaha	L 78–85	6–20 (1–11)	The Jungle (683); Indianapolis, IN
02/14/2013; 8:05 pm	at South Dakota State	L 45–82	6–21 (1–12)	Frost Arena (2,834); Brookings, SD
02/16/2013; 8:00 pm	at North Dakota State	L 39–75	6–22 (1–13)	Bison Sports Arena (2,948); Fargo, ND
02/23/2013*; 3:00 pm	Milwaukee; BracketBusters	L 88–95 ^{2OT}	6–23	The Jungle (459); Indianapolis, IN
02/28/2013; 7:30 pm	South Dakota	L 69–87	6–24 (1–14)	The Jungle (639); Indianapolis, IN
03/02/2013; 7:30 pm	UMKC	L 44–48	6–25 (1–15)	The Jungle (819); Indianapolis, IN
2013 The Summit League men's basketball tournament
03/09/2013; 7:00 pm	vs. South Dakota State; Quarterfinals	L 49–66	6–26	Sioux Falls Arena; Sioux Falls, SD
*Non-conference game. ^{#}Rankings from AP Poll. (#) Tournament seedings in parentheses. All times are in Eastern Time.
