= Dave Boots =

American basketball coach

Biographical details
- Born: November 18, 1955 (age 70)

Playing career
- 1975–1979: Augsburg College

Coaching career (HC unless noted)
- 1981–1982: Anoka-Ramsey CC
- 1982–1988: Augsburg College
- 1988–2013: South Dakota

David W. Boots (born November 18, 1955) is an American retired basketball coach. He was the former head coach of the University of South Dakota men's basketball team. Boots played at Division III Augsburg College and later coached there. He was named head coach of South Dakota in 1988. Boots retired as head coach in September 2013. He finished as the winningest coach in school history with a record of 503–235.

== Head coaching record ==
Record table
Season	Team	Overall	Conference	Standing	Postseason
Anoka-Ramsey CC (Unknown) (1981–1982)
1981–82	Anoka-Ramsey CC	15–7			
Anoka-Ramsey CC:		15–7			
Augsburg College (Minnesota Intercollegiate Athletic Conference) (1982–1988)
1982–83	Augsburg College	18–8	14–4	1st	
1983–84	Augsburg College	19–7	17–3	1st	
1984–85	Augsburg College	21–7	18–2	1st	NCAA Division III Regional Fourth Place
1985–86	Augsburg College	18–8	14–6	4th	
1986–87	Augsburg College	13–12	11–9	T–3rd	
1987–88	Augsburg College	11–14	10–10	T–7th	
Augsburg College:		100–56 (.641)	84–34 (.712)		
South Dakota (North Central Conference) (1988–2008)
1988–89	South Dakota	17–15	9–9	5th	
1989–90	South Dakota	22–10	10–8	5th	NCAA Division II Regional Third Place
1990–91	South Dakota	20–10	9–9	T–5th	
1991–92	South Dakota	19–9	12–6	T–2nd	
1992–93	South Dakota	25–5	16–2	1st	NCAA Division II Elite Eight
1993–94	South Dakota	24–6	15–3	1st	NCAA Division II Elite Eight
1994–95	South Dakota	20–7	11–7	T–3rd	
1995–96	South Dakota	20–7	12–6	T–2nd	
1996–97	South Dakota	18–11	12–6	T–2nd	
1997–98	South Dakota	19–8	10–8	4th	
1998–99	South Dakota	23–6	14–4	1st	NCAA Division II Second Round
1999–00	South Dakota	22–6	13–5	1st	NCAA Division II Second Round
2000–01	South Dakota	22–6	14–4	1st	
2001–02	South Dakota	19–8	11–7	5th	
2002–03	South Dakota	19–9	8–8	T–5th	
2003–04	South Dakota	22–10	8–6	T–3rd	NCAA Division II Second Round
2004–05	South Dakota	27–6	8–4	2nd	NCAA Division II Sweet Sixteen
2005–06	South Dakota	20–10	7–5	3rd	NCAA Division II First Round
2006–07	South Dakota	23–7	10–2	T–1st	NCAA Division II First Round
2007–08	South Dakota	22–7	7–5	3rd	NCAA Division II First Round
South Dakota:			216–114 (.655)		
South Dakota (Independent) (2008–2009)
2008–09	South Dakota	20–9			
South Dakota (Great West Conference) (2008–2011)
2009–10	South Dakota	22–10	11–1	1st	CIT 1st Round
2010–11	South Dakota	18–15	7–5	4th	
South Dakota:			18–6 (.750)		
South Dakota (The Summit League) (2011–2013)
2011–12	South Dakota	10–18	5–13	T–8th	
2012–13	South Dakota	10–20	5–11	T–7th	
South Dakota:		503–235 (.682)	10–24 (.294)		
Total:		618–298 (.675)			
National champion Postseason invitational champion Conference regular season champion Conference regular season and conference tournament champion Division regular season champion Division regular season and conference tournament champion Conference tournament champion
