= 2013 College Basketball Invitational =

College basketball tournament

- Teams: 16
- Finals site: Leavey Center; Recreation and Athletic Complex; Patriot Center; Santa Clara, California; Fairfax, Virginia
- Champions: Santa Clara Broncos (1st title)
- Runner-up: George Mason Patriots (1st title game)
- Semifinalists: Wright State Raiders (1st semifinal); Western Michigan Broncos (1st semifinal)
- Winning coach: Kerry Keating (1st title)
- MVP: Kevin Foster (Santa Clara)

The 2013 College Basketball Invitational (CBI) was a single-elimination tournament of 16 National Collegiate Athletic Association (NCAA) Division I teams that did not participate in the NCAA Tournament or the NIT. The opening games were held on Tuesday, March 19. A best-of-three championship series between the final two teams was held on April 1, April 3, and April 5.

== Participants ==
North Dakota State and College of Charleston each had 24 wins going into this tournament, which is the most since Akron and IUPUI in 2009 (24 wins each). Texas and Purdue were teams invited despite having records under .500.

School	Conference	Entering record	Conference record
Bryant	Northeast	19–11	12–6
College of Charleston	Southern	24–10	14–4
George Mason	CAA	18–14	10–8
Houston	C-USA	19–12	7–9
Lehigh	Patriot	21–9	10–4
North Dakota State	Summit	24–9	12–4
Purdue	Big Ten	15–17	8–10
Richmond	Atlantic 10	18–14	8–8
Santa Clara	WCC	21–11	9–7
Texas	Big 12	16–17	7–11
Tulsa	C-USA	17–15	8–8
Vermont	America East	21–11	11–5
Western Illinois	Summit	22–8	13–3
Western Michigan	MAC	20–12	10–6
Wright State	Horizon	21–12	10–6
Wyoming	Mountain West	19–13	4–12

== Schedule ==
Game	Date	Time*	Matchup	Television
First round
1	March 19	7:00 pm	**George Mason** at College of Charleston	AXS TV
2	March 19	9:00 pm	Lehigh at **Wyoming**	AXS TV
3	March 19	10:00 pm	Vermont at **Santa Clara**	
4	March 20	7:00 pm	Western Illinois at **Purdue**	AXS TV
5	March 20	7:00 pm	North Dakota State at **Western Michigan**	
6	March 20	7:00 pm	Tulsa at **Wright State**	
7	March 20	7:00 pm	**Richmond** at Bryant	NEC TV, OSN
8	March 20	9:00 pm	Texas at **Houston**	AXS TV
Quarterfinals
9	March 25	7:00 pm	Houston at **George Mason**	AXS TV
10	March 25	7:00 pm	**Santa Clara** at Purdue	BTN Digital
11	March 25	7:00 pm	Richmond at **Wright State**	HLN
12	March 25	9:00 pm	**Western Michigan** at Wyoming	AXS TV
Semifinals
13	March 27	7:00 pm	Western Michigan at **George Mason**	AXS TV
14	March 27	9:00 pm	**Santa Clara** at Wright State	AXS TV
Finals
15	April 1	10:00 pm	George Mason at **Santa Clara**	AXS TV
16	April 3	7:00 pm	Santa Clara at **George Mason**	AXS TV
17	April 5	7:00 pm	**Santa Clara** at George Mason	AXS TV
All tipoff times in Eastern Time Zone. Winning team in **bold**.

== Bracket ==
First round March 19–20
North Dakota State	71
Western Michigan	72*
Lehigh	66
Wyoming	67
Texas	72
Houston	73
George Mason	78
College of Charleston	77
Vermont	67
Santa Clara	77
Western Illinois	67
Purdue	81
Richmond	76
Bryant	71
Tulsa	52
Wright State	72

Quarterfinals; March 25
Western Michigan	75*
Wyoming	67
Houston	84
George Mason	88*
Santa Clara	86
Purdue	83
Richmond	51
Wright State	57

Semifinals (Reseeded); March 27
Western Michigan	52
George Mason	62
Santa Clara	81
Wright State	69

Finals (Best of three); April 1, 3, 5
George Mason	73	73	77
Santa Clara	81	66	80

Home teams listed second.
* Denotes overtime period.
