= 2013 Summit League men's basketball tournament =

- Tournament logo
- Classification: Division I
- Season: 2012–13
- Teams: 8
- Site: Sioux Falls Arena; Sioux Falls, South Dakota
- Champions: South Dakota State (2nd title)
- Winning coach: Scott Nagy (2nd title)
- MVP: Nate Wolters (South Dakota State)
- Top scorer: Nate Wolters (South Dakota State) (65 points)
- Television: FCS Atlantic, Midco Sports Network, ESPN2

2012–13 Summit League men's basketball standings
	Conf.				Overall
Team	W		L	PCT	W		L	PCT
South Dakota State †	13	–	3	.813	25	–	10	.714
Western Illinois	13	–	3	.813	22	–	9	.710
North Dakota State	12	–	4	.750	24	–	10	.706
Oakland	10	–	6	.625	16	–	17	.485
IPFW	7	–	9	.438	16	–	17	.485
Omaha *	6	–	10	.375	11	–	20	.355
UMKC	5	–	11	.313	8	–	24	.250
South Dakota	5	–	11	.313	10	–	20	.333
IUPUI	1	–	15	.063	6	–	26	.188
† 2013 Summit League Tournament winner Rankings from AP Poll * Ineligible for postseason due to program transition to NCAA Division I

The 2013 Summit League men's basketball tournament was the 2013 post-season tournament for Summit League, an NCAA Division I athletic conference. The tournament took place March 9–12, 2013 at the Sioux Falls Arena in Sioux Falls, South Dakota. Only Nebraska–Omaha was ineligible for the 2013 tournament due to its NCAA Division I transition. Teams were seeded by conference record, with tiebreakers used when necessary.

== Tiebreaking procedure ==
The following rules define the tiebreaking procedure for The Summit League tournament. If there are multiple ties, the ties shall be broken in descending order. Once a tie is broken using the procedures below, it shall remain broken for purposes of all future comparisons. Tiebreaker procedures are used only to determine seeds for the league tournament.

=== Two-team tiebreaking criteria ===
The following criteria are applied to break ties between two teams:

1. Results of head-to-head competition between the two tied teams.
2. Comparison of each tied team's record against the team occupying the highest position in the standings continuing down through the standings until a team gains an advantage.
3. When arriving at another group of tied teams while comparing records, use each team's record against the collective tied teams as a group (prior to that group's own tie-breaking procedure) rather than the performance against individual tied teams.
4. If a tie still cannot be broken after applying criteria (1), (2) and (3), it will be broken by comparing each tied team's Ratings Percentage Index (RPI) (based upon the RPIratings.com Report issued on the morning following the last regular season league game).

=== Multiple-team tiebreaking criteria ===
The following criteria are applied to break ties between more than two teams:

1. Results of each tied team's collective record against the other teams tied for the same position.
2. If multiple ties still remain, then each tied team's record shall be compared to the team or group (if two or more are tied) occupying the highest position in the standings continuing down through the standings until a team gains an advantage.
3. If the above results in two teams remaining, the two-team tiebreaker is used.
4. If a tie involving three or more teams still cannot be broken after applying criteria (1) and (2), it will be broken by comparing each tied team's RPI (based upon the RPIratings.com Report issued on the morning following the last regular season league game).

== Bracket ==
Quarterfinals; March 9–10; FCS Atlantic/ Midco Sports Network
1	South Dakota State	66
8	IUPUI	49
4	Oakland	72
5	IPFW	91
2	Western Illinois	54
7	South Dakota	53
3	North Dakota State	69
6	UMKC	58

Semifinals; March 11; FCS Atlantic/ Midco Sports Network
1	South Dakota State	72
5	IPFW	56
2	Western Illinois	43
3	North Dakota State	55

Final; March 12; ESPN2
1	South Dakota State	73
3	North Dakota State	67
