= Ralston, Nebraska =

City in Douglas County, Nebraska, United States

- City
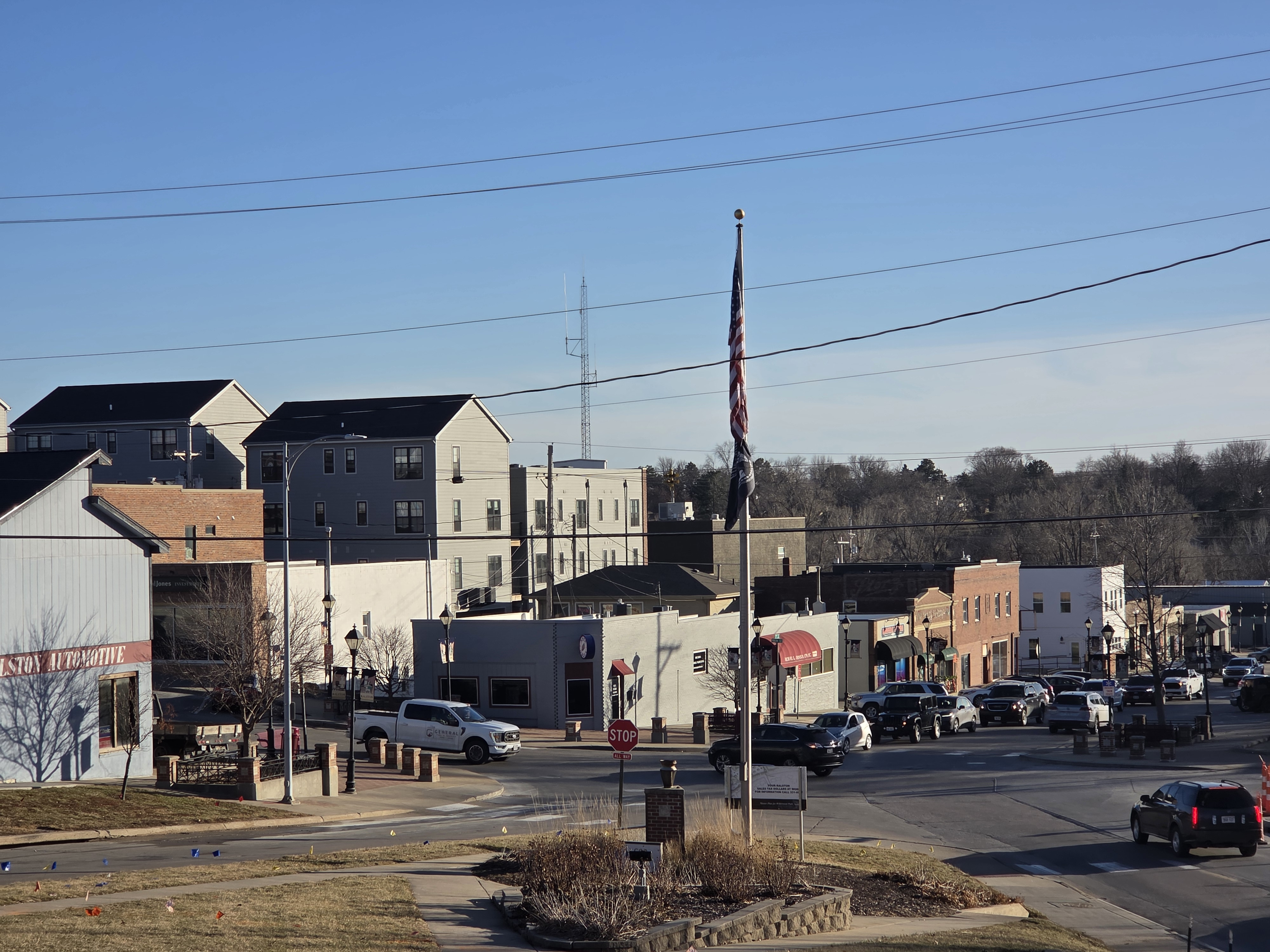
- 5-Point Intersection in Downtown Ralston

- City of Ralston Logo

- Location of Ralston within Nebraska and Douglas County
- Coordinates: 41°12′02″N 96°02′08″W
- Country: United States
- State: Nebraska
- County: Douglas

Government
  - Mayor: Donald A. Groesser

Area
  - Total: 1.60 sq mi (4.14 km^{2})
  - Land: 1.59 sq mi (4.11 km^{2})
  - Water: 0.012 sq mi (0.03 km^{2})
- Elevation: 1,093 ft (333 m)

Population (2020)
  - Total: 6,494
  - Estimate (2024): 6,443
  - Density: 4,090/sq mi (1,580/km^{2})
- Time zone: UTC-6 (Central (CST))
  - Summer (DST): UTC-5 (CDT)
- ZIP code: 68127
- Area codes: 402 and 531
- FIPS code: 31-40605
- GNIS feature ID: 2396309
- Website: https://cityofralston.com/

Ralston is a city in Douglas County, Nebraska, United States. The population was 6,494 at the 2020 census. A suburb of Omaha, Ralston is surrounded on three sides by the City of Omaha and by La Vista in Sarpy County on its south side.

== History ==
In the 1700s and 1800s, the Omaha and Oto-Missouria-Ioway were the primary Native American tribes along the Missouri River in what today is the State of Nebraska. Although there were no known Indigenous settlements within the boundaries of today's Ralston, the area was used as hunting grounds for regional tribes. After extensive political, economic, and social pressure, the Omahas signed the 1854 Treaty of Washington in which they ceded their lands in what is today eastern Nebraska to the US Government. The Omahas were then relocated to a reservation in Thurston County, Nebraska.

George and Hariette Miller are considered the founders of Ralston. George was a physician, politician, and founders of the Herald newspaper - the forerunner to the Omaha World Herald. In 1867, Dr. Miller purchased an initial 280 acres of land, purchasing another 350 acres over the next 2 decades. The Millers constructed a luxury, 17-room castle equipped with a hot water system located on what now is 75th and Oakwood Streets. The mansion was built out of stone shipped from Wisconsin that was originally was intended for a monastery. Dr. Miller, an Englishman dreamed of owning a country estate, thus acquired 40,000 walnut, catalpa, and oak trees from the Nebraska Territorial Secretary of Agriculture, Julius Sterling Morton, the Founder of Arbor Day. He then fenced in a portion of his ground and stocked it with deer and naming the estate Deerfield.

In 1882, he deeded the land to the land to School District #54 for $1.00 with its first school built in 1888, a one-room schoolhouse located on what now is Main Street and Park Drive. Ralston's first public school teacher was Mr. Moss Bates. In 1888, Dr. Miller surveyed sections of his land to be platted into lots and city streets, naming this area Seymour Park after his friend, an American politician, Horatio Seymour.

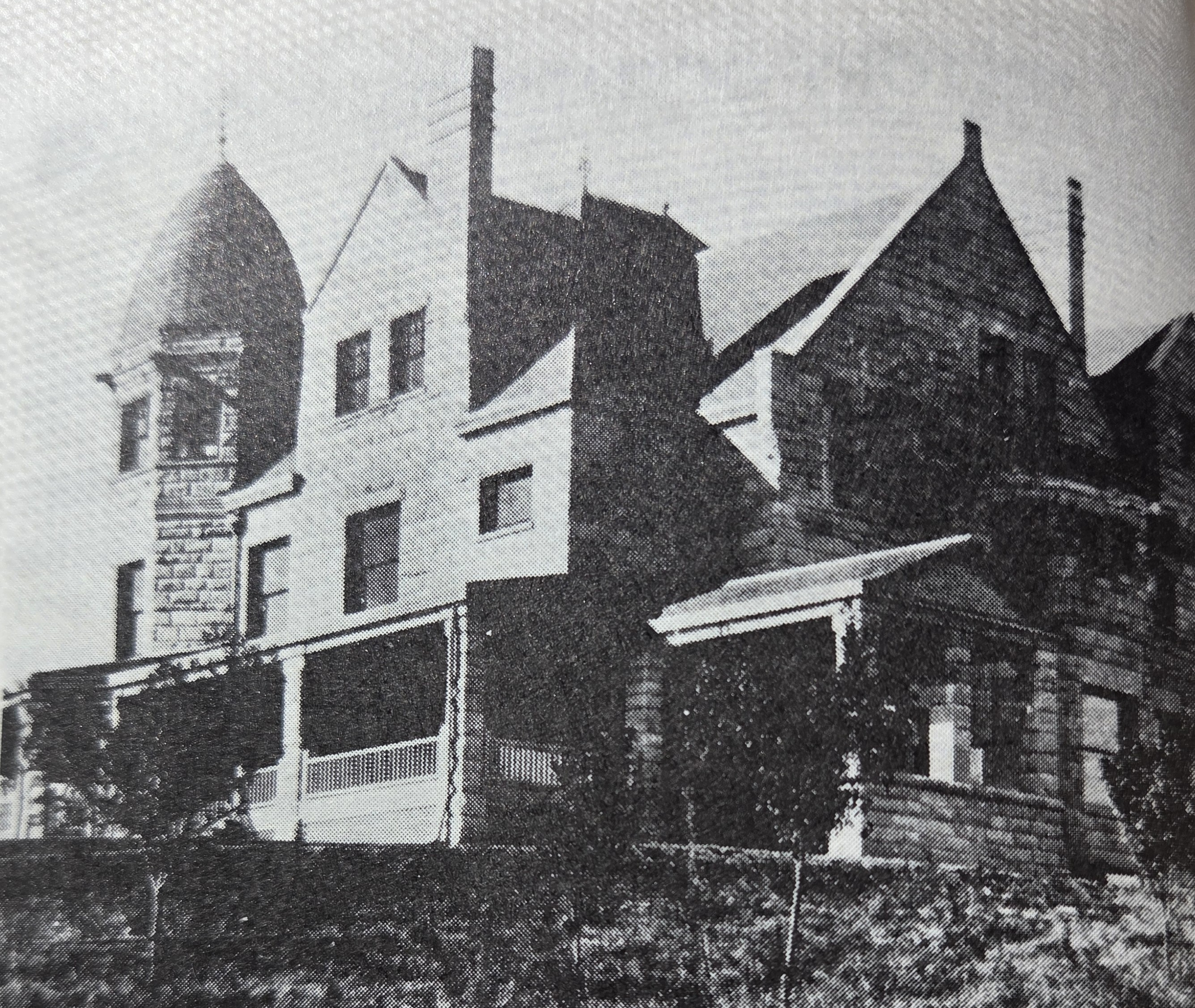
George and Hariette Miller Mansion, Ralston Nebraska. Burned Down in 1898.

In 1892, an accidental 47-acre lake was created around what is now 73rd and P Streets when a group of businessmen, exploring for oil or minerals, hit water at 1,440 feet. Water rushed up at thousands of gallons per hour, and a dike was hastily built to control flooding. The lake was named Seymour Lake and Cudahy Icehouse was established. The Missouri-Pacific Railroad built a spur to connect the icehouse and the plant to transfer ice during the winter.

The Chicago, Burlington, and Quincy Railroad Company built a rail line through Ralston in 1869, making travel to Chicago by rail possible. The rail line reached Denver in 1882, forming the first rail line to connect Denver and Chicago. Today, BNSF Railway Company still operates the rail line.

In the early 1900s, Ralston was connected to Omaha and Papillion through a network of streetcars. This network allowed farms to ship local produce to town markets and provided a way for workers to travel to their jobs in the South Omaha stockyards and meatpacking plants. The railway and streetcars allowed industry to boom during this time. Along Burlington Street, factories including Ralston Granary, Howard Stove Company, Ralston Lumber Company, Rogers Motor Company, Brown Truck Company, Liberty Laboratories, and Locomotive Cars and Contractors Equipment were built. Although many of these buildings are gone, United Seeds moved to Ralston from Omaha in the 1940s, repurposing the Brown Truck Company building, and the Granary, which closed shop in the 1950s and was at risk of being torn down, was renovated into a business center and entertainment venue in 2023.

The area of the townsite was established on May 23, 1907, with the sale of 282.7 acres (114.4 ha; 1,144,000 m^{2}) of land owned by Omaha newspaper editor George L. Miller to the Ralston Investment Company. A year later the town was platted by future Omaha mayor Roy N. Towl. A petition to incorporate the property as a village was submitted to the Douglas County Board of Commissions on June 22, 1912, which was adopted by the Board two days later on June 24.

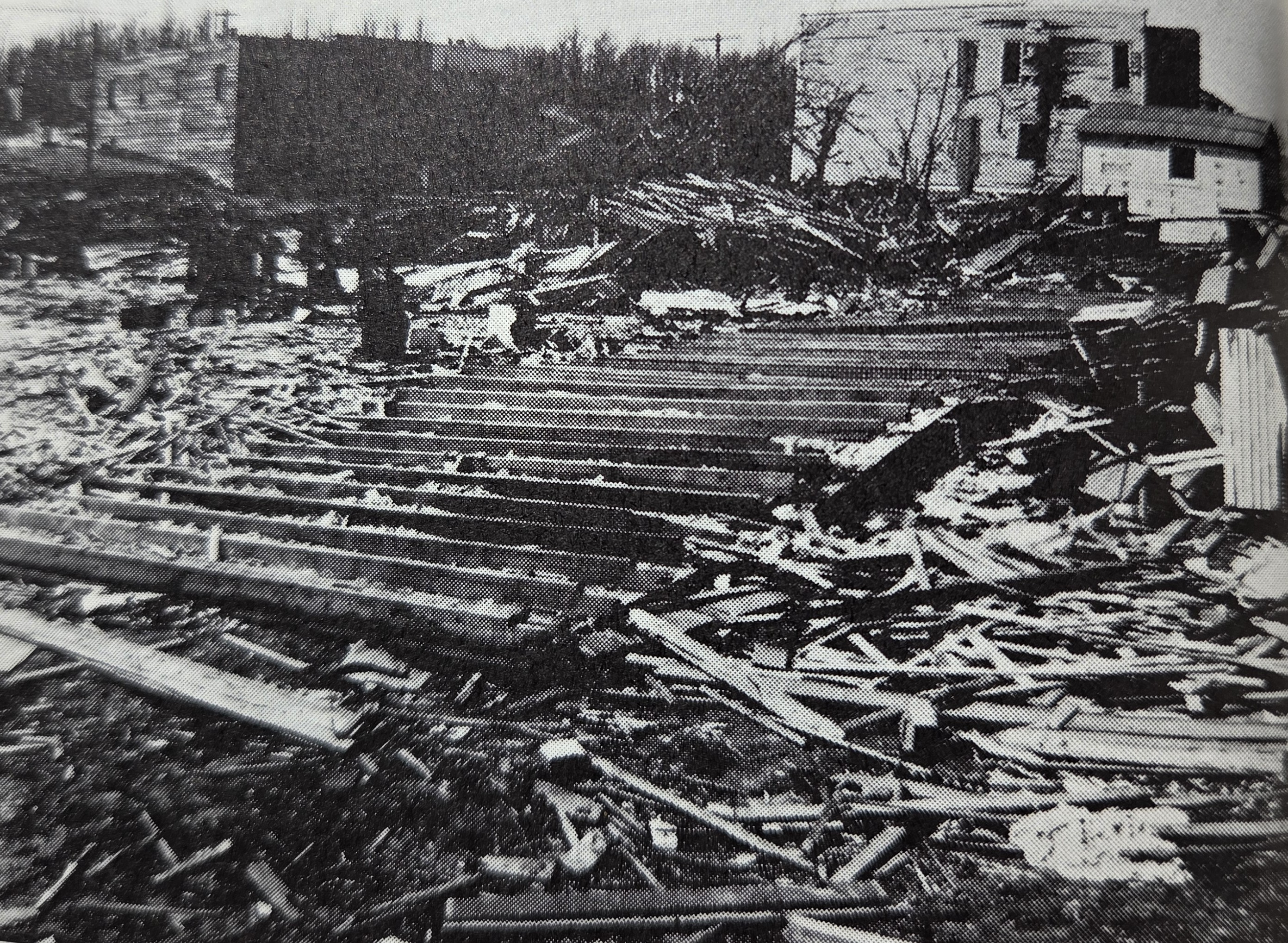
1913 Easter Tornado Outbreak, Downtown Ralston at 77th and Burlington Streets

The still nascent village experienced a devastating blow to its development on Easter, March 23, 1913, when a tornado tore through the downtown area, killing 10 residents and destroying a number of buildings and homes throughout downtown. The 1913 Easter Tornado was part of a March 1913 tornado outbreak sequence that ripped through the Southern and Midwestern regions of the United States. In the aftermath of the tornado, an individual by the name of Eugene Sigmund Schaefer, president of Rialto Realty Company, offered the City a deal in which the company would purchase 160 acres for $237,945, on which his company would make Ralston the film capital of the world. The City was to pay Schaefer in installments over two years. However, after the second installment of $50,000; Schaefer skipped town and disappeared, leaving the City to take up the quit claim deeds of 60 blocks of land sold to the Rialto Realty Company. Years later, Schaefer was caught and imprisoned in Philadelphia for swindling a woman out of $20,000 in jewelry, and having operated cons for decades under alias including Kruger, Whitman, and Lord Beaverbrook.

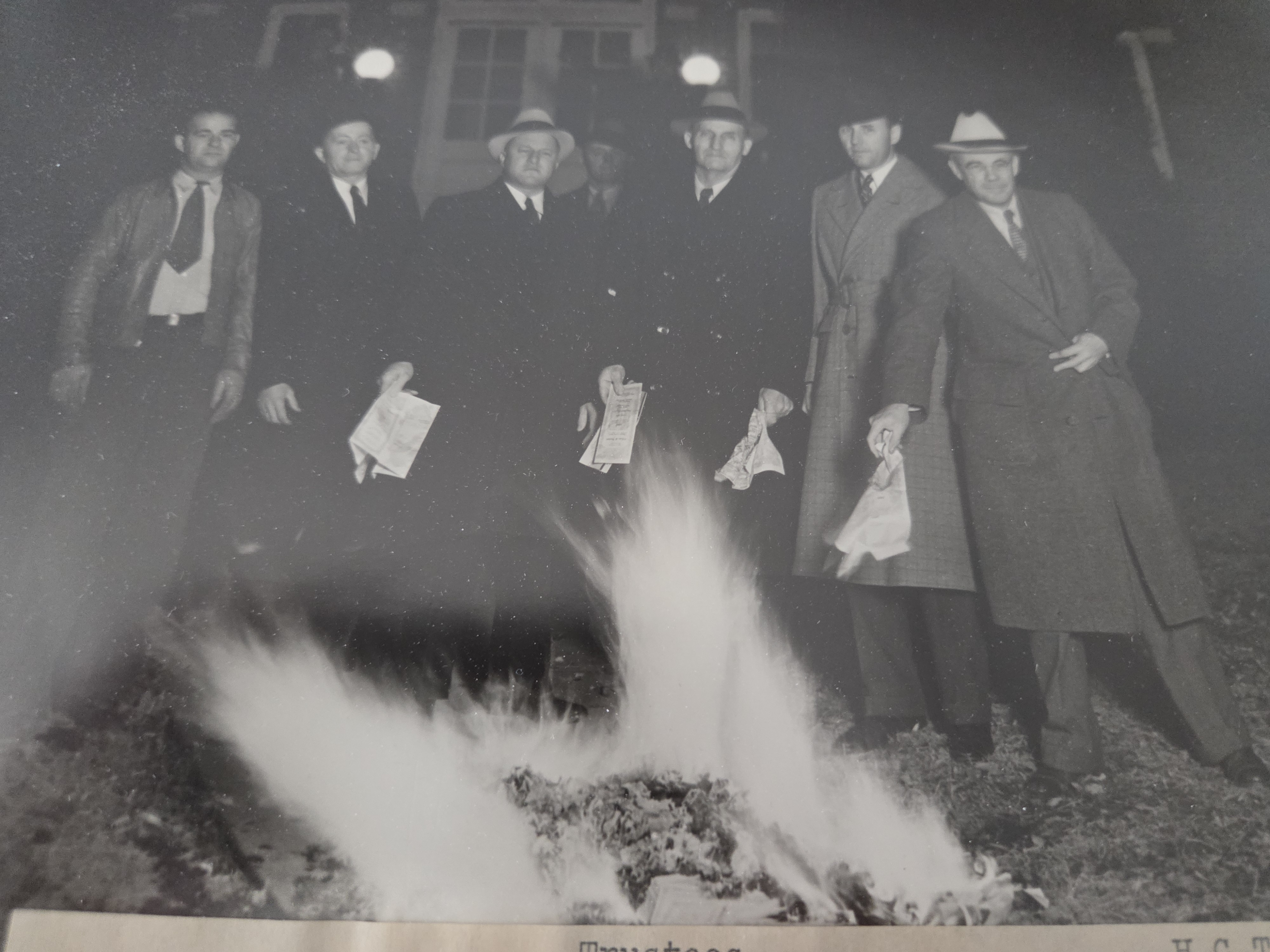
Mayor Tilford and the City Council burning the bonds after declaring bankruptcy in 1934.

One December 7, 1934, after years of financial distress following events including the 1913 tornado, the Rialto Company fallout, and the Great Depression; the City faced a financial disaster. Its bonded indebtedness reached a point where taxes became so high, it was crippling property owners. Finally, following a fire that destroyed half a city block, under Mayor H.C. Tilford, Ralston declared bankruptcy under the Uniform Act of Establishment of Bankruptcy; it was one of the first cities in the United States to do so. On November 5, 1935, the City's bonds totaling $240,000 were publicly burned in celebration. Ralston rebuilt itself starting in 1936 by giving away 678 lots to individuals for the purposes of building homes to generate tax revenue. Seymour Lake became a regional tourist destination once Ralston Country Club was established in 1937 and its club house was enjoyed until its demolition in 1948.

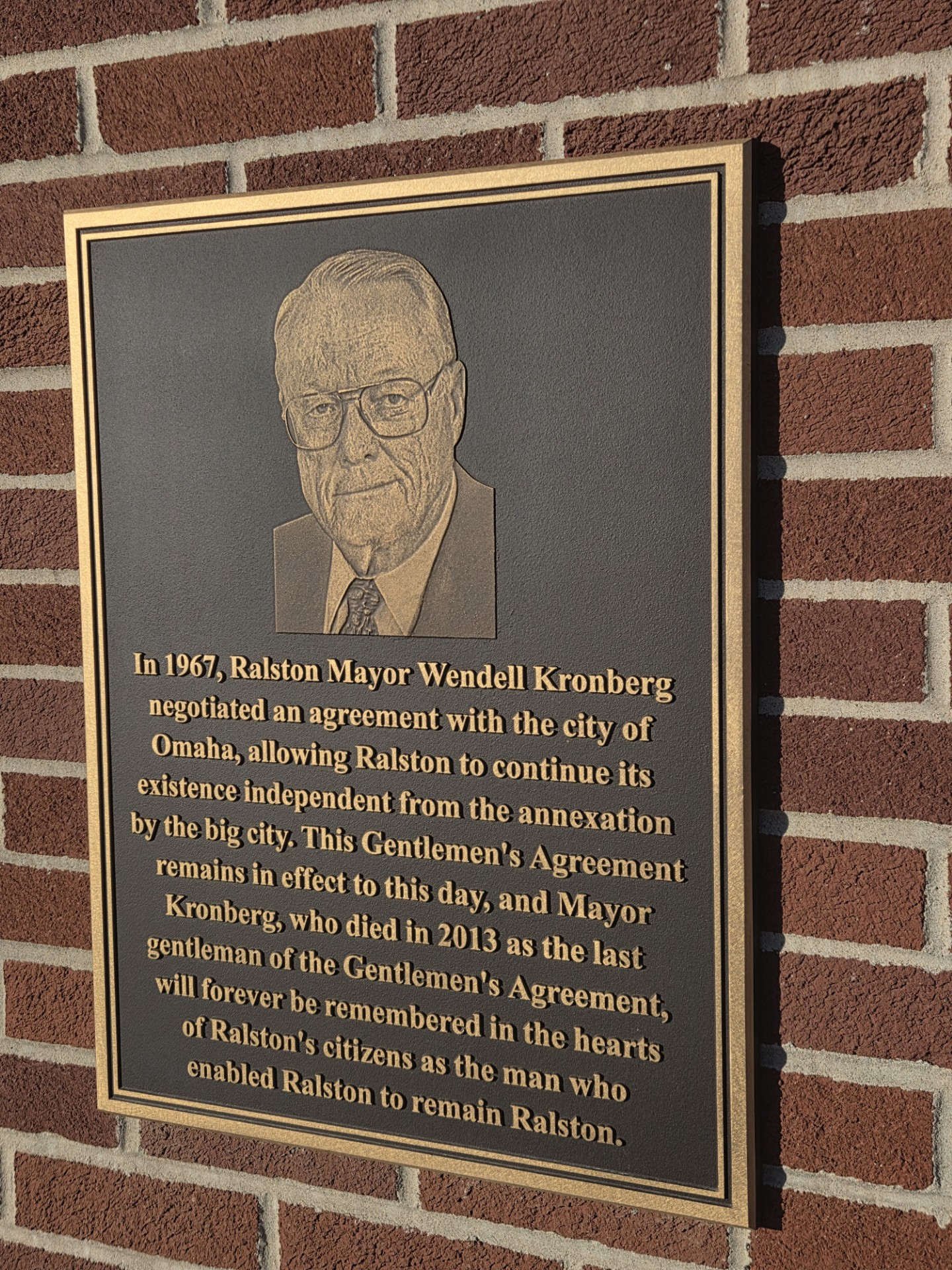
Ralston Non-Annexation Plaque on City Hall, Downtown Ralston, NE

In 1967, as Omaha was annexing towns and county land to its west, Ralston Mayor Wendell Kronberg negotiated a gentlemen's agreement with the City of Omaha where Ralston would be able to continue its existence without fear of annexation.

== Geography ==
Ralston is located at 41°12′8″N 96°2′14″W (41.202198, -96.037168).

According to the United States Census Bureau, the city has a total area of 1.65 square miles (4.27 km^{2}), of which 1.64 square miles (4.25 km^{2}) is land and 0.01 square miles (0.03 km^{2}) is water.

The nearest hospital is Bergan Mercy Hospital (3.7 miles) located in Omaha.

== Demographics ==
Historical population
| Census | Pop. | Note | %± |
|---|---|---|---|
| 1920 | 455 | | — |
| 1930 | 809 | | 77.8% |
| 1940 | 834 | | 3.1% |
| 1950 | 1,300 | | 55.9% |
| 1960 | 2,977 | | 129.0% |
| 1970 | 4,731 | | 58.9% |
| 1980 | 5,143 | | 8.7% |
| 1990 | 6,236 | | 21.3% |
| 2000 | 6,314 | | 1.3% |
| 2010 | 5,943 | | −5.9% |
| 2020 | 6,494 | | 9.3% |
| 2024 (est.) | 6,443 | | −0.8% |
U.S. Decennial Census; 2020 Census

=== 2020 census ===
As of the 2020 census, Ralston had a population of 6,494. The median age was 37.1 years. 20.7% of residents were under the age of 18 and 18.4% of residents were 65 years of age or older. For every 100 females there were 96.7 males, and for every 100 females age 18 and over there were 93.2 males age 18 and over.

100.0% of residents lived in urban areas, while 0.0% lived in rural areas.

There were 2,858 households in Ralston, of which 27.9% had children under the age of 18 living in them. Of all households, 41.0% were married-couple households, 20.8% were households with a male householder and no spouse or partner present, and 28.3% were households with a female householder and no spouse or partner present. About 32.3% of all households were made up of individuals and 13.1% had someone living alone who was 65 years of age or older.

There were 3,015 housing units, of which 5.2% were vacant. The homeowner vacancy rate was 0.9% and the rental vacancy rate was 8.7%.

Racial composition as of the 2020 census
| Race | Number | Percent |
|---|---|---|
| White | 5,108 | 78.7% |
| Black or African American | 242 | 3.7% |
| American Indian and Alaska Native | 59 | 0.9% |
| Asian | 113 | 1.7% |
| Native Hawaiian and Other Pacific Islander | 3 | 0.0% |
| Some other race | 402 | 6.2% |
| Two or more races | 567 | 8.7% |
| Hispanic or Latino (of any race) | 961 | 14.8% |

=== Income and poverty ===
The 2016–2020 5-year American Community Survey estimates show that the median household income was $60,106 (with a margin of error of ± $3,994) and the median family income $73,826 (± $7,307). Males had a median income of $41,763 (± $4,565) versus $34,464 (± $6,447) for females. The median income for those above 16 years old was $37,321 (± $4,055). Approximately, 4.4% of families and 8.3% of the population were below the poverty line, including 10.1% of those under the age of 18 and 4.0% of those ages 65 or over.

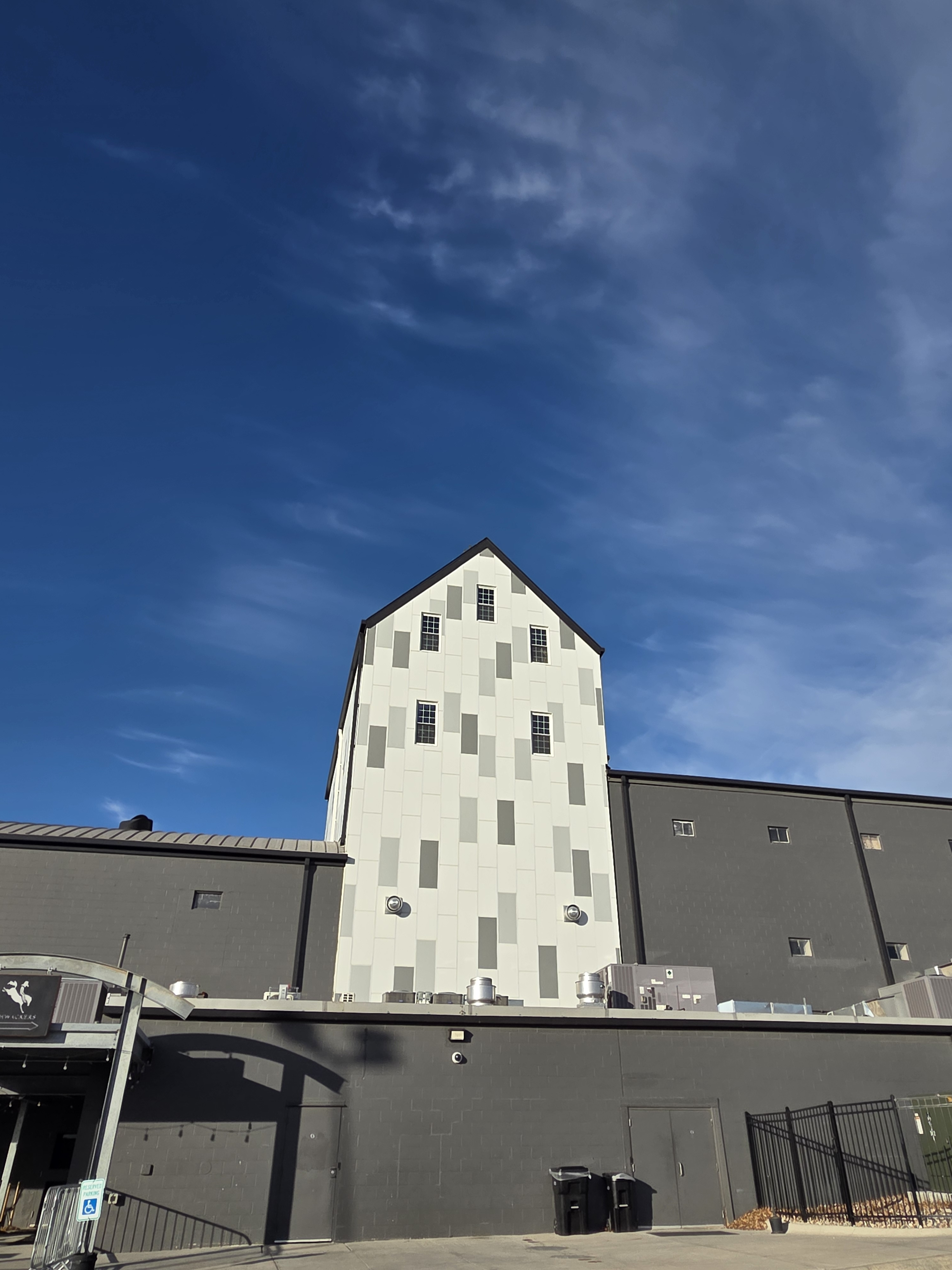
Ralston's Historic Granary, Built 1900 Renovated 2023

=== 2010 census ===
As of the 2010 census, the city had a total population of 5,943 people. There was a total of 2,581 households, of which 1,560 households were made of families. The population density was 3,623.8 inhabitants per square mile (1,399.2/km^{2}). There were 2,711 housing units. The racial makeup of the city was 89.7% White, 2.6% African American, 0.4% Native American, 0.8% Asian, 4.6% from other races, and 1.9% from two or more races. Hispanic or Latino of any race were 10.0% of the population.

There were 2,581 households, of which 27.6% had children under the age of 18 living with them, 45.6% were married couples living together, 10.8% had a female householder with no husband present, 4.0% had a male householder with no wife present, and 39.6% were non-families. 32.9% of all households were made up of individuals, and 13% had someone living alone who was 65 years of age or older. The average household size was 2.30 and the average family size was 2.94.

The median age in the city was 40 years. 22.2% of residents were under the age of 18; 8.7% were between the ages of 18 and 24; 25.1% were from 25 to 44; 27.7% were from 45 to 64; and 16.3% were 65 years of age or older. The gender makeup of the city was 49.1% male and 50.9% female.

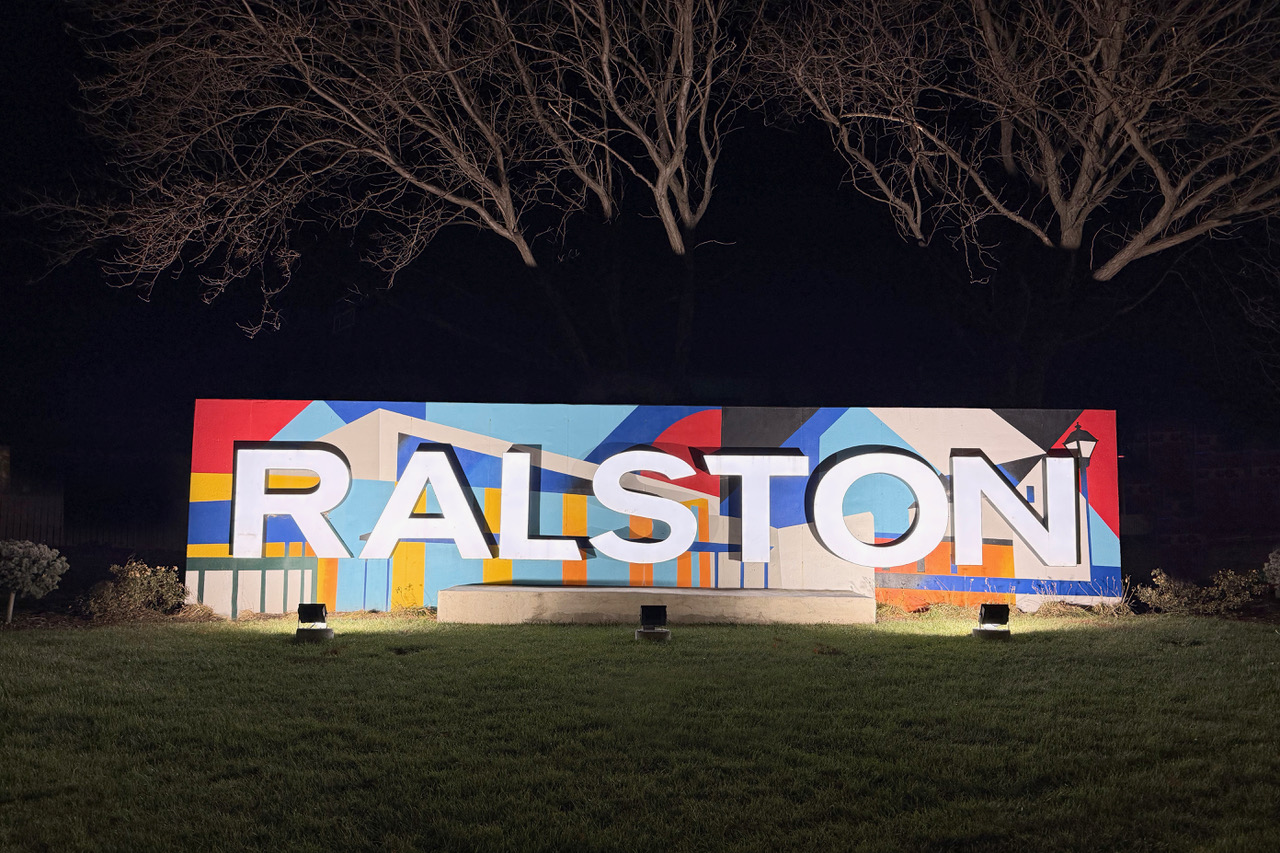
Ralston Welcome Sign on 72nd and Main Streets

=== 2000 census ===
As of the 2000 census, there were 6,314 people, 2,538 households, and 1,697 families residing in the city. The population density was 3,725.7 inhabitants per square mile (1,438.5/km^{2}). There were 2,601 housing units. The racial makeup of the city was 95.0% White, 1.24% African American, 0.2% Native American, 1.2% Asian, Pacific Islander, 1.6% from other races, and 0.9% from two or more races. Hispanic or Latino of any race were 4.4% of the population.

There were 2,538 households, out of which 32.5% had children under the age of 18 living with them, 53.8% were married couples living together, 9.1% had a female householder with no husband present, and 33.1% were non-families. 27.0% of all households were made up of individuals, and 7.5% had someone living alone who was 65 years of age or older. The average household size was 2.46 and the average family size was 3.00.

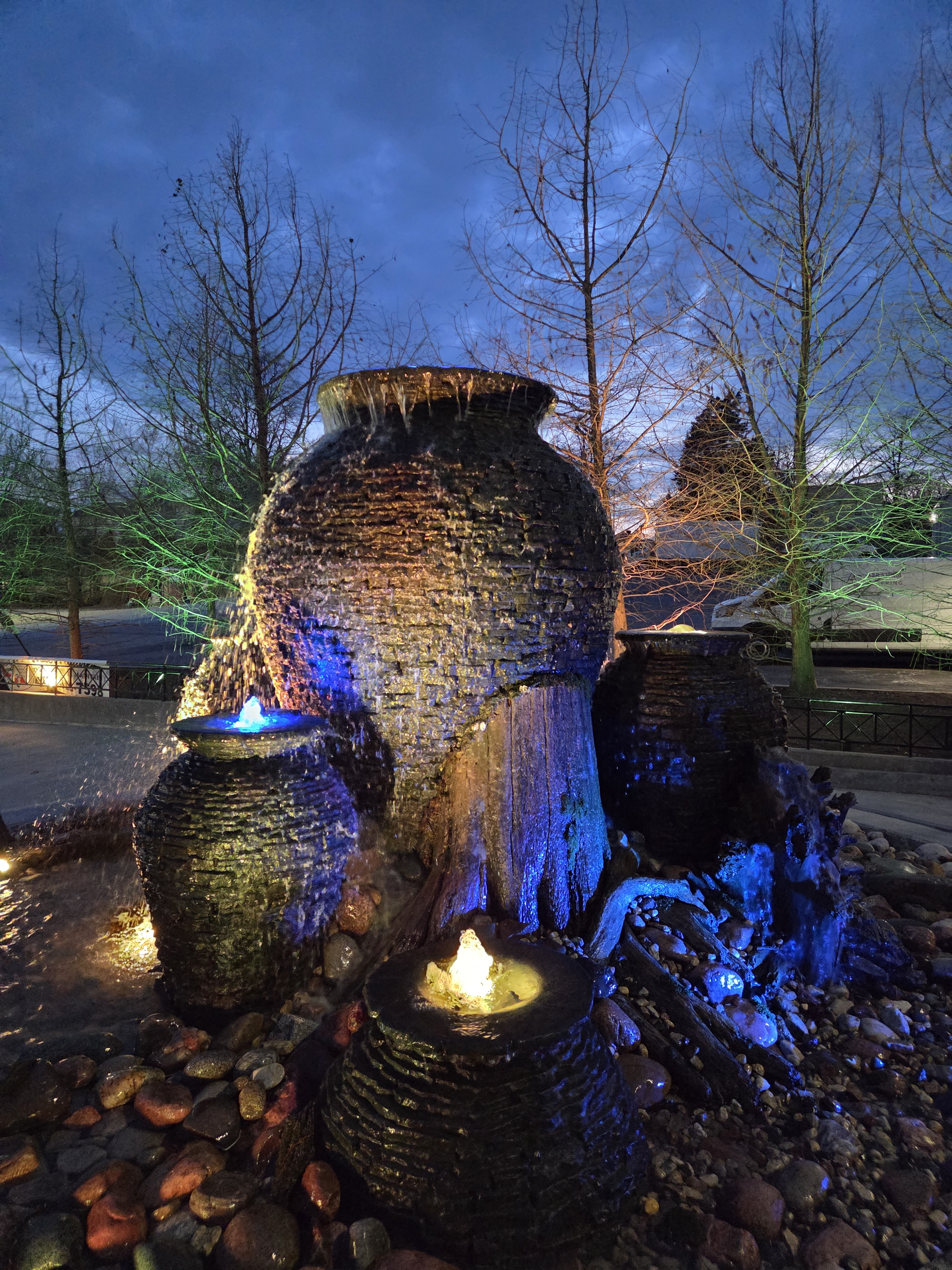
LaDonna Johnson Fountain at Independence Square

In the city, the population was spread out, with 24.6% under the age of 18, 8.6% from 18 to 24, 31.3% from 25 to 44, 24.1% from 45 to 64, and 11.4% who were 65 years of age or older. The median age was 36 years. For every 100 females, there were 98.2 males. For every 100 females age 18 and over, there were 95.1 males.

As of 2000 the median income for a household in the city was $47,252, and the median income for a family was $58,360. Males had a median income of $35,898 versus $27,475 for females. The per capita income for the city was $23,230. About 0.6% of families and 1.9% of the population were below the poverty line, including none of those under age 18 and 3.2% of those age 65 or over.

== Education ==
The local school district is Ralston Public Schools. The district serves about 3,400 students between kindergarten and 12th grade throughout Ralston and two sections of Omaha on Ralston's northeast and northwest corners.

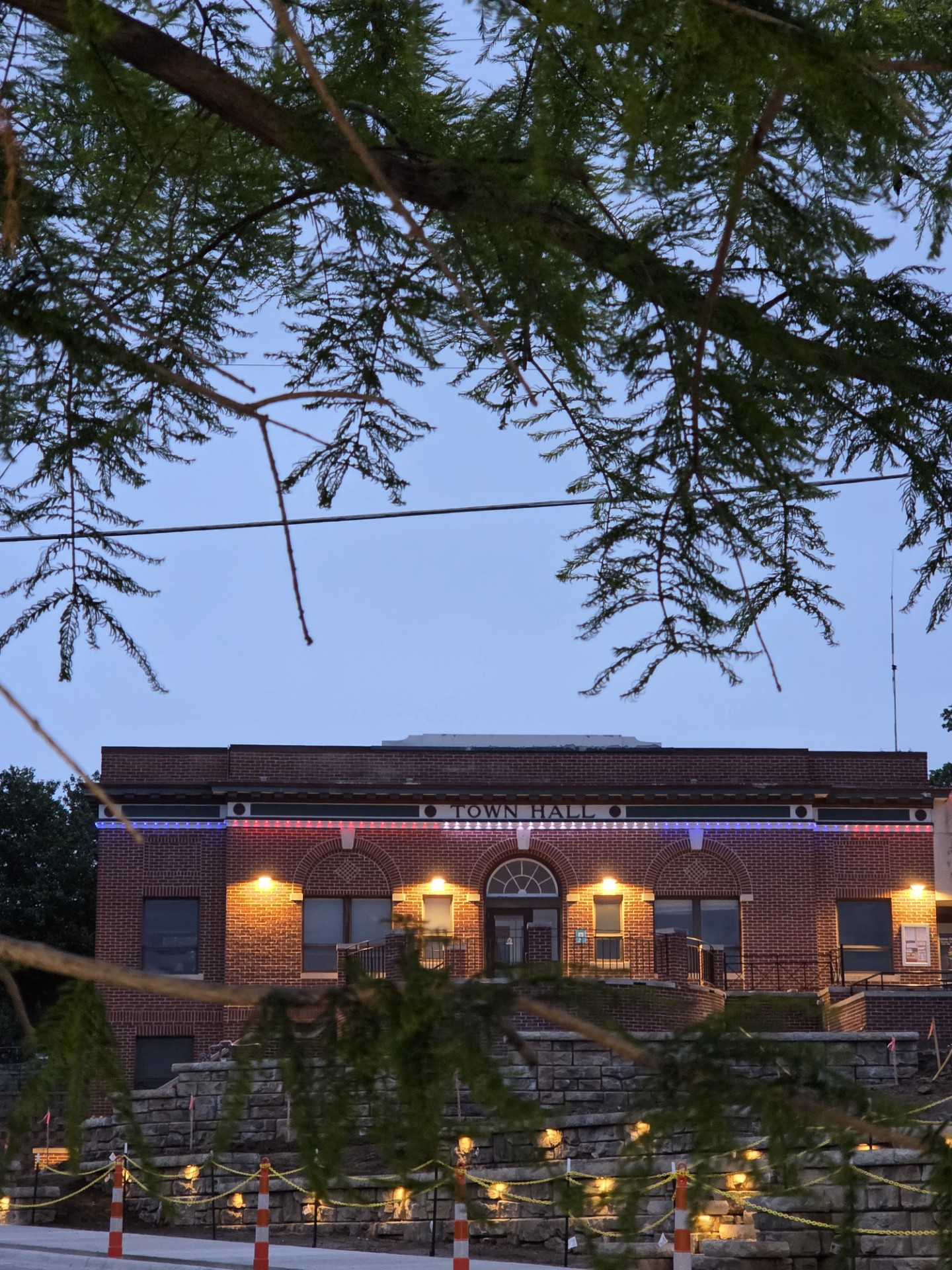
Ralston City Hall 2026

The Ralston Public Library has had four different homes throughout its lifetime. The library opened in 1922, located in the Stewart Real Estate Office. In 1924, it moved to the Centennial Room in the basement level of City Hall. In 1963, the library moved to 7900 Park Lane. In 1999, a new library was constructed across the street from City Hall. The library was also renamed the Baright Public Library after its last move.

== Attractions ==
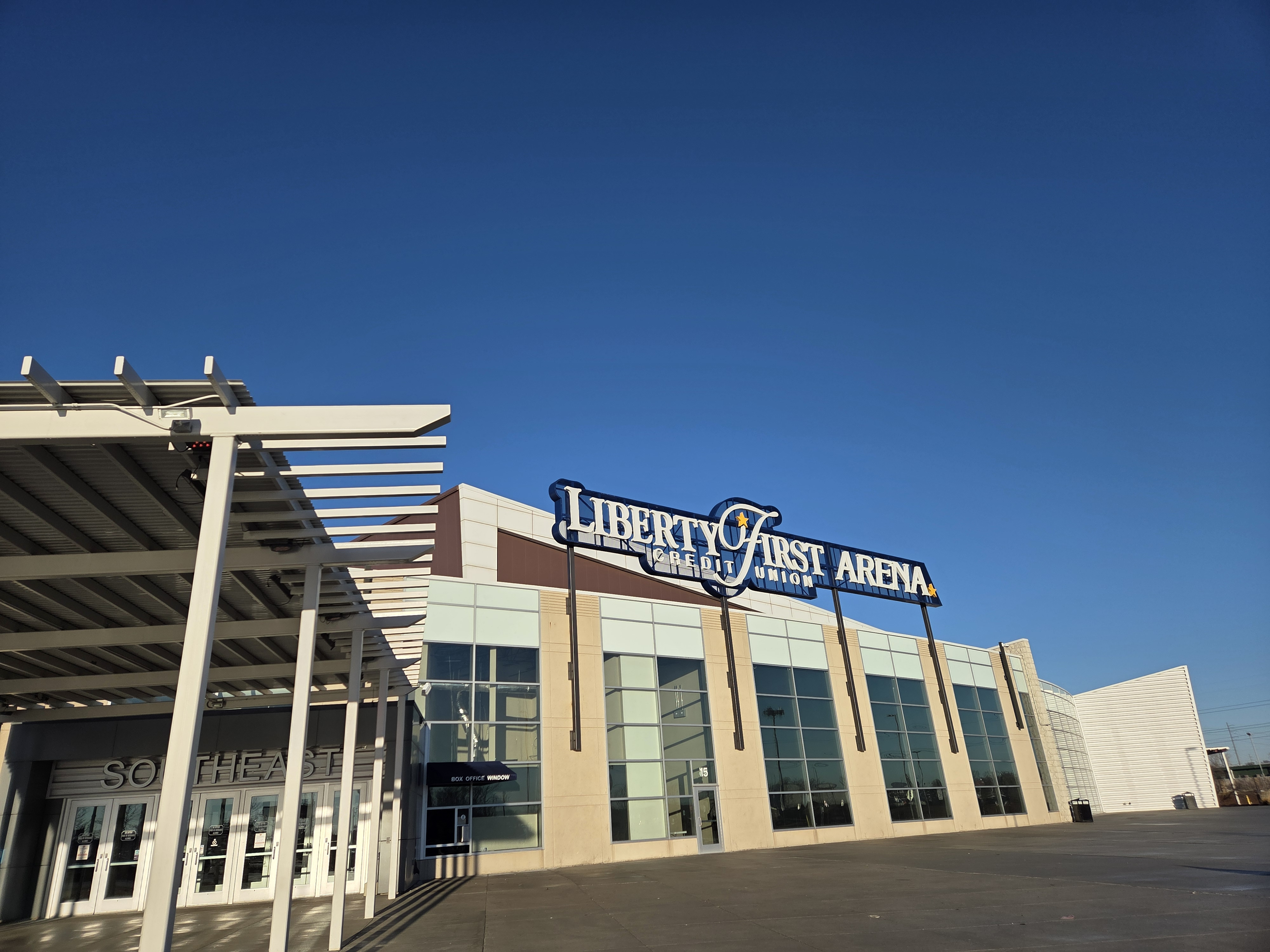
Liberty First Credit Union Arena in Ralston, NE

The Ralston Arena opened in 2012 and serves as the home of the Omaha Lancers hockey team and the Omaha Beef indoor football team. It previously served as the home of UNO Mavericks men's basketball team until Baxter Arena opened in 2015. In 2022, the arena's was officially renamed the Liberty First Credit Union Arena.

The Ralston HINGE Creative District was designated as an official Nebraska Creative District by the Nebraska Arts Council in 2024. The District sponsored the Recycled Letters Project; using the R-A-L-S-T-O-N letters from the arena, local artist Ilaamen Pelshaw designed the City's new welcome sign located at 72nd and Main Streets. The District also hosts events including the annual Heartland Plein Air Festival.

== Transportation ==
Transit service to the city is provided by Metro Transit.

== See also ==
- List of municipalities in Nebraska
