= DakotaDome =

Indoor football stadium at the University of South Dakota

- The Dome
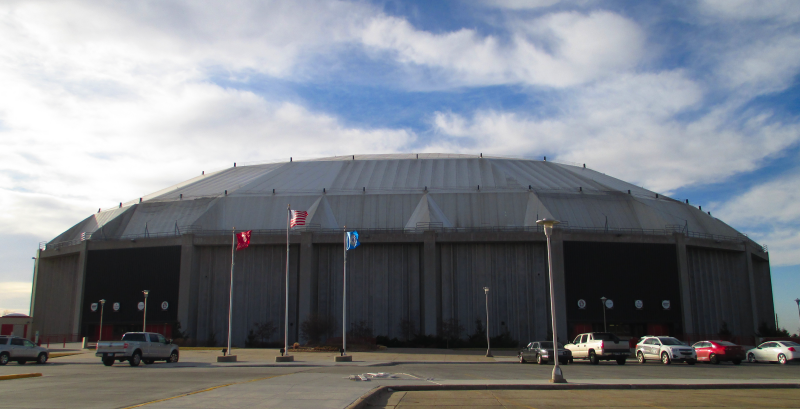
- View from east in 2012

- Location in the United States Location in South Dakota
- Interactive map of DakotaDome
- Address: 1101 N. Dakota Street
- Location: University of South Dakota; Vermillion, South Dakota, U.S.
- Coordinates: 42°47′28″N 96°55′40″W
- Elevation: 1,220 feet (370 m) AMSL
- Owner: University of South Dakota
- Operator: University of South Dakota
- Capacity: 9,100 (football)
- Surface: AstroTurf PureGrass (2012–present)

Construction
- Groundbreaking: 1976
- Opened: 1979; 47 years ago
- Renovated: 2001, 2011–2012, 2014–2016, 2019–2020
- Cost: $8.2 million ($36.4 million in 2025 dollars)
- Architects: Fritzel, Kroeger, Griffin & Berg
- Structural engineer: Geiger Berger Associates
- General contractors: Sharp Brothers Contracting (Kansas City, MO)

Tenants
- South Dakota Coyotes (NCAA) (1979–present); Football (1979–present); Men's basketball (1979–2016); Women's basketball (1979–2016); Swimming & diving (1979–2024); Volleyball (1979–2015); SDHSAA championship football games (1979–2019, 2021–present)); Briar Cliff Chargers football (NAIA) (2013–2017)

The DakotaDome is an indoor multi-purpose stadium in the north central United States, located on the campus of the University of South Dakota in Vermillion, South Dakota. Opened 47 years ago in 1979 at a cost of $8.2 million, the 9,100-seat venue is the home of the South Dakota Coyotes for football, swimming and diving, and track and field. The approximate elevation is 1,220 feet (370 m) above sea level.

For five seasons beginning in 2013, the DakotaDome also hosted Briar Cliff University football (NAIA); following the 2017 season, the Chargers resumed home games on their campus in Sioux City, Iowa, 25 miles (40 km) to the southeast.

The Dome hosts other events throughout the year, including the high school football state championships each November. In 2014, a proposal for a new basketball arena went through and construction began just south of the Dome. The new arena, the Sanford Coyote Sports Center, which seats 6,000, opened in the fall of 2016 for volleyball, preceding the 2016–17 basketball season.

Originally an air-supported structure, numerous roof collapses led to it being replaced by a $13.7 million steel roof in 2001. In early 2019, construction to rebuild the interior of the west side of the stadium began. The project cost was approximately $26.3 million and was completed in 2020.

== See also ==
- List of NCAA Division I FCS football stadiums
