= Purdue Fort Wayne Mastodons men's basketball =

College basketball team

2026–27 Purdue Fort Wayne Mastodons men's basketball team
- University: Purdue University Fort Wayne
- First season: 1973
- Head coach: Jon Coffman (12th season)
- Location: Fort Wayne, Indiana
- Arena: Hilliard Gates Sports Center (Capacity: 2,700); Allen County War Memorial Coliseum (Capacity: 13,000)
- Conference: Horizon League
- Nickname: Mastodons
- Colors: Black and gold
- Student section: The Herd

NCAA Division I tournament appearances
- 1993*

Conference regular-season champions
- Summit: 2016 Horizon: 2022

Uniforms
Home	Away
- * at Division II level

The Purdue Fort Wayne Mastodons men's basketball team is the intercollegiate men's basketball team that represents Purdue University Fort Wayne (PFW). They have been a member of the Horizon League since 2020 (departing from the Summit League after thirteen years). Formerly, they represented the now defunct Indiana University–Purdue University Fort Wayne (IPFW). The team has yet to participate in the NCAA Division I men's basketball tournament. The Mastodons are coached by Jon Coffman and play their home games at the Allen County War Memorial Coliseum in Fort Wayne, Indiana.

== History ==
The Mastodons' first season was 1973–74. Two-time All-American and conference player of the year Sean Gibson (1993) is the current all-time leading rebounder and Hall of Fame member. In 2013, Frank Gaines passed Gibson to be the Mastodons all-time leading scorer. Their first season in Division I was 2001–02. In 2007, the Mastadons joined the Summit League. Before joining NCAA Division I athletics, IPFW competed in NCAA Division II's Great Lakes Valley Conference.

In 2014, IPFW reach their first Summit League tournament championship before losing to North Dakota State.

Beginning in 2016, the school rebranded itself from IPFW to Fort Wayne to build a stronger tie to the Fort Wayne community. The transition only affected the athletic department's branding efforts. The university's IPFW academic brand remained unchanged.

On November 22, 2016, the Mastodons defeated the then No. 3-ranked Indiana Hoosiers 71–68 in overtime in front of 11,076 in attendance at Allen County War Memorial Coliseum. This defeat of Indiana was the Mastodons first victory over an AP Top 25 ranked team in program history.

== Conference affiliation ==
Years	Conference	Seasons
2020 to Present	Horizon League	3
2007–08 to 2019–2020	The Summit League	12
2001–02 to 2006–07	NCAA D-I Independent	6
1984–85 to 2000–01	Great Lakes Valley Conference	17
1981–82 to 1983–84	NCAA D-II Independent	3
1973–74 to 1980–81	NCAA D-III Independent	8

== Postseason ==
=== NCAA Division II Tournament results ===
The Mastodons have appeared in one NCAA Division II tournament. Their record is 0–2.

Year	Round	Opponent	Result
1993	Regional semifinals Regional 3rd-place game	Wayne State; Southern Indiana	L 72–78; L 93–95

=== NIT results ===
The Mastodons have appeared in one National Invitation Tournament (NIT). Their record is 0–1.

Year	Round	Opponent	Result
2016	First round	San Diego State	L 55–79

=== CBI results ===
The Mastodons have appeared in one College Basketball Invitational (CBI). Their combined record is 0–1.

Year	Seed	Round	Opponent	Result
2022	#16	First round	#1 Drake	L 65–87

=== CIT results ===
The Mastodons have appeared in five CollegeInsider.com Postseason Tournaments (CIT). Their combined record is 4–5, with an appearance in the championship of the CIT in 2024.

Year	Round	Opponent	Result
2014	First round Second Round	Akron; VMI	W 97–91; L 95–106
2015	First round	Evansville	L 77–82
2017	First round Quarterfinals	Ball State; Texas A&M–Corpus Christi	W 88–80; L 62–78
2018	First round	Central Michigan	L 89–94
2024	Quarterfinals; Semifinals; Championship Game	Bowling Green; Tarleton State; Norfolk State	W 77–75; W 73–72; L 67–75

== Division I season records ==
Record table
Season	Coach	Overall	Conference	Standing	Postseason
Doug Noll (Independent) (2001–2006)
2001–02	Doug Noll	7–21			
2002–03	Doug Noll	9–21			
2003–04	Doug Noll	3–25			
2004–05	Doug Noll (3–13); Joe Pechota (4–9)	7–22			
Doug Noll:		40–119 (.252)			
Dane Fife (Independent) (2005–2006)
2005–06	Dane Fife	10–18			
Dane Fife (United Basketball Conference) (2006–2007)
2006–07	Dane Fife	12–17	6–4	3rd	
Dane Fife (The Summit League) (2007–2011)
2007–08	Dane Fife	13–18	9–9	5th	
2008–09	Dane Fife	13–17	8–10	5th	
2009–10	Dane Fife	16–15	9–9	5th	
2010–11	Dane Fife	18–12	11–7	4th	
Dane Fife:		82–97 (.458)			
Tony Jasick (The Summit League) (2011–2014)
2011–12	Tony Jasick	11–19	5–13	T–8th	
2012–13	Tony Jasick	16–17	7–9	5th	
2013–14	Tony Jasick	25–11	10–4	T–2nd	CIT Second Round
Tony Jasick:		52–47 (.525)			
Jon Coffman (The Summit League) (2014–present)
2014–15	Jon Coffman	16–15	9–7	T–4th	CIT First round
2015–16	Jon Coffman	24–10	12–4	T–1st	NIT First round
2016–17	Jon Coffman	20–13	8–8	T–4th	CIT Second Round
2017–18	Jon Coffman	18–15	7–7	4th	CIT First round
2018–19	Jon Coffman	18–15	9–7	T–3rd	
2019–20	Jon Coffman	12–14	5–6	7th	
Jon Coffman (Horizon League) (2020–present)
2020–21	Jon Coffman	8–15	6–14	10th	
Jon Coffman:		98–82 (.544)	56–53		
Total:		258–315 (.450)			
National champion Postseason invitational champion Conference regular season champion Conference regular season and conference tournament champion Division regular season champion Division regular season and conference tournament champion Conference tournament champion
