= Jon Coffman =

American college basketball coach

Current position
- Title: Head coach
- Team: Purdue Fort Wayne
- Conference: Horizon League
- Record: 215–170 (.558)

Biographical details
- Born: July 28, 1973 (age 53)

Playing career
- 1992–1996: Washington and Lee
- Position: Point guard

Coaching career (HC unless noted)
- 1997–2000: Emory and Henry (assistant)
- 2000–2001: College of Charleston (assistant)
- 2001–2009: Stetson (assistant)
- 2009–2011: Colgate (assistant)
- 2011–2014: IPFW (assistant)
- 2014–present: IPFW/Fort Wayne/Purdue Fort Wayne

Head coaching record
- Overall: 215–170 (.558)
- Tournaments: 0–1 (NIT); 0–1 (CBI); 3–4 (CIT)

Accomplishments and honors

Championships
- Summit League regular season (2016); Horizon League regular season (2022)

Awards
- Summit League Coach of the Year (2016); Horizon League Coach of the Year (2022)

Jonathan Glenn Coffman (born July 28, 1973) is an American college basketball coach, currently men's head coach at Purdue University Fort Wayne. Coffman was hired as an assistant to head coach IPFW head coach Tony Jasick in 2011. When Jasick chose to leave for Jacksonville in 2014, Coffman was promoted to head coach. After earning a berth in the 2015 CollegeInsider.com Postseason Tournament in his first season, Coffman led the Mastodons to a share of the Summit League regular season championship in 2015–16 and was named the league's Coach of the Year.

== Head coaching record ==
Record table
Season	Team	Overall	Conference	Standing	Postseason
IPFW/Fort Wayne/Purdue Fort Wayne Mastodons (Summit League) (2014–2019)
2014–15	IPFW	16–15	9–7	T–4th	CIT First Round
2015–16	IPFW	24–10	12–4	T–1st	NIT First Round
2016–17	Fort Wayne	20–13	8–8	T–4th	CIT Quarterfinals
2017–18	Fort Wayne	18–15	7–7	4th	CIT First Round
2018–19	Purdue Fort Wayne	18–15	9–7	T–3rd	
2019–20	Purdue Fort Wayne	14–19	6–10	7th	
Purdue Fort Wayne Mastodons (Horizon League) (2020–present)
2020–21	Purdue Fort Wayne	8–15	6–14	11th	
2021–22	Purdue Fort Wayne	21–12	15–6	T–1st	CBI First Round
2022–23	Purdue Fort Wayne	17–15	9–11	T–8th	
2023–24	Purdue Fort Wayne	23–13	11–9	T–7th	CIT Runner-up
2024–25	Purdue Fort Wayne	19–13	12–8	5th	
2025–26	Purdue Fort Wayne	17–15	11–9	6th	
2026–27	Purdue Fort Wayne	0–0	0–0		
IPFW/Fort Wayne/Purdue Fort Wayne:		215–170 (.558)	115–100 (.535)		
Total:		215–170 (.558)			
National champion Postseason invitational champion Conference regular season champion Conference regular season and conference tournament champion Division regular season champion Division regular season and conference tournament champion Conference tournament champion
