= 2023–24 Coppin State Eagles men's basketball team =

American college basketball season

2023–24 Coppin State Eagles men's basketball
- Conference: Mid-Eastern Athletic Conference
- Record: 2–27 (1–13 MEAC)
- Head coach: Larry Stewart (1st season)
- Associate head coach: Sidney Raikes
- Assistant coach: Stephen Stewart
- Home arena: Physical Education Complex

2023–24 MEAC men's basketball standings
	Conf.				Overall
Team	W		L	PCT	W		L	PCT
Norfolk State	11	–	3	.786	24	–	11	.686
North Carolina Central	9	–	5	.643	18	–	13	.581
South Carolina State	9	–	5	.643	14	–	18	.438
Howard †	9	–	5	.643	18	–	17	.514
Morgan State	7	–	7	.500	11	–	20	.355
Delaware State	6	–	8	.429	15	–	19	.441
Maryland Eastern Shore	4	–	10	.286	9	–	20	.310
Coppin State	1	–	13	.071	2	–	27	.069
† 2024 MEAC tournament winner

The 2023–24 Coppin State Eagles men's basketball team represented Coppin State University (CSU) during the 2023-24 NCAA Division I men's basketball season. The Eagles, led by first-year head coach Larry Stewart, played their home games at the Physical Education Complex located in Baltimore, Maryland as members of the Mid-Eastern Athletic Conference (MEAC). They finished the season 2–27, 1–13 in MEAC play to finish in last place. They lost Norfolk State in the quarterfinals of the MEAC tournament.

== Previous season ==
The Eagles finished the 2022–23 season 9–23, 4–10 in MEAC play to finish in a tie for sixth place. They lost to Norfolk State in the quarterfinals of the MEAC tournament.

On March 21, 2023, the school fired head coach Juan Dixon. On May 5, the school named CSU alum and Maryland Eastern Shore assistant coach Larry Stewart the team's new head coach.

== Roster ==
2023–24 Coppin State Eagles men's basketball team
Players
Coaches

Pos.	#	Name	Height	Weight	Year	Previous school	Hometown
G	0	Malik Battle	6 ft 3 in (1.91 m)	170 lb (77 kg)	RS Sr	South Georgia Tech	Douglasville, GA
G	1	Daiquan Copeland	6 ft 6 in (1.98 m)	205 lb (93 kg)	Sr	Morgan State	Philadelphia, PA
G	2	Zahree Harrison	6 ft 0 in (1.83 m)	190 lb (86 kg)	RS Jr	Saint Francis (PA)	Philadelphia, PA
G	3	Aa'Reyon Jones	6 ft 3 in (1.91 m)	185 lb (84 kg)	Fr	Hillcrest High School	Chicago, IL
F	4	Khali Horton	6 ft 8 in (2.03 m)	200 lb (91 kg)	Fr	Keystone Academy	Erie, PA
G	5	Greg Spurlock	6 ft 5 in (1.96 m)	205 lb (93 kg)	Jr	Rock Ridge High School	Ashburn, VA
G	10	Ryan Archey	6 ft 0 in (1.83 m)	170 lb (77 kg)	Fr	Gwynn Park High School	Clinton, MD
G	11	Don Don Ferguson	6 ft 1 in (1.85 m)	165 lb (75 kg)	Fr	Technical Senior High School	St. Cloud, MN
G/F	13	Priest Ryan	6 ft 6 in (1.98 m)	205 lb (93 kg)	Fr	Perkiomen School	Pittsburgh, PA
F	20	Toto Fagbenle	6 ft 9 in (2.06 m)	220 lb (100 kg)	GS	Morgan State	London, England
C	22	Darryton Prescott	7 ft 0 in (2.13 m)	220 lb (100 kg)	RS Fr	Mathematics, Civics and Sciences Charter School	Philadelphia, PA
G	23	Camaren Sparrow	6 ft 4 in (1.93 m)	185 lb (84 kg)	Fr	New Town High School	Baltimore, MD
G	24	Ronnie Williams	6 ft 5 in (1.96 m)	200 lb (91 kg)	So	IMG Academy	Tampa, FL
G	25	Isaiah Gross	6 ft 4 in (1.93 m)	210 lb (95 kg)	RS Jr	Eleanor Roosevelt High School	Lanham, MD
F	33	Luka Tekavcic	6 ft 11 in (2.11 m)	210 lb (95 kg)	Jr	Oral Roberts	Grosuplje, Slovenia
F	35	Justin Winston	6 ft 8 in (2.03 m)	220 lb (100 kg)	RS Sr	Robert Morris	West Orange, NJ

Head coach

- Larry Stewart (Coppin State)

Assistant coach(es)

- Sidney Raikes (Coppin State)
- Stephen Stewart (Coppin State)

Legend

- (C) Team captain
- (S) Suspended
- (I) Ineligible
- (W) Walk-on
- Injured
- Current redshirt

Roster
Last update: November 14, 2023

== Schedule and results ==
Date time, TV	Rank^{#}	Opponent^{#}	Result	Record	Site (attendance) city, state
Non-conference regular season
November 6, 2023*; 8:00 p.m., ACCN		at Virginia Tech	L 55–100	0–1	Cassell Coliseum (8,925); Blacksburg, VA
November 9, 2023*; 8:00 p.m.		Towson	L 49–70	0–2	Physical Education Complex (1,106); Baltimore, MD
November 11, 2023*; 4:00 p.m., ESPN+		at Mount St. Mary's	L 60–74	0–3	Knott Arena (2,206); Emmitsburg, MD
November 15, 2023*; 7:00 p.m., ACCN		at Louisville	L 41–61	0–4	KFC Yum! Center (10,501); Louisville, KY
November 17, 2023*; 7:00 p.m., ESPN+		at Miami (OH); Miami Classic	L 48–76	0–5	Millett Hall (1,628); Oxford, OH
November 18, 2023*; 3:30 p.m.		vs. Eastern Illinois; Miami Classic	L 46–48	0–6	Millett Hall (357); Oxford, OH
November 26, 2023*; 1:00 p.m., ESPN+		at La Salle	L 62–81	0–7	Tom Gola Arena (1,473); Philadelphia, PA
November 30, 2023*; 7:00 p.m.		UMBC	W 89–70	1–7	Physical Education Complex (954); Baltimore, MD
December 3, 2023*; 1:30 p.m.		at Navy	L 52–75	1–8	Alumni Hall (950); Annapolis, MD
December 6, 2023*; 7:00 p.m.		Wagner	L 59–62	1–9	Physical Education Complex (532); Baltimore, MD
December 9, 2023*; 6:00 p.m.		at George Washington	L 45–76	1–10	Charles E. Smith Center (1,363); Washington, D.C.
December 12, 2023*; 8:30 p.m., FS1		at Georgetown	L 54–71	1–11	Capital One Arena (2,924); Washington, D.C.
December 19, 2023*; 7:00 p.m., ESPN+		at No. 20 James Madison	L 48–87	1–12	Atlantic Union Bank Center (3,214); Harrisonburg, VA
December 28, 2023*; 7:00 p.m., BTN		at Maryland	L 53–75	1–13	Xfinity Center (10,891); College Park, MD
MEAC regular season
January 6, 2024; 4:00 p.m.		at Delaware State	L 53–55	1–14 (0–1)	Memorial Hall (850); Dover, DE
January 8, 2024; 7:30 p.m.		Maryland Eastern Shore	W 58–55 ^{OT}	2–14 (1–1)	Physical Education Complex (403); Baltimore, MD
January 20, 2024; 4:00 p.m., ESPN+		Morgan State	L 86–89 ^{OT}	2–15 (1–2)	Physical Education Complex (736); Baltimore, MD
January 27, 2024; 4:00 p.m.		at Norfolk State	L 58–68	2–16 (1–3)	Joseph G. Echols Memorial Hall (2,567); Norfolk, VA
January 29, 2024; 7:30 p.m.		Howard	L 66–81	2–17 (1–4)	Physical Education Complex (612); Baltimore, MD
February 3, 2024; 4:00 pm		at North Carolina Central	L 46–77	2–18 (1–5)	McDougald–McLendon Arena (2,875); Durham, NC
February 5, 2024; 7:30 p.m.		at South Carolina State	L 65–77	2–19 (1–6)	SHM Memorial Center (580); Orangeburg, SC
February 17, 2024; 4:00 p.m.		Delaware State	L 56–66	2–20 (1–7)	Physical Education Complex (512); Baltimore, MD
February 19, 2024; 7:30 p.m.		at Maryland Eastern Shore	L 67–75	2–21 (1–8)	Hytche Athletic Center (183); Princess Anne, MD
February 24, 2024; 4:00 p.m.		Norfolk State	L 66–68	2–22 (1–9)	Physical Education Complex (2,100); Baltimore, MD
February 26, 2024; 7:30 p.m., ESPN+		at Howard	L 69–78	2–23 (1–10)	Burr Gymnasium (1,200); Washington, D.C.
March 2, 2024; 4:00 p.m.		North Carolina Central	L 58–83	2–24 (1–11)	Physical Education Complex (507); Baltimore, MD
March 4, 2024; 7:30 pm		South Carolina State	L 58–61	2–25 (1–12)	Physical Education Complex (450); Baltimore, MD
March 7, 2024; 7:30 p.m.		at Morgan State	L 60–78	2–26 (1–13)	Talmadge L. Hill Field House (4,159); Baltimore, MD
MEAC tournament
March 13, 2024; 6:00 p.m., ESPN+	(8)	vs. (1) Norfolk State; Quarterfinals	L 51–75	2–27	Norfolk Scope; Norfolk, VA
*Non-conference game. ^{#}Rankings from AP poll. (#) Tournament seedings in parentheses. All times are in Eastern.
