= 2024 MEAC men's basketball tournament =

US collegiate basketball tournament

- Classification: Division I
- Season: 2023–24
- Teams: 8
- Site: Norfolk Scope; Norfolk, Virginia
- Champions: Howard (4th title)
- Winning coach: Kenny Blakeney (2nd title)
- Television: ESPN+, ESPN2

2023–24 MEAC men's basketball standings
	Conf.				Overall
Team	W		L	PCT	W		L	PCT
Norfolk State	11	–	3	.786	24	–	11	.686
North Carolina Central	9	–	5	.643	18	–	13	.581
South Carolina State	9	–	5	.643	14	–	18	.438
Howard †	9	–	5	.643	18	–	17	.514
Morgan State	7	–	7	.500	11	–	20	.355
Delaware State	6	–	8	.429	15	–	19	.441
Maryland Eastern Shore	4	–	10	.286	9	–	20	.310
Coppin State	1	–	13	.071	2	–	27	.069
† 2024 MEAC tournament winner

The 2024 MEAC men's basketball tournament was the postseason men's basketball tournament for the 2023–24 season in the Mid-Eastern Athletic Conference (MEAC). The tournament took place during March 13–16, 2024. The tournament winner, Howard, received the conference's automatic invitation to the 2024 NCAA Division I men's basketball tournament.

== Seeds ==
All 8 teams were eligible for the tournament and were seeded by record within the conference, with a tiebreaker system to seed teams with identical conference records.

Seed	School	Conference	Tiebreaker
1	Norfolk State	11–3	
2	North Carolina Central	9–5	1–1 vs. Norfolk State
3	South Carolina State	9–5	+3 scoring margin against Howard
4	Howard	9–5	-3 scoring margin against South Carolina State
5	Morgan State	7–7	
6	Delaware State	6–8	
7	Maryland Eastern Shore	4–10	
8	Coppin State	1–13	

== Schedule ==
Game	Time*	Matchup^{#}	Score	Television
Quarterfinals – Wednesday, March 13
1	6:00 p.m.	No. 1 Norfolk State vs. No. 8 Coppin State	75–51	ESPN+
2	8:00 p.m.	No. 2 North Carolina Central vs. No. 7 Maryland Eastern Shore	87–81	ESPN+
Quarterfinals – Thursday, March 14
3	6:00 p.m.	No. 4 Howard vs. No. 5 Morgan State	78–65	ESPN+
4	8:00 p.m.	No. 3 South Carolina State vs. No. 6 Delaware State	58–71	ESPN+
Semifinals – Friday, March 15
5	6:00 p.m.	No. 1 Norfolk State vs. No. 4 Howard	74–80	ESPN+
6	8:00 p.m.	No. 2 North Carolina Central vs. No. 6 Delaware State	58–71	ESPN+
Championship – Saturday, March 16
7	1:00 p.m.	No. 4 Howard vs. No. 6 Delaware State	70–67	ESPN2
*Game times in ET. #-Rankings denote tournament seeding.

== Bracket ==
Quarterfinals; March 13–14; ESPN+
1	Norfolk State	75
8	Coppin State	51
4	Howard	78
5	Morgan State	65
2	North Carolina Central	87
7	Maryland Eastern Shore	81
3	South Carolina State	58
6	Delaware State	71

Semifinals; March 15; ESPN+
1	Norfolk State	74
4	Howard	80
2	North Carolina Central	58
6	Delaware State	71

Championship; March 16; ESPN2
4	Howard	70
6	Delaware State	67
