= 2023–24 Texas Southern Tigers basketball team =

American college basketball season

2023–24 Texas Southern Tigers basketball
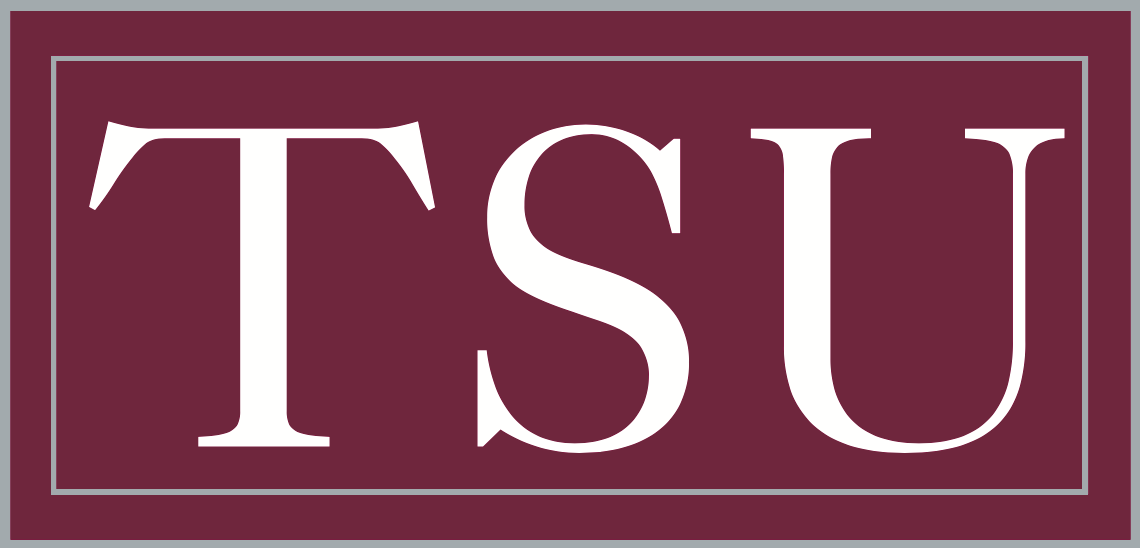

CIT, First Round
- Conference: Southwestern Athletic Conference
- Record: 16–17 (12–6 SWAC)
- Head coach: Johnny Jones (6th season)
- Assistant coaches: Shyrone Chatman; Josh White; Stacy Hollowell; John Jones
- Home arena: Health and Physical Education Arena

2023–24 SWAC men's basketball standings
	Conf.				Overall
Team	W		L	PCT	W		L	PCT
Grambling State †	14	–	4	.778	21	–	15	.583
Alcorn State	13	–	5	.722	14	–	18	.438
Texas Southern	12	–	6	.667	16	–	17	.485
Southern	12	–	6	.667	18	–	14	.563
Bethune–Cookman	11	–	7	.611	17	–	17	.500
Jackson State	11	–	7	.611	15	–	17	.469
Alabama A&M	9	–	9	.500	12	–	23	.343
Alabama State	8	–	10	.444	13	–	19	.406
Arkansas–Pine Bluff	8	–	10	.444	13	–	18	.419
Prairie View A&M	5	–	13	.278	10	–	21	.323
Florida A&M	4	–	14	.222	6	–	23	.207
Mississippi Valley State	1	–	17	.056	1	–	30	.032
† 2024 SWAC tournament winner

The 2023–24 Texas Southern Tigers basketball team represented Texas Southern University during the 2023–24 NCAA Division I men's basketball season. The Tigers, led by sixth-year head coach Johnny Jones, play their home games at the Health and Physical Education Arena located in Houston, Texas, as members of the Southwestern Athletic Conference. They finished the season 16–17, 12–6 in SWAC play to finish in a tie for third place. As the No. 3 seed in the SWAC Tournament, they defeated Jackson State in the quarterfinals, and Alabama A&M in the semifinals, before losing to Grambling State in the championship. They received an invitation to the CIT, where they lost to Tarleton in the first round.

== Previous season ==
The Tigers finished the 2022–23 season 14–20, 7–11, in SWAC play to finish in eighth place. They upset top-seeded Alcorn State, Alabama A&M, and Grambling State to become champions of the SWAC tournament and receiving the SWAC's automatic bid to the NCAA tournament for the third consecutive year. They lost to Fairleigh Dickinson in the First Four.

With a record of 14–20, Texas Southern entered the NCAA Tournament with the sixth-worst regular season record ever, with a winning percentage of 41.18%. It was also the most losses by an automatic bid in the history of the tournament.

== Roster ==
2023–24 Texas Southern Tigers men's basketball team
Players
Coaches

Pos.	#	Name	Height	Weight	Year	Previous school	Hometown
G	0	Kolby Granger	6 ft 5 in (1.96 m)	195 lb (88 kg)	RS So	Ridge Point High School	Missouri City, Texas
F	1	Kenny Hunter	6 ft 8 in (2.03 m)	236 lb (107 kg)	RS Jr	Louisiana Tech	Shreveport, Louisiana
F	2	Jahmar Young Jr.	6 ft 11 in (2.11 m)	240 lb (109 kg)	RS Sr	Memphis	Dallas, Texas
G	3	PJ Henry	5 ft 10 in (1.78 m)	177 lb (80 kg)	Sr	Hartford	Houston, Texas
G/F	4	Chris Craig	6 ft 4 in (1.93 m)	185 lb (84 kg)	Sr	North Lake College	Denton, Texas
G	5	Jaylen Wysinger	6 ft 0 in (1.83 m)	170 lb (77 kg)	Jr	Paris Junior College	Houston, Texas
G	7	Deon Stroud	6 ft 5 in (1.96 m)	204 lb (93 kg)	Sr	Eastern Washington	Fresno, California
F	8	Shaqir O'Neal	6 ft 8 in (2.03 m)	201 lb (91 kg)	RS So	Union Grove High School	Los Angeles, California
G	11	Jonathan Cisse	6 ft 1 in (1.85 m)	160 lb (73 kg)	Sr	Incarnate Word	Lafayette, Louisiana
G	12	Zytarious Mortle	6 ft 2 in (1.88 m)	199 lb (90 kg)	So	Sunrise Christian Academy	Alexandria, Louisiana
G	15	Zaire Hayes	6 ft 2 in (1.88 m)	185 lb (84 kg)	So	Northwest Kansas Tech	Houston, Texas
G	23	Mario Davis	6 ft 5 in (1.96 m)	180 lb (82 kg)	GS	Fisk	Houston, Texas
F	25	Grayson Carter	6 ft 10 in (2.08 m)	240 lb (109 kg)	RS So	UT Arlington	Dallas, Texas
G	32	Kehlin Farooq	6 ft 6 in (1.98 m)	196 lb (89 kg)	RS Jr	Hampton	Houston, Texas
F	35	Xavier Ball	6 ft 7 in (2.01 m)	232 lb (105 kg)	Jr	Lamar	Winnfield, Louisiana

Head coach

- Johnny Jones (LSU)

Assistant coach(es)

- Shyrone Chatman (Memphis)
- Josh White (North Texas)
- Stacy Hollowell (St. Edward's)
- John Jones (Texas Southern)

Legend

- (C) Team captain
- (S) Suspended
- (I) Ineligible
- (W) Walk-on
- Injured
- Current redshirt

Roster
Last update: December 7, 2023

== Schedule and results ==
Date time, TV	Rank^{#}	Opponent^{#}	Result	Record	High points	High rebounds	High assists	Site (attendance) city, state
Non-conference regular season
November 6, 2023*; 8:30 pm, MWN		at New Mexico	L 55–92	0–1	11 – Cisse	6 – Farooq	4 – Cisse	The Pit (11,106); Albuquerque, NM
November 11, 2023*; 2:30 pm, P12N		at Arizona State	L 52–63	0–2	12 – Henry	9 – Hunter	4 – Cisse	Desert Financial Arena (7,263); Tempe, AZ
November 16, 2023*; 6:00 pm, ACCN		at Virginia	L 33–62	0–3	7 – 2 Tied	5 – Young Jr.	1 – 5 Tied	John Paul Jones Arena (13,099); Charlottesville, VA
November 18, 2023*; 7:30 pm, FS2		at No. 8 Creighton	L 50–82	0–4	14 – Mortle	7 – 2 Tied	1 – 3 Tied	CHI Health Center Omaha (16,845); Omaha, NE
November 21, 2023*; 7:00 pm, SLN		at Oral Roberts	L 63–65	0–5	20 – Stroud	8 – Young Jr.	4 – Cisse	Mabee Center (5,893); Tulsa, OK
November 25, 2023*; 6:00 pm, ESPN+		at Drake	L 71–77	0–6	27 – Henry	6 – Young Jr.	4 – 2 Tied	Knapp Center (2,886); Des Moines, IA
November 28, 2023*; 8:30 pm, B1G		at No. 1 Purdue	L 67–99	0–7	25 – Mortle	7 – Stroud	7 – Stroud	Mackey Arena (14,876); West Lafayette, IN
December 16, 2023*; 8:30 pm, ESPN+		vs. North Carolina A&T; Chris Paul's HBCU Challenge	L 79–85	0–8	19 – Carter	9 – Granger	4 – 2 Tied	Michelob Ultra Arena; Paradise, NV
December 17, 2023*; 5:00 pm, ESPNU		vs. Howard; Chris Paul's HBCU Challenge	W 79–78	1–8	26 – Henry	6 – Henry	7 – Henry	Michelob Ultra Arena; Paradise, NV
December 21, 2023*; 6:00 pm, YouTube		Samford	L 65–87	1–9	13 – Henry	11 – Carter	2 – Wysinger	H&PE Arena (754); Houston, TX
December 28, 2023*; 6:00 pm, YouTube		Biblical Studies	W 108–72	2–9	16 – Henry	8 – Granger	5 – 2 Tied	H&PE Arena (770); Houston, TX
SWAC regular season
January 6, 2024; 5:30 pm		at Southern	L 51–58	2–10 (0–1)	11 – Cisse	12 – Hunter	5 – Cisse	F. G. Clark Center (3,259); Baton Rouge, LA
January 8, 2024; 7:30 pm		at Grambling State	W 54–52	3–10 (1–1)	16 – Hayes	8 – Hayes	6 – Cisse	Fredrick C. Hobdy Assembly Center (1,318); Grambling, LA
January 13, 2024; 5:00 pm, YouTube		Arkansas–Pine Bluff	L 67–70	3–11 (1–2)	21 – Cisse	9 – Cisse	3 – Cisse	H&PE Arena (1,208); Houston, TX
January 15, 2024; 7:30 pm, YouTube		Mississippi Valley State	W 93–61	4–11 (2–2)	21 – Cisse	8 – Carter	7 – Hayes	H&PE Arena (790); Houston, TX
January 20, 2024; 3:00 pm		at Alcorn State	W 72–61	5–11 (3–2)	17 – Carter	4 – Carter	5 – Henry	Davey Whitney Complex; Lorman, MS
January 22, 2024; 7:30 pm		at Jackson State	L 64–73	5–12 (3–3)	20 – Henry	6 – Hunter	2 – Wysinger	Williams Assembly Center (1,652); Jackson, MS
January 27, 2024; 5:00 pm, YouTube		Alabama A&M	W 85–69	6–12 (4–3)	21 – Stroud	7 – Carter	3 – Henry	H&PE Arena (3,109); Houston, TX
January 29, 2024; 7:30 pm, YouTube		Alabama State	W 56–55	7–12 (5–3)	21 – Henry	10 – Cisse	3 – Henry	H&PE Arena (1,300); Houston, TX
February 3, 2024; 5:30 pm		at Prairie View A&M	W 80–69	8–12 (6–3)	26 – Henry	11 – Young Jr.	3 – Cisse	William J. Nicks Building (3,514); Prairie View, TX
February 10, 2024; 3:00 pm		at Florida A&M	W 78–75 ^{OT}	9–12 (7–3)	24 – Mortle	7 – Wysinger	5 – Wysinger	Al Lawson Center (574); Tallahassee, FL
February 12, 2024; 7:30 pm		at Bethune–Cookman	L 79–83	9–13 (7–4)	17 – 2 Tied	7 – Granger	5 – Wysinger	Moore Gymnasium (889); Daytona Beach, FL
February 17, 2024; 5:00 pm, YouTube		Grambling State	L 63–66	9–14 (7–5)	14 – Stroud	8 – Hunter	3 – 2 Tied	H&PE Arena (1,800); Houston, TX
February 19, 2024; 7:30 pm, YouTube		Southern	W 68–56	10–14 (8–5)	23 – Henry	8 – Craig	4 – Cisse	H&PE Arena (3,009); Houston, TX
February 24, 2024; 6:00 pm		at Mississippi Valley State	W 73–52	11–14 (9–5)	16 – Henry	6 – Carter	3 – Cisse	Harrison HPER Complex (1,587); Itta Bena, MS
February 26, 2024; 7:30 pm		at Arkansas–Pine Bluff	W 77–70	12–14 (10–5)	25 – Henry	7 – Hunter	5 – Henry	H.O. Clemmons Arena (2,182); Pine Bluff, AR
March 2, 2024; 5:00 pm, YouTube		Jackson State	W 80–70	13–14 (11–5)	20 – 2 Tied	8 – Carter	6 – Cisse	H&PE Arena (4,036); Houston, TX
March 4, 2024; 7:30 pm, YouTube		Alcorn State	L 79–82	13–15 (11–6)	36 – Cisse	6 – Craig	7 – Henry	H&PE Arena (2,836); Houston, TX
March 9, 2024; 5:00 pm, YouTube		Prairie View A&M	W 93–78	14–15 (12–6)	21 – Henry	7 – 3 Tied	6 – Cisse	H&PE Arena (6,927); Houston, TX
SWAC tournament
March 14, 2024; 2:00 pm, ESPN+	(3)	vs. (6) Jackson State; Quarterfinals	W 73–62	15–15	24 – Cisse	8 – Tied	6 – Cisse	Bartow Arena (975); Birmingham, AL
March 15, 2024; 8:30 pm, ESPN+	(3)	vs. (7) Alabama A&M; Semifinals	W 72–65	16–15	18 – Cisse	6 – Tied	4 – Cisse	Bartow Arena (2,045); Birmingham, AL
March 16, 2024; 8:30 pm, ESPNU/ESPN+	(3)	vs. (1) Grambling State; Championship	L 66–75	16–16	21 – Cisse	5 – Stroud	2 – Wysinger	Bartow Arena (2,108); Birmingham, AL
CIT
March 19, 2024*; 6:00 pm, ESPN+		at Tarleton; First round – Lou Henson Classic	L 71–82	16–17	18 – Tied	8 – Cisse	6 – Cisse	Wisdom Gym (1,426); Stephenville, TX
*Non-conference game. ^{#}Rankings from AP Poll. (#) Tournament seedings in parentheses. All times are in Central.
