= 2023–24 North Carolina Central Eagles men's basketball team =

American college basketball season

2023–24 North Carolina Central Eagles men's basketball
- Conference: Mid-Eastern Athletic Conference
- Record: 18–13 (9–5 MEAC)
- Head coach: LeVelle Moton (15th season)
- Assistant coaches: Garrett Bridges; Reggie Sharp; Nigel Thomas
- Home arena: McDougald–McLendon Arena

2023–24 MEAC men's basketball standings
	Conf.				Overall
Team	W		L	PCT	W		L	PCT
Norfolk State	11	–	3	.786	24	–	11	.686
North Carolina Central	9	–	5	.643	18	–	13	.581
South Carolina State	9	–	5	.643	14	–	18	.438
Howard †	9	–	5	.643	18	–	17	.514
Morgan State	7	–	7	.500	11	–	20	.355
Delaware State	6	–	8	.429	15	–	19	.441
Maryland Eastern Shore	4	–	10	.286	9	–	20	.310
Coppin State	1	–	13	.071	2	–	27	.069
† 2024 MEAC tournament winner

The 2023–24 North Carolina Central Eagles men's basketball team represented North Carolina Central University during the 2023–24 NCAA Division I men's basketball season. The Eagles, led by 15th-year head coach LeVelle Moton, played their home games at McDougald–McLendon Arena in Durham, North Carolina as members of the Mid-Eastern Athletic Conference. They finished the season 18–13, 9–5 in MEAC play to finish in a three-way tie for second place. As the No. 2 seed in the MEAC tournament, they defeated Maryland Eastern Shore before losing to Delaware State in the semifinals.

== Previous season ==
The Eagles finished the 2022–23 season 18–12, 10–4 in MEAC play to finish in second place. They defeated Delaware State in the quarterfinals of the MEAC tournament, before falling to Norfolk State in the semifinals.

== Roster ==
2023–24 North Carolina Central Eagles men's basketball team
Players
Coaches

Pos.	#	Name	Height	Weight	Year	Hometown
G	0	Fred Cleveland Jr.	5 ft 9 in (1.75 m)	165 lb (75 kg)	Sr	Chicago, Illinois
G	1	Guy Fauntleroy	6 ft 0 in (1.83 m)	172 lb (78 kg)	So	Upper Marlboro, Maryland
F	2	Kye Dickson	6 ft 7 in (2.01 m)	189 lb (86 kg)	Jr	Toronto, Canada
G	3	Terrence Crawford	6 ft 2 in (1.88 m)	170 lb (77 kg)	Sr	Graham, North Carolina
F	5	Timmy Adedire	6 ft 4 in (1.93 m)	208 lb (94 kg)	Jr	Baltimore, Maryland
F	10	Devin Gordon	6 ft 5 in (1.96 m)	205 lb (93 kg)	Jr	Powder Springs, Georgia
G	11	Keishon Porter	6 ft 5 in (1.96 m)	195 lb (88 kg)	Jr	Pinetops, North Carolina
F	12	Perry Smith Jr.	6 ft 9 in (2.06 m)	230 lb (104 kg)	So	Augusta, Georgia
F	13	Emmanuel Izunabor	6 ft 8 in (2.03 m)	225 lb (102 kg)	RS Sr	Fayetteville, North Carolina
G	22	Chris Daniels	6 ft 1 in (1.85 m)	175 lb (79 kg)	Jr	Raleigh, North Carolina
G	23	Brock Williams	6 ft 0 in (1.83 m)	195 lb (88 kg)	Jr	Burlington, North Carolina
G	25	Caleb Ellison	6 ft 0 in (1.83 m)	148 lb (67 kg)	Fr	Winston-Salem, North Carolina
G	30	Josh Smith	6 ft 4 in (1.93 m)	175 lb (79 kg)	So	Chicago, Illinois
G	31	Cobey Harraway	6 ft 7 in (2.01 m)	187 lb (85 kg)	Jr	Seattle, Washington
F	32	Gbenga Olubi	6 ft 7 in (2.01 m)	200 lb (91 kg)	Jr	Corona, California
G	35	Po'Boigh King	6 ft 4 in (1.93 m)	195 lb (88 kg)	So	Roanoke Rapids, North Carolina
G	52	Ja'Darius Harris	6 ft 2 in (1.88 m)	175 lb (79 kg)	RS Sr	Trenton, Tennessee

Head coach

- LeVelle Moton (North Carolina Central)

Assistant coach(es)

- Garrett Bridges (St. Augustine's)
- Reggie Sharp (Auburn)
- Nigel Thomas (Langston)

Legend

- (C) Team captain
- (S) Suspended
- (I) Ineligible
- (W) Walk-on
- Injured
- Current redshirt

Roster
Last update: November 10, 2023

== Schedule and results ==
Date time, TV	Rank^{#}	Opponent^{#}	Result	Record	High points	High rebounds	High assists	Site (attendance) city, state
Non-conference regular season
November 6, 2023*; 8:00 pm, ESPN+		at No. 1 Kansas; John McLendon Classic	L 56–99	0–1	12 – Harris	5 – Smith Jr.	3 – Cleveland Jr.	Allen Fieldhouse (16,300); Lawrence, KS
November 9, 2023*; 7:00 pm		Virginia–Lynchburg	W 107–54	1–1	26 – King	10 – Adedire	7 – Smith	McDougald–McLendon Arena (1,471); Durham, NC
November 12, 2023*; 5:00 pm, ESPN+/SECN+		at Georgia	L 54–64	1–2	12 – Izunabor	8 – Izunabor	6 – Cleveland Jr.	Stegeman Coliseum (5,699); Athens, GA
November 14, 2023*; 7:00 pm		Mid-Atlantic Christian	W 113–50	2–2	20 – Harris	8 – Smith Jr.	7 – Cleveland Jr.	McDougald–McLendon Arena (1,264); Durham, NC
November 18, 2023*; 3:00 pm, ESPN+		at Longwood	L 66–73	2–3	16 – King	5 – Izunabor	3 – Fauntleroy	Joan Perry Brock Center (1,373); Farmville, VA
November 20, 2023*; 7:00 pm, FloHoops		at Campbell; Campbell Classic	W 78–75 ^{OT}	3–3	24 – Cleveland Jr.	9 – King	6 – Cleveland Jr.	Gore Arena (1,109); Buies Creek, NC
November 21, 2023*; 4:00 pm, FloHoops		vs. The Citadel; Campbell Classic	L 61–67	3–4	17 – Cleveland Jr.	10 – Izunabor	3 – Cleveland Jr.	Gore Arena; Buies Creek, NC
November 26, 2023*; 2:00 pm, ESPN+		at Coastal Carolina	W 70–58	4–4	21 – Harris	9 – King	4 – Cleveland Jr.	HTC Center (1,039); Conway, SC
December 2, 2023*; 3:00 pm		USC Upstate	L 82–85	4–5	17 – Smith Jr.	5 – Smith Jr.	4 – Smith	McDougald–McLendon Arena (1,017); Durham, NC
December 5, 2023*; 7:00 pm, ACCNX		at Virginia	L 47–77	4–6	12 – Smith Jr.	7 – Porter	2 – Tied	John Paul Jones Arena (13,459); Charlottesville, VA
December 9, 2023*; 4:30 pm, ESPN+		at Radford	L 74–82	4–7	19 – Smith	7 – Tied	3 – King	Dedmon Center (839); Radford, VA
December 12, 2023*; 7:00 pm, FloHoops		at North Carolina A&T; Rivalry	W 67–62	5–7	18 – Harris	8 – Izunabor	10 – Cleveland Jr.	Corbett Sports Center (4,033); Greensboro, NC
December 15, 2023*; 7:00 pm		St. Andrews	W 102–50	6–7	30 – Cleveland Jr.	14 – Adedire	4 – Cleveland Jr.	McDougald–McLendon Arena (1,263); Durham, NC
December 20, 2023*; 3:00 pm		Longwood	W 79–70	7–7	21 – Harris	10 – Harris	6 – Cleveland Jr.	McDougald–McLendon Arena (782); Durham, NC
January 3, 2024*; 7:00 pm		Truett McConnell	W 112–70	8–7	23 – Cleveland Jr.	8 – Gordon	6 – Tied	McDougald–McLendon Arena (616); Durham, NC
MEAC regular season
January 6, 2024; 12:00 pm, ESPNU		Howard	W 73–54	9–7 (1–0)	24 – Cleveland Jr.	11 – Adedire	7 – Cleveland Jr.	McDougald–McLendon Arena (1,852); Durham, NC
January 8, 2024; 7:30 pm		Norfolk State	W 60–58	10–7 (2–0)	20 – Harris	9 – Adedire	7 – Cleveland Jr.	McDougald–McLendon Arena (2,162); Durham, NC
January 20, 2024; 4:00 pm		at South Carolina State	L 68–71	10–8 (2–1)	19 – Tied	7 – Adedire	3 – Cleveland Jr.	SHM Memorial Center (875); Orangeburg, SC
January 27, 2024; 4:00 pm		at Maryland Eastern Shore	W 65–57	11–8 (3–1)	21 – Harris	9 – Cleveland Jr.	4 – Cleveland Jr.	Hytche Athletic Center (183); Princess Anne, MD
January 29, 2024; 7:30 pm		at Delaware State	W 69–66	12–8 (4–1)	22 – King	9 – Izunabor	3 – Cleveland Jr.	Memorial Hall (1,350); Dover, DE
February 3, 2024; 4:00 pm		Coppin State	W 77–46	13–8 (5–1)	19 – Cleveland Jr.	8 – Smith Jr.	7 – Cleveland Jr.	McDougald–McLendon Arena (2,875); Durham, NC
February 5, 2024; 7:30 pm		Morgan State	L 72–79 ^{OT}	13–9 (5–2)	17 – Porter	10 – Smith Jr.	8 – Cleveland Jr.	McDougald–McLendon Arena (2,057); Durham, NC
February 17, 2024; 4:00 pm, ESPN+		at Howard	L 82–90	13–10 (5–3)	20 – Cleveland Jr.	5 – Izunabor	2 – Harris	Burr Gymnasium (1,245); Washington, D.C.
February 19, 2024; 9:00 pm, ESPNU		at Norfolk State	L 74–80	13–11 (5–4)	18 – King	5 – King	4 – Cleveland Jr.	Joseph G. Echols Memorial Hall (3,525); Norfolk, VA
February 24, 2024; 4:00 pm		Maryland Eastern Shore	W 88–55	14–11 (6–4)	22 – Porter	8 – Tied	4 – Cleveland Jr.	McDougald–McLendon Arena (2,762); Durham, NC
February 26, 2024; 7:30 pm		Delaware State	W 93–81	15–11 (7–4)	34 – King	11 – Izunabor	10 – Cleveland Jr.	McDougald–McLendon Arena (2,324); Durham, NC
March 2, 2024; 4:00 pm		at Coppin State	W 83–58	16–11 (8–4)	21 – Porter	10 – Izunabor	15 – Cleveland Jr.	Physical Education Complex (507); Baltimore, MD
March 4, 2024; 7:30 pm		at Morgan State	L 79–88	16–12 (8–5)	27 – Cleveland Jr.	5 – Tied	6 – Cleveland Jr.	Talmadge L. Hill Field House (3,034); Baltimore, MD
March 7, 2024; 7:30 pm		South Carolina State	W 79–68	17–12 (9–5)	37 – Porter	8 – Cleveland Jr.	6 – Cleveland Jr.	McDougald–McLendon Arena (1,362); Durham, NC
MEAC tournament
March 13, 2024; 8:00 pm, ESPN+	(2)	vs. (7) Maryland Eastern Shore; Quarterfinals	W 87–81	18–12	21 – Cleveland Jr.	8 – Adedire	6 – Cleveland Jr.	Norfolk Scope; Norfolk, VA
March 15, 2024; 8:00 pm, ESPN+	(2)	vs. (6) Delaware State; Semifinals	L 58–71	18–13	19 – Porter	8 – Tied	3 – Harris	Norfolk Scope; Norfolk, VA
*Non-conference game. ^{#}Rankings from AP Poll. (#) Tournament seedings in parentheses. All times are in Eastern.
