= 2023–24 Morgan State Bears basketball team =

American college basketball season

2023–24 Morgan State Bears basketball
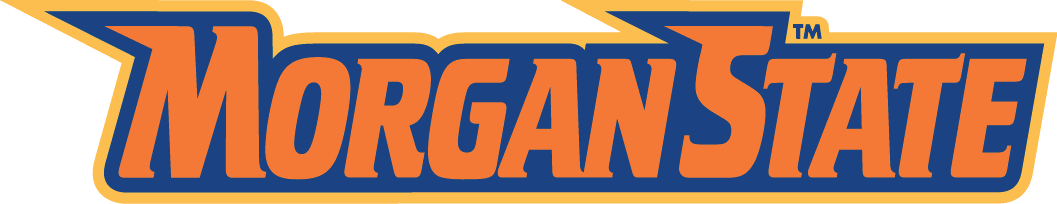
- Conference: Mid-Eastern Athletic Conference
- Record: 11–20 (7–7 MEAC)
- Head coach: Kevin Broadus (5th season)
- Assistant coaches: Chretien Lukusa; Keith Goodie; Austin Freeman
- Home arena: Talmadge L. Hill Field House

2023–24 MEAC men's basketball standings
	Conf.				Overall
Team	W		L	PCT	W		L	PCT
Norfolk State	11	–	3	.786	24	–	11	.686
North Carolina Central	9	–	5	.643	18	–	13	.581
South Carolina State	9	–	5	.643	14	–	18	.438
Howard †	9	–	5	.643	18	–	17	.514
Morgan State	7	–	7	.500	11	–	20	.355
Delaware State	6	–	8	.429	15	–	19	.441
Maryland Eastern Shore	4	–	10	.286	9	–	20	.310
Coppin State	1	–	13	.071	2	–	27	.069
† 2024 MEAC tournament winner

The 2023–24 Morgan State Bears basketball team represented Morgan State University during the 2023–24 NCAA Division I men's basketball season. The Bears, led by fifth-year head coach Kevin Broadus, played their home games at Talmadge L. Hill Field House in Baltimore, Maryland as members of the Mid-Eastern Athletic Conference. They finished the season 11–20, 7–7 in MEAC play to finish in fifth place. They lost in the quarterfinals of the MEAC tournament to Howard.

== Previous season ==
The Bears finished the 2022–23 season 15–16, 7–7 in MEAC play to finish in fifth place. They were defeated by Maryland Eastern Shore in the quarterfinals of the MEAC tournament.

== Roster ==
2023–24 Morgan State Bears men's basketball team
Players
Coaches

Pos.	#	Name	Height	Weight	Year	Hometown
G	0	Kamron Hobbs	5 ft 10 in (1.78 m)	170 lb (77 kg)	RS Jr	Stockbridge, Georgia
F	1	Wynston Tabbs	6 ft 3 in (1.91 m)	195 lb (88 kg)	RS Sr	Suitland, Maryland
G	2	Demajion Topps	6 ft 0 in (1.83 m)	175 lb (79 kg)	RS So	Winona, Mississippi
G	3	Rob Lawson	6 ft 0 in (1.83 m)	170 lb (77 kg)	So	Capitol Heights, Maryland
G	4	Kiran Oliver	6 ft 5 in (1.96 m)	190 lb (86 kg)	So	Chicago, Illinois
F	5	Myles Thompson	6 ft 7 in (2.01 m)	245 lb (111 kg)	RS Sr	Camden, New Jersey
F	10	Will Thomas	6 ft 6 in (1.98 m)	200 lb (91 kg)	RS Jr	Baltimore, Maryland
G	11	Amahrie Simpkins	6 ft 4 in (1.93 m)	190 lb (86 kg)	Jr	Brooklyn, New York
F	12	Daniel Akitoby	6 ft 9 in (2.06 m)	230 lb (104 kg)	Jr	Fairfax, Virginia
F	13	Trent Edwards	6 ft 8 in (2.03 m)	210 lb (95 kg)	Fr	Lexington, Kentucky
F	14	Staccardo Washington	6 ft 6 in (1.98 m)	208 lb (94 kg)	Fr	Upper Marlboro, Maryland
G	15	Marvin Brimage	6 ft 3 in (1.91 m)	170 lb (77 kg)	Fr	Washington, D.C.
F/C	21	Christian Oliver	7 ft 0 in (2.13 m)	250 lb (113 kg)	Jr	Pasadena, California
G/F	22	Kevon Wiggins	6 ft 3 in (1.91 m)	190 lb (86 kg)	Sr	Rose Hall, Guyana
G	23	Tytan Newton	6 ft 1 in (1.85 m)	170 lb (77 kg)	RS Fr	Indianapolis, Indiana
F	24	Allen Udemadu	6 ft 10 in (2.08 m)	235 lb (107 kg)	Jr	Lagos, Nigeria
F	55	Xavier Valley	6 ft 8 in (2.03 m)	205 lb (93 kg)	Jr	Atlanta, Georgia

Head coach

- Kevin Broadus (Bowie State)

Assistant coach(es)

- Chretien Lukusa (Binghamton)
- Keith Goodie (Morgan State)
- Austin Freeman (Georgetown)

Legend

- (C) Team captain
- (S) Suspended
- (I) Ineligible
- (W) Walk-on
- Injured
- Current redshirt

Roster
Last update: November 10, 2023

== Schedule and results ==
Date time, TV	Rank^{#}	Opponent^{#}	Result	Record	Site (attendance) city, state
Non-conference regular season
November 6, 2023*; 9:30 pm, P12N		at No. 12 Arizona	L 59–122	0–1	McKale Center (13,455); Tucson, AZ
November 9, 2023*; 6:00 pm		Cheyney	W 100–52	1–1	Talmadge L. Hill Field House (1,897); Baltimore, MD
November 12, 2023*; 12:00 pm		Penn State Wilkes-Barre	W 78–60	2–1	Talmadge L. Hill Field House (456); Baltimore, MD
November 15, 2023*; 10:30 pm		at Fresno State; Cancún Challenge campus site game	L 67–87	2–2	Save Mart Center; Fresno, CA
November 18, 2023*; 9:00 pm, ESPN+		at BYU	L 50–93	2–3	Marriott Center (13,736); Provo, UT
November 21, 2023*; 12:30 pm		vs. Radford; Cancún Challenge Mayan Division semifinals	L 72–82	2–4	Hard Rock Hotel Riviera Maya (107); Cancún, Mexico
November 22, 2023*; 12:30 pm		vs. Chicago State; Cancún Challenge Mayan Division 3rd place game	L 83–84	2–5	Hard Rock Hotel Riviera Maya (107); Cancún, Mexico
November 26, 2023*; 4:00 pm, FloSports		at Towson	L 58–67	2–6	SECU Arena (1,613); Towson, MD
November 29, 2023*; 7:00 pm, ESPN+		at High Point	L 59–77	2–7	Qubein Center (2,119); High Point, NC
December 3, 2023*; 2:00 pm		Longwood	L 54–88	2–8	Talmadge L. Hill Field House (876); Baltimore, MD
December 6, 2023*; 6:00 pm		UMBC	W 92–80	3–8	Talmadge L. Hill Field House (973); Baltimore, MD
December 9, 2023*; 12:00 pm		Virginia–Lynchburg	W 120–50	4–8	Talmadge L. Hill Field House (345); Baltimore, MD
December 18, 2023*; 7:00 pm, FloSports		at Campbell	L 76–83	4–9	Gore Arena (871); Buies Creek, NC
December 22, 2023*; 1:00 pm		No. 20 James Madison	L 75–89	4–10	Talmadge L. Hill Field House (878); Baltimore, MD
December 27, 2023*; 7:00 pm, ACCN		at Virginia	L 44–79	4–11	John Paul Jones Arena (14,637); Charlottesville, VA
December 31, 2023*; 6:00 pm, ESPN+		at NJIT	L 53–69	4–12	Wellness and Events Center (363); Newark, NJ
MEAC regular season
January 6, 2024; 4:00 pm		at Maryland Eastern Shore	L 74–75	4–13 (0–1)	Hytche Athletic Center (183); Princess Anne, MD
January 8, 2024; 7:30 pm		Delaware State	L 66–78	4–14 (0–2)	Talmadge L. Hill Field House (548); Baltimore, MD
January 20, 2024; 4:00 pm, ESPN+		at Coppin State	W 89–86 ^{OT}	5–14 (1–2)	Physical Education Complex (736); Baltimore, MD
January 27, 2024; 4:30 pm		Howard	W 85–79	6–14 (2–2)	Talmadge L. Hill Field House (3,571); Baltimore, MD
January 29, 2024; 7:30 pm		at Norfolk State	L 73–83	6–15 (2–3)	Joseph G. Echols Memorial Hall (3,013); Norfolk, VA
February 3, 2024; 4:00 pm		at South Carolina State	W 72–70	7–15 (3–3)	SHM Memorial Center (721); Orangeburg, SC
February 5, 2024; 7:30 pm		at North Carolina Central	W 79–72 ^{OT}	8–15 (4–3)	McDougald–McLendon Arena (2,057); Durham, NC
February 17, 2024; 4:30 pm		Maryland Eastern Shore	W 70–65	9–15 (5–3)	Talmadge L. Hill Field House (2,467); Baltimore, MD
February 19, 2024; 7:30 pm		at Delaware State	L 58–80	9–16 (5–4)	Memorial Hall (2,500); Dover, DE
February 24, 2024; 4:00 pm, ESPN+		at Howard	L 72–78	9–17 (5–5)	Burr Gymnasium (2,064); Washington, D.C.
February 26, 2024; 7:30 pm		Norfolk State	L 82–85	9–18 (5–6)	Talmadge L. Hill Field House (3,238); Baltimore, MD
March 2, 2024; 4:30 pm		South Carolina State	L 61–72	9–19 (5–7)	Talmadge L. Hill Field House (2,873); Baltimore, MD
March 4, 2024; 7:30 pm		North Carolina Central	W 88–79	10–19 (6–7)	Talmadge L. Hill Field House (3,034); Baltimore, MD
March 7, 2024; 7:30 pm		Coppin State	W 78–60	11–19 (7–7)	Talmadge L. Hill Field House (4,159); Baltimore, MD
MEAC tournament
March 14, 2024; 6:00 pm, ESPN+	(5)	vs. (4) Howard; Quarterfinals	L 65–78	11–20	Norfolk Scope; Norfolk, VA
*Non-conference game. ^{#}Rankings from AP Poll. (#) Tournament seedings in parentheses. All times are in Eastern.
