= 2023–24 Delaware State Hornets men's basketball team =

American college basketball season

2023–24 Delaware State Hornets men's basketball

CBI, first round
- Conference: Mid-Eastern Athletic Conference
- Record: 15–19 (6–8 MEAC)
- Head coach: Stan Waterman (3rd season)
- Assistant coaches: Horace Owens; Vernon Dupree Jr.; Shahid Perkins
- Home arena: Memorial Hall

2023–24 MEAC men's basketball standings
	Conf.				Overall
Team	W		L	PCT	W		L	PCT
Norfolk State	11	–	3	.786	24	–	11	.686
North Carolina Central	9	–	5	.643	18	–	13	.581
South Carolina State	9	–	5	.643	14	–	18	.438
Howard †	9	–	5	.643	18	–	17	.514
Morgan State	7	–	7	.500	11	–	20	.355
Delaware State	6	–	8	.429	15	–	19	.441
Maryland Eastern Shore	4	–	10	.286	9	–	20	.310
Coppin State	1	–	13	.071	2	–	27	.069
† 2024 MEAC tournament winner

The 2023–24 Delaware State Hornets men's basketball team represented Delaware State University during the 2023–24 NCAA Division I men's basketball season. The Hornets, led by third-year head coach Stan Waterman, played their home games at Memorial Hall in Dover, Delaware as members of the Mid-Eastern Athletic Conference (MEAC).

== Previous season ==
The Hornets finished the 2022–23 season 6–24, 4–10 in MEAC play, to finish tied for sixth place. They were defeated by North Carolina Central in the quarterfinals of the MEAC tournament.

== Roster ==
2023–24 Delaware State Hornets men's basketball team
Players
Coaches

Pos.	#	Name	Height	Weight	Year	Previous school	Hometown
G	0	Deywilk Tavarez	6 ft 2 in (1.88 m)	—	Fr	Academy of the New Church	Pennsauken, NJ
F	1	Alston Andrews	6 ft 10 in (2.08 m)	230 lb (104 kg)	Sr	Illinois State	Detroit, MI
G	2	Corey Perkins	6 ft 2 in (1.88 m)	185 lb (84 kg)	Jr	Sanford School	Wilmington, DE
G	3	Martaz Robinson	6 ft 2 in (1.88 m)	180 lb (82 kg)	Sr	New Town High School	Baltimore, MD
F	4	Kyle Johnson	6 ft 8 in (2.03 m)	190 lb (86 kg)	GS	Cal State Monterey Bay	San Diego, CA
G	5	Jevin Muniz	6 ft 6 in (1.98 m)	—	So	Believe Prep Academy	Bethlehem, PA
F	10	Cameron Stitt	6 ft 8 in (2.03 m)	205 lb (93 kg)	Jr	Porter Ridge High School	Charlotte, NC
G	11	Khyrie Staten	6 ft 1 in (1.85 m)	160 lb (73 kg)	Jr	Saint Frances Academy	Baltimore, MD
G/F	13	Ricky III Deadwyler	6 ft 4 in (1.93 m)	205 lb (93 kg)	Jr	Tower Hill School	Wilmington, DE
F	15	Wesley Oba	6 ft 8 in (2.03 m)	—	Jr	Florida SouthWestern State	Manchester, England
G	20	Elias Walker	6 ft 0 in (1.83 m)	170 lb (77 kg)	So	Wilkes	Cheltenham, PA
F	21	Caleb Surgers	6 ft 8 in (2.03 m)	—	Fr	Panther Creek High School	Cary, NC
G	22	Dean Shepherd	6 ft 3 in (1.91 m)	—	Fr	Tower Hill School	New Castle, DE
F	23	Brandon Stone	6 ft 11 in (2.11 m)	210 lb (95 kg)	GS	Robert Morris	Scottdale, PA
C	24	Raymond Somerville	6 ft 11 in (2.11 m)	235 lb (107 kg)	RS Jr	Cal State Bakersfield	Media, PA

Head coach

- Stan Waterman (Delaware)

Assistant coach(es)

- Horace Owens (Rhode Island)
- Vernon Dupree Jr. (Wilmington)
- Shahid Perkins (ETSU)

Legend

- (C) Team captain
- (S) Suspended
- (I) Ineligible
- (W) Walk-on
- Injured
- Current redshirt

Roster
Last update: November 26, 2023

== Schedule and results ==
Date time, TV	Rank^{#}	Opponent^{#}	Result	Record	Site (attendance) city, state
Exhibition
November 2, 2023*; 7:30 p.m.		Cabrini	W 101–58	–	Memorial Hall; Dover, DE
Non-conference regular season
November 6, 2023*; 7:00 p.m., B1G+		at Penn State	L 45–79	0–1	Bryce Jordan Center (7,345); University Park, PA
November 11, 2023*; 9:00 p.m., LHN		at No. 18 Texas	L 59–86	0–2	Moody Center (10,500); Austin, TX
November 15, 2023*; 7:00 p.m.		Delaware	L 67–78	0–3	Memorial Hall (1,544); Dover, DE
November 17, 2023*; 6:00 p.m.		vs. Grambling State; HBCU All-Star Classic	W 71–63	1–3	Forbes Arena; Atlanta, GA
November 20, 2023*; 7:00 p.m., ESPN+		at NJIT	L 72–81	1–4	Wellness and Events Center (383); Newark, NJ
November 24, 2023*; 3:00 p.m., ESPN+		at Longwood; Brock Challenge	L 82–84 ^{2OT}	1–5	Joan Perry Brock Center (1,147); Farmville, VA
November 25, 2023*; 5:30 p.m., ESPN+		vs. Bethune–Cookman; Brock Challenge	W 72–64	2–5	Joan Perry Brock Center (243); Farmville, VA
November 26, 2023*; 1:00 p.m., ESPN+		vs. Lamar; Brock Challenge	L 81–84 ^{OT}	2–6	Joan Perry Brock Center (427); Farmville, VA
November 30, 2023*; 7:00 p.m.		at Chicago State	W 76–69	3–6	Jones Convocation Center (111); Chicago, IL
December 2, 2023*; 5:00 p.m., ESPN+		at Loyola (MD)	W 79–73 ^{OT}	4–6	Reitz Arena (612); Baltimore, MD
December 5, 2023*; 7:00 p.m.		Gwynedd Mercy	W 105–58	5–6	Memorial Hall (750); Dover, DE
December 7, 2023*; 7:00 p.m.		Virginia–Lynchburg	W 106–73	6–6	Memorial Hall (550); Dover, DE
December 9, 2023*; 2:00 p.m.		Longwood	L 61–62	6–7	Memorial Hall (1,100); Dover, DE
December 18, 2023*; 7:00 p.m., ACCN		at Wake Forest	L 59–88	6–8	LJVM Coliseum (6,423); Winston-Salem, NC
December 20, 2023*; 7:00 p.m., ESPN+		at East Carolina	L 50–79	6–9	Williams Arena (3,878); Greenville, NC
December 30, 2023*; 12:00 p.m.		Mount St. Mary's	W 77–73	7–9	Memorial Hall (550); Dover, DE
MEAC regular season
January 6, 2024; 4:00 p.m.		Coppin State	W 55–53	8–9 (1–0)	Memorial Hall (850); Dover, DE
January 8, 2024; 7:30 p.m.		at Morgan State	W 78–66	9–9 (2–0)	Talmadge L. Hill Field House (548); Baltimore, MD
January 20, 2024; 4:00 p.m.		Maryland Eastern Shore	W 67–63 ^{OT}	10–9 (3–0)	Memorial Hall (1,500); Dover, DE
January 27, 2024; 4:00 p.m.		South Carolina State	L 64–66	10–10 (3–1)	Memorial Hall (1,500); Dover, DE
January 29, 2024; 7:30 p.m.		North Carolina Central	L 66–69	10–11 (3–2)	Memorial Hall (1,350); Dover, DE
February 3, 2024; 4:00 p.m.		at Norfolk State	L 64–65	10–12 (3–3)	Joseph G. Echols Memorial Hall (3,421); Norfolk, VA
February 5, 2024; 7:30 p.m.		Howard	L 71–75	10–13 (3–4)	Memorial Hall (1,100); Dover, DE
February 17, 2024; 4:00 p.m.		at Coppin State	W 66–56	11–13 (4–4)	Physical Education Complex (512); Baltimore, MD
February 19, 2024; 7:30 p.m.		Morgan State	W 80–58	12–13 (5–4)	Memorial Hall (2,500); Dover, DE
February 24, 2024; 4:00 p.m.		at South Carolina State	L 62–69	12–14 (5–5)	SHM Memorial Center (1,950); Orangeburg, SC
February 26, 2024; 7:30 p.m.		at North Carolina Central	L 81–93	12–15 (5–6)	McDougald–McLendon Arena (2,342); Durham, NC
March 2, 2024; 4:00 p.m.		Norfolk State	W 85–71	13–15 (6–6)	Memorial Hall (1,200); Dover, DE
March 4, 2024; 7:30 p.m.		at Howard	L 66–85	13–16 (6–7)	Burr Gymnasium (1,250); Washington, D.C.
March 7, 2024; 7:30 p.m.		at Maryland Eastern Shore	L 59–67	13–17 (6–8)	Hytche Athletic Center (183); Princess Anne, MD
MEAC tournament
March 14, 2024; 8:00 p.m., ESPN+	(6)	vs. (3) South Carolina State; Quarterfinals	W 71–58	14–17	Norfolk Scope; Norfolk, VA
March 15, 2024; 8:00 p.m., ESPN+	(6)	vs. (2) North Carolina Central; Semifinals	W 71–58	15–17	Norfolk Scope; Norfolk, VA
March 16, 2024; 1:00 p.m., ESPN2	(6)	vs. (4) Howard; Championship	L 67–70	15–18	Norfolk Scope; Norfolk, VA
CBI
March 23, 2024; 5:30 p.m., FloHoops	(14)	vs. (3) Seattle; First round	L 66–79	15–19	Ocean Center; Daytona Beach, FL
*Non-conference game. ^{#}Rankings from AP poll. (#) Tournament seedings in parentheses. All times are in Eastern.
