= 2023–24 South Carolina State Bulldogs basketball team =

American college basketball season

2023–24 South Carolina State Bulldogs basketball
- Conference: Mid-Eastern Athletic Conference
- Record: 14–18 (9–5 MEAC)
- Head coach: Erik Martin (2nd season)
- Assistant coaches: Bernie Coaxum; Raheem Waller; Pete Quinn
- Home arena: SHM Memorial Center

2023–24 MEAC men's basketball standings
	Conf.				Overall
Team	W		L	PCT	W		L	PCT
Norfolk State	11	–	3	.786	24	–	11	.686
North Carolina Central	9	–	5	.643	18	–	13	.581
South Carolina State	9	–	5	.643	14	–	18	.438
Howard †	9	–	5	.643	18	–	17	.514
Morgan State	7	–	7	.500	11	–	20	.355
Delaware State	6	–	8	.429	15	–	19	.441
Maryland Eastern Shore	4	–	10	.286	9	–	20	.310
Coppin State	1	–	13	.071	2	–	27	.069
† 2024 MEAC tournament winner

The 2023–24 South Carolina State Bulldogs basketball team represented South Carolina State University during the 2023–24 NCAA Division I men's basketball season. The Bulldogs, led by second-year head coach Erik Martin, played their home games at SHM Memorial Center in Orangeburg, South Carolina as members of the Mid-Eastern Athletic Conference. They finished the season 14–18, 9–5 in MEAC play to finish in a three-way tie for second place. As the No. 3 seed in the MEAC tournament, they lost to Delaware State in the quarterfinals.

== Previous season ==
The Bulldogs finished the 2022–23 season 5–26, 2–12 in MEAC play to finish in last place. They were defeated by top-seeded and eventual champions Howard in the quarterfinals of the MEAC tournament.

== Roster ==
2023–24 South Carolina State Bulldogs men's basketball team
Players
Coaches

Pos.	#	Name	Height	Weight	Year	Hometown
G	0	Omar Croskey	6 ft 6 in (1.98 m)	—	RS Jr	Sumter, South Carolina
G	1	Atiba Taylor	6 ft 4 in (1.93 m)	180 lb (82 kg)	RS Jr	Hackensack, New Jersey
G	2	Jordan Simpson	6 ft 5 in (1.96 m)	209 lb (95 kg)	So	Orangeburg, South Carolina
G	3	Michael Teal	6 ft 1 in (1.85 m)	160 lb (73 kg)	Jr	Alexandria, Virginia
F	4	Caleb McCarty	6 ft 8 in (2.03 m)	185 lb (84 kg)	Jr	Biloxi, Mississippi
G	5	Raquan Brown	6 ft 3 in (1.91 m)	200 lb (91 kg)	GS	Charlotte, North Carolina
G	11	Wilson Dubinsky	6 ft 3 in (1.91 m)	190 lb (86 kg)	Jr	Ottawa, Ontario
PG	12	Mitchel Taylor	6 ft 3 in (1.91 m)	170 lb (77 kg)	Fr	Atlanta, Georgia
C	13	Drayton Jones	6 ft 10 in (2.08 m)	240 lb (109 kg)	Fr	Houston, Texas
F/C	15	Elijah Charles	6 ft 10 in (2.08 m)	240 lb (109 kg)	Jr	Los Angeles, California
G	22	James Morrow	6 ft 8 in (2.03 m)	210 lb (95 kg)	Fr	Jacksonville, Florida
G	24	Shaman Alston	6 ft 4 in (1.93 m)	185 lb (84 kg)	Sr	Columbia, South Carolina
C	42	Dallas James	7 ft 0 in (2.13 m)	200 lb (91 kg)	Sr	Artesia, California
F	55	Davion Everett	6 ft 6 in (1.98 m)	215 lb (98 kg)	Jr	Columbia, South Carolina

Head coach

- Erik Martin (Cincinnati)

Assistant coach(es)

- Bernie Coaxum (College of Charleston)
- Raheem Waller (South Carolina State)
- Pete Quinn (Pfeiffer)

Legend

- (C) Team captain
- (S) Suspended
- (I) Ineligible
- (W) Walk-on
- Injured
- Current redshirt

Roster
Last update: November 9, 2023

== Schedule and results ==
Date time, TV	Rank^{#}	Opponent^{#}	Result	Record	High points	High rebounds	High assists	Site (attendance) city, state
Exhibition
October 30, 2023*; 7:00 pm		St. Augustine's	W 69–61	–	19 – Everett	7 – Everett	4 – A. Taylor	SHM Memorial Center; Orangeburg, SC
Regular season
November 6, 2023*; 7:00 pm		Voorhees	W 65–57	1–0	12 – Tied	14 – Everett	6 – M. Taylor	SHM Memorial Center (612); Orangeburg, SC
November 9, 2023*; 7:00 pm, ESPN+		at South Florida	L 52–96	1–1	11 – M. Taylor	5 – Tied	2 – Tied	Yuengling Center (3,807); Tampa, FL
November 13, 2023*; 7:00 pm		North Florida	W 87–77	2–1	21 – Croskey	10 – Everett	4 – Teal	SHM Memorial Center (369); Orangeburg, SC
November 17, 2023*; 7:30 pm, ESPN+		at Samford	L 72–89	2–2	15 – Croskey	9 – Simpson	4 – M. Taylor	Pete Hanna Center (1,023); Homewood, AL
November 20, 2023*; 8:00 pm, ESPN+		at Tulsa	L 70–90	2–3	19 – Jones	9 – McCarty	6 – M. Taylor	Reynolds Center (2.791); Tulsa, OK
November 22, 2023*; 7:00 pm, ESPN+/SECN+		at Missouri	L 59–82	2–4	19 – Everett	7 – Everett	2 – Tied	Mizzou Arena (9,745); Columbia, MO
November 25, 2023*; 3:00 pm		at Missouri State	L 74–92	2–5	18 – Dubinsky	5 – Everett	2 – Tied	Great Southern Bank Arena (3,197); Springfield, MO
November 28, 2023*; 7:00 pm, ESPN+		at Furman	L 78–86	2–6	23 – Everett	7 – Jones	5 – Teal	Timmons Arena (1,887); Greenville, SC
December 2, 2023*; 5:30 pm, ESPN+		at Charleston Southern	L 64–66	2–7	13 – Dubinsky	10 – Everett	1 – Tied	Buccaneer Field House (767); North Charleston, SC
December 9, 2023*; 2:00 pm		Bethune–Cookman	L 71–80	2–8	11 – Dubinsky	9 – Tied	3 – Tied	SHM Memorial Center (515); Orangeburg, SC
December 11, 2023*; 7:00 pm		Jacksonville	W 86–85 ^{OT}	3–8	17 – Teal	14 – McCarty	4 – Tied	SHM Memorial Center (369); Orangeburg, SC
December 16, 2023*; 2:00 pm, ACCN		at Pittsburgh	L 50–86	3–9	14 – A. Taylor	4 – Tied	3 – Alston	Petersen Events Center (8,370); Pittsburgh, PA
December 18, 2023*; 6:00 pm, ESPN+		at UNC Asheville	L 75–79	3–10	13 – Tied	5 – Tied	5 – Teal	Kimmel Arena (1,028); Asheville, NC
December 22, 2023*; 2:00 pm		Brewton–Parker	W 101–84	4–10	21 – Everett	12 – Everett	5 – Tied	SHM Memorial Center (210); Orangeburg, SC
December 29, 2023*; 7:30 pm, B1G+		at Nebraska	L 62–91	4–11	17 – Simpson	8 – Everett	2 – Tied	Pinnacle Bank Arena (14,987); Lincoln, NE
December 31, 2023*; 3:00 pm, ESPN+		at Oklahoma State	L 70–86	4–12	16 – Simpson	6 – Jones	4 – M. Taylor	Gallagher-Iba Arena (7,210); Stillwater, OK
January 6, 2024; 4:00 pm		Norfolk State	L 72–79	4–13 (0–1)	12 – M. Taylor	8 – Simpson	5 – Simpson	SHM Memorial Center (135); Orangeburg, SC
January 8, 2024; 7:30 pm		Howard	L 78–82	4–14 (0–2)	18 – M. Taylor	5 – Croskey	4 – Dubinsky	SHM Memorial Center (225); Orangeburg, SC
January 20, 2024; 4:00 pm		North Carolina Central	W 71–68	5–14 (1–2)	17 – Teal	6 – Simpson	6 – Teal	SHM Memorial Center (875); Orangeburg, SC
January 27, 2024; 4:00 pm		at Delaware State	W 66–64	6–14 (2–2)	17 – Dubinsky	5 – James	4 – Dubinsky	Memorial Hall (1,500); Dover, DE
January 29, 2024; 7:30 pm		at Maryland Eastern Shore	W 63–53	7–14 (3–2)	12 – Teal	12 – Everett	3 – Teal	Hytche Athletic Center (1,883); Princess Anne, MD
February 3, 2024; 4:00 pm		Morgan State	L 70–72	7–15 (3–3)	15 – Teal	9 – Everett	3 – Dubinsky	SHM Memorial Center (721); Orangeburg, SC
February 5, 2024; 7:30 pm		Coppin State	W 77–65	8–15 (4–3)	15 – McCarty	7 – Taylor	5 – Croskey	SHM Memorial Center (580); Orangeburg, SC
February 10, 2024*; 4:00 pm		Chicago State	W 78–55	9–15	19 – Tied	3 – Tied	2 – Tied	SHM Memorial Center (576); Orangeburg, SC
February 17, 2024; 4:00 pm		at Norfolk State	L 67–71 ^{OT}	9–16 (4–4)	16 – Croskey	13 – Brown	2 – Tied	Joseph G. Echols Memorial Hall (3,367); Norfolk, VA
February 19, 2024; 7:30 pm		at Howard	W 75–68	10–16 (5–4)	15 – Teal	6 – Everett	2 – Tied	Burr Gymnasium (1,452); Washington, D.C.
February 24, 2024; 4:00 pm		Delaware State	W 69–62	11–16 (6–4)	18 – Brown	8 – Jones	3 – Taylor	SHM Memorial Center (1,950); Orangeburg, SC
February 26, 2024; 7:30 pm		Maryland Eastern Shore	W 64–56	12–16 (7–4)	12 – M. Taylor	7 – Tied	4 – Teal	SHM Memorial Center (1,856); Orangeburg, SC
March 2, 2024; 4:00 pm		at Morgan State	W 72–61	13–16 (8–4)	12 – Tied	7 – Everett	4 – Tied	Talmadge L. Hill Field House (2,873); Baltimore, MD
March 4, 2024; 7:30 pm		at Coppin State	W 61–58	14–16 (9–4)	14 – M. Taylor	8 – Croskey	2 – Tied	Physical Education Complex (450); Baltimore, MD
March 7, 2024; 7:30 pm		at North Carolina Central	L 68–79	14–17 (9–5)	19 – Brown	9 – Croskey	4 – Taylor	McDougald–McLendon Arena (1,362); Durham, NC
MEAC tournament
March 14, 2024; 8:00 pm, ESPN+	(3)	vs. (6) Delaware State; Quarterfinals	L 58–71	14–18	13 – Croskey	5 – Croskey	2 – Tied	Norfolk Scope; Norfolk, VA
*Non-conference game. ^{#}Rankings from AP Poll. (#) Tournament seedings in parentheses. All times are in Eastern.
