= 2023–24 Maryland Eastern Shore Hawks men's basketball team =

American college basketball season

2023–24 Maryland Eastern Shore Hawks men's basketball
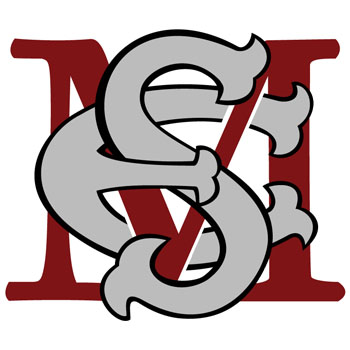
- Conference: Mid-Eastern Athletic Conference
- Record: 9–20 (4–10 MEAC)
- Head coach: Jason Crafton (4th season)
- Assistant coaches: Keith Coutreyer; Kassim Kaba; Steve Howard
- Home arena: Hytche Athletic Center

2023–24 MEAC men's basketball standings
	Conf.				Overall
Team	W		L	PCT	W		L	PCT
Norfolk State	11	–	3	.786	24	–	11	.686
North Carolina Central	9	–	5	.643	18	–	13	.581
South Carolina State	9	–	5	.643	14	–	18	.438
Howard †	9	–	5	.643	18	–	17	.514
Morgan State	7	–	7	.500	11	–	20	.355
Delaware State	6	–	8	.429	15	–	19	.441
Maryland Eastern Shore	4	–	10	.286	9	–	20	.310
Coppin State	1	–	13	.071	2	–	27	.069
† 2024 MEAC tournament winner

The 2023–24 Maryland Eastern Shore Hawks men's basketball team represented the University of Maryland Eastern Shore during the 2023–24 NCAA Division I men's basketball season. The Hawks, led by fourth-year head coach Jason Crafton, played their home games at the Hytche Athletic Center in Princess Anne, Maryland as members of the Mid-Eastern Athletic Conference (MEAC). They finished the season 9–20, 4–10 in MEAC play, to finish in seventh place. They lost to North Carolina Central in the quarterfinals of the MEAC tournament.

== Previous season ==
The Hawks finished the 2022–23 season 18–13, 9–5 in MEAC play, to finish tied for third place. They defeated Morgan State in the quarterfinals of the MEAC tournament, before falling to top-seeded and eventual tournament champions Howard in the semifinals.

== Roster ==
2023–24 Maryland Eastern Shore Hawks men's basketball team
Players
Coaches

Pos.	#	Name	Height	Weight	Year	Previous school	Hometown
G	0	Toby Nnadozie	6 ft 3 in (1.91 m)	185 lb (84 kg)	So	Mount Carmel HS	Baltimore, MD
G	1	Chace Davis	6 ft 3 in (1.91 m)	180 lb (82 kg)	Jr	St. Andrew's Episcopal School	Accokeek, MD
G	2	Dionte Johnson	6 ft 0 in (1.83 m)	190 lb (86 kg)	So	The Patrick School	The Bronx, NY
G	3	Elijah Wilson	6 ft 5 in (1.96 m)	190 lb (86 kg)	Jr	Toledo	Lithonia, GA
G	4	Tyler Mack	6 ft 5 in (1.96 m)	185 lb (84 kg)	Jr	Henry Ford College	Warren, MI
G	5	Damani Claxton	6 ft 0 in (1.83 m)	175 lb (79 kg)	So	Bossier Parish CC	The Bronx, NY
G	11	Devon Ellis	6 ft 6 in (1.98 m)	215 lb (98 kg)	So	State Fair CC	Chicago, IL
F	13	Victory Naboya	6 ft 9 in (2.06 m)	215 lb (98 kg)	So	Mount Zion Prep	Temple Hills, MD
G	14	Antwan Wilson	6 ft 5 in (1.96 m)	190 lb (86 kg)	Fr	Wicomico HS	Salisbury, MD
G/F	20	Israel Yaw	6 ft 9 in (2.06 m)	205 lb (93 kg)	So	ASA Brooklyn College	Georgetown, Guyana
F	22	Malang Athian	6 ft 7 in (2.01 m)	190 lb (86 kg)	Jr	Cloud County CC	Melbourne, Australia
F	24	Troy Hupstead	6 ft 7 in (2.01 m)	225 lb (102 kg)	Jr	Panola College	Mount Vernon, NY
F	33	Kelechi Okworogwo	6 ft 6 in (1.98 m)	215 lb (98 kg)	So	Austin Peay	The Bronx, NY

Head coach

- Jason Crafton (Nyack)

Assistant coach(es)

- Keith Coutreyer (Washington Adventist)
- Kassim Kaba (American International)
- Steve Howard (Clarks Summit)

Legend

- (C) Team captain
- (S) Suspended
- (I) Ineligible
- (W) Walk-on
- Injured
- Current redshirt

Roster
Last update: November 25, 2023

== Schedule and results ==
Date time, TV	Rank^{#}	Opponent^{#}	Result	Record	Site (attendance) city, state
Regular season
November 6, 2023*; 7:00 p.m., ESPN+		at Temple	L 65–85	0–1	Liacouras Center (4,601); Philadelphia, PA
November 11, 2023*; 3:00 p.m.		Cairn	W 83–65	1–1	Hytche Athletic Center (254); Princess Anne, MD
November 15, 2023*; 8:00 p.m.		Longwood	L 61–80	1–2	Hytche Athletic Center (1,886); Princess Anne, MD
November 18, 2023*; 4:00 p.m.		Penn	W 83–80 ^{OT}	2–2	Hytche Athletic Center (1,883); Princess Anne, MD
November 22, 2023*; 7:00 p.m., ACCNX/ESPN+		at Notre Dame	L 55–75	2–3	Joyce Center (5,179); Notre Dame, IN
November 25, 2023*; 1:00 p.m., ESPN+		at Liberty	L 62–99	2–4	Liberty Arena (2,524); Lynchburg, VA
December 1, 2023*; 8:00 p.m.		Hampton	Cancelled		Hytche Athletic Center; Princess Anne, MD
December 4, 2023*; 4:00 p.m., ESPN+		at East Carolina	L 52–63	2–5	Williams Arena; Greenville, NC
December 6, 2023*; 7:00 p.m., ESPN+/ACCNX		at NC State	L 61–93	2–6	Reynolds Coliseum (5,500); Raleigh, NC
December 18, 2023*; 7:00 p.m., ESPN+		at Marist	L 52–76	2–7	McCann Arena (697); Poughkeepsie, NY
December 22, 2023*; 7:00 p.m., ESPN+		at VCU	L 51–75	2–8	Siegel Center (7,098); Richmond, VA
December 30, 2023*; 6:00 p.m., ESPN+		at George Washington	L 63–69	2–9	Charles E. Smith Center (1,020); Washington, D.C.
January 2, 2024*; 8:00 p.m.		Clarks Summit	W 95–37	3–9	Hytche Athletic Center (183); Princess Anne, MD
January 6, 2024; 4:00 p.m.		Morgan State	W 75–74	4–9 (1–0)	Hytche Athletic Center (183); Princess Anne, MD
January 8, 2024; 8:00 p.m.		at Coppin State	L 55–58 ^{OT}	4–10 (1–1)	Physical Education Complex (403); Baltimore, MD
January 13, 2024; 4:00 p.m.		at Howard	L 61–72	4–11 (1–2)	Burr Gymnasium (1,200); Washington, D.C.
January 20, 2024; 4:00 p.m.		at Delaware State	L 63–67 ^{OT}	4–12 (1–3)	Memorial Hall (1,500); Dover, DE
January 22, 2024*; 8:00 p.m.		Queens College	W 71–61	5–12	Hytche Athletic Center (183); Princess Anne, MD
January 27, 2024; 4:00 p.m.		North Carolina Central	L 57–65	5–13 (1–4)	Hytche Athletic Center (183); Princess Anne, MD
January 29, 2024; 8:00 p.m.		South Carolina State	L 53–63	5–14 (1–5)	Hytche Athletic Center (1,883); Princess Anne, MD
February 5, 2024; 8:00 p.m.		Norfolk State	W 69–60	6–14 (2–5)	Hytche Athletic Center (183); Princess Anne, MD
February 10, 2024*; 4:00 p.m.		Bryn Athyn	W 88–55	7–14	Hytche Athletic Center (183); Princess Anne, MD
February 17, 2024; 4:00 p.m.		at Morgan State	L 65–70	7–15 (2–6)	Talmadge L. Hill Field House (2,467); Baltimore, MD
February 19, 2024; 8:00 p.m.		Coppin State	W 75–67	8–15 (3–6)	Hytche Athletic Center (183); Princess Anne, MD
February 24, 2024; 4:00 p.m.		at North Carolina Central	L 55–88	8–16 (3–7)	McDougald–McLendon Arena (2,762); Durham, NC
February 26, 2024; 8:00 p.m.		at South Carolina State	L 56–64	8–17 (3–8)	SHM Memorial Center (1,856); Orangeburg, SC
March 2, 2024; 4:00 p.m.		Howard	L 66–70	8–18 (3–9)	Hytche Athletic Center (911); Princess Anne, MD
March 4, 2024; 8:00 p.m.		at Norfolk State	L 50–69	8–19 (3–10)	Joseph G. Echols Memorial Hall (1,881); Norfolk, VA
March 7, 2024; 8:00 p.m.		Delaware State	W 67–59	9–19 (4–10)	Hytche Athletic Center (183); Princess Anne, MD
MEAC tournament
March 13, 2024; 8:00 p.m., ESPN+	(7)	vs. (2) North Carolina Central; Quarterfinals	L 81–87	9–20	Norfolk Scope; Norfolk, VA
*Non-conference game. ^{#}Rankings from AP poll. (#) Tournament seedings in parentheses. All times are in Eastern.
