= 2023–24 Howard Bison men's basketball team =

American college basketball season

2023–24 Howard Bison men's basketball

MEAC tournament champions

NCAA tournament, First Four
- Conference: Mid-Eastern Athletic Conference
- Record: 18–17 (9–5 MEAC)
- Head coach: Kenny Blakeney (5th season)
- Assistant coaches: Rod Balanis; Tyler Thornton; Steve Ongley
- Home arena: Burr Gymnasium

2023–24 MEAC men's basketball standings
	Conf.				Overall
Team	W		L	PCT	W		L	PCT
Norfolk State	11	–	3	.786	24	–	11	.686
North Carolina Central	9	–	5	.643	18	–	13	.581
South Carolina State	9	–	5	.643	14	–	18	.438
Howard †	9	–	5	.643	18	–	17	.514
Morgan State	7	–	7	.500	11	–	20	.355
Delaware State	6	–	8	.429	15	–	19	.441
Maryland Eastern Shore	4	–	10	.286	9	–	20	.310
Coppin State	1	–	13	.071	2	–	27	.069
† 2024 MEAC tournament winner

The 2023–24 Howard Bison men's basketball team represented Howard University during the 2023–24 NCAA Division I men's basketball season. The Bison were led by fifth-year head coach Kenny Blakeney, and played their home games at Burr Gymnasium located in Washington, D.C. as members of the Mid-Eastern Athletic Conference (MEAC). They finished the season 18–14, 9–5 in MEAC play, to finish in a three-way tie for second place. As the No. 4 seed in the MEAC tournament, they defeated Morgan State, Norfolk State and Delaware State to win the tournament championship. As a result, they received the conference's automatic bid to the NCAA tournament as a No. 16 seed in the West region, where they lost to Wagner in the First Four.

== Previous season ==
The Bison finished the 2022–23 season 19–12, 11–3 in MEAC play, to finish in first place. As the No. 1 seed, they defeated South Carolina State, Maryland Eastern Shore and Norfolk State to win the MEAC tournament. They received the conference's automatic bid to the NCAA tournament, Howard's first appearance in the tournament since 1992. As the No. 16 seed in the West Region, they were defeated by No. 1 seed Kansas in the first round.

== Roster ==
2023–24 Howard Bison men's basketball team
Players
Coaches

Pos.	#	Name	Height	Weight	Year	Previous school	Hometown
G	0	Marcus Dockery	6 ft 2 in (1.88 m)	170 lb (77 kg)	Jr	Maryland	Washington, D.C.
F	2	Dom Campbell	6 ft 9 in (2.06 m)	268 lb (122 kg)	So	Notre Dame	Scarborough, ME
G	3	Isiah Warfield	6 ft 5 in (1.96 m)	—	GS	Liberty	Monaca, PA
F	4	Miles Stewart	6 ft 7 in (2.01 m)	202 lb (92 kg)	RS So	Lake Highland Prep	Orlando, FL
G	5	Jelani Williams	6 ft 5 in (1.96 m)	201 lb (91 kg)	GS	Penn	Washington, D.C.
G	10	Talin Lewis	6 ft 4 in (1.93 m)	182 lb (83 kg)	GS	Corban	Westlake Village, CA
G	11	Ose Okojie	6 ft 5 in (1.96 m)	191 lb (87 kg)	So	United Scholastic Academy	Brampton, ON
G	12	Elijah Williams	6 ft 6 in (1.98 m)	190 lb (86 kg)	GS	Gettysburg	Washington, D.C.
G	13	Thomas Weaver	5 ft 10 in (1.78 m)	156 lb (71 kg)	Sr	Riverdale Baptist School	Upper Marlboro, MD
F	14	Ayodele Taiwo	6 ft 9 in (2.06 m)	243 lb (110 kg)	RS So	NBA Academy Africa	Lagos, Nigeria
G	20	Jordan Atkins	6 ft 2 in (1.88 m)	—	Fr	Rutgers Prep	South Orange, NJ
G	21	Quint Booker	6 ft 3 in (1.91 m)	—	Fr	Bishop Ireton High School	Alexandria, VA
F	22	Shy Odom	6 ft 6 in (1.98 m)	229 lb (104 kg)	So	Sierra Canyon School	Chatsworth, CA
G	23	Jordan Hairston	6 ft 0 in (1.83 m)	—	GS	Texas–Tyler	Fairfax, VA
G	24	Dylan Metoyer	6 ft 1 in (1.85 m)	—	Fr	Sierra Canyon School	Chatsworth, CA
G	30	Joshua Strong	6 ft 0 in (1.83 m)	—	GS	Minnesota–Duluth	Brooklyn Park, MN
F	31	Seth Towns	6 ft 9 in (2.06 m)	230 lb (104 kg)	GS	Ohio State	Columbus, OH
G	34	Bryce Harris	6 ft 4 in (1.93 m)	220 lb (100 kg)	Jr	Putnam Science	Brentwood, NY
G	40	AJ Magbegor	6 ft 7 in (2.01 m)	—	Fr	Diamond V.E.	Queensland, Australia
G	55	Freedom Rhames	5 ft 11 in (1.8 m)	169 lb (77 kg)	So	Brewster Academy	Los Angeles, CA

Head coach

- Kenny Blakeney (Duke)

Assistant coach(es)

- Rod Balanis (Georgia Tech)
- Tyler Thornton (Duke)
- Steve Ongley (Southern Connecticut)

Legend

- (C) Team captain
- (S) Suspended
- (I) Ineligible
- (W) Walk-on
- Injured
- Current redshirt

Roster
Last update: November 14, 2023

== Schedule and results ==
Date time, TV	Rank^{#}	Opponent^{#}	Result	Record	Site (attendance) city, state
Exhibition
October 25, 2023*; 7:00 p.m.		Capital	W 83–79	–	Burr Gymnasium; Washington, D.C.
October 31, 2023*; 7:00 p.m.		American	W 69–61	–	Burr Gymnasium; Washington, D.C.
Regular season
November 6, 2023*; 7:00 p.m., ESPN+		Hampton	W 92–80	1–0	Burr Gymnasium (2,500); Washington, D.C.
November 9, 2022*; 7:00 p.m., ACCNX		at Georgia Tech	L 85–88	1–1	McCamish Pavilion (3,802); Atlanta, GA
November 12, 2023*; 4:00 p.m., ESPN+		at James Madison	L 86–107	1–2	Atlantic Union Bank Center (4,443); Harrisonburg, VA
November 14, 2023*; 7:30 p.m.		Boston University	W 64–53	2–2	Burr Gymnasium (2,413); Washington, D.C.
November 18, 2023*; 6:00 p.m., BTN		at Rutgers	L 63–85	2–3	Jersey Mike's Arena (8,000); Piscataway, NJ
November 20, 2023*; 7:00 p.m., ESPN+		at Bryant	L 61–67	2–4	Chace Athletic Center (754); Smithfield, RI
November 25, 2023*; 4:00 p.m., ESPN+		at Mount St. Mary's	W 87–83 ^{2OT}	3–4	Knott Arena (1,215); Emmitsburg, MD
November 28, 2023*; 7:00 p.m., ESPN+		Cincinnati	L 81–86 ^{OT}	3–5	Burr Gymnasium (1,324); Washington, D.C.
December 11, 2023*; 7:00 p.m., ESPN+		at Penn	L 68–78	3–6	Palestra (1,062); Philadelphia, PA
December 13, 2023*; 1:00 p.m., MSN		Regent	W 88–49	4–6	Burr Gymnasium (298); Washington, D.C.
December 17, 2023*; 12:00 a.m., ESPNU		vs. Jackson State; CP3 HBCU Challenge	L 74–81	4–7	Michelob Ultra Arena (1,306); Paradise, NV
December 17, 2023*; 6:00 p.m., ESPNU		vs. Texas Southern; CP3 HBCU Challenge	L 78–79	4–8	Michelob Ultra Arena; Paradise, NV
December 20, 2023*; 10:00 p.m., ESPN+		at UC Santa Barbara	L 81–94	4–9	The Thunderdome (1,073); Santa Barbara, CA
December 30, 2023*; 2:00 p.m., ESPN+		at La Salle	W 71–66	5–9	Tom Gola Arena (1,732); Philadelphia, PA
January 3, 2024*; 4:00 p.m.		Yale	L 78–86 ^{OT}	5–10	Burr Gymnasium (557); Washington, D.C.
January 6, 2024; 12:00 p.m., ESPNU		at North Carolina Central	L 54–73	5–11 (0–1)	McDougald–McLendon Arena (1,852); Durham, NC
January 8, 2024; 7:30 p.m.		at South Carolina State	W 82–78	6–11 (1–1)	SHM Memorial Center (225); Orangeburg, SC
January 13, 2024; 4:00 p.m.		Maryland Eastern Shore	W 72–61	7–11 (2–1)	Burr Gymnasium (1,200); Washington, D.C.
January 15, 2024*; 7:00 p.m., ESPN+		Morehouse; MLK Day Classic	W 78–72	8–11	Burr Gymnasium (1,256); Washington, D.C.
January 20, 2024; 4:00 p.m.		Norfolk State	L 61–65	8–12 (2–2)	Burr Gymnasium (1,943); Washington, D.C.
January 27, 2024; 4:00 p.m.		at Morgan State	L 79–85	8–13 (2–3)	Talmadge L. Hill Field House (3,571); Baltimore, MD
January 29, 2024; 7:30 p.m., ESPN+		at Coppin State	W 81–66	9–13 (3–3)	Physical Education Complex (612); Baltimore, MD
February 3, 2024*; 4:00 p.m., TNT		vs. Hampton; Invesco QQQ Legacy Classic	L 61–63	9–14	Prudential Center (13,834); Newark, NJ
February 5, 2024; 7:30 p.m.		at Delaware State	W 75–71	10–14 (4–3)	Memorial Hall (1,100); Dover, DE
February 17, 2024; 4:00 p.m., ESPN+		North Carolina Central	W 90–82	11–14 (5–3)	Burr Gymnasium (1,245); Washington, D.C.
February 19, 2024; 7:30 p.m., ESPN+		South Carolina State	L 68–75	11–15 (5–4)	Burr Gymnasium (1,452); Washington, D.C.
February 24, 2024; 4:00 p.m., ESPN+		Morgan State	W 78–72	12–15 (6–4)	Burr Gymnasium (2,064); Washington, D.C.
February 26, 2024; 7:30 p.m., ESPN+		Coppin State	W 78–69	13–15 (7–4)	Burr Gymnasium (1,200); Washington, D.C.
March 2, 2024; 4:00 p.m.		at Maryland Eastern Shore	W 70–66	14–15 (8–4)	Hytche Athletic Center (911); Princess Anne, MD
March 4, 2024; 7:30 p.m., ESPN+		Delaware State	W 85–66	15–15 (9–4)	Burr Gymnasium (1,250); Washington, D.C.
March 7, 2024; 9:00 p.m., ESPNU		at Norfolk State	L 58–77	15–16 (9–5)	Joseph G. Echols Memorial Hall (4,176); Norfolk, VA
MEAC tournament
March 14, 2024; 6:00 p.m., ESPN+	(4)	vs. (5) Morgan State; Quarterfinals	W 78–65	16–16	Norfolk Scope; Norfolk, VA
March 15, 2024; 6:00 p.m., ESPN+	(4)	vs. (1) Norfolk State; Semifinals	W 80–74	17–16	Norfolk Scope; Norfolk, VA
March 16, 2024; 1:00 p.m., ESPN2	(4)	vs. (6) Delaware State; Championship	W 70–67	18–16	Norfolk Scope; Norfolk, VA
NCAA tournament
March 19, 2024; 6:40 p.m., TruTV	(16 W)	vs. (16 W) Wagner; First Four	L 68–71	18–17	UD Arena; Dayton, OH
*Non-conference game. ^{#}Rankings from AP poll. (#) Tournament seedings in parentheses. All times are in Eastern.
