= Tony Jasick =

American basketball player and coach

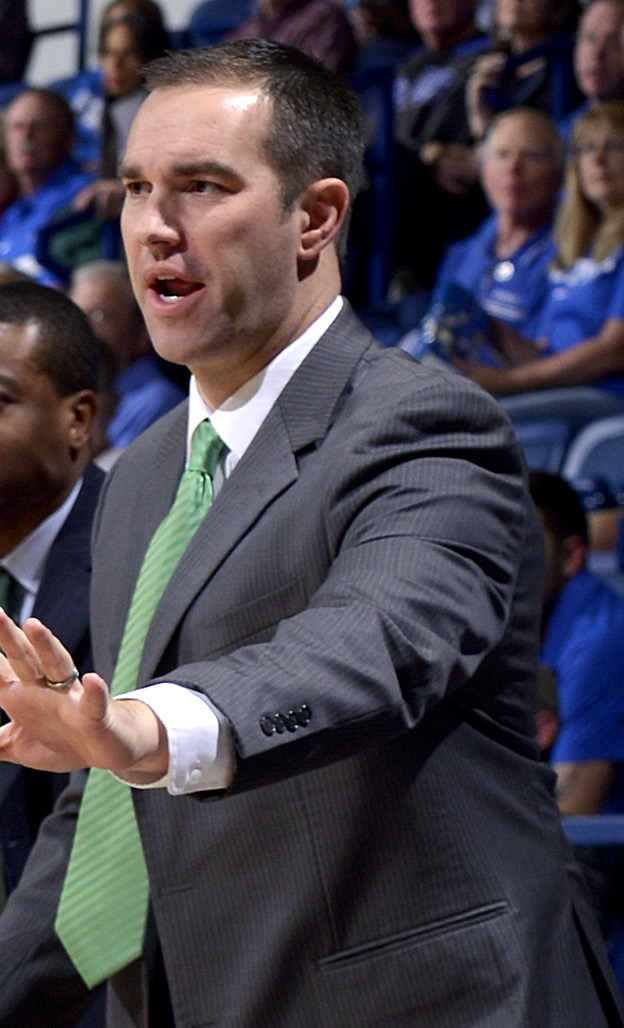
- Jasick in 2016 at Clune Arena

Current position
- Title: Head coach
- Team: Lincoln Memorial
- Conference: South Atlantic Conference

Biographical details
- Born: April 17, 1978 (age 48); Whitehall, Michigan, U.S.
- Education: Mars Hill College (2000)

Playing career
- 1996–1998: Muskegon CC

Coaching career (HC unless noted)
- 2002–2003: North Alabama (volunteer asst.)
- 2003–2004: Newberry (assistant)
- 2004–2005: Middle Tennessee (assistant)
- 2005–2011: IPFW (assistant)
- 2011–2014: IPFW
- 2014–2021: Jacksonville
- 2021–2025: Stephen F. Austin (associate HC)
- 2025: Stephen F. Austin (interim HC)
- 2025–present: Lincoln Memorial

Head coaching record
- Overall: 153–176 (.465)

Accomplishments and honors

Awards
- Hugh Durham Award (2014)

Anthony Michael Jasick (born April 17, 1978) is an American men's college basketball coach who is currently the head coach at Lincoln Memorial University. He was previously the head coach at Jacksonville and IPFW.

== Early life and education ==
Born and raised in Whitehall, Michigan, Jasick graduated from Whitehall High School in 1996. Jasick played point guard at Whitehall.

After high school, Jasick attended Muskegon Community College and also played basketball there before transferring to Mars Hill College, where he graduated with a B.S. in biology education in 2000. Jasick later completed a master's in education in 2002 at Lincoln Memorial University.

== Coaching career ==
=== Early career (2002-2005) ===
Jasick began his coaching career in 2002 at the Division II level as a volunteer assistant at North Alabama. In 2003, Jasick became an assistant at Newberry College before getting his first Division I job as an assistant at Middle Tennessee under Kermit Davis in 2004–05.

=== IPFW (2005-2014) ===
==== Assistant coach ====
From 2005 to 2011, Jasick was an assistant at IPFW as the school moved from independence to the Summit League in the 2007–08 season.

==== Head coach ====
On April 20, 2011, IPFW promoted Jasick to head coach. Originally signed to a five-year contract in 2011, Jasick got an extension through the 2017–18 season on October 10, 2013, following a 16-win season in 2012–13, the program's most wins in 20 seasons. Two months later, IPFW got its first ranking in the Collegeinsider.com Mid-Major Top 25. On January 2, 2014, IPFW beat Bowling Green on the road 65–60 for the program's first road win over a MAC opponent. IPFW finished the season 25–11 and made the second round of the 2014 CollegeInsider.com Postseason Tournament.

=== Jacksonville (2014-2021) ===
On April 9, 2014, Jacksonville University hired Jasick as head coach. Jacksonville improved from 10 to 22 in Jasick's first season in 2014–15 to 16–16 in 2015–16. Jasick was fired on March 8, 2021.

=== Stephen F. Austin (2021-2025) ===
On June 11, 2021, Stephen F. Austin head coach Kyle Keller hired Jasick as associate head coach. On January 27, 2025, Jasick was named interim head coach of the Lumberjacks for the remainder of the season after Keller was fired.

=== Lincoln Memorial (2025-present) ===
Jasick became the head coach at Lincoln Memorial University on April 22, 2025.

== Head coaching record ==
=== NCAA Division I ===
Record table
Season	Coach	Overall	Conference	Standing	Postseason
IPFW Mastodons (Summit League) (2011–2014)
2011–12	IPFW	11–19	5–13	8th	
2012–13	IPFW	16–17	7–9	5th	
2013–14	IPFW	25–11	10–4	T–2nd	CIT Second Round
IPFW:		52–47 (.525)	22–26 (.458)		
Jacksonville Dolphins (ASUN Conference) (2014–2021)
2014–15	Jacksonville	10–22	4–10	T–6th	
2015–16	Jacksonville	16–16	8–6	T–2nd	
2016–17	Jacksonville	17–16	5–9	6th	CIT First Round
2017–18	Jacksonville	15–18	8–6	3rd	
2018–19	Jacksonville	12–20	5–11	7th	
2019–20	Jacksonville	14–18	7–9	T–6th	
2020–21	Jacksonville	11–13	5–9	8th	
Jacksonville:		95–123 (.436)	42–60 (.412)		
Stephen F. Austin Lumberjacks (Southland Conference) (2025)
2024–25	Stephen F. Austin	6–6	6–6	10th	
Stephen F. Austin:		6–6 (.500)	6–6 (.500)		
Total:		153–176 (.465)			
National champion Postseason invitational champion Conference regular season champion Conference regular season and conference tournament champion Division regular season champion Division regular season and conference tournament champion Conference tournament champion

=== NCAA Division II ===
Record table
Season	Coach	Overall	Conference	Standing	Postseason
Lincoln Memorial Railsplitters (South Atlantic Conference) (2025–present)
2025–26	Lincoln Memorial	0-0	0-0		
Lincoln Memorial:		0–0 (–)	0–0 (–)		
Total:		0–0 (–)			
National champion Postseason invitational champion Conference regular season champion Conference regular season and conference tournament champion Division regular season champion Division regular season and conference tournament champion Conference tournament champion
