= 2023–24 Norfolk State Spartans men's basketball team =

American college basketball season

2023–24 Norfolk State Spartans men's basketball
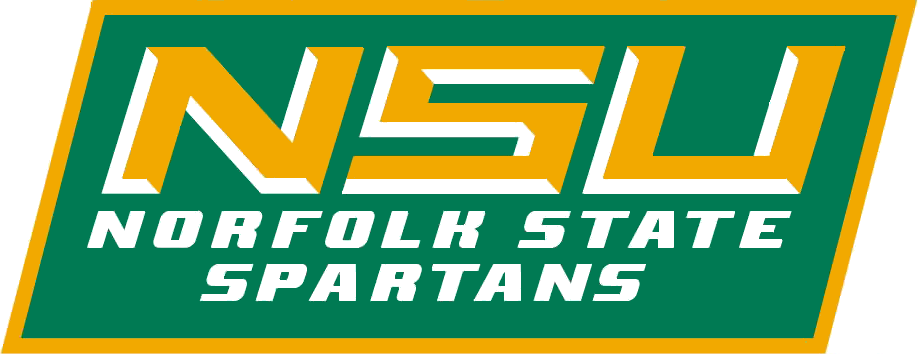

MEAC regular season champions CIT champions
- Conference: Mid-Eastern Athletic Conference
- Record: 24–11 (11–3 MEAC)
- Head coach: Robert Jones (11th season)
- Associate head coach: Jamal Brown
- Assistant coaches: C.J. Clemons; Leonard Fairley
- Home arena: Joseph G. Echols Memorial Hall

2023–24 MEAC men's basketball standings
	Conf.				Overall
Team	W		L	PCT	W		L	PCT
Norfolk State	11	–	3	.786	24	–	11	.686
North Carolina Central	9	–	5	.643	18	–	13	.581
South Carolina State	9	–	5	.643	14	–	18	.438
Howard †	9	–	5	.643	18	–	17	.514
Morgan State	7	–	7	.500	11	–	20	.355
Delaware State	6	–	8	.429	15	–	19	.441
Maryland Eastern Shore	4	–	10	.286	9	–	20	.310
Coppin State	1	–	13	.071	2	–	27	.069
† 2024 MEAC tournament winner

The 2023–24 Norfolk State Spartans men's basketball team represented Norfolk State University in the 2023–24 NCAA Division I men's basketball season. The Spartans, led by eleventh-year head coach Robert Jones, played their home games at the Joseph G. Echols Memorial Hall in Norfolk, Virginia as members of the Mid-Eastern Athletic Conference.

== Previous season ==
The Spartans finished the 2022–23 season 20–10, 9–5 in MEAC play to tie for third place with Maryland Eastern Shore. As the No. 3 seed in the MEAC tournament, they defeated Coppin State and North Carolina Central before falling to Howard in the championship game.

== Roster ==
2023–24 Norfolk State Spartans men's basketball team
Players
Coaches

Pos.	#	Name	Height	Weight	Year	Hometown
G	0	Christian Ings	6 ft 2 in (1.88 m)	180 lb (82 kg)	Jr	Philadelphia, Pennsylvania
G	1	George Beale Jr.	6 ft 4 in (1.93 m)	200 lb (91 kg)	So	Suffolk, Virginia
G	2	Terrance Jones	6 ft 3 in (1.91 m)	180 lb (82 kg)	Jr	Trenton, New Jersey
G	3	Gilbert Brown II	6 ft 0 in (1.83 m)	175 lb (79 kg)	Jr	Columbia, South Carolina
G/F	5	Tyrese Jenkins	6 ft 6 in (1.98 m)	200 lb (91 kg)	Sr	Richmond, Virginia
G	6	Jamarii Thomas	6 ft 0 in (1.83 m)	185 lb (84 kg)	Jr	Greensboro, North Carolina
F	7	Kuluel Mading	6 ft 9 in (2.06 m)	210 lb (95 kg)	Jr	High Point, North Carolina
F	8	Tyrel Bladen	6 ft 10 in (2.08 m)	235 lb (107 kg)	GS	Coatesville, Pennsylvania
G	9	Allen Betrand	6 ft 5 in (1.96 m)	200 lb (91 kg)	GS	Philadelphia, Pennsylvania
G	11	Jaylani Darden	6 ft 5 in (1.96 m)	175 lb (79 kg)	Jr	Norfolk, Virginia
G/F	13	Daryl Anderson	6 ft 6 in (1.98 m)	185 lb (84 kg)	Sr	North Chesterfield, Virginia
G	20	Jordan Leaks	6 ft 3 in (1.91 m)	170 lb (77 kg)	Fr	Hampton, Virginia
G	22	Andre Bottoms	6 ft 0 in (1.83 m)	180 lb (82 kg)	Jr	Chesapeake, Virginia
G	23	Daman Tate	6 ft 5 in (1.96 m)	190 lb (86 kg)	GS	Boston, Massachusetts
F	24	Chris Fields Jr.	6 ft 7 in (2.01 m)	240 lb (109 kg)	Fr	Petersburg, Virginia
F	25	Nyzaiah Chambers	6 ft 7 in (2.01 m)	230 lb (104 kg)	Sr	Chesapeake, Virginia
F	33	Jack Doumbia	6 ft 6 in (1.98 m)	210 lb (95 kg)	Jr	Lanham, Maryland

Head coach

- Robert Jones (SUNY New Paltz)

Assistant coach(es)

- Jamal Brown (South Carolina State)
- C.J. Clemons (Norfolk State)
- Leonard Fairley (Norfolk State)

Legend

- (C) Team captain
- (S) Suspended
- (I) Ineligible
- (W) Walk-on
- Injured
- Current redshirt

Roster
Last update: November 17, 2023

== Schedule and results ==
Date time, TV	Rank^{#}	Opponent^{#}	Result	Record	High points	High rebounds	High assists	Site (attendance) city, state
Regular season
November 6, 2023*; 7:00 p.m.		Penn State Wilkes-Barre	W 102–55	1–0	20 – Thomas	7 – Tied	7 – Brown	Joseph G. Echols Memorial Hall (1,952); Norfolk, VA
November 9, 2023*; 7:00 p.m.		Newport News Apprentice	W 90–56	2–0	12 – Tied	7 – Darden	4 – Brown	Joseph G. Echols Memorial Hall (2,112); Norfolk, VA
November 13, 2023*; 7:00 p.m.		Hampton; Battle of the Bay	W 75–68	3–0	20 – Thomas	9 – Darden	3 – Thomas	Joseph G. Echols Memorial Hall (4,500); Norfolk, VA
November 17, 2023*; 1:00 p.m., ESPN+		vs. Fordham; Paradise Jam Quarerfinal	L 64–77	3–1	11 – Tied	11 – Darden	3 – Thomas	Sports and Fitness Center; Saint Thomas, USVI
November 18, 2023*; 3:15 p.m., ESPN+		vs. San Jose State; Paradise Jam Consolation Semifinal	L 53–77	3–2	15 – Thomas	5 – Chambers	3 – Thomas	Sports and Fitness Center; Saint Thomas, USVI
November 20, 2023*; 2:00 p.m., ESPN+		vs. Florida Gulf Coast; Paradise Jam Seventh Place	W 69–66	4–2	27 – Thomas	8 – Darden	3 – Thomas	Sports and Fitness Center; Saint Thomas, USVI
November 25, 2023*; 7:00 p.m., ESPN+		at Wichita State	L 67–80	4–3	17 – Thomas	7 – Darden	5 – Thomas	Charles Koch Arena (4,780); Wichita, KS
November 28, 2023*; 7:00 p.m., HBCU+		William & Mary	W 96–62	5–3	23 – Thomas	7 – Bladen	9 – Thomas	Joseph G. Echols Memorial Hall (1,079); Norfolk, VA
December 1, 2023*; 7:00 p.m., ESPN+		at VCU	W 63–60	6–3	17 – Tied	6 – Darden	5 – Thomas	Siegel Center; Richmond, VA
December 9, 2023*; 7:00 p.m., ESPN+		at Illinois State; Return to Horton	W 64–58	7–3	31 – Thomas	7 – Mading	4 – Thomas	Horton Field House (3,788); Normal, IL
December 13, 2023*; 6:30 pm, FloHoops		at Stony Brook	L 78–84	7–4	28 – Thomas	4 – Tied	5 – Ings	Island Federal Credit Union Arena (1,812); Stony Brook, NY
December 16, 2023*; 2:00 p.m., FloHoops		at Hofstra	L 58–74	7–5	17 – Thomas	6 – Thomas	7 – Thomas	Mack Sports Complex (1,969); Hempstead, NY
December 18, 2023*; 7:00 p.m., HBCU+		Southern Virginia	W 108–52	8–5	16 – Beale Jr.	9 – Mading	5 – Tied	Joseph G. Echols Memorial Hall (887); Norfolk, VA
December 20, 2023*; 9:00 p.m.		at UTEP; Sun Bowl Invitational Semifinal	L 65–67	8–6	18 – Betrand	6 – Betrand	3 – Thomas	Don Haskins Center (4,193); El Paso, TX
December 21, 2023*; 7:00 p.m.		vs. South Dakota State; Sun Bowl Invitational Consolation	W 84–65	9–6	17 – Doumbia	9 – Bladen	5 – Thomas	Don Haskins Center; El Paso, TX
January 2, 2024*; 7:00 p.m., SECN		at No. 5 Tennessee	L 50–87	9–7	15 – Thomas	6 – Bladen	1 – Ings	Thompson–Boling Arena (16,858); Knoxville, TN
January 6, 2024; 4:00 p.m.		at South Carolina State	W 79–72	10–7 (1–0)	16 – Thomas	5 – Tied	4 – Tied	SHM Memorial Center (135); Orangeburg, SC
January 8, 2024; 7:30 p.m.		at North Carolina Central	L 58–60	10–8 (1–1)	18 – Thomas	12 – Chambers	3 – Tied	McDougald–McLendon Arena (2,162); Durham, NC
January 15, 2024*; 7:00 p.m., HBCU+		VUL	W 118–73	11–8	31 – Fields Jr.	13 – Chambers	7 – Ings	Joseph G. Echols Memorial Hall (1,263); Norfolk, VA
January 20, 2024; 4:00 p.m.		at Howard	W 65–61	12–8 (2–1)	14 – Tied	5 – Fields Jr.	3 – Thomas	Burr Gymnasium (1,943); Washington, D.C.
January 27, 2024; 4:00 p.m., HBCU+		Coppin State	W 68–58	13–8 (3–1)	19 – Fields Jr.	6 – Tied	3 – Tied	Joseph G. Echols Memorial Hall (2,567); Norfolk, VA
January 29, 2024; 7:30 p.m., HBCU+		Morgan State	W 83–73	14–8 (4–1)	17 – Bladen	7 – Kuluel	5 – Tied	Joseph G. Echols Memorial Hall (3,013); Norfolk, VA
February 3, 2024; 4:00 p.m., HBCU+		Delaware State	W 65–64	15–8 (5–1)	25 – Thomas	7 – Mading	3 – Tied	Joseph G. Echols Memorial Hall (3,421); Norfolk, VA
February 5, 2024; 8:00 p.m.		at Maryland Eastern Shore	L 60–69	15–9 (5–2)	16 – Tied	7 – Jenkins	3 – Thomas	Hytche Athletic Center (183); Princess Anne, MD
February 17, 2024; 4:00 p.m., HBCU+		South Carolina State	W 71–67 ^{OT}	16–9 (6–2)	18 – Thomas	5 – Fields Jr.	3 – Jenkins	Joseph G. Echols Memorial Hall (3,367); Norfolk, VA
February 19, 2024; 7:30 p.m., HBCU+		North Carolina Central	W 80–74	17–9 (7–2)	28 – Thomas	6 – Thomas	5 – Thomas	Joseph G. Echols Memorial Hall (3,525); Norfolk, VA
February 24, 2024; 4:00 p.m.		at Coppin State	W 68–66	18–9 (8–2)	21 – Jenkins	3 – Tied	5 – Thomas	Physical Education Complex (2,100); Baltimore, MD
February 26, 2024; 7:30 p.m.		at Morgan State	W 85–82	19–9 (9–2)	20 – Thomas	5 – Thomas	4 – Tied	Talmadge L. Hill Field House (3,238); Baltimore, MD
March 2, 2024; 4:00 p.m.		at Delaware State	L 71–85	19–10 (9–3)	15 – Betrand	6 – Tied	5 – Thomas	Memorial Hall (1,200); Dover, DE
March 4, 2024; 7:30 p.m., HBCU+		Maryland Eastern Shore	W 69–50	20–10 (10–3)	21 – Thomas	6 – Darden	3 – Thomas	Joseph G. Echols Memorial Hall (1,881); Norfolk, VA
March 7, 2024; 9:00 p.m., ESPNU		Howard	W 77–58	21–10 (11–3)	16 – Thomas	9 – Darden	6 – Darden	Joseph G. Echols Memorial Hall (4,176); Norfolk, VA
MEAC tournament
March 13, 2024; 6:00 p.m., ESPN+	(1)	vs. (8) Coppin State; Quarterfinal	W 75–51	22–10	17 – Ings	9 – Mading	3 – Thomas	Norfolk Scope; Norfolk, VA
March 15, 2024; 6:00 p.m., ESPN+	(1)	vs. (4) Howard; Semifinal	L 74–80	22–11	16 – Betrand	5 – Fields Jr.	5 – Ings	Norfolk Scope; Norfolk, VA
CIT
March 23, 2024; 4:00 p.m., ESPN+		Alabama A&M; Semifinal (John McLendon Classic)	W 81–66	23–11	16 – Betrand	8 – Tied	8 – Darden	Joseph G. Echols Memorial Hall (1,522); Norfolk, VA
March 27, 2024; 7:00 p.m., ESPN+		Purdue Fort Wayne; Final	W 75–67	24–11	17 – Ings	7 – Fields Jr.	5 – Thomas	Joseph G. Echols Memorial Hall (1,576); Norfolk, VA
*Non-conference game. ^{#}Rankings from AP Poll. (#) Tournament seedings in parentheses. All times are in Eastern.
