= 2024 CollegeInsider.com Postseason Tournament =

Postseason single-elimination tournament of NCAA Division I basketball teams

- Season: 2023–24
- Teams: 16 planned 9 accepted
- Finals site: Joseph G. Echols Memorial Hall; Norfolk, Virginia
- Champions: Norfolk State (1st title)
- Runner-up: Purdue Fort Wayne (1st title game)
- Semifinalists: Alabama A&M (1st semifinal); Tarleton State (1st semifinal)
- Winning coach: Robert Jones (1st title)
- MVP: Christian Ings (Norfolk State)
- Attendance: 11,006 (average: 1,376 per game)

The 2024 CollegeInsider.com Postseason Tournament (CIT) was a postseason single-elimination tournament of NCAA Division I basketball teams. This was the first CIT contested since 2019. The 2020 and 2021 CITs were cancelled due to the COVID-19 pandemic. In 2022, the CIT was replaced by The Basketball Classic. Neither The Basketball Classic nor the CIT were contested in 2023. However, CollegeInsider.com announced in early March 2024, that the CIT was to be revived in a 16-team pod-based format for the 2023–24 postseason. Ultimately, only nine teams agreed to play in the 2024 edition.

Four classics were contested during the tournament, each named in honor of a legendary college basketball coach: Hugh Durham, Lou Henson, John McLendon and Jim Phelan. The winner of each classic was awarded a trophy, and a classic most valuable player was named.

Norfolk State won their first-ever CIT title, defeating Purdue Fort Wayne, 75–67, after overcoming an 18-point deficit.

== Participating teams ==
The teams listed below accepted an invitation to the 2024 CIT.

Note: Team records are before playing in the tournament.

Team	Conference	Record	Appearance	Last bid
Abilene Christian	WAC	15–17	2nd	2018
Alabama A&M	SWAC	11–22	1st	–
Austin Peay	ASUN	19–15	3rd	2018
Bowling Green	MAC	20–13	3rd	2015
Norfolk State	MEAC	22–11	5th	2017
Purdue Fort Wayne	Horizon	21–12	5th	2018
Tarleton State	WAC	23–9	1st	–
Texas A&M–Corpus Christi	Southland	21–11	5th	2017
Texas Southern	SWAC	16–16	2nd	2019

Although the initial announcement that the tournament would be contested stated that all the teams would be seeded, no seeds were assigned to teams on the published schedule. However, Norfolk State indicated they were the no. 1 seed, and they received a bye to the semifinals and hosted both games in which they played.

== Schedule ==
Session	Game	Date	Time*	Matchup	Score	Television	Attendance	Ref.
Lou Henson Classic
1	1	March 19	7:00 pm	Texas Southern at Tarleton State	71–82	ESPN+	1,426	
1	2	March 19	9:00 pm	Abilene Christian vs. Texas A&M–Corpus Christi	73–63	ESPN+	615	
2	3	March 20	7:00 pm	Abilene Christian at Tarleton State	59–86	ESPN+	1,576	
Jim Phelan Classic
3	4	March 20	7:00 pm	Purdue Fort Wayne at Bowling Green	77–75	ESPN+	1,219	
Hugh Durham Classic
4	5	March 20	8:00 pm	Alabama A&M at Austin Peay	81–71	ESPN+	1,386	
John McLendon Classic (CIT Semifinal)
5	6	March 23	4:00 pm	Alabama A&M at Norfolk State	81–66	Spartan Showcase	1,522	
Semifinal
6	7	March 25	7:00 pm	Purdue Fort Wayne at Tarleton State	73–72	ESPN+	1,686	
Championship
7	8	March 27	7:00 pm	Purdue Fort Wayne at Norfolk State	67–75	Spartan Showcase	1,576	
*Game times in EDT (UTC−4).

== Bracket ==
First Round; March 19
Tarleton State	82
Texas Southern	71
Texas A&M–Corpus Christi	63
Abilene Christian	73

Quarterfinals; March 20
Austin Peay	71
Alabama A&M	81
Tarleton State	86
Abilene Christian	59
Bowling Green	75
Purdue Fort Wayne	77

Semifinals; March 23–25
Norfolk State	81
Alabama A&M	66
Tarleton State	72
Purdue Fort Wayne	73

Final; March 27
Norfolk State	75
Purdue Fort Wayne	67

== Game summaries ==
All times are in Eastern Daylight Time (UTC-4)

=== First round ===
ESPN+

March 19
7:00 p.m.

Box

Texas Southern 71, Tarleton State 82
Scoring by half: 26–36, 45–46
Pts: Stroud, Wysinger 18; Rebs: Cisse 8 Asts: Cisse 6	Pts: Williams 21; Rebs: Gaddy 10; Asts: Moussa 6
Tarleton State advances to CIT quarterfinals

Wisdom Gymnasium
Stephenville, Texas
Attendance: 1,426
Referees: Robert Bissant, Wes Ford, Randal Anders

ESPN+

March 19
9:00 p.m.

Box

Abilene Christian 73, Texas A&M–Corpus Christi 63
Scoring by half: 36–33, 37–30
Pts: DeGruy 16; Rebs: Bettiol 10; Asts: Steele 4	Pts: Roberts 22; Rebs: Dease 10; Asts: Humphrey 4
Abilene Christian advances to CIT quarterfinals

Wisdom Gymnasium
Stephenville, Texas
Attendance: 615
Referees: Joe Wilbert, Tommy Johnson, Jon Stigliano

=== Quarterfinals ===
ESPN+

March 20
7:00 p.m.

Box

Abilene Christian 59, Tarleton State 86
Scoring by half: 25–37, 34–49
Pts: Bettiol 14; Rebs: Bettiol 8 Asts: Madden 3	Pts: Gaddy 16; Rebs: Innocenti 8 Asts: Innocenti 6
Tarleton State wins Lou Henson Classic and advances to CIT semifinals

Wisdom Gymnasium
Stephenville, Texas
Attendance: 1,576
Referees: Wes Ford, Randal Anders, Tommy Johnson

ESPN+

March 20
7:00 p.m.

Box

Purdue Fort Wayne 77, Bowling Green 75
Scoring by half: 43–31, 34–44
Pts: Jackson 18; Rebs: Mulder 8 Asts: Bello 5	Pts: Hill 26; Rebs: Spurgin 8 Asts: Spurgin 5
Purdue Fort Wayne wins Jim Phelan Classic and advances to CIT semifinals

Stroh Center
Bowling Green, Ohio
Attendance: 1,219
Referees: Tariq Lucas, Scott Siville, Tim Stewart

ESPN+

March 20
8:00 p.m.

Box

Alabama A&M 81, Austin Peay 71
Scoring by half: 42–31, 39–40
Pts: Moodie 24; Rebs: Tucker 13; Asts: Tucker 4	Pts: Jones 21; Rebs: Witt 7 Asts: Jones 4
Alabama A&M wins Hugh Durham Classic and advances to CIT semifinals

F&M Bank Arena
Clarksville, Tennessee
Attendance: 1,386
Referees: James Gibson, Joshua Pitto, Kevin Driver

=== Semifinals ===
Spartan Showcase (stream)

March 23
4:00 p.m.

Box

Alabama A&M 66, Norfolk State 81
Scoring by half: 31–28, 35–53
Pts: Downey, Riley 15; Rebs: Blackwell 6 Asts: Tucker 6	Pts: Betrand 16; Rebs: Darden, Fields 8 Asts: Darden 8
Norfolk State wins John McLendon Classic and advances to CIT final

Joseph G. Echols Memorial Hall
Norfolk, Virginia
Attendance: 1,522
Referees: Scott Arbogast, Christopher Bennett, Tony Dawkins

ESPN+

March 25
7:00 p.m.

Box

Purdue Fort Wayne 73, Tarleton State 72
Scoring by half: 36–41, 37–31
Pts: Bello 21; Rebs: Mulder 15; Asts: Jackson 4	Pts: Moussa 16; Rebs: Smith 7 Asts: Moussa 4
Purdue Fort Wayne advances to CIT final

Wisdom Gymnasium
Stephenville, Texas
Attendance: 1,686
Referees: Randal Anders, Jon Stigliano, Tommy Johnson

=== Final ===
Spartan Showcase (stream)

March 27
7:00 p.m.

Box

Purdue Fort Wayne 67, Norfolk State 75
Scoring by half: 41–31, 26–44
Pts: Roberts 18; Rebs: Roberts 8 Asts: Bello 8	Pts: Ings 17; Rebs: Fields 7 Asts: Thomas 5
Norfolk State wins CIT championship

Joseph G. Echols Memorial Hall
Norfolk, Virginia
Attendance: 1,576
Referees: Steven Perry Jr., Kendall B. Ridley, Antoine Dawkins

== Awards ==
The CIT presented the awards shown below.

Award	Recipient	School
CIT MVP	Christian Ings	Norfolk State
Lou Henson Classic MVP	KiAndre Gaddy	Tarleton State
Jim Phelan Classic MVP	Jalen Jackson	Purdue Fort Wayne
Hugh Durham Classic MVP	Chad Moodie	Alabama A&M
John McLendon Classic MVP	Daryl Anderson	Norfolk State
