= Waterford Hill (Michigan) =

Hill

- Location within Michigan

Highest point
- Elevation: 1,150 ft (350 m)
- Coordinates: 42°42′40″N 83°24′40″W

Geography
- Topo map(s): USGS 7.5' topographic map Waterford Hill, Independence Township, Michigan

Geology
- Mountain type: Summit

Waterford Hill is located in Independence Township, in Oakland County, Michigan, 0.4 miles north of Waterford Village. The hill is classified as a summit. It extends from east of Dixie Highway including Ottawa Park Cemetery to the east, to Maple Lane in Moon Valley to the north, to Parview Drive and Greens Lake to the west, to Van Norman Lake to the south.

Waterford Hill's elevation is 1,150 feet, making it the second highest point in Independence Township. Three miles away is Pine Knob, the highest point in the township at 1,201 feet.

== Formation ==
Waterford Hill, along with the other hills in the Great Lakes region, was formed during the retreat of the last continental glacier, approximately 14,000 years ago. As they retreated, the glaciers left behind debris, called moraines. The retreating glaciers also formed more than thirty lakes in the township.

== History ==
The first settler to purchase and settle land in Independence Township was John Wheeler Beardslee (1799–1883), who came to Michigan from Sussex County, New Jersey and purchased his tract of land in section 35 in 1826. He settled on it five years later in 1831.

By 1834, nearly every section in the southern half of Independence Township had been purchased, including sections 32 and 33. Those sections comprised the area later called Waterford Hill.

The sections of land comprising Waterford Hill had several different owners throughout the years. Among those property owners was Stephen Moon (1823–1909) who, from 1854 until his death, owned 120 acres on the north side of Waterford Hill in section 32. The area comprising his farm is named Moon Valley for him.

In the 1870s, Moses Beardslee (1823–1890) owned a 162-acre apple farm in section 32 on the southern and western side of Waterford Hill. He also owned and operated a cider mill there.

Jeremiah Ganong (1803–1891) owned 155 acres in section 33 on the eastern end of Waterford Hill. Ganong died from smoke inhalation from a fire in the Waterford Exchange Hotel in the village of Waterford.

From 1886 to 1912, Zenas Van Norman (1822–1917) owned much of the property along the southern side of Waterford Hill. The Mill Pond along that side of Waterford Hill was renamed for his family; Van Norman Lake.

In the 1940s and 1950s, Ernest W. Seaholm (1887–1980) owned 135 acres on the southern side of Waterford Hill. Seaholm, a Cadillac automotive executive and the president of the Birmingham, Michigan school district, was responsible for the planting of the pine trees that today cover the hill. Birmingham Seaholm High School is named for Ernest Seaholm. Seaholm never lived on Waterford Hill.

== Development ==
Waterford Hill was home to two fruit tree farms prior to the hill being developed in 1956. That year, Samuel W. Leib bought most of the southern side of the hill and, along with Donald E. White, developed the property, calling the new subdivision Waterford Hill Manor.

Phase one of the development saw the building of residential streets; Balmoral Terrace, Bergate Lane, Brandeis Circle, Curtis Lane, Georgetown Court, Olympus Circle, Waterford Hill Terrace, and Wellesley Terrace

Olympus Circle, atop Waterford Hill, is the highest elevation of any residential street in Independence Township.

In 1969, phase two of the residential development saw more streets constructed. The extension of Balmoral Terrace from Curtis Lane to Parview Drive, the extension of Wellesley Terrace from Curtis Lane to Parview Drive, the extension of Curtis Lane from Wellesley Terrace to Andersonville Road, and the addition of Leib Court off of Wellesley Terrace and Eddystone Circle off of Curtis Lane allowed for more homes to be built.

As of 2013, there were 265 homes in Waterford Hill Manor and 609 residents as of 2016.

In 1987, another development began on the northern side of Waterford Hill on Suicide Hill, Middle Hill, and Three Layer Hill. Streets were built and named Ridgeview Dr. (off Dixie Hwy), Timberway Trail (off of Ridgeway Trail), and Scenic Pines Court (off of Timberway Trail). Condominiums were built on the development and were called Clarkston Bluffs.

== Lakes ==
The Clinton River winds its way downstream around Waterford Hill and through the four lakes that surround the hill; Greens Lake (117 acres, 55 foot depth), Lester Lake (12 acres, 25 foot depth), Van Norman Lake (66 acres, 90 foot depth), and Townsend Lake (26 acres, 55 foot depth).

Greens Lake was named for John Green (1794–1851) who owned a 200-acre farm along the eastern shore of the lake.

Lester Lake was named for William Lester, an early Oakland County settler.

Van Norman Lake was named for Zenas Harvey Van Norman, who owned the property along the entire northern shore of the lake from 1886 to 1916.

Townsend Lake was named for Townsend Carpenter Beardslee. The son of John W. Beardslee (the first settler in Independence Township), Townsend was the first white child born in the township.

== Notable people ==
- Kirk Gibson, former MLB player, and 1988 National League MVP, lived on Curtis Lane.
- Ryan Riess, professional poker player, and 2013 World Series of Poker champion, lived on Parview Drive.
