= Deer Lake (Independence Township, Michigan) =

Lake in the state of Michigan, United States

- Location within Michigan
- Location: Oakland County, Michigan
- Coordinates: 42°43′57″N 83°25′54″W
- Type: Lake
- Basin countries: United States
- Surface area: 137 acres (55 ha)
- Max. depth: 63 ft (19 m)
- Surface elevation: 961 ft (293 m)
- Settlements: Independence Township

Deer Lake is an all-sports, 137-acre (55 ha) lake along the main branch of the Clinton River. The lake, with a maximum depth of 63 feet (19 m), lies within Independence Township in Oakland County, Michigan.

Deer Lake is one of the first lakes the Clinton River flows through; it is the first lake in Independence Township, after the river rises in Springfield Township.

The Clinton River enters Deer Lake on the north end just after it passes under I-75. It exits on the south end where it enters into Middle Lake (23 acres (9.3 ha)), then into tiny Dollar Lake and then, as it crosses under Dixie Highway, into Greens Lake.

Deer Lake connects on its northeast side to 5-acre (2.0 ha) Dark Lake.

== Depot ==
In 1851, the Detroit, Grand Haven and Milwaukee Railway came through Independence Township and a train depot was built in Clarkston. The Clarkston depot was 35.23 miles (56.70 km) from Detroit and 153.08 miles (246.36 km) from Grand Haven, Michigan. The railroad helped make the lakes of the area, including Deer Lake, easily accessible to summer vacationers from the big cities.

The Clarkston depot, along with the Waterford depot, the Drayton Plains depot and the Windiate depot served to make Independence Township and Waterford Township a resort area.

The original depot at Clarkston, built in 1851, burned down around 1890. A "witch's hat" depot was then built to replace it; however, it burned down in 1923. A third depot was built to replace it; this depot ceased operation in 1959.

Since 1962, the depot has been used as a theater by the Clarkston Village Players, a local community theatre organization.

== Resort ==
The Deer Lake Inn Hotel was a summer resort for vacationers from Detroit and Lansing. The resort was easily accessed by four trains a day during the summer months from the 1890s to the 1940s and was located on Deer Lake near the Clarkston depot. It featured boating, fishing, sailing, sunbathing and tennis.

== Public access ==
Deer Lake has a public beach for township residents on the south shore off of White Lake Road in Clarkston. There is also a boat launch at the beach.
