= Parke Lake (Independence Township, Michigan) =

Lake in the state of Michigan, United States

Park Lake
- Location within Michigan Location within the United States
- Location: Oakland County, Michigan
- Coordinates: 42°44′19″N 83°24′54″W
- Type: Lake
- Basin countries: United States
- Surface elevation: 988 ft (301 m)
- Settlements: Independence Township

Parke Lake is a lake at an elevation of 988 feet (301 m), located in Clarkston within Independence Township in Oakland County, Michigan, USA.

Dollar Lake connects downstream with the 23-acre (9.3 ha) Middle Lake.

== Fish ==
Parke Lake fish include bass and bluegill.
