= Whipple Lake (Independence Township, Michigan) =

Lake in Oakland County, Michigan, United States

- Location within Michigan
- Location: Oakland County, Michigan
- Coordinates: 42.779198°N 83.377716°W
- Basin countries: United States
- Surface area: 75 acres (30 ha)
- Max. depth: 50 ft (15 m)
- Surface elevation: 293 meters (961 feet)
- Settlements: Independence Township

Whipple Lake is an all-sports, 75-acre lake along the Clinton River. The lake lies entirely within Independence Township in Oakland County, Michigan.

Whipple Lake is located east of Independence Oaks County Park, west of Pine Knob Road, north of Stickney Road, and south of Oak Hill Road.

Whipple Lake Road is east of the lake.

Whipple Lake connects downstream to 30-acre Crooked Lake and to seven-acre Dark Lake to the northeast.
