= Greens Lake (Michigan) =

Lake in the state of Michigan, United States

- Location within Michigan Location within the United States
- Location: Oakland County, Michigan
- Coordinates: 42°42′53″N 83°25′25″W
- Type: Lake
- Basin countries: United States
- Surface area: 117 acres (47 ha)
- Max. depth: 55 ft (17 m)
- Surface elevation: 961 ft (293 m)
- Settlements: Independence Township

Greens Lake is a private, all-sports, 117-acre (47 ha) lake along the main branch of the Clinton River. The lake lies within Independence Township in Oakland County, Michigan.

The lake has a maximum depth of 55 feet (17 m).

Greens Lake connects to Lester Lake and Van Norman Lake to the south and Dollar Lake, Middle Lake and Deer Lake to the north.

== Namesake ==
Greens Lake was named for the Green Family who owned a 200-acre (81 ha) farm along the eastern shore of the lake.

In 1832, John Green (b.1794-d.1851), along with his wife Elinor (b.1802-d.1883) and their ten children settled on sections 28 and 29 in Independence Township, Michigan from their Warren County, New Jersey home.

After John Green's death in 1851, his son, Daniel Green (b. 1828, d. 1918), along with Daniel's wife Julia (b. 1826, d. 1914) took over the family farm in sections 29 and 32 on Waterford Hill in Independence Township.

The farm was located along the lake that was originally called Green's Lake but over time was called Greens Lake, without the apostrophe.

== Bay Court Park ==
On the south shore of Greens Lake is Bay Court Park. The Independence Township park features a sandy beach, a playscape, a 9-hole disc golf course, picnic pavilions, a banquet/meeting facility, and a gazebo. Prior to Bay Court Park becoming an Independence Township park, it was a camp. The Boy Scouts camped at Camp Brady on Greens Lake and across the street (Andersonville Road) on Lester Lake from 1921 through 1946.

In 1946, the camp was sold to the United Way and was used as a camp for mothers and children through 1972. It was also used by the Detroit Public Schools for underprivileged children.

The camp was sold in 1988 to Independence Township.
