= Clarkston High School (Michigan) =

Public high school in Michigan, US

Location
- 6093 Flemings Lake Rd; Clarkston, Michigan 48346; United States; 42°44′21″N 83°23′34″W

Information
- Type: Public high school
- Established: 1999 (Current Site)
- School district: Clarkston Community Schools
- Superintendent: Dr. Shawn P. Ryan
- CEEB code: 230630
- NCES School ID: 260990004475
- Principal: Gary Kaul
- Teaching staff: 78.90 (on an FTE basis)
- Grades: 10-12
- Enrollment: 1,560 (2023-2024)
- Student to teacher ratio: 19.77
- Campus: Suburban
- Colors: Blue and gold
- Athletics conference: Oakland Activities Association
- Nickname: Wolves
- Newspaper: Paw Prints
- Yearbook: Hilltopper
- Feeder schools: Clarkston Jr High School
- Website: chs.clarkston.k12.mi.us

Student assessments
- 2021–22 school year Change vs. prior year

M-STEP 11th grade proficiency rates (Science / Social Studies)
- Advanced %: 15.4 / 9.4
- Proficient %: 22.0 / 24.7
- PR. Proficient %: 14.6 / 44.0
- Not Proficient %: 48.0 / 21.9

Average test scores
- SAT Total: 1041.8 (▼ −13.5)

Clarkston High School is a public high school located in Independence Township, Michigan. It is the only high school in the Clarkston Community Schools school district.

== History ==
Clarkston High School used to be in Clarkston, Michigan. The third Clarkston School was built in 1910 on Main Street (M-15).

By the time the fourth Clarkston School was completed in 1930 in Independence Township, the area's population had started to decline. After World War II, Independence Township's population began to boom. In 1952, Clarkston Community Schools was formed and Clarkston and Andersonville Elementary Schools were completed, leaving the 6th-to-12th graders as sole occupants at the newly renamed Clarkston High School. Expansions were made in the mid-1950s. By the end of the decade the building could not be expanded anymore, and in 1960, the fifth Clarkston High School was built across the street (although its official address was 6595 Middle Lake Road). The 1930 building became Clarkston Junior High.

The 1960 building remained unchanged until major renovations were made in 1993 when freshmen were allowed to attend the school for the first time since 1969. Unfortunately the renovations were not enough to handle nearly 2,000 students, and in 1998 the current building was opened. The 1960 building would be refitted as Clarkston Middle School until 2005, when it underwent renovations and became Clarkston Junior High, which hosts grades eight and nine. That same year, Sashabaw Middle School, which hosted students from the eastern half of the district, was renovated and now holds only grades six and seven.

In November 2022, a school bond proposal of around $197,500,000 USD was approved for district-wide improvements. This included improvements of security systems, a new junior high and a replacement of an aging building system. As of 2024, the new junior high school plans are still being reviewed and work has not started.

== Athletics ==
CHS offers 26 varsity sports, and competes in the Oakland Activities Association or "OAA". At the state level, the school is classified as "Class A" or "Division 1" of the Michigan High School Athletic Association, competing against those schools with the largest enrollments.

The "Wolves" (or Lady Wolves) name is used by most athletic teams at the secondary education level. The chief rival to Clarkston is the Lake Orion High School Dragons, located in Orion Township, Michigan.

Clarkston Wolves won the Division 1 Football State Championship in 2013. Clarkston repeated as Division 1 Football State Champions the next year in 2014. The Wolves also won the 2017 MHSAA Football state championship for their third football state championship in five years. That same year, the Wolves basketball team won their first Class A State Championship under head coach Dan Fife. In 2018, the Wolves repeated as State Champions with an 81-38 victory over Holland West Ottawa. The leading scorer of that game, Foster Loyer, won the 2018 Hal Schram Mr. Basketball Award. Dan Fife retired later that year as the third-winningest head coach in state history after 36 seasons, with a career coaching record of 703-170.

=== Sports offered ===
- Baseball
- Boys Basketball
- Girls Basketball
- Boys Lacrosse
- Boys Bowling
- Girls Bowling
- Competitive Cheer
- Competitive Dance
- Football
- Girls Field Hockey
- Boys Golf
- Girls Golf
- Girls Lacrosse
- Boys Ice Hockey
- Softball
- Boys Skiing
- Boys Soccer
- Girls Soccer
- Boys Swimming and Diving
- Girls Swimming and Diving
- Pickleball
- Boys Tennis
- Girls Tennis
- Boys Track and Field
- Girls Track and Field
- Girls Volleyball
- Boys Volleyball
- Wrestling
- Boys Cross Country
- Girls Cross Country

== Notable alumni ==
- Tim Birtsas, MLB pitcher
- Jordan Dasuqi, college and professional basketball player
- Dane Fife, college basketball coach
- Danny Fife, MLB pitcher
- Garrett Dellinger, NFL player
- Steve Howe, MLB pitcher
- Michael Raymond-James, actor
- Geoff Johns, comic book and television writer
- Alex Kessman, NFL player
- Tim Miller, professional hockey player
- Fletcher Loyer, basketball player
- Tony Lucca, singer/actor
- Tim McCormick, NBA player
- Tim Robinson, actor/comedian, regular on Saturday Night Live
- Rocco Spindler, college football offensive lineman for the Nebraska Cornhuskers
- Jay'viar Suggs, college football defensive tackle for the Wisconsin Badgers
