= Oakland Community College =

Public college in Oakland County, Michigan, US

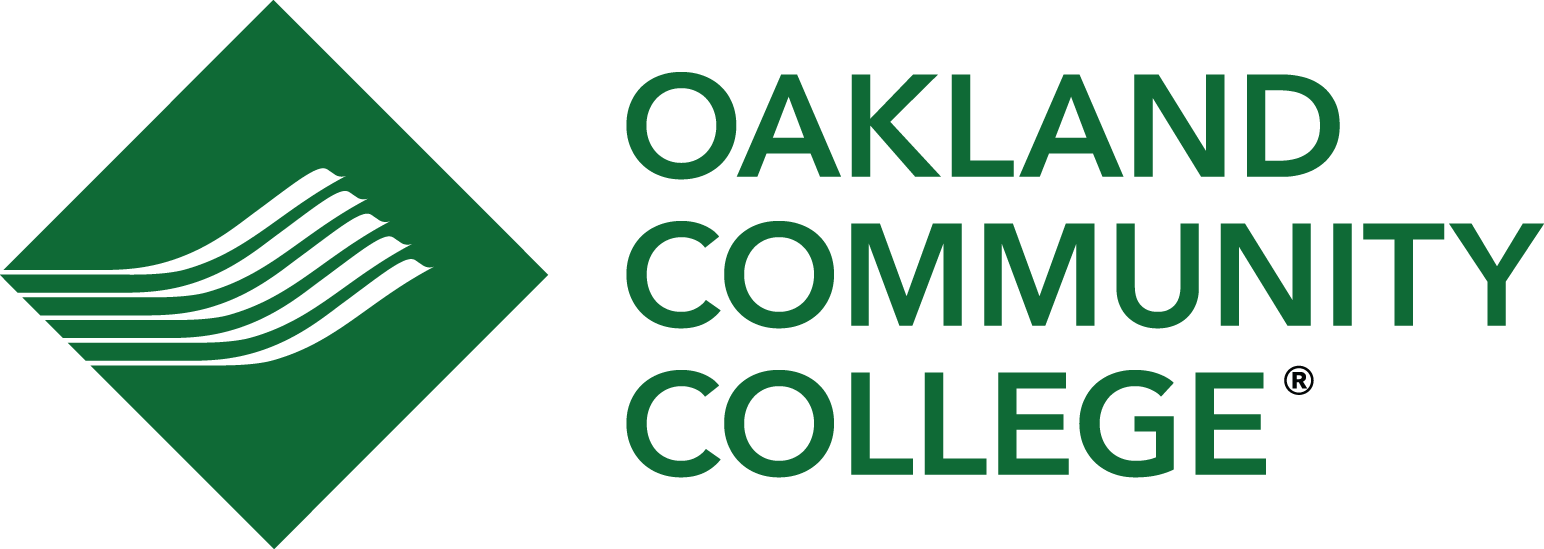
- Motto: Excellence Empowered
- Type: Public community college
- Established: 1964
- Chancellor: Peter M. Provenzano, Jr.
- Students: 14,511 (spring 2022)
- Location: Oakland County, Michigan, United States
- Campus: Suburban (Auburn Hills, Highland Lakes, Orchard Ridge, Southfield) Urban (Royal Oak)
- Colors: Green and white
- Mascot: Owl
- Website: oaklandcc.edu

Oakland Community College (OCC) is a public community college with five campuses in Oakland County, Michigan. Established in 1964, OCC is the largest community college in Michigan, with the state's third-largest undergraduate enrollment. Enrollment at the college for the spring 2022 semester was 14,511. Oakland Community College has been accredited by the Higher Learning Commission since 1971. The college offers 57 associate degree programs and 41 other academic programs.

== History ==
=== Planning and development ===
In August 1960, an advisory council, consisting of 85 citizens from Macomb, Monroe, Oakland, St. Clair, Washtenaw, and Wayne counties, published a report calling for the establishment of five community colleges across the six-county region. A similar commission of Oakland County residents echoed this need in a June 1962 report, which recommended the construction of three campuses across the county, funded by a millage. A proposed 1-mill tax appeared on the June 1963 ballot, along with referendums to establish OCC and a board of trustees; the latter two were approved by voters, but the tax to fund the college was not. The three issues appeared on ballots again a year later in June 1964, when all three were approved.

With revenue secured, the newly established Board of Trustees acquired three campus sites, and hired John Tirrell, of the St. Louis Junior College District, as OCC's first president. The first site was a disused Nike missile base in Pontiac Township (now Auburn Hills), purchased from the National Bank of Detroit for $247,000. Though the surroundings were sparsely populated, the site was chosen for its proximity to I-75 and M-59, as well as its existing barracks, which could easily be converted to house classrooms. With a similar plan, the Board then purchased a second site, the disused Oakland County Tuberculosis Sanitarium in Waterford, and promptly began renovations. Amid public concerns that the former hospital's use for classes could pose a health risk to students, Tirrell commissioned the county's health department to inspect it; once it was cleared, he famously declared that the campus would be "as safe as your living room." Renovations to both campuses were completed in time for OCC to welcome its first students in September 1965.

=== Opening ===
Following two days of orientations, classes commenced at both campuses, dubbed Auburn Hills and Highland Lakes, on September 11, 1965. 3,860 students attended OCC during its first semester, exceeding projections, and setting a record for the largest opening enrollment of any community college in the United States. That December, ground was broken on OCC's third campus, named Orchard Ridge, in Farmington Township. Designed by a consortium of Perkins & Will and Detroit-based Giffels and Rosetti, the Brutalist campus was inspired by similar colleges in California, and reportedly won a 1966 award from the American Association of Architects. The campus opened in phases from 1967 to 1968.

=== Southeast Campus System expansion ===
From OCC's inception, the campuses' locations spurred controversy: their placement in the outer suburbs to the north and west made them inaccessible to the more densely populated areas in the southeast of Oakland County. As early as 1966, plans were made to establish a fourth campus near Royal Oak.

In 1980, a new campus opened in Southfield that replaced a temporary location in Oak Park. Later, the Southeast Campus System expanded through the purchase and remodeling of buildings at a site in Royal Oak. The Royal Oak buildings were replaced by a new campus complex which opened in the fall of 1982.

== Academics ==
OCC offers nearly 100 certificate and degree programs.

== Campuses ==
Oakland Community College holds in-person classes at five campuses throughout Oakland County. OCC has also offered online classes since the early 2000s.

=== Auburn Hills ===
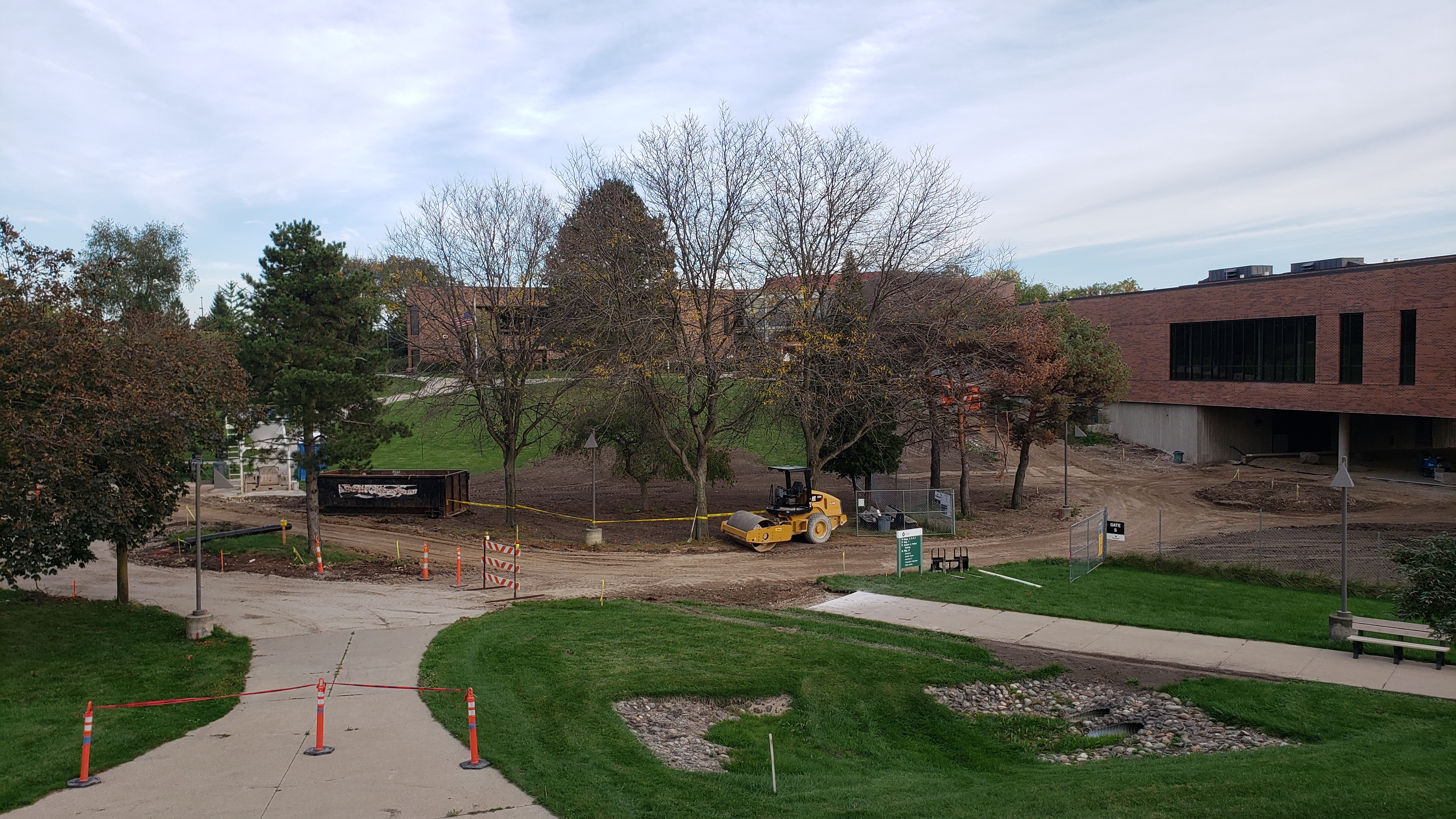
Auburn Hills Campus

The Auburn Hills campus is located off M-59 in Auburn Hills, across the road from Chrysler Headquarters and near I-75. Built on a former Army Nike missile site in then-Pontiac Township, Auburn Hills was one of the two original OCC campuses (along with Highland Lakes), opening for classes in the fall of 1965. OCC originally coined the name "Auburn Hills," fourteen years before Pontiac Township incorporated as the City of Auburn Hills.

The Auburn Hills campus is home to OCC's police academy, and the OCC Emergency Services Academy (formally Combined Regional Emergency Services Training (CREST) center.)

In 2022, a new Science & Computer Science building was developed, housing modern facilities for both the CIS department and the science programs. CIS expanded in the first floor suite showcasing the technologies within adaptable labs. The science programs moved into the second floor of the wing.

=== Highland Lakes ===
The Highland Lakes campus is located at Cooley Lake and Hospital Roads on the south edge of Waterford Township. It opened in the fall of 1965 in the former Oakland County Sanitarium, a tuberculosis hospital constructed in 1927. Additional buildings were added to the campus in the early 1980s, and two were expanded in the mid-2000s. The original building, then known as Highland Hall, was demolished in 2013.

Highland Lakes is slated to close in the fall of 2025 as part of OCC's restructuring plan.

=== Orchard Ridge ===
The Orchard Ridge campus is located along I-696 between Orchard Lake and Farmington Roads in Farmington Hills. It opened in the fall of 1967. The Brutalist campus was designed by architect Philip Will Jr., known for his partnership in the firm Perkins & Will.

OCC's award-winning culinary program is housed at the Orchard Ridge campus, with three restaurants open to the public on certain days. Orchard Ridge is also home to Oakland Early College, an early college high school operated by the West Bloomfield School District. A radio station, WORB, operated at Orchard Ridge until 1999.

=== Royal Oak ===
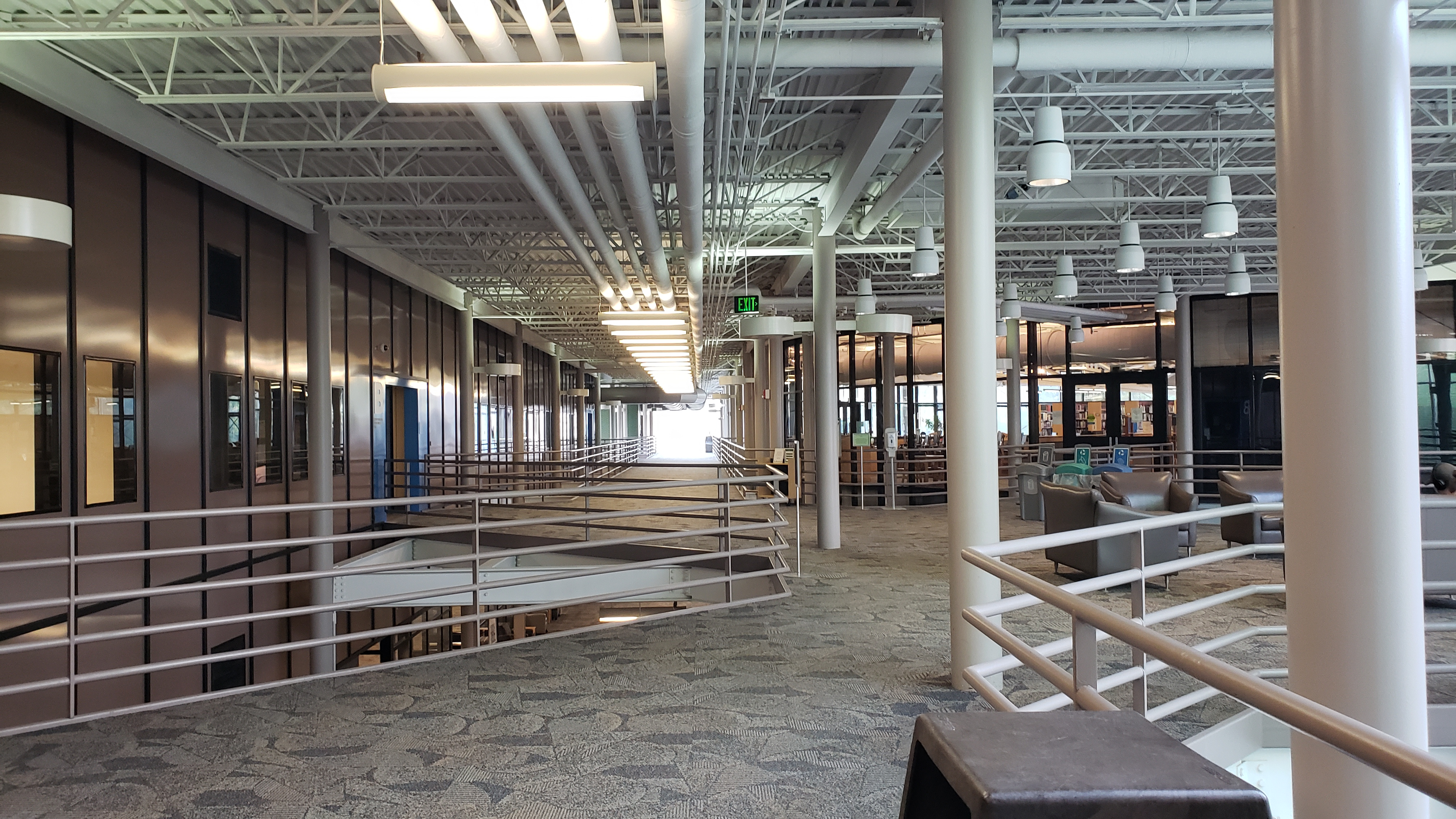
Royal Oak Campus

OCC's current Royal Oak campus opened in 1982, and consists of a single large building in downtown Royal Oak, bordered by Main Street, Washington Avenue, 7th Street, and Lincoln Avenue. It is served by two parking garages across the street.

=== Southfield ===
OCC's Southfield campus is located along the Lodge Freeway (M-10) half a mile north of the Detroit/Wayne County border, near the former Northland Center. The Southfield campus opened in 1980, replacing a site in nearby Oak Park. It consists of one large building, doubled in size by a late-2000s expansion.

=== Pontiac Center ===
OCC previously had operations at 17 S Saginaw Street in downtown Pontiac. The Pontiac Center closed in 2015.

== Student life ==
The OCC athletic teams were previously known as the Raiders, but starting February 2024 they became the Owls. They compete in the National Junior College Athletic Association (NJCAA) and the Michigan Community College Athletic Association (MCCAA). Men's varsity sports include basketball, cross-country, and golf; women's varsity sports include basketball, cross-country, and softball. OCC also has a competitive speech and performance team (the forensics team) that has had both State and National champions.

== Governance ==
OCC is governed by a seven-member board of trustees elected by the voters of Oakland County to eight-year terms.

=== Chief executives ===
==== Presidents ====
- John Tirrell (1964–68)
- Joseph Hill (1968–78)
- Robert Roelofs (1978–85)

==== Chancellors ====
- R. Stephen Nicholson (1985–90)
- Patsy Fulton-Calkins (1991–95)
- Richard Thompson (1996-2003)
- Mary Spangler (2003-2007)
- Timothy Meyer (2008-2017)
- Peter Provenzano (2017–present)

== Notable alumni ==
- Andrew J. Feustel – geophysicist and NASA astronaut
- Pam Dawber – actress, Mork & Mindy
- Myles Jury – wrestler and professional mixed martial arts fighter
- Tomo Miličević – lead guitarist of rock band Thirty Seconds to Mars
- Ted Nugent – rock musician
- Jem Targal – bass guitarist and singer for the rock group Third Power

== See also ==
- WORB - Defunct Radio Station
