= Lester Lake (Waterford Township, Michigan) =

Lake in the state of Michigan, United States

- Location within Michigan
- Location: Oakland County, Michigan
- Coordinates: 42.703269°N 83.423354°W
- Max. depth: 25 ft (7.6 m)
- Surface elevation: 965 feet (294 m)
- Settlements: Waterford Township and Independence Township

Lester Lake is a lake in Oakland County, Michigan lake along the main branch of the Clinton River.

Most of the lake lies within Waterford Township, however the northern portion of the lake is in Independence Township.

Lester Lake connects upstream to the 117-acre Greens Lake. It also connects to 179-acre Lotus Lake and 234-acre Maceday Lake.

Boaters can get from Lester Lake to Lotus Lake only by way of a narrow culvert under the railroad tracks. Downstream, Lester Lake connects to the 66-acre, 90-feet deep Van Norman Lake.

== Namesake ==
Lester Lake was named for William Lester, an early Oakland County settler.

In 1818, William Lester, Colonel Stephen Mack (1766–1826), Major Joseph Todd (1765–1848) and Orisen Allen were the first to settle what would become the city of Pontiac, Michigan.

William Lester located on section 29 in Pontiac.

== Camp ==
Camp Brady was a Boy Scout camp operated by the Detroit Area Council. It was located on the eastern shore of Lester Lake. The camp also extended across the street (Andersonville Road) to Greens Lake. The camp was in existence from 1921 through 1946.

In 1946, the camp was sold to the United Way and was used as a camp for mothers and daughters through 1972. It was also used by the Detroit Public Schools for underprivileged children. The portion of Camp Brady on Lester Lake was sold off as residential property in 1946.

== Depot ==
In 1851, the Detroit and Milwaukee Railway came through Waterford Township and in so doing made the lakes of the area, including Lester Lake, easily accessible to summer vacationers from the big cities.

The Windiate depot, along with the Waterford depot, the Drayton Plains depot and the Clarkston depot served to make Waterford Township and Independence Township a resort area.

== Resort ==
The Windiate Park Hotel was a summer resort for vacationers from Detroit and Lansing. The resort was easily accessed by four trains a day during the summer months from the 1890s to the 1940s and was located across the railroad tracks from Lester Lake on Lotus Lake, near the Windiate depot. The resort featured boating, fishing, sailing, sunbathing, tennis and a dance hall. The resort was owned by J.D. and M.L. Rice.

== Fish ==
Fish in Lester Lake include pumpkinseed sunfish, largemouth bass, walleye, northern pike and crappie.
