= Jay'viar Suggs =

American football player (born 2001)

No. 62 – New Orleans Saints
- Position: Defensive tackle
- Roster status: Practice squad

Personal information
- Born: February 24, 2001 (age 25); Flint, Michigan, U.S.
- Listed height: 6 ft 3 in (1.91 m)
- Listed weight: 305 lb (138 kg)

Career information
- High school: Clarkston (Clarkston, Michigan)
- College: Grand Valley State (2019–2023); LSU (2024); Wisconsin (2025)
- NFL draft: 2026: undrafted

Career history
- New Orleans Saints (2026–present)*
- * Offseason or practice squad member only
- Stats at Pro Football Reference

Jay'viar Suggs (born February 24, 2001) is an American professional football defensive tackle for the New Orleans Saints of the National Football League (NFL). He played college football for the Grand Valley State Lakers, LSU Tigers, and Wisconsin Badgers.

== Early life ==
Suggs attended Clarkston High School in Clarkston, Michigan, and committed to play college football for the Division II Grand Valley State Lakers.

== College career ==
=== Grand Valley State ===
Suggs took a redshirt in 2019 before the 2020 season was cancelled due to the COVID-19 pandemic, and did not record any stats in 2021. In 2022, he tallied 21 tackles with seven being for a loss, three sacks, five pass deflections, and a forced fumble. In 2023, Suggs notched 23 tackles with seven and half going for a loss, and five sacks, earning second team all-conference honors. After the season, Suggs entered his name into the NCAA transfer portal.

Suggs finished his career at Grand Valley State with 42 tackles with being for a loss 14.5 tackles, eight sacks, two forced fumbles and nine passes defended.

=== LSU ===
Suggs transferred to play for the LSU Tigers. On December 11, 2024, he announced that he would enter the transfer portal.

=== Wisconsin ===
On January 3, 2025, Suggs announced that he would transfer to Wisconsin.

== Professional career ==
Pre-draft measurables
| Height | Weight | Arm length | Hand span | Wingspan | 40-yard dash | 10-yard split | 20-yard split | 20-yard shuttle | Three-cone drill | Vertical jump | Broad jump | Bench press |
|---|---|---|---|---|---|---|---|---|---|---|---|---|
| 6 ft 2 3/4 in (1.90 m) | 305 lb (138 kg) | 32 1/4 in (0.82 m) | 9 1/4 in (0.23 m) | 6 ft 5 in (1.96 m) | 5.05 s | 1.70 s | 2.90 s | 4.50 s | 7.72 s | 34.0 in (0.86 m) | 9 ft 0 in (2.74 m) | 24 reps |
All values from Pro Day

After going undrafted in the 2026 NFL draft, Suggs signed with the New Orleans Saints. On August 30, 2026, Suggs was waived by the Saints as a part of final roster cuts; he was re–signed to the team's practice squad the following day.
