= Independence Township, Michigan =

- Charter township
- Charter Township of Independence
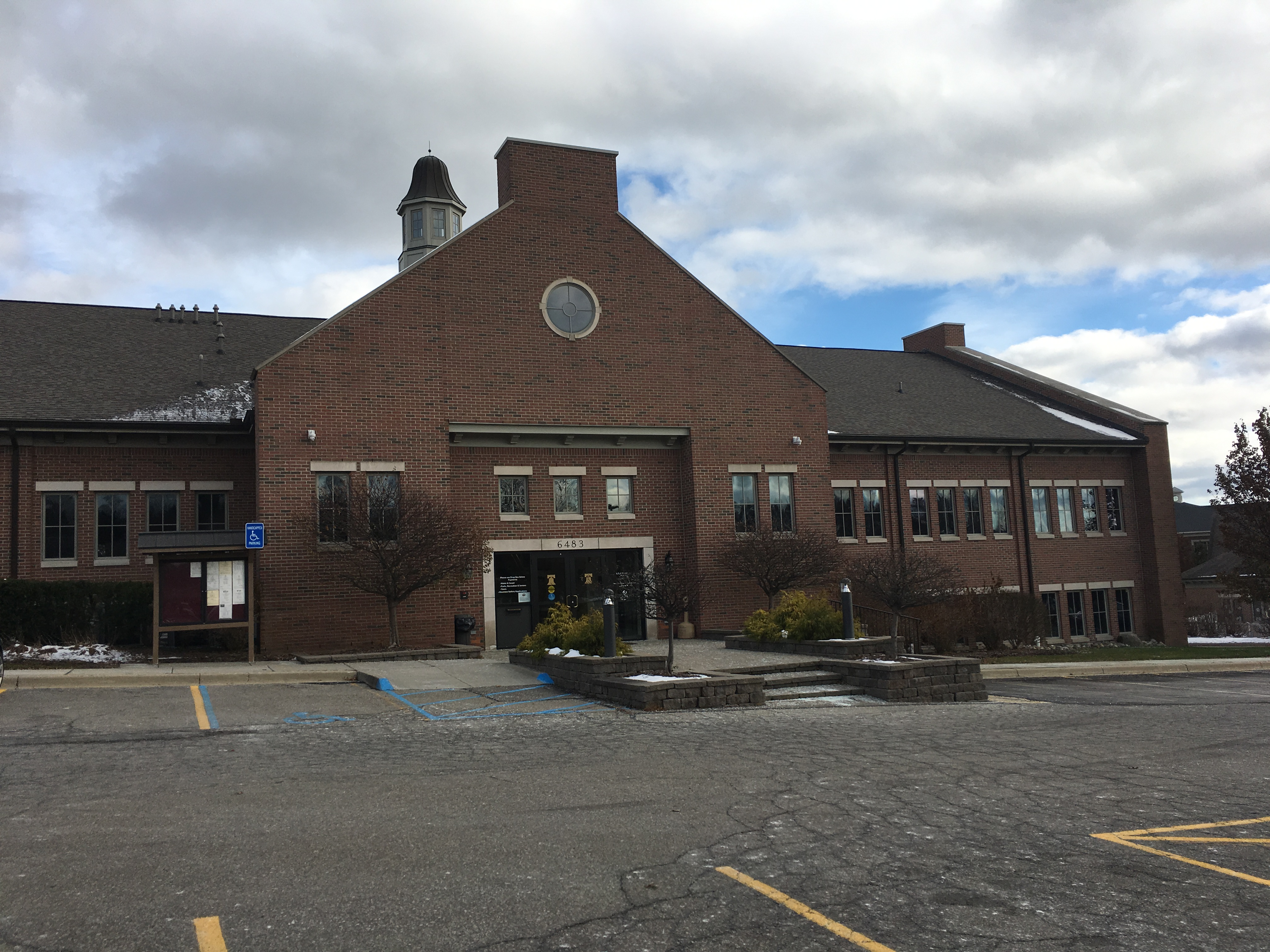
- Town hall

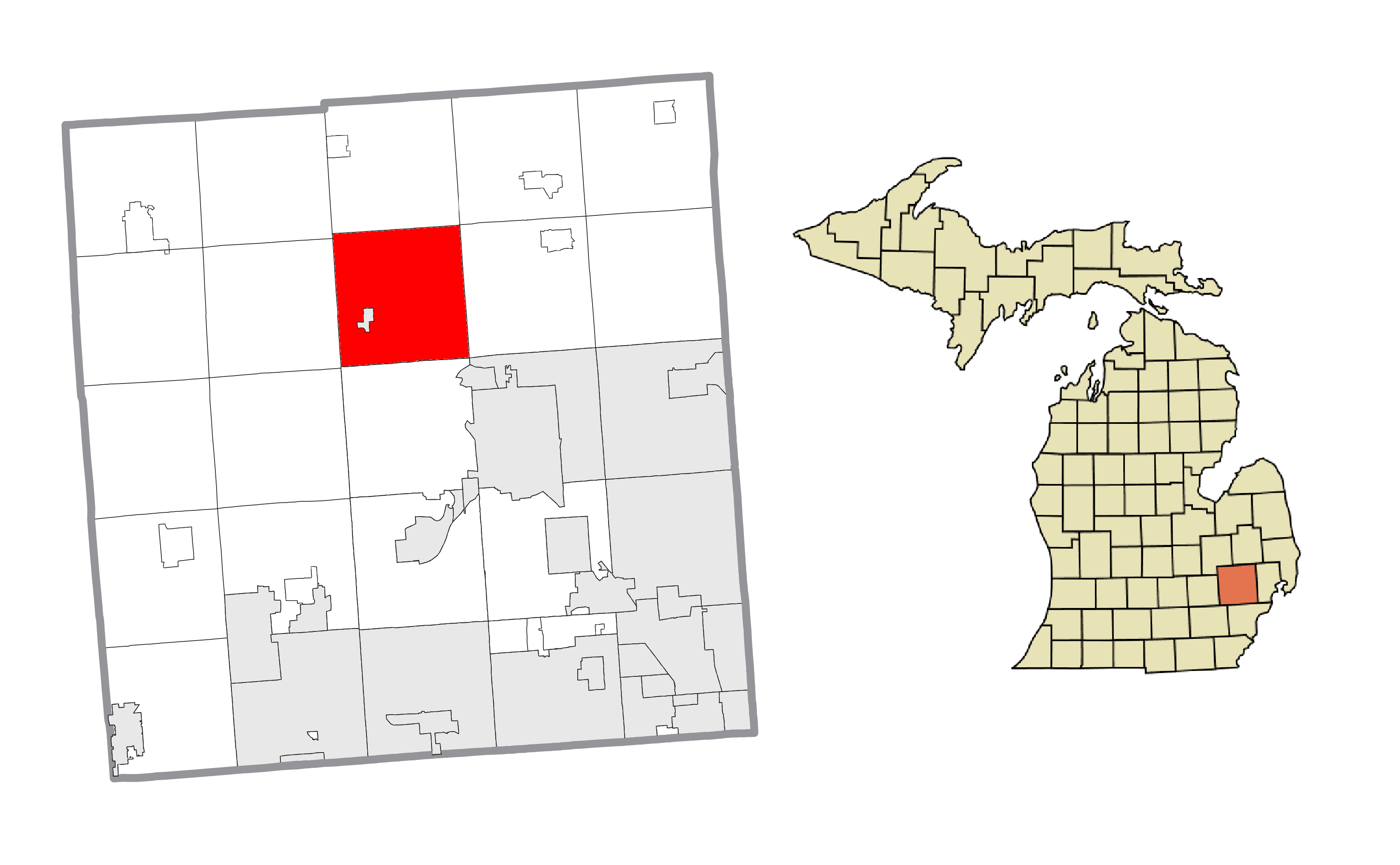
- Location within Oakland County

- Location within the state of Michigan Location within the United States
- Coordinates: 42°44′24″N 83°22′59″W
- Country: United States
- State: Michigan
- County: Oakland
- Established: 1834

Government
  - Supervisor: Chuck Phyle, II
  - Clerk: Cari Neubeck
  - Treasurer: Paul A Brown, CPA

Area
  - Charter township: 36.32 sq mi (94.08 km^{2})
  - Land: 35.04 sq mi (90.75 km^{2})
  - Water: 1.29 sq mi (3.33 km^{2})
- Elevation: 1,112 ft (339 m)

Population (2020)
  - Charter township: 36,686
  - Density: 1,047.1/sq mi (404.3/km^{2})
  - Metro: 4,296,250 (Metro Detroit)
- Time zone: UTC-5 (Eastern (EST))
  - Summer (DST): UTC-4 (EDT)
- ZIP code(s): 48346, 48348 (Clarkston)
- Area codes: 248 and 947
- FIPS code: 26-40400
- GNIS feature ID: 1626511
- Website: Official website

Independence Township is a charter township of Oakland County in the U.S. state of Michigan. The population was 36,686 at the 2020 census.

Independence Township was first organized in 1834. The township surrounds the city of Clarkston, but the two are administered autonomously after Clarkston incorporated as a city in 1992. The township is home to the Pine Knob Music Theatre and the Pine Knob Ski Resort.

== History ==
The first settlers arrived in Independence Township in the mid-1820s and early 1830s, primarily from New Jersey and New York. The first settler to purchase and settle land in the township was John W. Beardslee (b. 1799, d. 1883), from Sussex County, New Jersey.

Independence Township was named by one of its earliest settlers, Joseph Van Sycle, who came to the area in 1834 from Independence Township, New Jersey.

While initially the township was primarily agricultural, the many lakes in the area were beginning to draw vacationers out of Detroit and other cities. In 1851, the railroad came through Clarkston, which prompted hotels to be built in the township to accommodate the resort vacationers coming to the area.

The invention of the automobile had a tremendous effect on Independence Township. Roads that were once Native American trails were paved and widened for this new mode of transportation. The old Saginaw Trail, now known as Dixie Highway, was paved as early as 1920, and Main Street (M-15) in Clarkston was paved around 1922.

The expanding national highway system brought I-75 through Independence Township in 1962, spurring both business and residential development. Many farms gave way to subdivisions and strip malls as Independence Township continued evolving into part of Metropolitan Detroit.

== Geography ==
According to the U.S. Census Bureau, the township has a total area of 36.30 square miles (94.02 km^{2}), of which 34.99 square miles (90.62 km^{2}) is land and 1.31 square miles (3.39 km^{2}) (3.61%) is water.

The township is part of the Metro Detroit area and is 40 miles (64 km) northwest of Detroit.

=== Major highways ===
- I-75 runs diagonally east–west through the southern portion of the township and has two access points at exit 89 (Sashabaw Road) and exit 91 (M-15).
- US 24 (Dixie Highway) runs briefly south–north through the southwest corner of the township and has its eastern terminus just to the west in Springfield Township.
- M-15 runs north beginning at Dixie Highway and passes through the city of Clarkston. It is known as Main Street near Clarkston and Ortonville Road north of Clarkston.

== Education ==
Independence Township is primarily serviced by the Clarkston Community Schools.

In 2016, Clarkston High School had an enrollment of 1,930 students in grades ten through twelve. The school is located at 6093 Flemings Lake Road in Independence Township.

Clarkston High School offers twenty-six varsity sports, and competes in the Oakland Activities Association. It is a member of the Michigan High School Athletic Association.

Renaissance High School is located at 6558 Waldon Road in Independence Township. Renaissance High School is for students in grades 9 to 12 who need an alternative to the traditional high school setting in order to be successful. Renaissance students must meet Clarkston High School graduation requirements and receive a Clarkston High School diploma. Renaissance students are encouraged to participate in athletics, clubs and extracurricular activities offered at Clarkston High School. Renaissance students can also take courses at the Oakland Schools Campus, whose Northwest campus is also located in the township at 8211 Big Lake Road.

Clarkston Junior High School is located at 6595 Waldon Road in Clarkston. The school teaches eight and ninth grades.

Sashabaw Middle School is located at 5565 Pine Knob Lane in Independence Township. The school teaches sixth and seventh grades.

There are seven public elementary schools in Independence Township:

- Bailey Lake Elementary School
- Clarkston Elementary School
- Independence Elementary School
- North Sashabaw Elementary School
- Pine Knob Elementary School
- Anderson Elementary School
- Springfield Plains Elementary School

Everest Academy and High School is a private Roman Catholic high school also located in the township at 5935 Clarkston Road in Independence Township. The school competes athletically in the Catholic High School League and is a member of the Michigan High School Athletic Association.

== Golf ==
Independence Township is home to three public golf courses; Fountains Golf Club, an 18-hole course located at 6060 Maybee Road in Independence Township, Pine Knob Golf Club, a 27-hole course, located at 5580 Waldon Road in Independence Township, and Shepherd's Hollow Golf Club, a 27- hole championship course rated 42nd best golf course in the United States by Golf Magazine. It is located at 9085 Big Lake Road in Independence Township.

Oakhurst Golf and Country Club is a private club, located at 7000 Oakhurst Lane in Independence Township. Oakhurst was the home of the 99th Michigan Amateur

== Skiing and music ==
Pine Knob is a ski resort located in Independence Township. It features 17 trails and 12 lifts. It is known for its slope called "The Wall".

Pine Knob is also home to the Pine Knob Music Theatre, an outdoor amphitheater concert venue that has featured hundreds of celebrities and is always one of the highest grossing outdoor amphitheaters in the United States. It is located in Independence Township minutes away from downtown Clarkston.

== Hills and lakes ==
Independence Township is located along the Hillsdale-Lapeer Moraine Range. The highest hill along that range in Independence Township is Pine Knob, at 1,221 feet. It is also the highest point in Southeastern Michigan. Only three miles away is Waterford Hill, the second highest hill in Independence Township with an elevation of 1,150 feet. Atop Waterford Hill is Olympus Circle, the highest elevation of any residential street in Independence Township.

The Clinton River winds its way through Independence Township creating more than thirty named lakes of all sizes along the way.

Lakes in Independence Township
Lake	Size in acres	Depth in feet
Cranberry Lake	35	
Crooked Lake (previously Lower Bushman Lake)	68	65
Dark Lake (adjacent to Deer Lake)	5	10
Dark Lake (adjacent to Whipple Lake)	7	12
Deer Lake	137	63
Dollar Lake	3	15
Flemings Lake	27	
Greens Lake	117	55
Gulick Lake	16	
Heather Lake (part)	64	
Knox Lake	2	
Lake Oakland (part)	255	64
Lester Lake (part)	12	25
Little Walters Lake	17	
Lotus Lake (part)	179	65
Mead Lake	11	
Middle Lake	23	35
Morgan Lake	50	
Parke Lake	23	50
Round Lake	37	
Sans Souci Lake (part)	7	
Spring Lake	12	15
Townsend Lake	26	55
Upper Bushman Lake	30	32
Van Norman Lake (most)	66	90
Walters Lake	77	76
Whipple Lake	75	50
Woodhull Lake (part)	135	56

== Demographics ==
The population of Independence Township was 34,681 at the 2010 census.

In Independence Township in 2010, there were:

- 11,765 households
- 9,094 families
- 12,375 housing units
- 95.84% White
- 1.22% Asian
- 0.84% African American
- 0.24% Native American
- 2.75 was the average household size
- 3.14 was the average family size
- 27.7% under the age of 18
- 6.9% from 18 to 24
- 31.7% from 25 to 44
- 25.7% from 45 to 64
- 8.1% who were 65 years of age or older
- $74,992 was the median income

== Notable people ==
This list includes people from the area (Clarkston and Independence Township).

- Valerie Bertinelli, actress
- Tim Birtsas, former MLB player
- Dan Dickerson, radio play-by-play broadcaster for the Detroit Tigers
- Dane Fife, former Indiana University basketball player and current assistant coach at Michigan State University
- Henry Ford, industrialist and founder of the Ford Motor Company. Maintained a summer home and weekend cottage on Main Street. Ford also owned a mill which operated on the water from what is now called "Mill Pond" in Clarkston. This building still exists in part but has been modernized into a small mall which includes art galleries and office space. He also purchased the old school building on N. Main St. to serve as an apprentice school.
- John Hardon, Jesuit priest, theologian
- Steve Howe, former MLB pitcher, 1980 NL Rookie of the Year (LA Dodgers)
- Geoff Johns, comic book writer
- Scott Kamieniecki, former MLB player
- Tim McCormick, former NBA player and current sports broadcaster
- Bob Miller, former NFL player
- Marisha Pessl, author
- Ryan Riess, professional poker player, 2013 World Series of Poker champion
- Tim Robinson, comedian, former cast member and writer on Saturday Night Live
- Ron Serafini, former NHL player
- David Simko, former NASCAR Cup Series driver
- Samuel William Smith, former member of the United States House of Representatives
