= Pine Knob =

Landform in Oakland County, Michigan

- Location within Michigan

Highest point
- Elevation: 1,201 ft (366 m)
- Coordinates: 42°44′32″N 83°22′02″W

Geography
- Topo map(s): USGS 7.5' topographic map Pine Knob, Independence Township, Michigan

Geology
- Mountain type: Summit

Pine Knob is a hill located in Independence Township in Oakland County, near Clarkston, Michigan. The hill is classified as a summit. It extends from Waldon Road to the south to Clarkston Road to the north, and from Sashabaw Road to the west to Pine Knob Road to the east. With an elevation of 1,201 feet, Pine Knob is the second-highest ski resort in Southeast Michigan, behind only Alpine Valley Ski Area in White Lake. It is home to Pine Knob Ski Resort, Pine Knob Music Theater, Pine Knob Mansion, Pine Knob Golf Club, as well as residential homes.

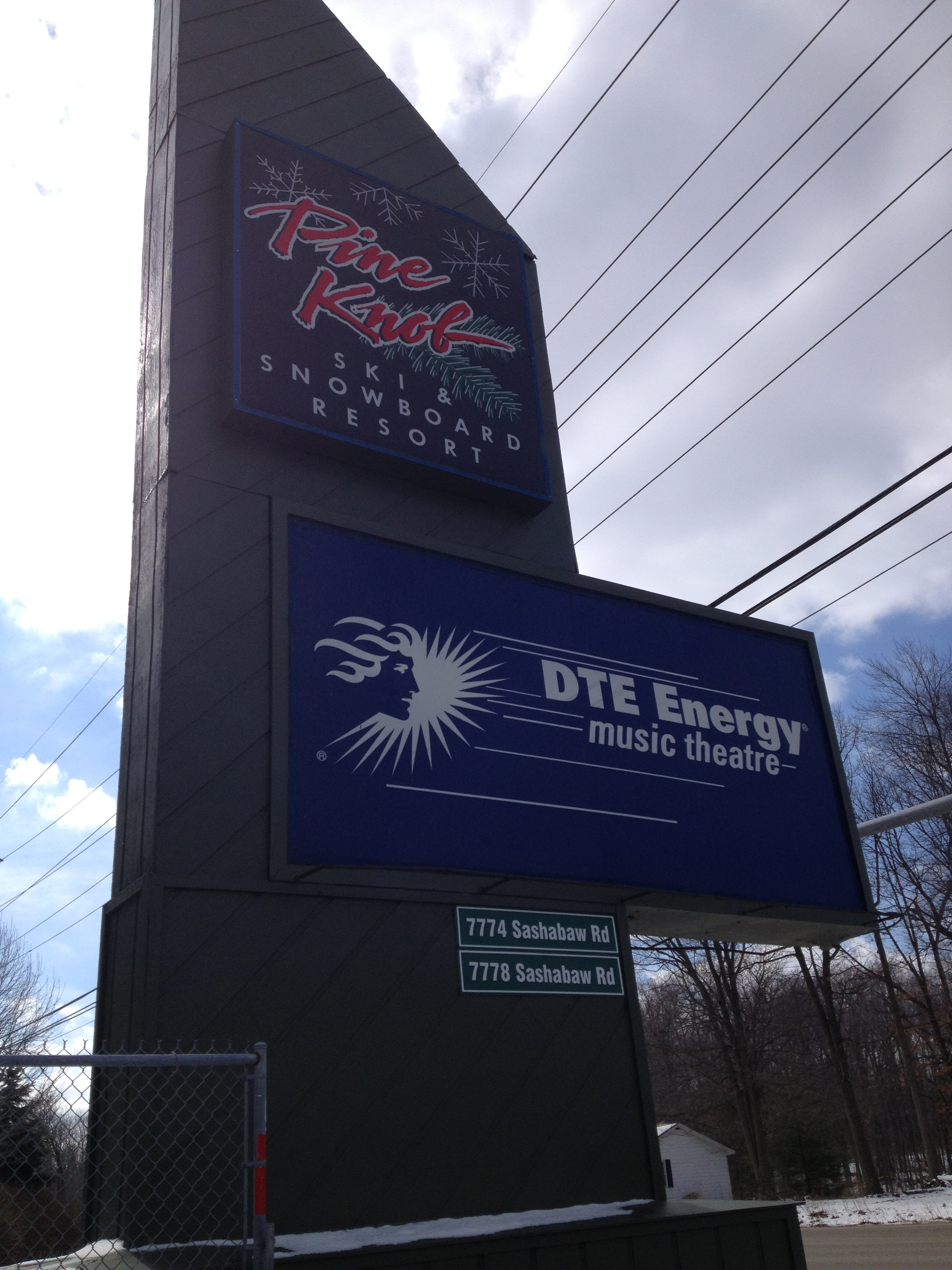
Pine Knob Ski Resort and Music Theatre, Sashabaw Road entrance.

== Ski resort ==
Pine Knob is a ski and snowboard resort located off of Sashabaw Road and Pine Knob Road. It features seventeen trails, twelve lifts and three terrain parks. Its signature trail is "The Wall" which is a steep mogul run.

== Music theater ==
Pine Knob Music Theatre is a 15,274-seat (7,202 seats in the pavilion; 8,072 on the lawn) outdoor amphitheater concert venue that has featured hundreds of celebrities and is one of the highest grossing outdoor amphitheaters in the United States. The concert venue, which opened in 1972, was originally called Pine Knob Music Theater until DTE Energy purchased its naming rights in 2001. On 14 January 2022, the theatre was restored to its original name.

== Mansion ==
Colonel Sidney D. Waldon (1873-1945), an executive at Packard Motor Company, purchased 840 acres of land at Pine Knob in 1927. There he built a 19-room English manor residence. A carriage house was constructed several hundred feet away from the mansion for the caretaker and his family. Behind this home were barns that housed his thoroughbreds and carriages. Today, the mansion and carriage house serve as a banquet facility for weddings and other events. It is located off of Waldon Road.

== Golf club ==
Pine Knob Golf Club is a 27-hole championship golf course, designed by Leo Bishop and Dan Pohl. The three courses are the Eagle, Falcon and Hawk. The first tee-box on the Eagle course is the highest elevation in Oakland County. It is located off of Waldon Road.

== Residential homes ==
Fairways at Pine Knob, Pine Knob Enclaves and Pine Knob Manor are residential developments located on Pine Knob and include luxury homes and luxury condominiums. They are located off of Waldon Road.
