= Dane Fife =

American basketball player and coach (born 1979)

Biographical details
- Born: July 26, 1979 (age 47); Clarkston, Michigan, U.S.

Playing career
- 1998–2002: Indiana
- 2002: Gary Steelheads

Coaching career (HC unless noted)
- 2003–2005: Indiana (grad assistant)
- 2005–2011: IPFW
- 2011–2021: Michigan State (assistant)
- 2021–2022: Indiana (assistant)

Head coaching record
- Overall: 82–97 (.458)

Accomplishments and honors

Awards
- As player: Big Ten Defensive Player of the Year (2002); McDonald's All-American Game (1998); Third-team Parade All-American (1998); Mr. Basketball of Michigan (1998)

Dane Fife (born July 26, 1979) is an American former college basketball player and assistant coach. Fife is the former head coach of the Indiana University–Purdue University Fort Wayne (IPFW) Mastodons men's basketball team and a former college assistant coach at Michigan State University under Tom Izzo for ten years before leaving to become an assistant coach at his alma mater, Indiana University. He was let go by Indiana after one season.

== Playing career ==
Fife played basketball and football for Clarkston High School in Clarkston, Michigan. In basketball, he was coached by his father, Dan Fife. After his senior season in 1998, he was named Mr. Basketball of Michigan over runner-up Antonio Gates, and was also named a McDonald's All-American and Parade All-American. A blue-chip recruit in basketball and also a star quarterback, Fife was recruited to play both sports in college. He ultimately committed to play basketball for Indiana under head coach Bob Knight. He chose Indiana over Duke, Michigan State, and Michigan, where his father had played baseball and his older brother Dugan had played basketball. Fife became a vocal supporter of Knight, and nearly transferred from the team to Michigan State following the coach's firing in 2000.

Fife was a starter for Indiana during their 2002 NCAA runner-up campaign. He finished his career with the Hoosiers having scored 736 total points. Fife also owns Indiana's all-time steals record (180) and earned the Big Ten Defensive Player of the Year award his senior season.

One of the more well-known plays of his college career came on a controversial call during the final seconds of a 2002 Sweet Sixteen game against Duke. The Blue Devils were down by four points with enough time remaining for one play when Fife was called for fouling Jason Williams on a three-point shot. Williams' shot was good, and he was given the opportunity to tie the game with a free throw. Fortunately for Fife, Williams failed to make the free throw, and the Hoosiers advanced to the Elite Eight by holding on for a 74–73 win. Fife is often asked about the play and denies committing the foul to this day. The Hoosiers continued their NCAA Tournament run, defeating Kent State and Oklahoma before falling to Maryland in the national championship game, 64–52.

Fife played one season of professional basketball, in 2002 with the Gary Steelheads of the Continental Basketball Association.

== Career statistics ==
Legend
GP	Games played	GS	Games started	MPG	Minutes per game
FG%	Field goal percentage	3P%	3-point field goal percentage	FT%	Free throw percentage
RPG	Rebounds per game	APG	Assists per game	SPG	Steals per game
BPG	Blocks per game	PPG	Points per game	**Bold**	Career high

=== College ===
Year	Team	GP	GS	MPG	FG%	3P%	FT%	RPG	APG	SPG	BPG	PPG
1998–99	Indiana	33	11	17.1	.450	.243	.683	2.1	1.5	1.0	.1	3.3
1999–2000	Indiana	27	22	23.5	.455	.227	.800	3.0	2.0	1.8	.2	4.9
2000–01	Indiana	34	34	32.9	.374	.306	.629	2.8	3.2	1.4	.2	5.1
2001–02	Indiana	37	37	32.7	.461	.478	.702	2.6	2.5	1.4	.2	8.7

== Coaching career ==
=== Assistant at Indiana ===
Fife spent two seasons as an administrative assistant on the staff of Mike Davis at Indiana. During his time as an assistant, he concurrently earned a master's degree in athletic administration.

=== Head coach of IPFW ===
Fife was named head coach of the IPFW Mastodons basketball team in 2005 at the age of 25, becoming the youngest head coach in NCAA basketball history at the time. In his first season, he led the Mastodons to 10 wins, the most the team had earned in a season since jumping to Division I in 2001. In his fifth season as coach, the 2009–10 Mastodons squad posted their first-ever winning record as a Division I basketball team. Upon joining the Summit League in the 2007–08 season, the Mastodons finished no worse than fifth place in conference play under Fife.

Before the 2010–11 season, Fife had considered assistant coaching jobs at Indiana under Tom Crean and Michigan under John Beilein. He ultimately remained at IPFW, where he coached the team to a program-best 18–12 record.

Fife's teams at IPFW improved their winning percentage from the previous season in each year that Fife coached.

=== Assistant at Michigan State ===
Following the 2010–11 season Fife was contacted by Purdue basketball head coach Matt Painter to fill the associate head coach position. On April 15, 2011, Fife withdrew his name from consideration for the Purdue job. Fife was named assistant coach at Michigan State by Tom Izzo on April 20, 2011. He replaced Mark Montgomery, who was named head coach at Northern Illinois in March 2011.

Fife brought the defensive intensity he possessed as a player to his role as a coach, as the Spartans held opponents below a .400 field-goal percentage from 2011 to 2015, including ranking second nationally in both 2015–16 (.382) and in 2011–12 (.379), marking the best effort by MSU since 1959. He is also instrumental in MSU's scouting and recruiting efforts. Jeff Goodman and Jay Bilas of ESPN.com named Fife one of the best head coaching candidates in the nation.

On March 23, 2017, it was rumored that Fife was close to accepting the head coaching position at Duquesne, but shortly thereafter it was reported that he had declined the position. His name was also mentioned as a possibility for the vacant head coaching position at his alma mater, Indiana, in both 2017 and 2021.

=== Assistant at Indiana ===
On April 5, 2021, it was announced that Fife would be leaving Michigan State to join Mike Woodson's staff at Indiana. On March 23, 2022, Woodson announced that he had decided not to retain Fife and he would not be returning to the coaching staff.

== Personal life ==
Fife is the son of Clarkston High School head coach and former Minnesota Twins pitcher Danny Fife. He is the younger brother of former Michigan basketball captain Dugan Fife.

== Head coaching record ==
Record table
Season	Team	Overall	Conference	Standing	Postseason
**IPFW Mastodons** (Independent) (2005–2006)
2005–06	IPFW	10–18			
**IPFW Mastodons** (United Basketball Conference) (2006–2007)
2006–07	IPFW	12–17	6–4	3rd	
**IPFW Mastodons** (The Summit League) (2007–2011)
2007–08	IPFW	13–18	9–9	5th	
2008–09	IPFW	13–17	8–10	5th	
2009–10	IPFW	16–15	9–9	5th	
2010–11	IPFW	18–12	11–7	4th	
IPFW:		82–97 (.458)	43–39 (.524)		
Total:		82–97 (.458)			
National champion Postseason invitational champion Conference regular season champion Conference regular season and conference tournament champion Division regular season champion Division regular season and conference tournament champion Conference tournament champion
