= Clarkston Community Schools =

School district in Michigan, United States

Address
- 6389 Clarkston Rd. Clarkston, Oakland, Michigan, 48346; United States

District information
- Type: Public
- Grades: Pre-kindergarten through 12
- Superintendent: Shawn Ryan
- Schools: 13
- Budget: $124,045,000 (2022-2023 expeditures)
- NCES District ID: 2609900

Students and staff
- Students: 6,728 (2024-2025)
- Teachers: 444.52 FTE (2024-2025)
- Staff: 998.98 FTE (2024-2025)
- Student–teacher ratio: 15.14 (2024-2025)

Other information
- Website: www.clarkston.k12.mi.us

Clarkston Community Schools is a public school district in Metro Detroit in the U.S. state of Michigan, serving Clarkston, most of Independence Township and Springfield Township, and small portions of Waterford and White Lake Township.

== History ==
Clarkston High School opened in fall 1998, with a construction cost of $58 million ($112 million in 2025 dollars). The architect was URS Greiner. The former Clarkston High School, opened in fall 1960, became Clarkston Middle School (which became Clarkston Junior High) and the former Clarkston Middle School became Renaissance High School.

Enrollment in the district peaked during the 2009–2010 school year at 8,295 students. Enrollment in the district has declined to 6,757 in the 2023–2024 school year, reflecting a trend in the state overall.

At the junior high school, a new auditorium was built in 2004. As part of the bond issue passed in 2022, the junior high school will be rebuilt, with the auditorium remaining. The new school will open in phases beginning in fall 2025.

== Schools ==
Clarkston Community Schools
| Schools | Address | Notes |
High schools
| Clarkston High School | 6093 Flemings Lake Road, Clarkston | Grades 10-12. Built in 1998. |
| Renaissance High School | 6558 Waldon Road, Clarkston | Alternative high school, grades 9-12. Built in 1930. |
Middle schools
| Sashabaw Middle School | 5565 Pine Knob Lane, Clarkston | Grades 6-7 Built in 1969. |
| Clarkston Junior High School | 6595 Waldon Road, Clarkston | Grades 8-9 Built in 1960; rebuilt in 2025. |
Elementary schools
| Andersonville Elementary School | 10350 Andersonville Road, Davisburg | Grades K-5 Built in 1952. |
| Bailey Lake Elementary School | 8051 Pine Knob Road, Clarkston | Grades K-5 Built in 1954. |
| Clarkston Elementary School | 6589 Waldon Road, Clarkston | Grades K-5 Built in 1952. |
| Early Childhood Center | 6397 Clarkston Road, Clarkston | Preschool |
| Independence Elementary School | 6850 Hubbard Road, Clarkston | Grades K-5 Built in 2001. |
| North Sashabaw Elementary School | 5290 Maybee Road, Clarkston | Grades K-5 Built in 1967. |
| Pine Knob Elementary School | 6020 Sashabaw Road, Clarkston | Grades K-5 Built in 1956. |
| Springfield Plains Elementary School | 8650 Holcomb, Clarkston | Grades K-5 Built in 1997. |
