= Clarkston Village Historic District =

Historic district in Michigan, United States

Village of Clarkston, Michigan
- City
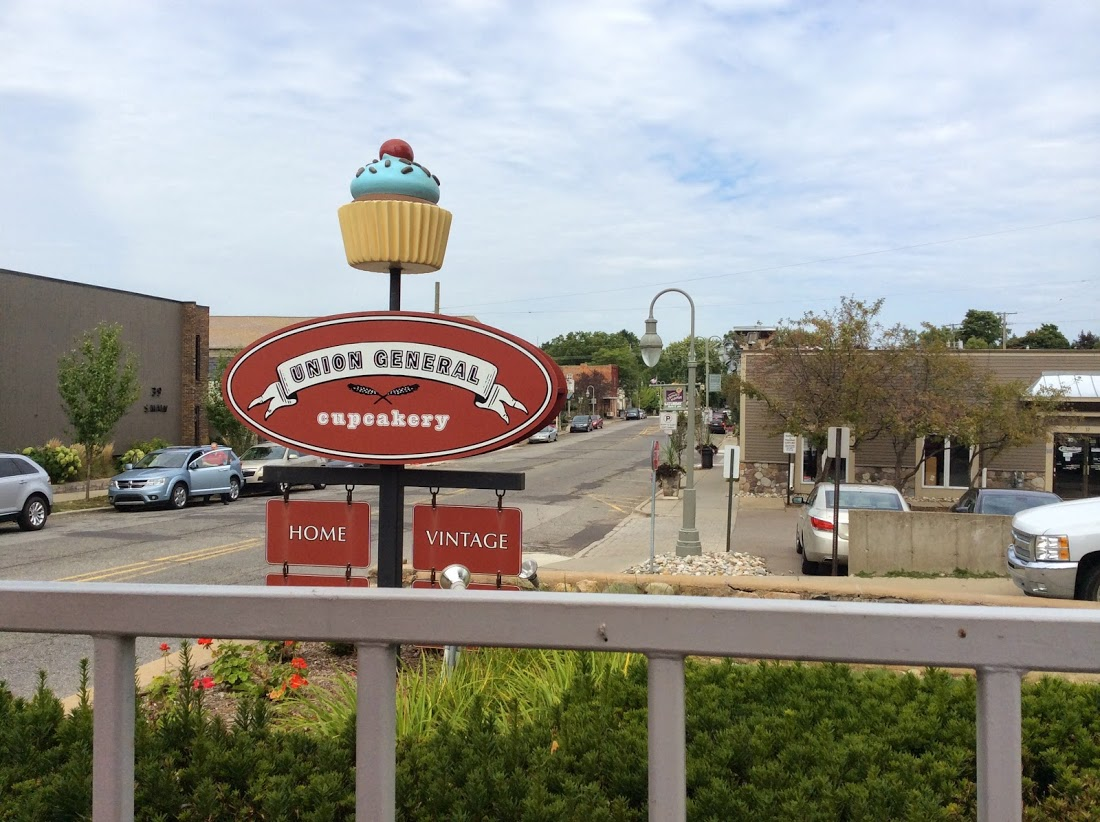

- Location within the state of Michigan
- Coordinates: 42°44′11.0″N 83°25′08.0″W
- Country: United States
- State: Michigan
- County: Oakland
- Township: Independence
- Clarkston Village Historic District
- U.S. National Register of Historic Places
- Michigan State Historic Site
- Interactive map
- NRHP reference No.: 80001884

Significant dates
- Added to NRHP: May 15, 1980
- Designated MSHS: January 16, 1976

The Village of Clarkston is located in the southern part of Independence Township, Michigan along M-15.

The Village of Clarkston was designated a Michigan State Historic Site on January 16, 1976 and was listed on the National Register of Historic Places on May 15, 1979.

The Clarkston Village Historic District includes Buffalo Street, Church Street, Clarkston Road, Depot Road, Holcomb Street, Main Street (M-15), Miller Road, Waldon Road and Washington Street.

The Clarkston Village Historic District includes over 100 historic structures.

== Architecture ==
The Village of Clarkston was listed as an historic site because of its architecture and its historical significance. There are many preserved Queen Anne style architecture homes in the village. In addition, the house styles include Bungalow, Colonial Revival, Empire, Gothic Revival, Greek Revival, Mansard, Stick Style, Tudor Revival and Vernacular architecture.

== History ==
The first land purchases were made nearly a decade earlier, in 1823, by the Williams family of Waterford Township. By 1831, early inhabitants like Linus Jacox, Butler Holcomb, John and Thomas Beardslee and Melvin Door established homesteads, and it was not long before more settlers from New York and New Jersey arrived.

They included Jeremiah Clark in 1832, followed by his brother, Nelson, who built his home in 1839 in what would become the Village of Clarkston. It still stands at 71 N. Main Street. The Clarks built a sawmill and gristmill, started a fish hatchery, and opened a general store. In 1840 they platted the village and two years later, in 1842, grateful settlers voted to name the village Clarkston.

== Growth ==
By 1877, the Clarkston area grew to include nearly 1,400 residents as well as thriving farms and businesses. The village was home to several stores, including furniture, clothing and jewelry shops, as well as hotels, wagon makers, harness makers, liveries and three physicians.

The first school, Sashabaw School, was built in 1834 at the corner of Maybee Road and Pine Knob Road. The Union School was built in 1840 in the center of the village.

The Methodist Episcopal Church [b. 1873] on Buffalo Street and The First Baptist Church [b. 1847] on Main Street were both established in the mid 1800s.

== Transformation ==
Once the railroad was established in 1851, tourists from Detroit and Pontiac discovered Clarkston's lakes, farms and woodlands. It wasn’t long before hotels like the Demarest House, Vliets-On-The-Hill and Deer Lake Inn were built to accommodate the influx of summer visitors, and a new opera house on the top floor of the downtown Maccabees Building kept them entertained.

The transformation of Clarkston was complete with the invention of the automobile. Roads that were once Native American trails were paved and widened for this new mode of transportation. The Saginaw Trail, now known as Dixie Highway, was paved as early as 1920, and Main Street (M-15) was paved around 1922.

The expanding national highway system brought I-75 through the Clarkston area in 1962, spurring both business and residential development. Many farms gave way to subdivisions and strip malls as the Clarkston area continued evolving into a northern Detroit suburb.

== See also ==
- National Register of Historic Places listings in Oakland County, Michigan
