= Dark Lake (Independence Township, Michigan) =

Lake in the state of Michigan, United States

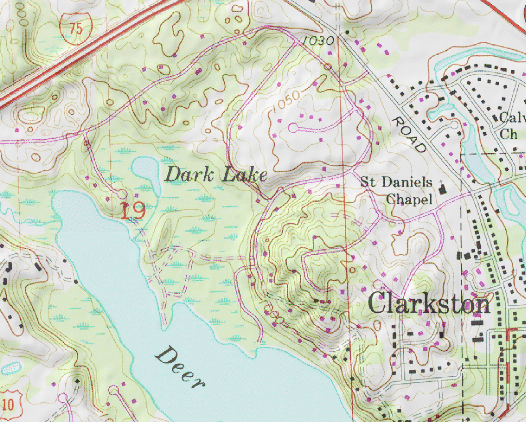

- Location within Michigan Location within the United States
- Location: Oakland County, Michigan
- Coordinates: 42.7408627°N 83.4371642°W
- Basin countries: United States
- Surface area: 5 acres (2.0 ha)
- Max. depth: 10 ft (3.0 m)
- Surface elevation: 968 ft (295 m)
- Settlements: Independence Township

Dark Lake
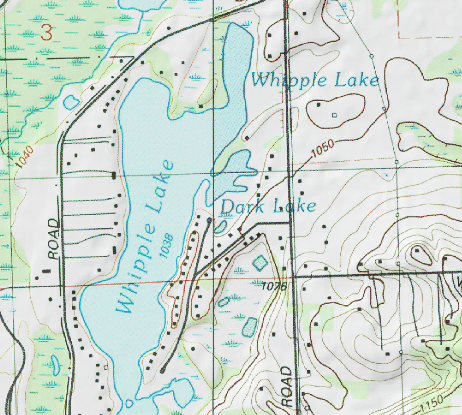

- Location within Michigan Location within the United States
- Location: Oakland County, Michigan
- Coordinates: 42.7805852°N 83.3741084°W
- Basin countries: United States
- Surface area: 7 acres (2.8 ha)
- Max. depth: 12 ft (3.7 m)
- Surface elevation: 1,030 ft (310 m)
- Settlements: Independence Township

Dark Lake is the name given to two separate lakes within Independence Township in Oakland County, Michigan. The lakes lie approximately 4.5 miles (7.2 km) apart.

One lake covers 5 acres (2.0 ha), with a depth of 10 feet (3.0 m). It connects to Deer Lake on its north side.

The other lake covers 7 acres (2.8 ha), with a depth of 12 feet (3.7 m). It connects to Whipple Lake on its east side.

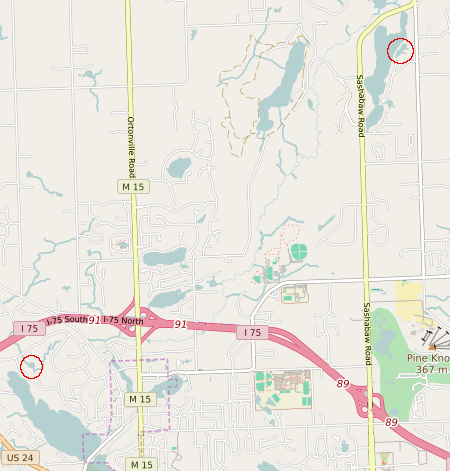
Partial map of Independence Township, with each Dark Lake circled
