= Upper Bushman Lake (Independence Township, Michigan) =

Lake in the state of Michigan, United States

- Location within Michigan Location within the United States
- Location: Oakland County, Michigan
- Coordinates: 42°47′20″N 83°22′41″W
- Type: Lake
- Basin countries: United States
- Surface area: 30 acres (12 ha)
- Max. depth: 32 ft (9.8 m)
- Surface elevation: 1,030 ft (314 m)
- Settlements: Independence Township

Upper Bushman Lake is a 30-acre (12 ha) lake along the Clinton River. The lake, with a maximum depth of 32 feet (9.8 m), lies within Independence Township in Oakland County, Michigan.

The lake is located east of Sashabaw Road, south of Oak Hill Road, within the Independence Oaks County Park.

Upper Bushman Lake connects downstream to Crooked Lake
