= Woodhull Lake =

Lake in the state of Michigan, United States

- Location within Michigan Location within the United States
- Location: Oakland County, Michigan
- Coordinates: 42°42′07″N 83°22′42″W
- Type: Reservoir Level controlled Natural Lake
- Basin countries: United States
- Surface area: 135 acres (55 ha)
- Max. depth: 56 ft (17 m)
- Surface elevation: 955 ft (291 m)
- Settlements: Waterford Township and Independence Township

Woodhull Lake is a 135-acre (55 ha) all-sports lake located in central Oakland County, Michigan. The lake has a maximum depth of 56 feet (17 m). It is located in both Waterford Township and Independence Township.

Woodhull Lake is located on the upper reaches of the Clinton River watershed. The Clinton River enters Woodhull Lake on the west end and exits on the north end. Approximately three-quarters of a mile upstream is the dam for Van Norman Lake, the next lake upstream. The Clinton River between these two lakes is wide with slow flow. Also upstream is the 26-acre Townsend Lake.

Downstream from Woodhull Lake, it is connected to Lake Oakland. There is a dam on Lake Oakland and both Lake Oakland and Woodhull Lake have a legal established lake level elevation of 957.43 feet (291.82 m).

On the southeast side of Woodhull Lake, there is a connection to Eagle Lake, a small, 19-acre (7.7 ha), 20-foot (6.1 m) deep lake which flows into Woodhull Lake.

== Namesake ==
Woodhull Lake was named for John Chatfield Hedges Woodhull (1804-1877) who, along with his wife Rachel Woodhull (1808-1872), owned much of the northern property in section 35 of Independence Township on the lake that would bear their family name.

== Fish ==
Woodhull Lake fish included bluegill, pumpkinseed, northern pike, rock bass, black crappie, largemouth bass, brown bullhead, bowfin and carp.
