= Spring Lake (Independence Township, Michigan) =

Lake in Oakland County, Michigan, United States

- Location within Michigan
- Location: Oakland County, Michigan
- Coordinates: 42.7196054°N 83.3927446°W
- Basin countries: United States
- Max. depth: 15 ft (4.6 m)
- Surface elevation: 863 feet (263 m)
- Settlements: Independence Township

Spring Lake is a lake located along Maybee Road at an elevation of 863 feet (263 m).

The lake, with a depth of 15 feet, lies within Independence Township in Oakland County, Michigan.

== Golf ==
Spring Lake is home to Fountains public golf course.
