= Jem Targal =

American bass guitarist (1947–2021)

- Born: February 28, 1947; Ann Arbor, Michigan, U.S.
- Died: October 8, 2021 (aged 74)
- Genres: Hard rock, psychedelic rock
- Occupations: Musician, songwriter, singer, guitarist, bassist
- Instruments: Bass guitar, vocals
- Formerly of: Third Power

Jem Targal (February 28, 1947 – October 8, 2021) was an American bass guitarist and singer, known best as a member and co-founder of the rock group Third Power.

== Third Power ==
Third Power was an American psychedelic hard rock band formed in 1969 in Detroit, Michigan. The band featured Drew Abbott on vocals and guitar, Jim Craig on drums, and Targal on vocals and bass guitar. Targal also served as the group's main songwriter.

The group became a prominent local club band before signing to Vanguard Records. Guitarist Drew Abbott and bassist Jem Targal shared singing duties.

They released an album, Believe, on the label in 1970. The album made modest sales but the group disbanded in 1971.

== Early years ==
Jem Targal was born in 1947 in Ann Arbor, Michigan at the University of Michigan Hospital.

His family lived in Whitmore Lake, Michigan until Targal was two years old while his father attended and taught at the University of Michigan. In 1949, his family moved to Teke near Istanbul, Turkey when his father began teaching at the American College in Istanbul. In 1951, Targal's family returned to Michigan where they lived on Marlboro Street in Detroit. It was in Detroit where Targal learned to play the violin and the guitar.

In 1965, Targal graduated from Cooley High School in Detroit. After high school, Targal attended Oakland Community College in Auburn Hills, Michigan, where he met his future Third Power band member, Drew Abbott.

== Later years ==
Bob Seger lived next door to Targal on Airport Road in Waterford Village, Michigan. It was there where Seger met his future bandmate, Drew Abbott. Abbott went on to work with Seger in 1973 with the Silver Bullet Band, and recorded the mega-hit albums "Live Bullet", "Night Moves" and "Against the Wind."

After Third Power disbanded, Targal led his own solo career. In 1978, Targal released his "Luckey Guy" album.

He lived near Mobile, Alabama with his wife, Patricia Ann (Steen) Targal.

== Discography ==
- Believe (Vanguard Records, 1970) U.S. #194 as The Third Power.
- Luckey Guy (Sheavy, 1978)
