= Walters Lake (Independence Township, Michigan) =

Lake in the state of Michigan, United States

Dollar Lake
- Location within Michigan
- Location: Oakland County, Michigan
- Coordinates: 42°45′50″N 83°20′50″W
- Type: Lake
- Basin countries: United States
- Surface area: 77 acres (31 ha)
- Max. depth: 21 ft (6.4 m)
- Surface elevation: 1,040 ft (317 m)
- Settlements: Independence Township

Walters Lake is a 77-acre (31 ha), 21-foot (6.4 m) deep lake.

The lake lies within Independence Township in Oakland County, Michigan.

Walters Lake is north and east of Clarkston Road, and north of Clintonville Road.

Walters Lake connects upstream with Heather Lake.

== Fish ==
Walters Lake fish include Largemouth Bass, Bluegill and Perch.
