= Van Norman Lake (Michigan) =

Lake in the state of Michigan, United States

- Location within Michigan Location within the United States
- Location: Oakland County, Michigan, U.S.
- Coordinates: 42°42′15″N 83°24′48″W
- Type: Reservoir
- Basin countries: United States
- Surface area: 66 acres (27 ha)
- Max. depth: 90 ft (27 m)
- Surface elevation: 968 ft (295 m)
- Islands: one
- Settlements: Independence Township, Waterford Township

Van Norman Lake is a private, all-sports, 66-acre (27 ha) lake along the main branch of the Clinton River, in Oakland County, in the U.S. state of Michigan. Most of the lake lies within Independence Township; however, the southern portion of the lake is in Waterford Township.

The lake was formed when a dam was built in the late 19th century on the Clinton River near Dixie Highway and Andersonville Road. Prior to then, a small pond existed in Waterford Village on the southeastern shore.

The 90-foot-deep (27 m) lake currently has one island. There were three islands as late as the 1980s; however, two have since disappeared due to erosion.

Van Norman Lake connects upstream to Lester Lake (12 acres (4.9 ha)) and Greens Lake 117 acres (47 ha)) to the east and downstream to Townsend Lake (26 acres (11 ha)) and Woodhull Lake (135 acres (55 ha)) to the west.

Van Norman Lake is the deepest lake in Independence Township and the sixth-deepest of the 387 lakes in Oakland County.

== Namesake ==
Van Norman Lake was named for Zenas Harvey Van Norman, who owned the property along the entire northern shore of the lake from 1886 to 1916. That property was section 32 in Independence Township, Michigan, also known as Waterford Hill. With an elevation of 1,150 feet (350 m), his property was the second highest point in Independence Township.

Prior to being named Van Norman Lake, the lake was called Mill Pond.

== Fish ==
Fish in Van Norman Lake include pumpkinseed sunfish, largemouth bass, walleye, northern pike and crappie.
