= WORB =

- Farmington Hills, Michigan; United States
- Broadcast area: 2 mile radius of Oakland Community College
- Frequency: 90.3 (MHz)
- Branding: WBWC 90.3 FM The Orb

Programming
- Format: Defunct (was Alternative)

Ownership
- Owner: Oakland Community College

History
- First air date: 1976
- Last air date: September 22, 1999
- Call sign meaning: Orchard Ridge Broadcasting

Technical information
- Class: D
- Power: 12 watts

WORB (90.3 FM) was a non-commercial, college radio station located on the campus of Oakland Community College in Farmington Hills, Michigan United States. WORB was a student-run radio station that featured alternative rock music as well as specialty shows. Staff, volunteers, and DJs for the station were made up of Oakland Community College students, and faculty. Cult shock rocker GG Allin was even interviewed on one show, which led to an investigation by the college and the FCC. The station ceased broadcasting on September 22, 1999.
