= Eagle Lake (Waterford Township, Michigan) =

Lake in the state of Michigan, United States

- Location within Michigan
- Location: Oakland County, Michigan
- Coordinates: 42°41′50″N 83°22′52″W
- Type: Lake
- Basin countries: United States
- Surface area: 19 acres (7.7 ha)
- Max. depth: 20 ft (6.1 m)
- Surface elevation: 958 ft (292 m)
- Settlements: Waterford Township

Eagle Lake is a 56-acre (23 ha) lake in central Oakland County, Michigan. The lake has a maximum depth of 20 feet (6.1 m). It is located in Waterford Township.

The lake is west of Dixie Highway, north of Walton Boulevard, and east of Sashabaw Road.

Eagle Lake connects with Woodhull Lake to the east.

== Namesake ==
Eagle Lake was named for Solomon G. Eagle (1817-1890), who, along with his wife Ellen Eagle (1815-1877) and their five children, owned a 249-acre farm in sections 3 and 4 in Waterford Township on the northern shore of the lake that would bear their family name. Solomon was born in Ireland.

== Fish ==
Eagle Lake fish included bluegill, pumpkinseed sunfish, northern pike, rock bass, black crappie, largemouth bass, yellow perch, brown bullhead, yellow bullhead, bowfin and carp.
