= Third Power (band) =

American psychedelic hard rock band

- Origin: Detroit, Michigan, U.S.A.
- Genres: Hard rock, psychedelic rock, acid rock
- Years active: 1969–1971
- Labels: Vanguard Records
- Past members: Jem Targal Drew Abbott Jim Craig

Third Power was an American psychedelic hard rock band from Detroit, Michigan, who released one album in 1970.

The group was formed in 1969, and became a prominent local club band before signing to Vanguard Records. Guitarist Drew Abbott and bassist Jem Targal shared singing duties. They released an album, Believe, on the label in 1970. The album made modest sales but the group disbanded in 1971. Abbott later went on to work with Bob Seger, and Targal briefly led his own solo career. Seger lived next door to Targal in Waterford Village, Michigan and met Abbott there.

== Discography ==
- Believe (Vanguard Records, 1970) U.S. #194

== Members ==
- Drew Abbott - guitars, backing and lead vocals
- Jem Targal - bass, lead vocals
- Jim Craig - drums
