= United Basketball Conference =

College basketball scheduling alliance

The United Basketball Conference (UBC) was a scheduling alliance of NCAA Division I basketball independents which began play in January 2007. Its members were:

- Indiana University – Purdue University Fort Wayne (IPFW)
- New Jersey Institute of Technology (NJIT)
- North Dakota State University (NDSU)
- South Dakota State University (SDSU)
- University of Texas–Pan American (UTPA)
- Utah Valley University

It was first announced in January 2006. Utah Valley was the men's "champion" for the 2006–07 season, with a 9–1 conference record and a 22–7 record overall.

NDSU, SDSU and IPFW joined The Summit League on 1 July 2007. NJIT, UTPA and Utah Valley joined the Great West Conference on 10 July 2008.
