= Dollar Lake (Independence Township, Michigan) =

Lake in the state of Michigan, United States

- Location within Michigan
- Location: Oakland County, Michigan
- Coordinates: 42°43′28″N 83°25′24″W
- Type: Lake
- Basin countries: United States
- Max. depth: 15 ft (4.6 m)
- Surface elevation: 971 ft (296 m)
- Settlements: Independence Township

Dollar Lake is a lake along the main branch of the Clinton River. The lake lies within Independence Township in Oakland County, Michigan.

Dollar Lake connects upstream with Middle Lake to the north and downstream (under a bridge over Dixie Highway) with Greens Lake to the west.

== Name ==
Dollar Lake was named so because it was shaped round like a silver dollar.

== Fish ==
Dollar Lake fish include Largemouth Bass, Bluegill and Perch.
