= Townsend Lake (Independence Township, Michigan) =

Lake in the state of Michigan, United States

- Location within Michigan Location within the United States
- Location: Oakland County, Michigan
- Coordinates: 42°42′24″N 83°24′05″W
- Type: Lake
- Basin countries: United States
- Surface area: 26 acres (11 ha)
- Max. depth: 55 ft (17 m)
- Surface elevation: 951 ft (290 m)
- Settlements: Independence Township

Townsend Lake is a 26-acre (11 ha) lake in Independence Township in Oakland County, Michigan, United States, along the main branch of the Clinton River.

Townsend Lake connects upstream to 66-acre (27 ha) Van Norman Lake and downstream to 135-acre (55 ha) Woodhull Lake.

== Namesake ==
Townsend Lake was named for Townsend Carpenter Beardslee. The son of John W. Beardslee (the first settler in Independence Township), Townsend was the first white child born in the township.

== Fish ==
Fish in Townsend Lake include pumpkinseed sunfish, largemouth bass, walleye, northern pike and crappie.
