= Crooked Lake (Independence Township, Michigan) =

Lake in the state of Michigan, United States

- Location within Michigan
- Location: Oakland County, Michigan
- Coordinates: 42°46′38″N 83°23′37″W
- Type: Lake
- Basin countries: United States
- Surface area: 68 acres (28 ha)
- Max. depth: 65 ft (20 m)
- Surface elevation: 961 ft (293 m)
- Settlements: Independence Township

Crooked Lake is a 68-acre lake along the Clinton River. The lake, with a maximum depth of 65 feet, lies within Independence Township in Oakland County, Michigan.

The lake is located west of Sashabaw Road and south of Shappie Road.

Crooked Lake connects upstream to Upper Bushman Lake

Crooked Lake was formerly named Lower Bushman Lake.

== Fish ==
Crooked Lake does not have a catch-and-release policy like nearby Upper Bushman Lake. Fish in Crooked Lake include pickerel, yellow perch, largemouth bass, pumpkinseed sunfish, northern pike and crappie.
