= Middle Lake (Independence Township, Michigan) =

Lake in the state of Michigan, United States

- Location within Michigan Location within the United States
- Location: Oakland County, Michigan
- Coordinates: 42°43′35″N 83°25′27″W
- Type: Lake
- Basin countries: United States
- Max. depth: 35 ft (11 m)
- Surface elevation: 968 ft (295 m)
- Settlements: Independence Township

Middle Lake is a lake at an elevation of 968 feet (295 m). It is along the main branch of the Clinton River. The 35 feet (11 m) deep lake lies within Independence Township in Oakland County, Michigan.

Middle Lake connects downstream to Dollar Lake to the south and upstream to Deer Lake to the north.

== Cemetery ==
Lakeview Cemetery sits on the western shore of Middle Lake. The cemetery is one of the oldest cemeteries in northern Oakland County and many of the original settlers and developers of Independence Township are buried there.

Middle Lake was formerly named Cemetery Lake until the 1960s.

== Fish ==
Middle Lake fish include Largemouth Bass, Bluegill and Perch.
