= Waterford Village, Michigan =

- Waterford Village
- U.S. National Register of Historic Places
- Michigan State Historic Site
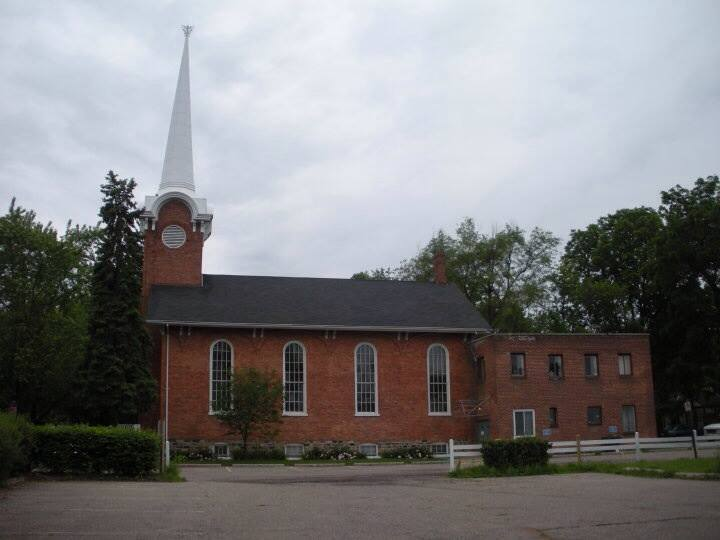
- Village of Waterford's first church, built in 1869

- Location within Michigan Location within the United States
- Location: Oakland County, Oakland County, Michigan; United States
- Coordinates: 42°42′00″N 83°24′20″W
- Built: 1818
- NRHP reference No.: 79001167

Significant dates
- Added to NRHP: August 10, 1979
- Designated MSHS: June 18, 1976

Waterford Village is an historic community in Waterford Township, Michigan. First settled in 1819, the village is located in the northernmost part of the township along Dixie Highway, on the southeast shore of Van Norman Lake.

== History ==
In 1818, Alpheus Williams and his brother-in-law, Captain Archibald Phillips, entered the first land purchase for $2.00 an acre. Archibald Phillips and Alpheus Williams purchased 161.4 acres in what would become Waterford Village, Michigan.

In 1818, Mr. and Mrs. Alpheus Williams, their four daughters and two sons, along with Captain Archibald Phillips and Major and Mrs. Oliver Williams, with their eight children, set out to settle Oakland County.

In 1818, the Oliver Williams family established the first farm settlement in the county on the banks of Silver Lake.

Archibald Phillips and Alpheus Williams continued on northward about nine miles to where the Clinton River crossed the old Saginaw Trail. This area would become Waterford Village. Here the first house of the village was built by Alpheus Williams on the north bank of the river across from the south corner where Grand River Street met the Saginaw Trail. Williams and Phillips also built the first dam where the Clinton River crossed over the Saginaw Trail and erected the first saw mill there.

In 1844, Dr. George W. Williams (b.1793-d.1845) built the first gristmill in Waterford on what later became Mill Street. George was no relation to Alpheus or Oliver.

Early pioneers owning land tracts in the village in 1872 include:

- Franklin Bradley (b.1845-d.1916)
- Frederick Bradley (b.1808-d.1873)
- Richard Brownson (b.1804-d.1891)
- Orson E. Clark (d.1891)
- Frank W. Fifield (b.1821-d.1893)
- James M. Ganong (b.1828-d.1906)
- Nelson R. Ganong (b.1833-d.1892)
- Waterman P. Grow (b. 1824-d.1897)
- Elias K. Gustin (b.1844-d.1920)
- Leonard Hopkins (b.1799-d.1885)
- Lewis J. Keeler (d.1882)
- William Ladson (b.1843-d.1912)
- Daniel R. Lord (b.1814-d.1883)
- John G. Owen (b.1824-d.1901)
- Manuel R. Phillips (b.1833-d.1912)
- Phebe Stevens (d.1872)
- Lorenzo Streeter (b.1838-d.1921)
- Alfred W. Windiate (b.1845-d.1875)
- John Windiate (b.1808-d.1880)
- James Young (b.1809-d.1892)

Business owners in the village in 1872 include:

- William Bradt (b.1827-d.1888), proprietor of Waterford Exchange Hotel
- Richard Brownson, merchant, post master, dealer in drugs, patent medicines and groceries
- N.E. Clark, merchant, produce dealer
- R.H. Cooper, miller
- Frank W. Fifield & Son, merchant and dealer in general merchandise
- Graham Brothers, merchants and dealers in drugs, medicines, paints, oils, groceries
- W.H. Graham, physician and surgeon
- Gustin & Johns, Elias K. Gustin (b.1844-d.1920) and John C. Johns (b.1849-d.1906), proprietors, manufacturers of carriages and lumber wagons, sleighs, carriage and wagon ironing and horse shoeing
- Hixson, Lord & Co, Marshall Hixson (b.1842-d.1915) and Daniel R. Lord, proprietors, manufacturers of doors, sashes and blinds
- R.L. King (d.1913), farmer and manufacturer
- Norman Lee (b.1830-d.1897), shoemaker
- Daniel R. Lord & Co., foundry, manufacturers of plows and cultivators.
- Manuel R. Phillips, builder
- Lorenzo Streeter, manufacturer carriages, wagons and sleighs, carriage repairing, painting and ornamental glass staining
- L.A. Trudell, blacksmith
- A.B. Watson, builder
- Albert Wiser (b.1852-d.1830), livery
- Osmund Wigg, merchant and dealer in dry goods, groceries, boots and shoes

== Historic district ==
Waterford Village was designated a Michigan State Historic Site on June 18, 1976, and was listed on the National Register of Historic Places on August 10, 1979.

Geographically, the historic district includes Dixie Highway, a block north and south of Andersonville Road, then Andersonville Road between Dixie Highway and Airport Road, then south on Airport Road to the railroad tracks.

Included in the historic district are also the original houses and buildings on Dubay Street, Pontiff Street (originally Pond Street), and Steffens Street.

== Main streets ==
"The Old Saginaw Trail" (highlighted in red)

- The Saginaw Trail ran north from Detroit, through Pontiac and Waterford, on up through Flint and to Saginaw. In 1829, construction began on a road north from Detroit along the Saginaw Trail. That road became Saginaw Street and later Dixie Highway.
- Grand River Street began at Saginaw Trail in Waterford Village and headed west for four miles to the town of Andersonville, Michigan. The street was initially called Grand River Street, but then was changed to Maple Street before becoming Andersonville Road.
- Depot Street ran from Grand River Street south to the Waterford train depot. The street was renamed Airport Road after the Pontiac Municipal Airport opened in 1928.

== Cemetery ==
In 1826, Waterford Village's first cemetery was deeded by Captain Archibald Phillips to Governor Lewis Cass for burial purposes.

The first burial there was Olivere Williams (son of Alpheus Williams) who died at the age of 17 on June 9, 1820.

Alpheus Williams died July 9, 1828, at age 62 and his wife, Abigail, died September 5, 1826, at age 58. Both Alpheus and Abigail are buried there.

The cemetery today is called the Waterford Village Cemetery. It is located at the end of Clippert Street off Dixie Highway.

There are fifty-two graves in the cemetery. Two graves are unknown and one gravestone is unreadable.

== General store ==
The first store in the village was the home of Alpheus Williams where he kept a few shelves of staples. After his death, the land exchanged hands many times. In 1837, Merrick and Bruce purchased it and built the first established store next to the original home of Alpheus Williams on the north bank of the Clinton River on Dixie Highway. The store remained in operation for many years.

Circa 1857, Horace Huntoon (b.1837-d.1897) and a young handyman named John A. Griffen (b.1841-d.1917) built a general store in Waterford Village on the southwest corner of Andersonville Road and Dixie Highway (now 5799 Dixie Highway).

The general store had nine different proprietors between 1857 and 1927:

- 1857 to 1860, proprietor Horace Huntoon (b.1831-d.1897)
- 1860 to 1863, proprietor Phineas Huntoon (b.1827-d.1903)
- 1863 to 1865, proprietor John G. Owen (b.1824-d.1901)
- 1865 to c.1870, proprietor unknown.
- c.1870 to 1882, proprietor Osmond Wigg (b.1840-d.1920)
- 1882 to 1888, proprietor James R. Jones (b.1858-d.1933)
- 1888 to 1917, proprietors unknown.
- 1917 to 1927, proprietor August V. Jacober (b.1882-d.1966), the last proprietor of the store.

The general store housed everything needed for the village and surrounding community. From dry goods and tools to certain foods, patent medicines, household utensils, fancy jewelry, material for clothing, shoes, hats, cracker barrels, and even hard candy and a small selection of toys.

James R. Jones had the first telephone in the village installed in his store.

The Waterford General Store also had attractions for the local residents and the summer vacationers as well. The second floor of the store had a roller skating rink for a time and also was used as a theater for a period. James R. Jones and his wife Isabelle actually lived above the store for a while.

The general store was the heart of the community. The store served as a meeting place for friends, who swapped stories and debated politics

The storekeeper knew the latest news and often served as the Justice of the peace, and the village Postmaster. In 1865, John G. Owen became the first postmaster in Waterford Village. When zip codes were introduced in 1963, Waterford's zip code became 48095.

The store was idle for a few years in the early 1900s, but the second floor was used as a justice court, and a dance hall.

In 1927, Henry Ford purchased the store from August V. Jacober for $700. The store was moved and currently stands in Greenfield Village in Dearborn, Michigan. August Jacober built another store in the same location in Waterford Village and ran it until 1957.

== Hotel ==
In 1841, Stephen Besley (d.1869) began construction on a hotel at 5805 Saginaw Trail (Dixie Highway). Besley sold the hotel to Daniel R. Lord (d.1883) who sold it to William Bradt (b.1827-d.1888) by 1872, who named the hotel Bradt's Exchange. The hotel was also named the Waterford Exchange, and the Waterford Hotel. It served as a stagecoach stop for over 60 years.

On December 31, 1890, the Waterford Exchange Hotel caught fire, causing the death of local resident Jeremiah G. Ganong (b.1802) on March 20, 1891, from smoke inhalation. The hotel was repaired and re-opened for business.

In 1970, the hotel was demolished after having been closed for several years.

== Railroad ==
In 1851, the railroad was completed through Waterford. The original Waterford train depot was opened shortly after the railroad was completed. Built by the Detroit, Grand Haven and Milwaukee Railway, a subsidiary of the Grand Trunk Railroad, the depot stood on the northwest corner of the tracks on Depot Street (later called Airport Road).

The Waterford depot was 33.29 miles from Detroit and 155.02 miles from Grand Haven, Michigan. Two miles to the south of the Waterford depot was the Drayton Plains depot. Two miles north of the Waterford depot was the Clarkston depot, and just one mile north of the Waterford depot was the Windiate Park depot.

Because of the railroad, the Waterford area, with its many lakes, quickly became a summer resort community and drew large numbers of vacationers from Detroit and other cities along the railway line.

The original Waterford depot was built in the late 1850s. It was replaced in the early 1900s with a second depot on the same location. That depot was abandoned in 1959 and burned down due to an electrical fire in November, 1979. It was never rebuilt.

== Church ==
In 1869, a Baptist church became the first church built in Waterford Village. It later became a Methodist church.

The church is still standing at 5860 Andersonville Road near Dixie Highway. It was renovated in 1976 after being purchased by Waterford Township.

== Baseball ==
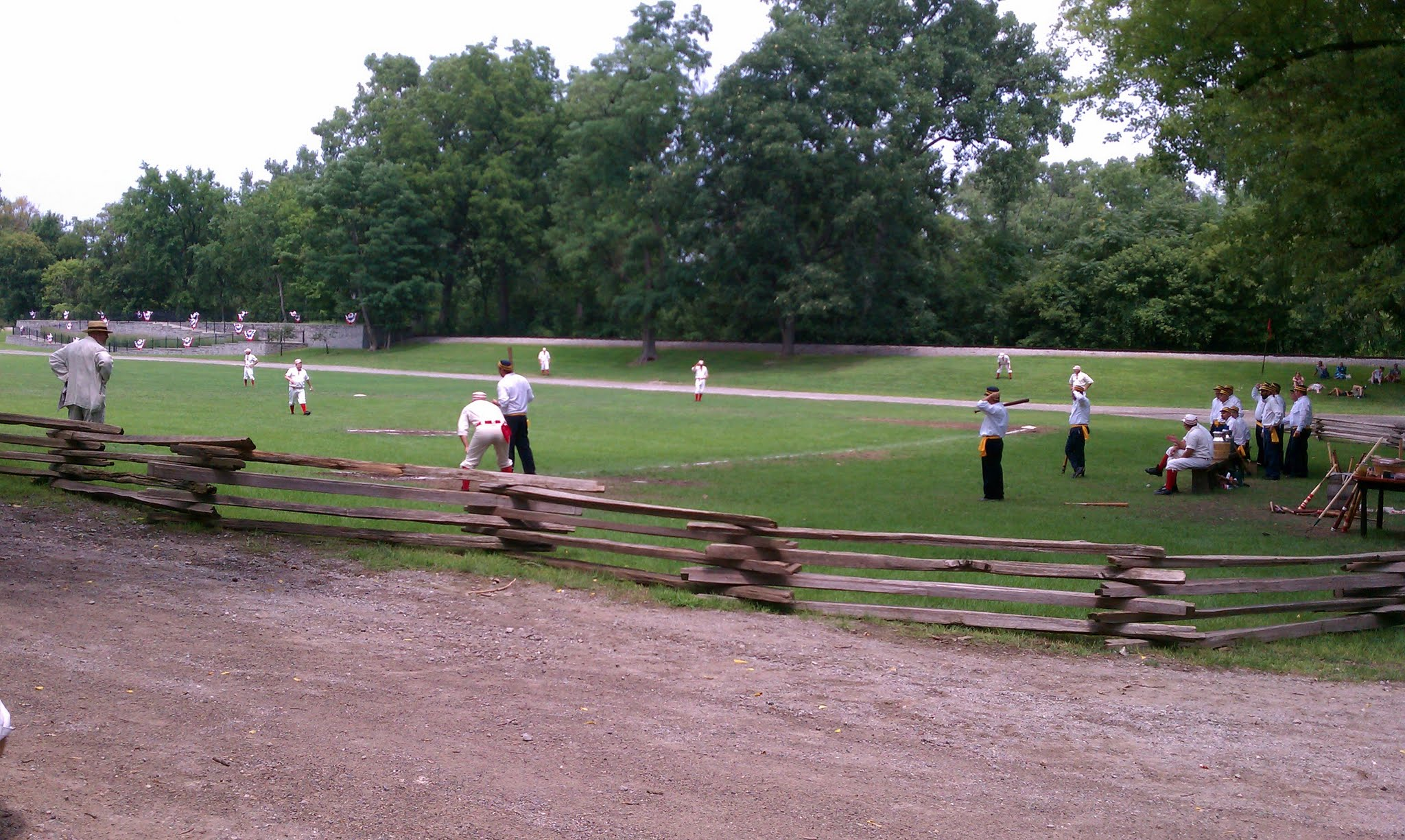
Today's Lah-De-Dahs baseball team

Michigan was one of the leading suppliers of men during the Civil War and many of those men went on to fight in battles in the East and South. While they were in service, they learned the east coast game of baseball (then spelled Base Ball) and brought it home with them.

Around 1887, Waterford Village started a baseball team. The team was named the Lah-De-Dahs. They played other teams from Detroit, Dearborn, Mount Clemens and beyond. They would travel by the train to play their away games.

The Lah-De-Dahs were reincarnated in the late 1900s as the Greenfield Village Lah-De-Dahs and play vintage base ball, wearing vintage uniforms, throughout the country today.

== School ==
In 1901, the first school was established in Waterford Village on Steffens Street and Andersonville Road. In 1910, the wooden school burned down but was rebuilt.

In 1927, a two-story brick building was built at 4241 Steffens Street. The elementary school was renamed Waterford Village School.

In 2014, Waterford Village School, the oldest in Waterford Township, was closed. The Waterford School District briefly turned the school into four preschool classrooms and a Michigan Works department, before demolishing it in December 2021.

== Tavern ==
In 1922, the Old Mill Tavern was built by Louis Dorman (b.1895-d.1976) in Waterford Village. It was located at 5828 Dixie Highway where the road crosses of the Clinton River. It was the most popular restaurant in Waterford Village for over a half century.

The tavern was destroyed by fire in 1982 and was never rebuilt.

== Newspapers ==
The first newspaper to serve Waterford was The Oakland Chronicle, which began publishing May 31, 1830, by Thomas Simpson. It was the fourth newspaper to be established in Michigan. It ceased on April 22, 1831. The equipment was sold to John R. Williams and his uncle, Joseph Campau, who moved it to Detroit to start the Democratic Free Press, which became the Detroit Free Press.

Since then, several local area newspapers have served Waterford residents.

- In 1834, The Oakland Patriot began publishing by Egbert J. Van Buren & Brother but ceased operations in 1836.
- In 1835, The Oakland Whig began publishing by Arthur G. Sparhawk. It became The Pontiac Courier the following year and was in operation until 1839 when it became The Jeffersonian.
- In 1838, The Jacksonian began publishing on July 10, 1838, by Eldrege & Denton. It was continued by The Pontiac Weekly Jacksonian and later The Pontiac Jacksonian.
- In 1839, The Jeffersonian, and Oakland, Lapeer, & Shiawassee Advertiser began publishing by J. Dowd Coleman. It ceased later that year and was continued by The Jefferson. It began publishing by William M. Thompson. In 1840, it changed its title to The Pontiac Jeffersonian. It ceased operations in 1841 and was continued by The Pontiac Courier.
- In 1841, the Pontiac Courier began publishing by William B. Sherwood. It ceased operations in 1842.
- In 1842, the Pontiac Jacksonian began publishing by Augustus W. Hovey & Co. and later by Cyrus Peabody, and then by W.B. Cole & T.S. Sheridan. It ceased operations in 1873.
- In 1844, the Oakland Gazette began publishing by J. Dowd Coleman. It ceased operations in 1851 and was continued by Pontiac Gazette. It began publishing 1851 by W.M. Thompson. It ceased operations in 1860 and was continued by Pontiac Weekly Gazette which published until 1866 before reverting to the earlier title published by W.I. Beardsley & C.B. Turner. In 1869, it added "Weekly" to the title once again and dropped it yet again in 1877
- In 1868, the Bill Poster and Monthly Visitor began publishing William Paul Nisbett. It was a monthly publication and later changed title to The Bill Poster and then to The Bill Poster and General Intelligencer. It changed title and publishers in 1869 to Pontiac Bill Poster. Its new publishers were William B. Nisbett and J.C. Viall. In 1871, its title changed to Pontiac Weekly Bill Poster and in 1882 back to Pontiac Bill Poster. It published a three-issue daily edition in 1877 during the Oakland County Fair. In 1890, it formed the Oakland County Post, which began publishing by Ferris S. Fitch. Its title was shortened to Post c. 1897. It ceased operations in 1907 when it was absorbed by the Pontiac Gazette.
- In 1876, the Clarkston Enterprise began publishing by Rev. J.R. Cordon. This semi-monthly was "Devoted to Religion, Morality, Prohibition, Literature, and Home News."
- In 1892, The Living Issues began publishing by Lulu V. Reynolds. It ceased in 1897.
- In 1893, the Pontiac Republican began publishing with Jay Clark as editor. It ceased operations in 1895 and was absorbed by the Pontiac Gazette.
- In 1900, The Evening Press began publishing by a company of the same name. It ceased the following year and was continued by Pontiac Daily Press. The Pontiac Daily Press became Daily Press in 1902, then the Pontiac Daily Press in 1903. In 1906, it merged with the Pontiac Gazette to form The Pontiac Daily Press, the Pontiac Gazette, and began publishing by Harry Coleman. Later that year the title was shortened to The Pontiac Press Gazette. In 1919, the title was lengthened again to The Pontiac Daily Press and Gazette and one month later it was changed to The Pontiac Daily Press. It was published by Howard H. Fitzgerald.
- In 1921, the Community Newsbegan publishing as a bi-weekly by Clarkston State Bank.
- In 1932, the Clarkston News began publishing by Eveleth Hancher and P.O. Pederson.
- In 1953, The Pontiac Daily Press changed its name to The Pontiac Press. It remained that until its name was changed to The Oakland Press in 1972. That same year, The Pontiac-Waterford Times began publishing by a company of the same name with C. Don Davidson as editor. Its title was later shortened to The Times.

== Notable people ==
- Bob Seger, singer, songwriter, musician and member of the Rock and Roll Hall of Fame, lived on Airport Road in the village.
- Jem Targal, member of the rock band Third Power, lived on Airport Road at Andersonville Road in the village.

== See also ==
- National Register of Historic Places listings in Oakland County, Michigan
