= Clarkston, Michigan =

- City
- City of the Village of Clarkston
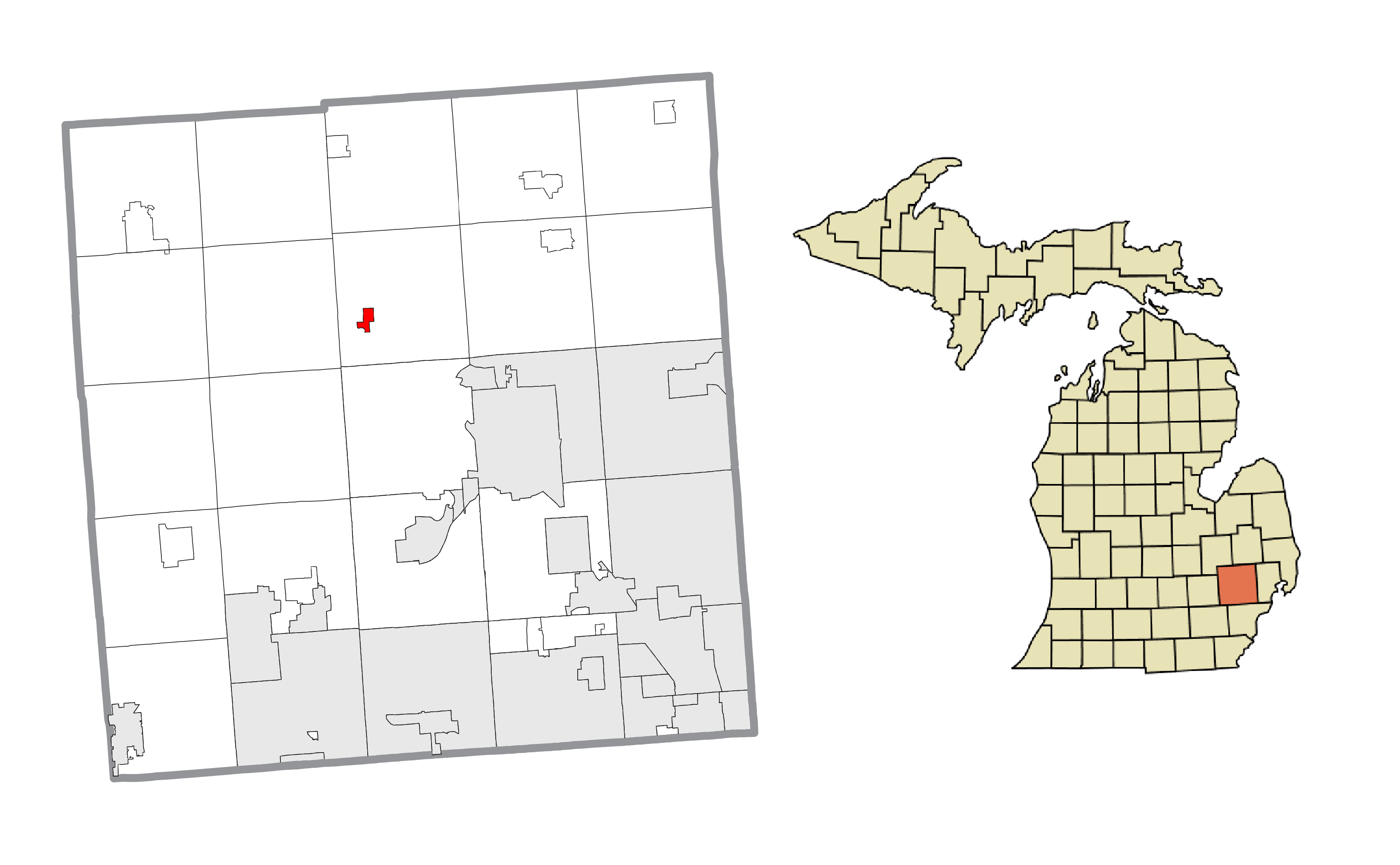
- Location within Oakland County

- Location within the state of Michigan
- Coordinates: 42°44′09″N 83°25′09″W
- Country: United States
- State: Michigan
- County: Oakland
- Settled: 1830
- Incorporated: 1884 (village); 1992 (city)

Government
  - Type: Mayor–council
  - Manager: Jonathan Smith

Area
  - Total: 0.52 sq mi (1.35 km^{2})
  - Land: 0.44 sq mi (1.15 km^{2})
  - Water: 0.077 sq mi (0.20 km^{2})

Population (2020)
  - Total: 928
  - Density: 2,096.3/sq mi (809.39/km^{2})
- Time zone: UTC-5 (EST)
  - Summer (DST): UTC-4 (EDT)
- ZIP code(s): 48346–48348
- Area codes: 248 and 947
- FIPS code: 26-82450
- GNIS feature ID: 623384
- Website: Official website

Clarkston (officially named the City of the Village of Clarkston) is a city in Oakland County, Michigan, United States. A northern suburb of Detroit, located about 34 mi (55 km) northwest of downtown Detroit, Clarkston is surrounded by Independence Township, but administered independently since its incorporation in 1992. At the 2020 census, the city had a population of 928. With a total land area of 0.44 square miles (1.14 km^{2}), Clarkston is the smallest city by land area in the state of Michigan.

== History ==
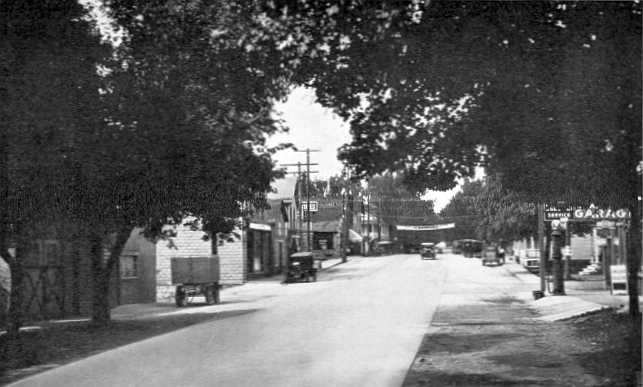
Clarkston, 1922

Squatter Linux Jacox from New York built the first house, a shanty, in Clarkston in 1830. In 1832, Butler Holcomb built the second house and a sawmill. On December 12, 1840, the Independence post office was transferred to the community and assumed its name. In 1842, the Clark brothers platted a tract of land for a village and gave it the name Clarkston. Clarkston was incorporated in 1884 as a village.

In 1992, the village of Clarkston was incorporated as a city.

=== Historic district ===
The Village of Clarkston was designated a Michigan State Historic Site on January 16, 1976 and was listed on the National Register of Historic Places on May 15, 1979.

The Clarkston Village Historic District includes Buffalo Street, Church Street, Clarkston Road, Depot Road, Holcomb Street, Main Street (M-15), Miller Road, Waldon Road and Washington Street.

== Geography ==
According to the United States Census Bureau, the city has a total area of 0.51 square miles (1.32 km^{2}), of which 0.44 square miles (1.14 km^{2}) is land and 0.07 square miles (0.18 km^{2}) (13.73%) is water.

Clarkston is the smallest city by land area in the state of Michigan. However, the city of Petersburg has a larger land area at 0.48 square miles (1.24 km^{2}) but a smaller total area (when water area is included). Clarkston has a total area of 0.51 square miles (1.32 km^{2}), while Petersburg contains no water and a total area of 0.48 square miles (1.24 km^{2}).

== Demographics ==
Historical population
Census	Pop.	Note	%±
1860	376		—
1870	471		25.3%
1880	368		−21.9%
1890	387		5.2%
1900	360		−7.0%
1910	345		−4.2%
1920	419		21.4%
1930	639		52.5%
1940	653		2.2%
1950	722		10.6%
1960	769		6.5%
1970	1,034		34.5%
1980	968		−6.4%
1990	1,005		3.8%
2000	962		−4.3%
2010	882		−8.3%
2020	928		5.2%
U.S. Decennial Census

=== 2010 census ===
As of the census of 2010, there were 882 people, 402 households, and 248 families residing in the city. The population density was 2,004.5 inhabitants per square mile (773.9/km^{2}). There were 440 housing units at an average density of 1,000.0 per square mile (386.1/km^{2}). The racial makeup of the city was 97.7% White, 0.2% African American, 0.1% Native American, 0.6% Asian, 0.5% from other races, and 0.9% from two or more races. Hispanic or Latino of any race were 1.8% of the population.

There were 402 households, of which 27.4% had children under the age of 18 living with them, 48.3% were married couples living together, 10.2% had a female householder with no husband present, 3.2% had a male householder with no wife present, and 38.3% were non-families. 32.8% of all households were made up of individuals, and 11.2% had someone living alone who was 65 years of age or older. The average household size was 2.19 and the average family size was 2.80.

The median age in the city was 45.4 years. 21.4% of residents were under the age of 18; 6% were between the ages of 18 and 24; 22% were from 25 to 44; 31.4% were from 45 to 64; and 19.2% were 65 years of age or older. The gender makeup of the city was 48.6% male and 51.4% female.

=== 2000 census ===
As of the census of 2000, there were 962 people, 406 households, and 265 families residing in the city. The population density was 2,106.0 inhabitants per square mile (813.1/km^{2}). There were 424 housing units at an average density of 928.2 per square mile (358.4/km^{2}). The racial makeup of the city was 96.78% White, 0.31% African American, 0.10% Native American, 0.42% Asian, 0.10% Pacific Islander, 0.10% from other races, and 2.18% from two or more races. Hispanic or Latino of any race were 1.04% of the population.

There were 406 households, out of which 29.1% had children under the age of 18 living with them, 54.2% were married couples living together, 9.1% had a female householder with no husband present, and 34.7% were non-families. 31.0% of all households were made up of individuals, and 8.9% had someone living alone who was 65 years of age or older. The average household size was 2.37 and the average family size was 3.01.

In the city the population was spread out, with 25.7% under the age of 18, 5.3% from 18 to 24, 27.7% from 25 to 44, 28.0% from 45 to 64, and 13.4% who were 65 years of age or older. The median age was 41 years. For every 100 females there were 89.7 males. For every 100 females age 18 and over, there were 84.3 males.

The median income for a household in the city was $62,667, and the median income for a family was $90,189. Males had a median income of $66,250 versus $37,604 for females. The per capita income for the city was $36,838. About 2.2% of families and 3.7% of the population were below the poverty line, including 0.4% of those under age 18 and 4.9% of those age 65 or over.

== Education ==
The city's public school district is the Clarkston Community School District.

Everest Collegiate High School and Academy is in nearby Independence Township.

== Notable people ==
This list includes people from the area (Clarkston and Independence Township).

- Valerie Bertinelli, actress
- Tim Birtsas, real estate developer, former professional baseball player
- Dan Dickerson, radio play-by-play broadcaster for the Detroit Tigers
- Dane Fife, former basketball player and current assistant coach at Indiana University
- Henry Ford, industrialist and founder of the Ford Motor Company. Maintained a summer home and weekend cottage on Main Street. Ford also owned a mill which operated on the water from what is now called "Mill Pond" in Clarkston. This building still exists in part but has been modernized into a small mall which includes art galleries and office space. He also purchased the old school building on N Main St to serve as an apprentice school.
- John Hardon, Jesuit priest, theologian
- Steve Howe, Major League Baseball pitcher
- Geoff Johns, comic book writer
- Scott Kamieniecki, former professional baseball player
- Tim McCormick, former professional basketball player and current sports broadcaster
- Bob Miller, former professional football player, business owner
- Marisha Pessl, author
- Ryan Riess, professional poker player, 2013 World Series of Poker champion
- Tim Robinson, comedian, former cast member on Saturday Night Live
- Kid Rock, musician
- Ron Serafini, realtor, former professional hockey player
- David Simko, former NASCAR Cup Series driver
- Dahlia Sin, drag queen
- Michael Simko, racing driver
- Izzy Scane , Professional Lacrosse player
