= Michael Simon =

Michael Simon may refer to:

- Michael Simon (ceramic artist) (1947–2021), American ceramic artist
- Michael Simon (DJ) (born 1972), German DJ and musician
- Michael B Simon, American entrepreneur
- Michael H. Simon (born 1956), American attorney and federal judge in the state of Oregon
- Mickaël Simon (born 1987), French rugby league player
- Michael Simon (stage director) (born 1958), German stage director
- Michael A. Simon (born 1960), American television and film director, writer, and producer
- Mike Simon (1883–1963), American Major League Baseball player
- Mikey Simon, main character of the American animated television sitcom Kappa Mikey
- Michael Symon (born 1969), American chef
- Mike Symon (born 1965), Australian politician
- Michael Simon (diplomat) (1901–1976), Israeli diplomat
- Michael Anthony Simon (born 1978), American artist
