= Birmingham, Michigan =

- City
- City of Birmingham
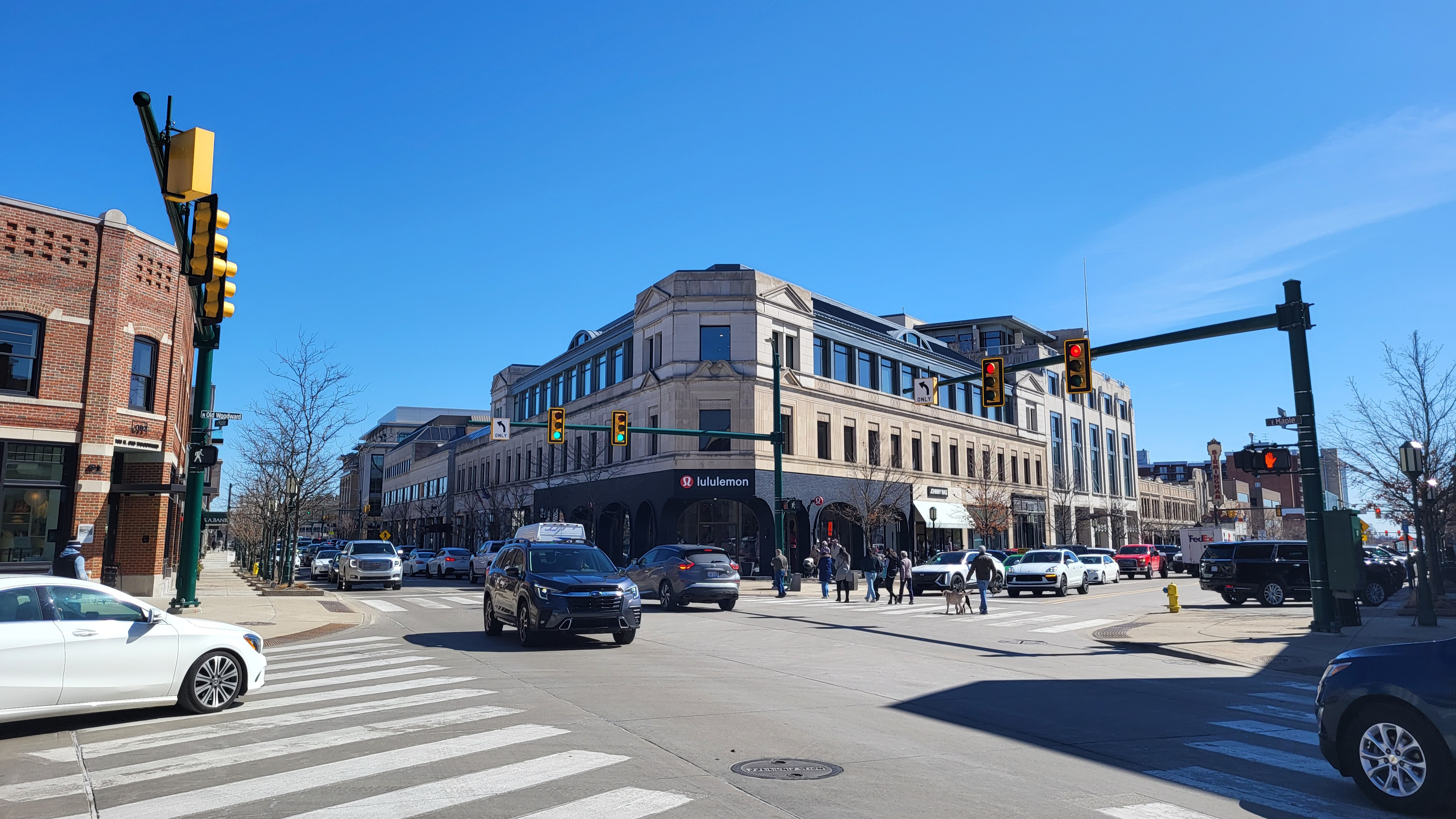
- Maple Road and Old Woodward Avenue
- Motto: "A Walkable Community"
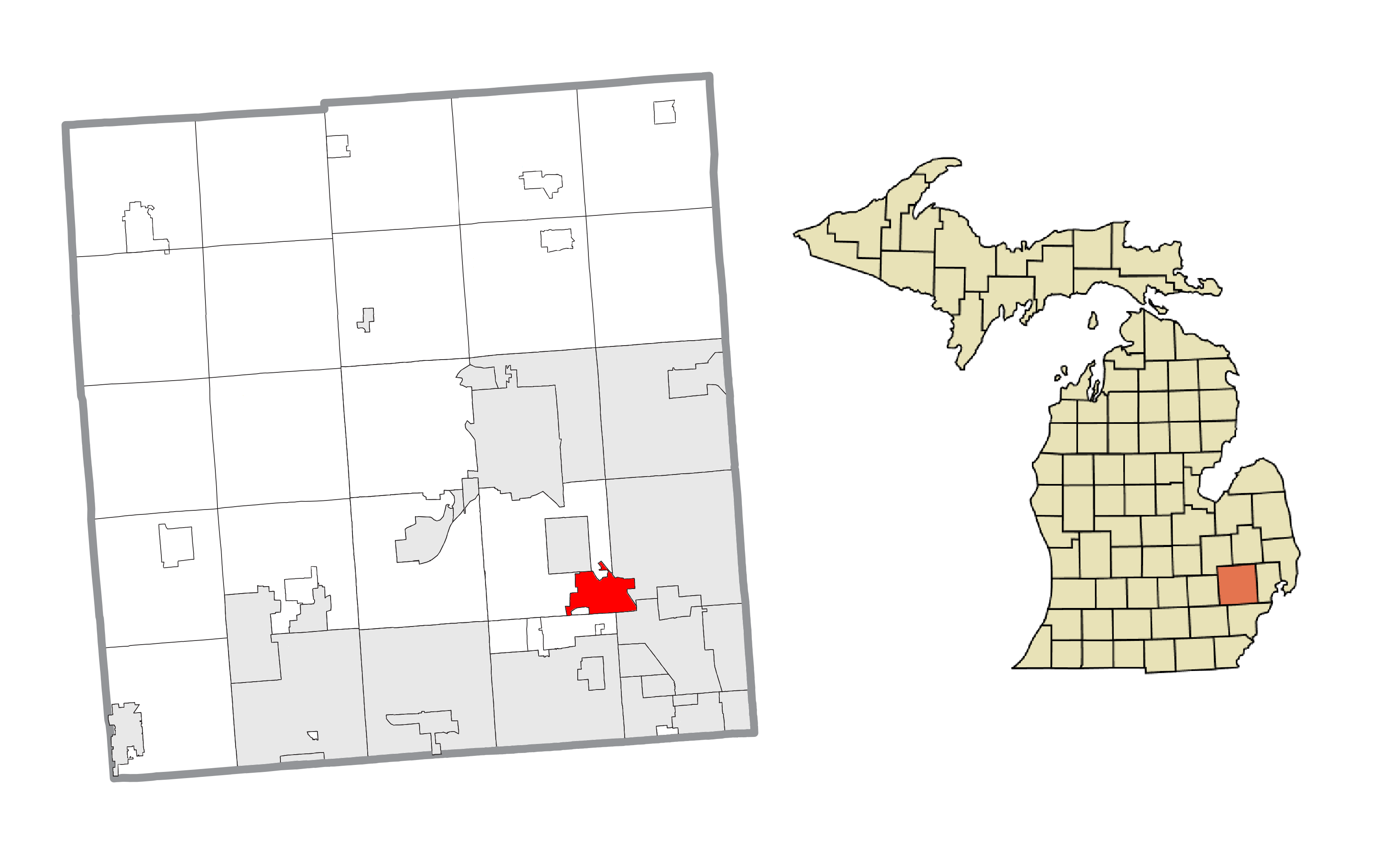
- Location within Oakland County

- Location within the state of Michigan Location within the United States
- Coordinates: 42°32′48″N 83°12′41″W
- Country: United States
- State: Michigan
- County: Oakland
- Settled: 1819
- Incorporated: 1864 (village); 1932 (city)

Government
  - Type: Council–manager
  - Mayor: Therese Longe
  - Clerk: Alexandria Bingham
  - Manager: Jana Ecker

Area
  - Total: 4.81 sq mi (12.45 km^{2})
  - Land: 4.80 sq mi (12.42 km^{2})
  - Water: 0.012 sq mi (0.03 km^{2})
- Elevation: 778 ft (237 m)

Population (2020)
  - Total: 21,813
  - Density: 4,553.86/sq mi (1,758.26/km^{2})
- Time zone: UTC-5 (EST)
  - Summer (DST): UTC-4 (EDT)
- ZIP code(s): 48009, 48012
- Area codes: 248 and 947
- FIPS code: 26-08640
- GNIS feature ID: 0621444
- Website: bhamgov.org

Birmingham is a city in Oakland County in the U.S. state of Michigan. It is a northern suburb of Detroit located along the Woodward Corridor (M-1). As of the 2020 census, Birmingham had a population of 21,813.

== History ==
The area comprising what is now the city of Birmingham was part of land ceded by Native American tribes to the United States government through the 1807 Treaty of Detroit. However, settlement was delayed, first by the War of 1812. Afterward the Surveyor-General of the United States, Edward Tiffin, made an unfavorable report regarding the placement of Military Bounty Lands for veterans of the War of 1812. Tiffin's report claimed that, because of marsh, in this area "There would not be an acre out of a hundred, if there would be one out of a thousand that would, in any case, admit cultivation." In 1818, Territorial Governor Lewis Cass led a group of men along the Indian Trail. The governor's party discovered that the swamp was not as extensive as Tiffin had supposed. Not long after Cass issued a more encouraging report about the land, interest quickened as to its suitability for settlement.

The earliest land entry was made on January 28, 1819, by Colonel Benjamin Kendrick Pierce (brother of future U.S. President Franklin Pierce) for the northwest quarter of section 36. Colonel Pierce visited his land several times, but never settled on it. In March 1818, John W. Hunter and his brother Daniel left Auburn, New York, by sleigh and traveled to Michigan by way of Upper Canada. They waited in Detroit for their father and other family members, who arrived by schooner via Lake Erie in July. The family remained in Detroit until spring 1819, when Hunter made an entry for the northeast quarter of section 36, now in the southeast section of current-day Birmingham. Lacking a proper land survey, Hunter mistakenly built his log house on a tract later purchased by Elijah Willits. That house was later occupied by William Hall, a son-in-law of Elisha Hunter, while John W. Hunter built another log house a short distance to the southeast. On September 25, 1821, Elijah Willits made a land entry for the southwest quarter of section 25. Two days later, Major John Hamilton made an entry for the southeast quarter of section 25. Each of these initial land entries met at what is now the intersection of Maple Road and Pierce Street.

For a time, all three men, John W. Hunter, Hamilton, and Willits, operated hotels and taverns from their houses within a short distance from each other. While Hunter did not continue for very long, Hamilton and Willits continued a rivalry for many years, competing with each other for business from travelers on Woodward Avenue between Detroit and Pontiac. The growing settlement was known variously as "Hamilton's", "Hunter's", or "Willits'"; it was later known as "Piety Hill".

The settlement's original plat was surveyed and recorded on August 25, 1836, in the northwest quarter of section 36, then owned by Rosewell T. Merrill, who also ran the town foundry and the thrashing machine factory. Merrill named his plat "Birmingham" after Birmingham, England; he envisioned that it would also become a great industrial center. Elijah Willits recorded a plat on his property on December 20, 1837. John W. Hunter followed suit with two plats on his property on January 31, 1840, and June 21, 1842, while Major Hamilton laid out a plat on October 7, 1846. Several other properties were subsequently platted as additions. The plats made in 1836 and 1837 were in anticipation of completion of the Detroit and Pontiac Railroad.

Now known as 'Birmingham', the village first received mail through the "Bloomfield" post office. Birmingham established its own post office on April 5, 1838. The settlement incorporated as a village in 1864, comprising the northern half of section 36 and the southern half of section 25, with a total land area of one square mile. The first village elections were held March 1, 1864. It was soon governed by a seven-man board of trustees, who appointed a marshal and a treasurer. Birmingham re-incorporated as a city in 1933. Prior to this, the area just north of 14 Mile along Woodward was known as "Eco City".

The names of the city's founders appear throughout Birmingham in civic institutions and commercial businesses: Pierce Elementary School, Hunter House Hamburgers (which was located on the road formerly known as Hunter Boulevard, which bypassed downtown to the east and was renamed Woodward, with the original Woodward Avenue section renamed Old Woodward), Hamilton Hotel, Willits Building, and Merrill Street. Hall & Hunter Realtors (Established in 1954, now doing business as The Agency Birmingham) adopted their name in honor of the builder and occupier of Birmingham's first home.

== Geography ==
According to the United States Census Bureau, the city has a total area of 4.80 square miles (12.43 km^{2}), of which 4.79 square miles (12.41 km^{2}) is land and 0.01 square miles (0.03 km^{2}) is water.

Birmingham is bordered by Bloomfield Hills on the northwest, Royal Oak on the southeast, Bloomfield Charter Township on the west and north, Southfield Township on the south, and Troy on the northeast.

== Demographics ==
Historical population
Census	Pop.	Note	%±
1880	733		—
1890	899		22.6%
1900	1,170		30.1%
1910	1,607		37.4%
1920	3,694		129.9%
1930	9,539		158.2%
1940	11,196		17.4%
1950	15,467		38.1%
1960	25,525		65.0%
1970	26,170		2.5%
1980	21,689		−17.1%
1990	19,997		−7.8%
2000	19,291		−3.5%
2010	20,103		4.2%
2020	21,813		8.5%
U.S. Decennial Census

=== 2020 census ===
As of the 2020 census, Birmingham had a population of 21,813. The median age was 42.4 years. 22.9% of residents were under the age of 18 and 17.3% of residents were 65 years of age or older. For every 100 females there were 92.7 males, and for every 100 females age 18 and over there were 90.0 males age 18 and over.

100.0% of residents lived in urban areas, while 0.0% lived in rural areas.

There were 9,463 households in Birmingham, of which 29.3% had children under the age of 18 living in them. Of all households, 50.2% were married-couple households, 17.8% were households with a male householder and no spouse or partner present, and 27.9% were households with a female householder and no spouse or partner present. About 34.6% of all households were made up of individuals and 13.7% had someone living alone who was 65 years of age or older.

There were 10,341 housing units, of which 8.5% were vacant. The homeowner vacancy rate was 1.6% and the rental vacancy rate was 11.5%.

Racial composition as of the 2020 census
Race	Number	Percent
White	18,785	86.1%
Black or African American	597	2.7%
American Indian and Alaska Native	36	0.2%
Asian	927	4.2%
Native Hawaiian and Other Pacific Islander	3	0.0%
Some other race	170	0.8%
Two or more races	1,295	5.9%
Hispanic or Latino (of any race)	733	3.4%

=== Education, employment, and income ===
Birmingham enjoys high education rates, with 77.9% of adults having obtained a bachelor's degree, or higher. Birmingham has 11,243 employed people above the age of 16, of which 7,748 are employed in "Management, business, science, and arts" including 3,926 in "Management, business, and financial occupations". Birmingham's median household income is $151,556, and with a median family income of $233,988.

=== Language and nationality ===
English was the sole langage spoken at home in 89.6% of the city's households. Birmingham's residents include 10.8% that are foreign born, 64.1% of whom are naturalized U.S. citizens.

=== 2010 census ===
As of the census of 2010, there were 20,103 people, 9,039 households, and 5,307 families living in the city. The population density was 4,196.9 inhabitants per square mile (1,620.4/km^{2}). There were 9,979 housing units at an average density of 2,083.3 per square mile (804.4/km^{2}). The racial makeup of the city was 92.3% White, 3.0% African American, 0.1% Native American, 2.5% Asian, 0.4% from other races, and 1.6% from two or more races. Hispanic or Latino of any race were 2.1% of the population.

There were 9,039 households, of which 29.8% had children under the age of 18 living with them, 48.4% were married couples living together, 7.6% had a female householder with no husband present, 2.7% had a male householder with no wife present, and 41.3% were non-families. 36.2% of all households were made up of individuals, and 10.8% had someone living alone who was 65 years of age or older. The average household size was 2.22 and the average family size was 2.96.

The median age in the city was 41.1 years. 24.6% of residents were under the age of 18; 3.9% were between the ages of 18 and 24; 27.7% were from 25 to 44; 30.1% were from 45 to 64; and 13.7% were 65 years of age or older. The gender makeup of the city was 48.1% male and 51.9% female.

=== 2000 census ===
As of the census of 2000, there were 19,291 people, 9,131 households, and 5,076 families living in the city. The population density was 4,038.4 inhabitants per square mile (1,559.2/km^{2}). There were 9,700 housing units at an average density of 2,030.6 per square mile (784.0/km^{2}). The racial makeup of the city was 96.13% White, 0.91% African American, 0.15% Native American, 1.50% Asian, 0.04% Pacific Islander, 0.19% from other races, and 1.09% from two or more races. Hispanic or Latino of any race were 1.19% of the population.

There were 9,131 households, out of which 24.7% had children under the age of 18 living with them, 47.6% were married couples living together, 6.1% had a female householder with no husband present, and 44.4% were non-families. 38.0% of all households were made up of individuals, and 10.1% had someone living alone who was 65 years of age or older. The average household size was 2.11 and the average family size was 2.85.

In the city the population was spread out, with 21.2% under the age of 18, 3.9% from 18 to 24, 34.9% from 25 to 44, 26.0% from 45 to 64, and 14.0% who were 65 years of age or older. The median age was 39 years. For every 100 females, there were 91.5 males. For every 100 females age 18 and over, there were 88.2 males.

The median income for a household in the city was $80,861, and the median income for a family was $110,627. Males had a median income of $78,865 versus $51,834 for females. The per capita income for the city was $59,314. About 1.6% of families and 2.9% of the population were below the poverty line, including 2.5% of those under age 18 and 3.3% of those age 65 or over.

== Arts and culture ==
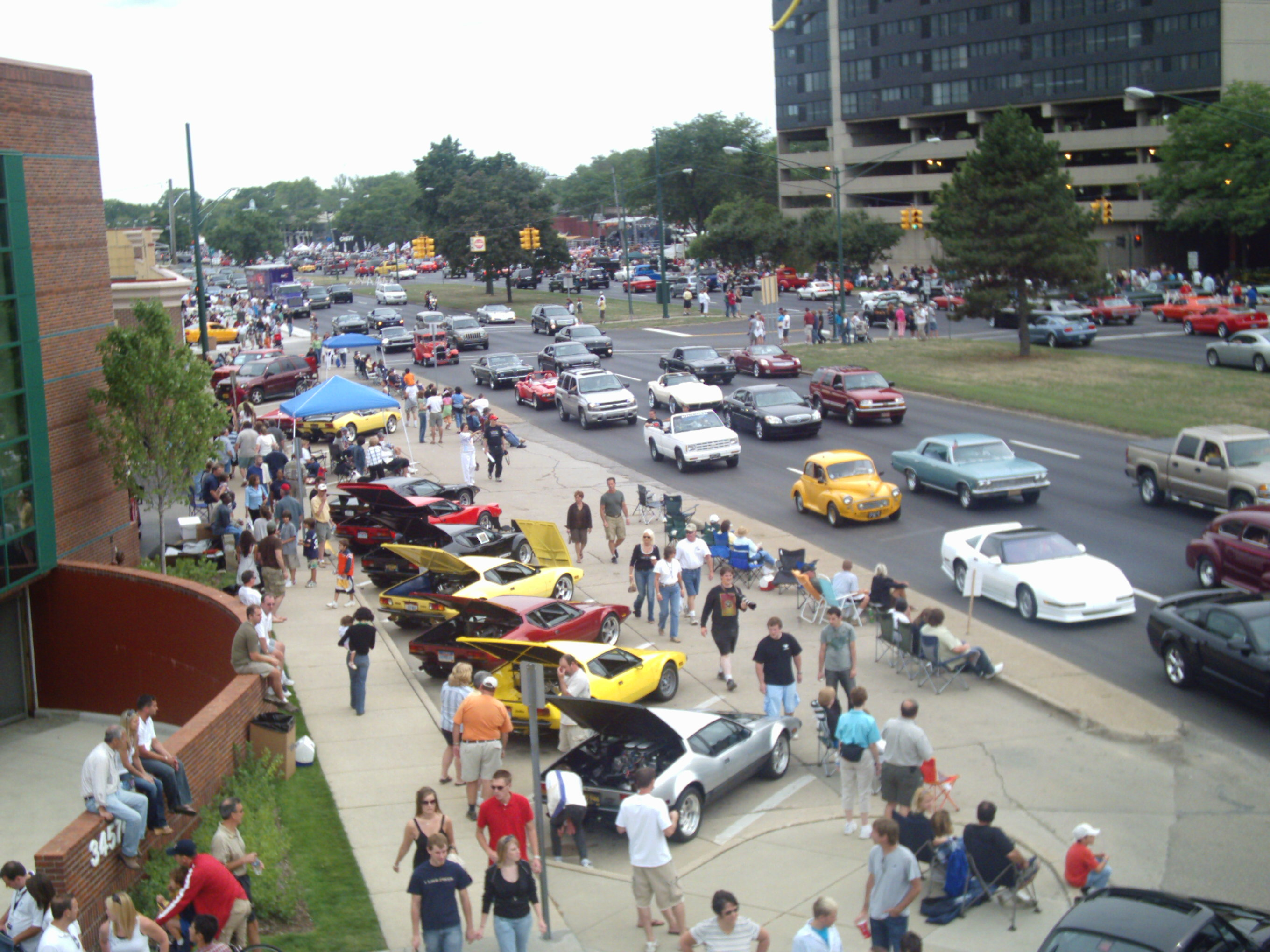
Woodward Dream Cruise

Settlers founded the First United Methodist Church in 1821 and conducted services in Elijah Willets' tavern. Its current structure was built in 1839; it is now the oldest church building in the city. Other houses of worship represent many religions.

George H. Mitchell and Almeron Whitehead were two of a small group of bachelors who had formed a club called The Eccentrics; they published a newspaper of the same name, issuing the first edition on May 2, 1878. At a price of 2 cents, The Eccentric provided a "live home paper, replete with all the news of the day", with considerable emphasis on the "local items of importance occurring in Birmingham and immediate vicinity". By the turn of the 20th century, The Eccentric ran advertisements for Detroit stores and theaters, as well as offers of property and houses suitable for the "commuter". In the 1920s, the slogan of The Eccentric was "For a Bigger and Better Birmingham". Today, the Birmingham Eccentric newspaper continues its role as reporter of the community's local news.

In 1923, a group of friends formed The Village Players of Birmingham, a private theatre club. Originally, performances were given in the community house. In 1928 the group commissioned their own theater just outside the downtown area. Today this all-volunteer group is open to everyone and puts on five shows each year.

Birmingham's Community House, opened in 1923, is located in downtown Birmingham. It is a non-sectarian, non-partisan venue used for meetings, banquets, weddings and other celebrations.

In 2008, the Birmingham Little League won the nine- to ten-year-old Little League state championship. The team beat Western Little League 12–5 to earn the title.

=== Parks and recreation ===
The city has more than twenty parks, with many amenities, including tennis and pickleball courts, baseball diamonds, playgrounds, golf courses, sledding hills, nature trails, picnic areas, and deep woods. Shain Park, the city's main commons, is the site of the Village Fair, art shows, summer music concerts and numerous community events. At the center stands Freedom of the Human Spirit sculpted by Marshall Fredericks.

=== Education ===
The Birmingham City School District administers several nationally accredited schools, including Seaholm High School and Groves High School. Roeper School has a campus on Adams Road.

The Holy Name School is a co-educational parochial school founded by the Roman Catholic Holy Name Church. It educates children grades pre-K to 8. The private school was established in 1928, along with a convent for IHM nuns. (That has since closed.) The church and school continue to operate in conjunction today.

Pierce Elementary School in Birmingham provides classes for elementary school students of the French School of Detroit.

The Japanese School of Detroit (JSD), a supplementary school for Japanese citizens, first began holding classes in Birmingham in 1987, when its operation at Seaholm High started. It began holding classes at Covington School in 1989, and it also had classes at West Maple Elementary. At one point its school offices were in Birmingham. In 2010 the school announced it was moving its operations to Novi.

=== Public library ===
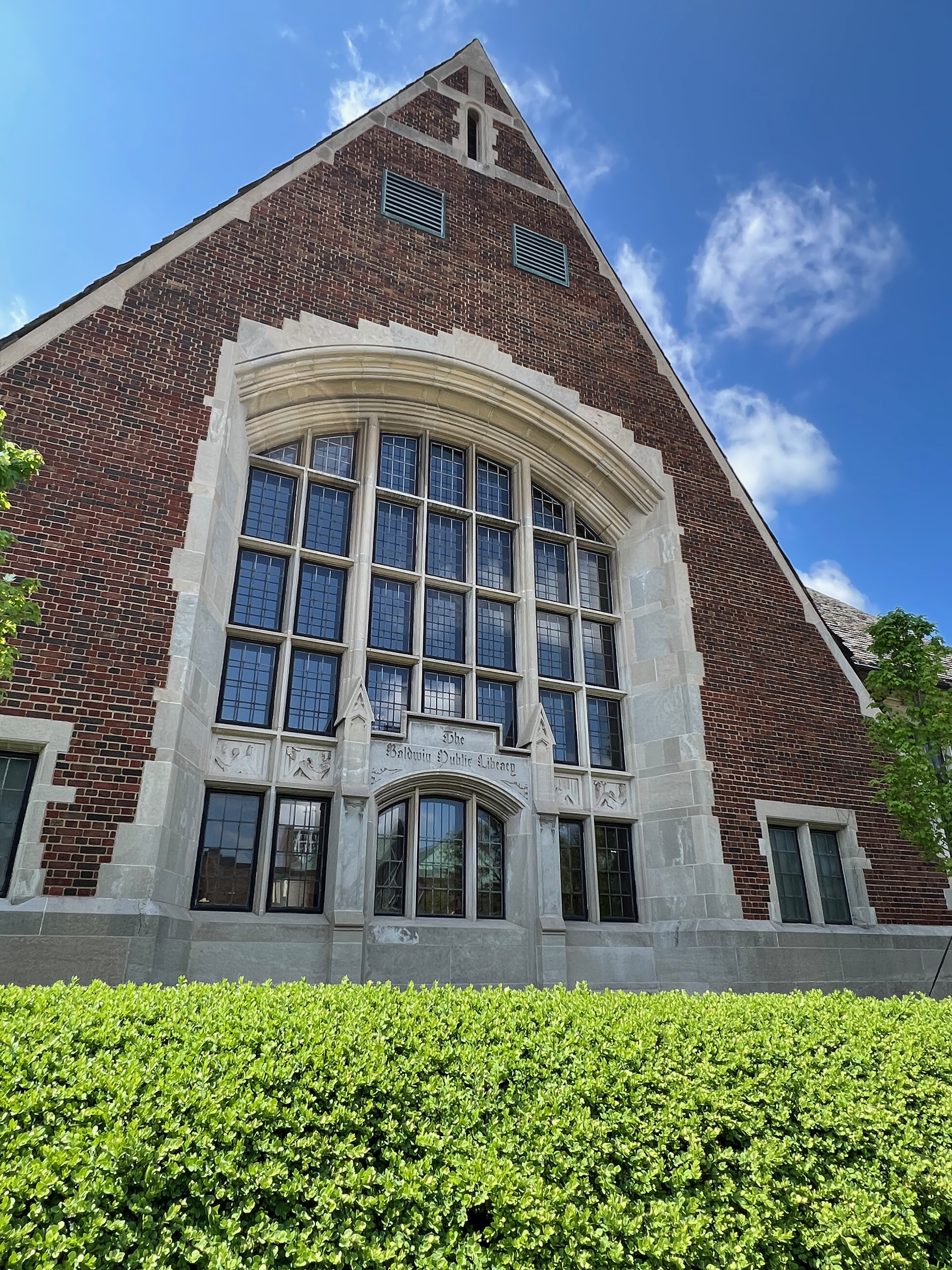
Baldwin Birmingham Public Library

The Baldwin Public Library serves the city of Birmingham and nearby communities of Beverly Hills, Bingham Farms, and Bloomfield Hills. The original building first opened to the public on December 19, 1927. In October 1959, an extension for the Youth Department was added to the east side of the building. In 1983, another addition opened, changing the entrance to Merrill Street. There are over 120,000 books in the library, along with CDs, DVDs, periodicals, educational toys, databases and free Wi-Fi.

The library is named after Martha Baldwin, a civic leader and lifelong resident of Birmingham who was instrumental in establishing the first library. She also helped get improvements such as sidewalks laid for the business section, street lights, seats placed at interurban transit stops, flowers and trees planted, and trash baskets placed at the street corners.

== Infrastructure ==
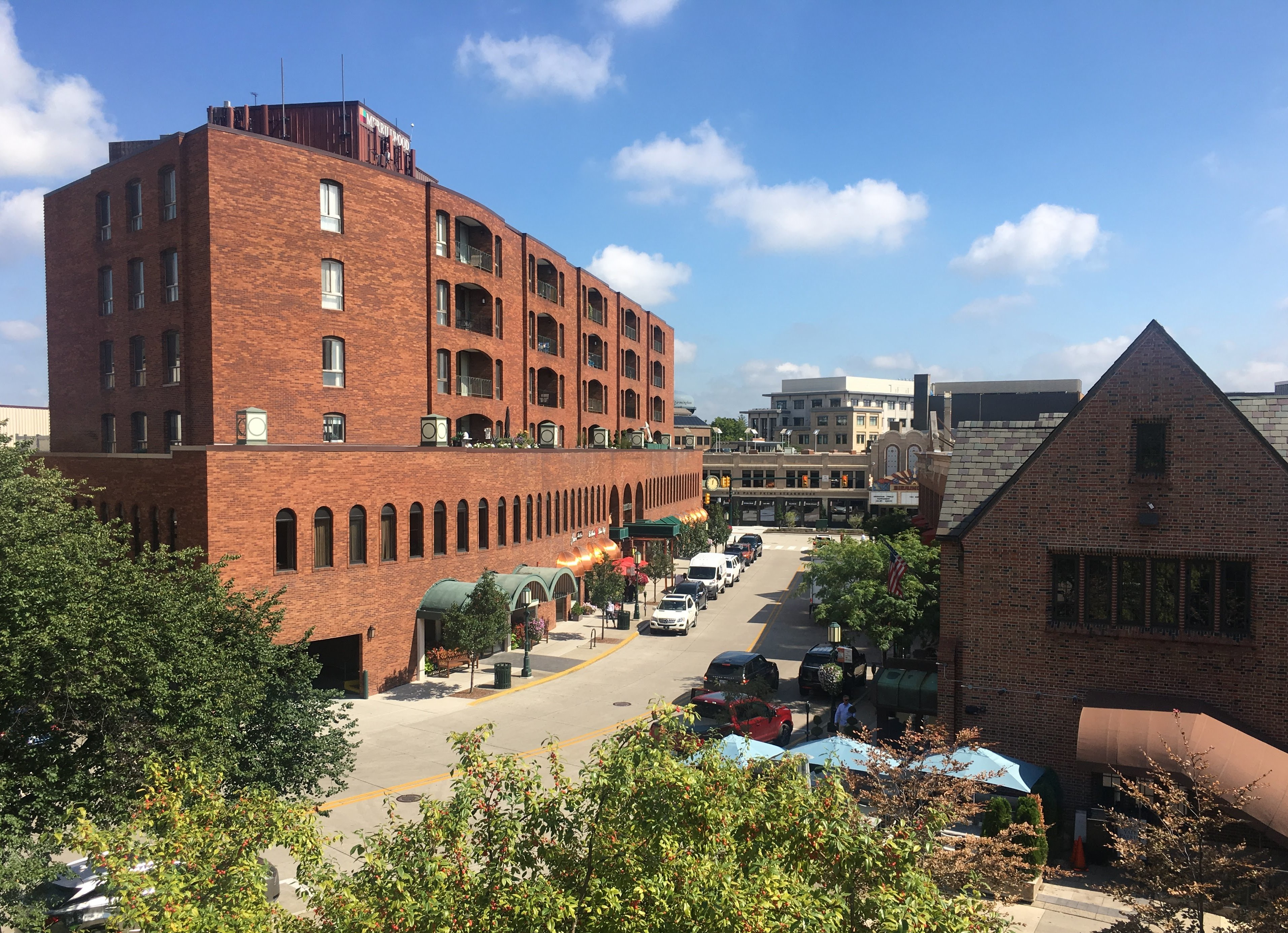
Merrill Street, with Merrillwood Apartments on left

=== Transportation ===
Birmingham was a stagecoach stop in the 19th century between Detroit and Pontiac. In 1839, the railroad tracks were extended to Birmingham with two steam trains a day running to Detroit.

On June 18, 1896, the Oakland Railway, the electric interurban, was constructed to Birmingham; it provided service to Detroit in 40 minutes. This service ended in 1931 as many passengers switched to the commuter rail and automobiles.

Amtrak provides long-distance passenger rail service on the Pontiac–Detroit–Chicago Wolverine. It stops in Birmingham three times per day in each direction at the Birmingham, Michigan Amtrak station. Class one freight rail service is provided by Canadian National Railway (CN).

By 1931, the Grand Trunk Western Railroad (GTW) moved the railroad tracks to their present location. It provided commuter rail service from Pontiac to downtown Detroit with a stop in Birmingham. The Southeastern Michigan Transportation Authority (SEMTA) took control of this service in 1974 but it was ended on October 17, 1983, after subsidies were discontinued. Efforts continue to this day to restore such service.

In the 21st century, the Suburban Mobility Authority for Regional Transportation (SMART) and the Regional Transit Authority (RTA) operate local and regional bus transit.

== Notable people ==
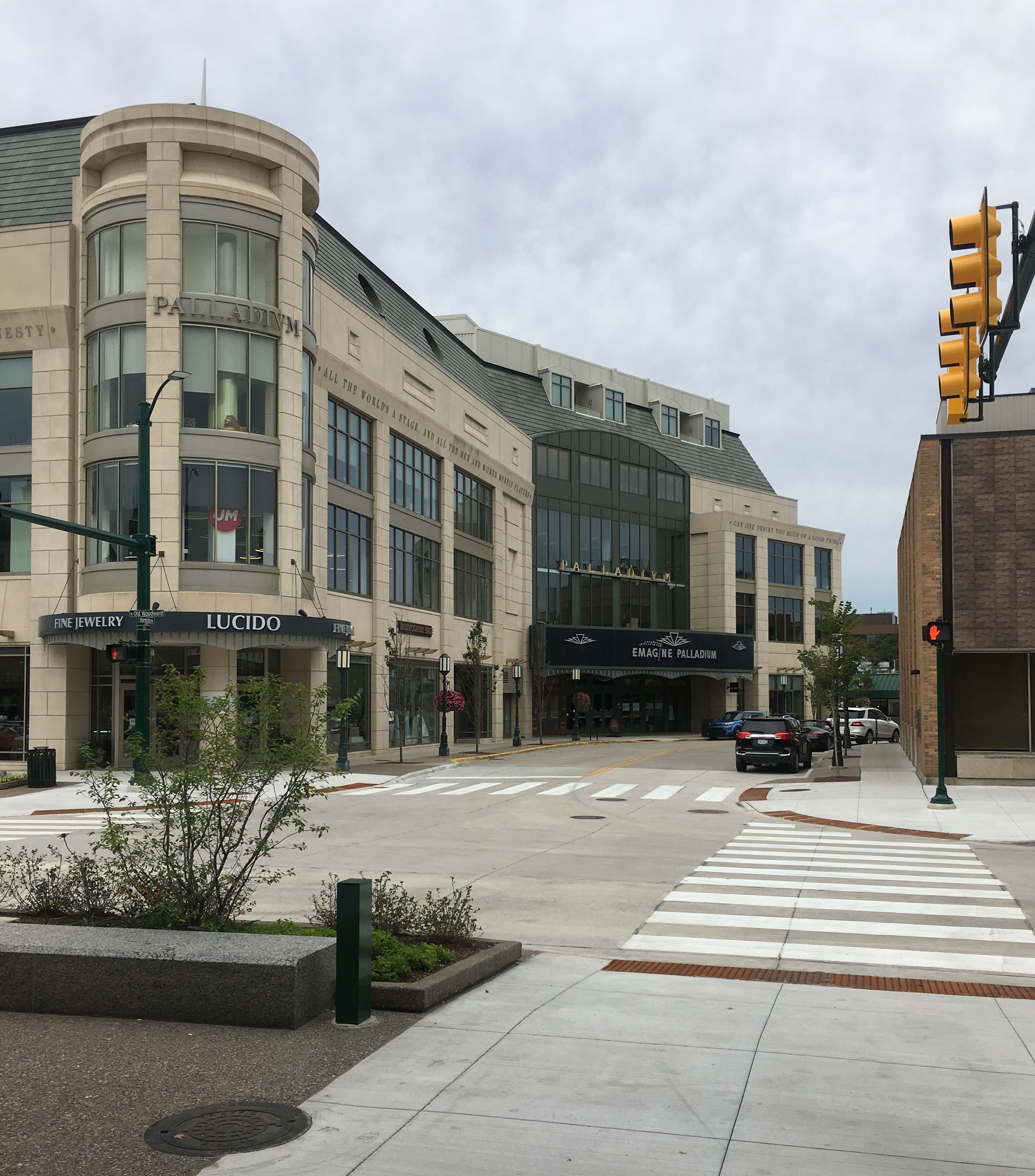
Hamilton Street and Old Woodward Avenue, with Palladium Building on left

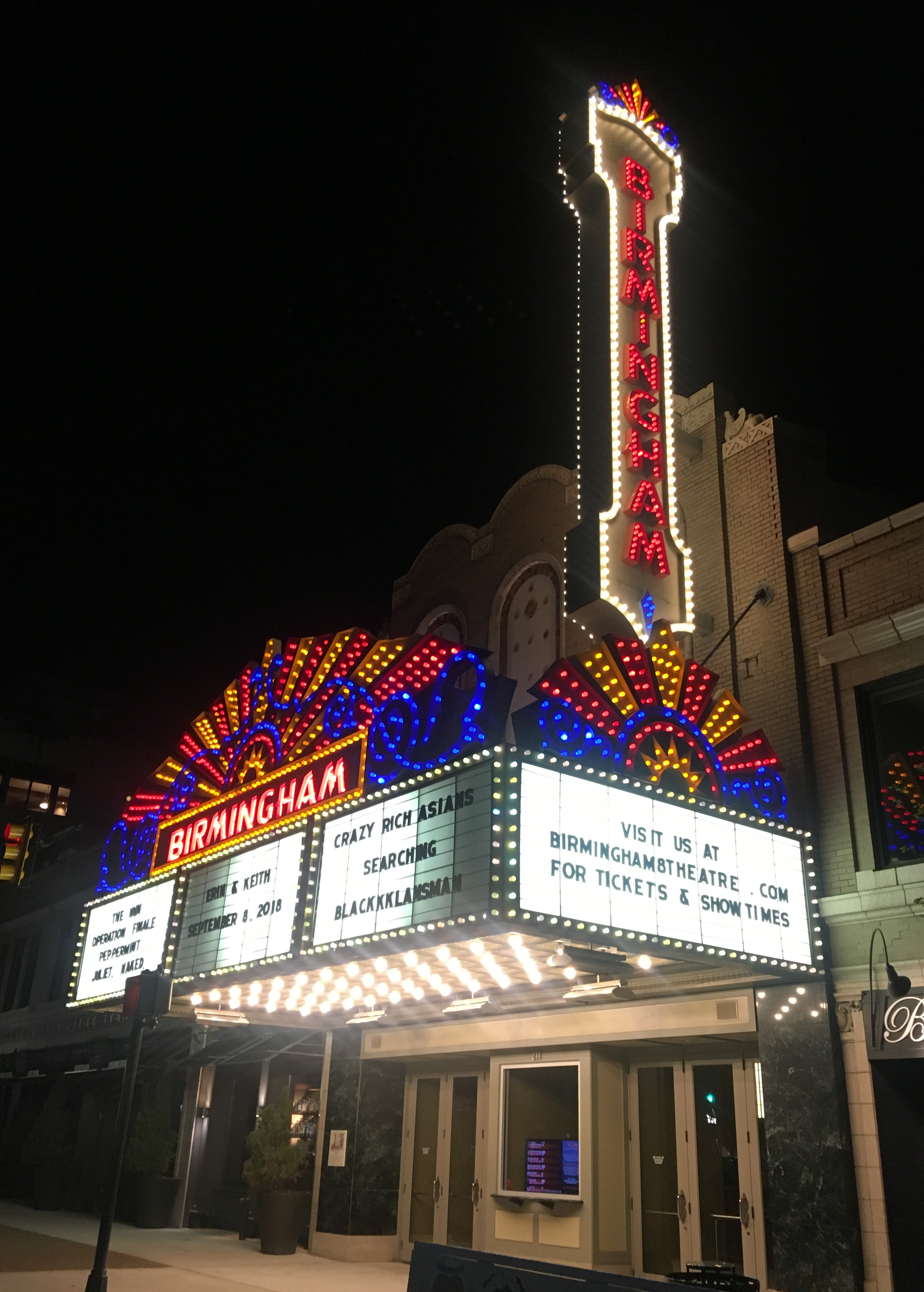
Birmingham Theatre on South Old Woodward Avenue

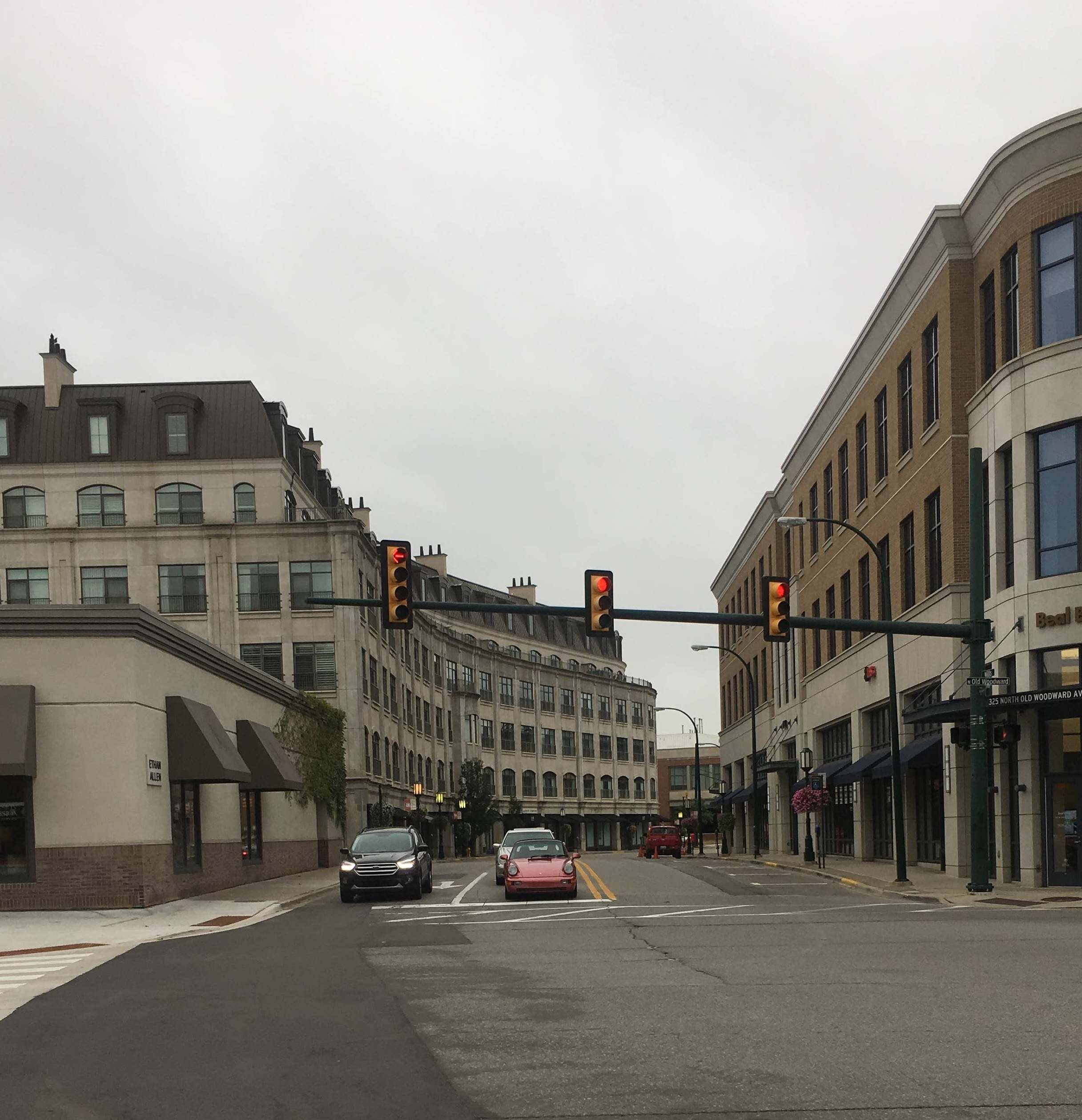
Willits Street, with The Willits on left

- Tim Allen, actor (raised in Birmingham)
- Tom Barrett, politician
- Shane Battier, basketball player for four NBA teams
- Mike Binder, film director, screenwriter and actor
- Randal Bryant, dean, Carnegie Mellon School of Computer Science
- Elaine Crosby, pro golfer
- Patricia Ellis, 1930s film actress, born in Birmingham
- Virgil Exner, automobile designer and creator of the 1958 Plymouth Fury in Christine
- Marshall Fredericks, sculptor and creator of The Spirit of Detroit
- Wallace Frost, architect
- Pat Gillick, Baseball Hall of Famer
- Clarence Dayton Hillman, businessman
- Laura Innes, actress (attended Seaholm High School)
- Justin Ishbia, businessman
- Mat Ishbia, businessman
- Calvin Johnson, former NFL wide receiver
- Christine Lahti, Emmy-winning, Oscar-nominated actress
- Alexi Lalas, soccer player
- Anita Lo, restaurateur
- Kurt Luedtke, journalist and Oscar award-winning screenwriter
- Michael J. Malik Sr., businessman
- Alonzo L. McDonald business man and philanthropist
- Gerald S. McGowan, US ambassador to Portugal
- Ruth McNamee, Michigan state legislator and Mayor of Birmingham
- Steve Morrison, pro football linebacker
- Meg Oliver, anchor of CBS's Up to the Minute
- Mike Posner, singer
- Sam Raimi, film director (attended Groves High School)
- Andy Roeser, former president of NBA's Los Angeles Clippers
- Max Sasson, professional hockey player with the Vancouver Canucks
- Kurt Schottenheimer, former NFL assistant coach
- Alexandra Silber, actor and singer
- Sam Simon, founder of Atlas Oil and owner of the Halifax Mooseheads
- David Spade, actor and comedian
- Haley Stevens, politician
- Paul Stookey, member of the trio Peter, Paul, and Mary
- Elaine Stritch, actress and vocalist
- Tom Tjaarda, automobile designer (attended Seaholm High School)
- Tom Tracy, pro football running back
- Dave Trott, US congressman
- Florence Signaigo Wagner (1919–2019), botanist who served as president of the American Fern Society
- Jude Wellings, soccer player
- Minoru Yamasaki, architect and designer of the World Trade Center
- Sheila Young, Olympic gold-winning speed skater and track cyclist

== See also ==
- Townsend Hotel
- Woodward Corridor
