= Sha Carter =

American basketball player (born 2000)

No. 20 – Phoenix Mercury
- Position: Forward
- League: WNBA

Personal information
- Born: October 25, 2000 (age 26) Southfield, Michigan, U.S.
- Listed height: 5 ft 11 in (1.80 m)

Career information
- High school: Wylie E. Groves (Beverly Hills, Michigan)
- College: Walsh (2018–2022); Florida Gulf Coast (2022–2023)
- Playing career: 2026–present

Career history
- 2026–present: Phoenix Mercury

Career highlights
- 2× G-MAC Player of the Year (2020, 2022); 4× First-Team All-G-MAC (2019-2022); 3× G-MAC All-Defense Team (2020-2022)
- Stats at WNBA.com
- Stats at Basketball Reference

Quionche Collianna Laneshay Carter (born October 25, 2000) is an American professional basketball player for the Phoenix Mercury of the Women's National Basketball Association (WNBA). She played college basketball for the Walsh Cavaliers and Florida Gulf Coast Eagles.

== Early life ==
Carter attended Wylie E. Groves High School in Beverly Hills, Michigan, where she competed in basketball, soccer and track. During her senior year she averaged 21.5 points per game.

== College career ==
Carter began her college basketball career with the Walsh Cavaliers. During the 2018–19 season, in her freshman year, she appeared in all 31 games, with 30 starts, and led the team in scoring with 17.1 points per game. She ranked second in the Great Midwest Athletic Conference (G-MAC) in scoring and field goal percentage. Following the season she was named first-team all-G-MAC.

During the 2019–20 season, in her sophomore year, she started all 30 games and averaged 18.8 points, 7.4 rebounds, 2.7 assists and 2.1 steals per game. She led the GMAC in scoring, total points (563) and field goal percentage (.579). She led her team to the GMAC tournament title with 21 points, nine rebounds and three assists against Kentucky Wesleyan in the championship game. Following the season she was named the Great Midwest Athletic Conference Player of the Year, first-team All-G-MAC and G-MAC all-defense team.

During the 2020–21 season, in her junior year, she started 24 games and averaged 16.8 points, 8.2 rebounds, 3.0 assists and 1.9 steals per game. On March 12, 2021, during the opening-round of the 2021 NCAA Division II women's basketball tournament against Cedarville, she recorded 23 points, a career-high 19 rebounds and ten assists, for her first career triple-double, and second in program history. Following the season she was named to the first-team All-G-MAC and G-MAC all-defense team.

During the 2021–22 season, in her senior year, she started all 33 games and averaged 18.8 points, 8.8 rebounds, 3.0 assists and 2.2 steals per game. She led the conference with 19.0 points per game while ranking second in field goal percentage and fourth in rebounding. She averaged a league-best 19.5 points and was third in rebounding in conference play. Following the season she was named G-MAC Player of the Year, first-team All-G-MAC and G-MAC all-defense team. She achieved new program single-season records for points (622) and field goals made (251). She became the first player in program history to reach 2,000 career points.

On May 12, 2022, Carter transferred to Florida Gulf Coast. She finished her NCAA Division II career with a Walsh program record 2,116 points, and helped lead the Cavaliers to two Great Midwest Athletic Conference championships and three NCAA Tournament appearances.

== Professional career ==
On March 17, 2025, Carter signed with Al Riyadi Beirut. On April 12, 2026, she signed a one-year contract with the Phoenix Mercury of the WNBA. She made the Mercury's opening day roster. On July 7, 2026, she was waived by the Mercury. She signed a developmental contract with the Mercury two days later.
