= Jaden Mangham =

American football player (born 2003)

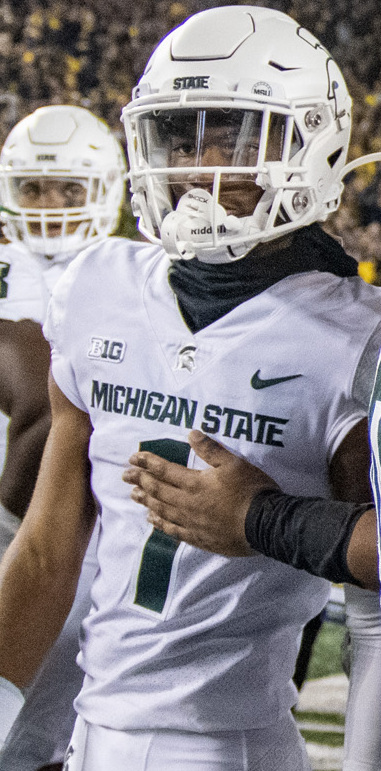
- Mangham with Michigan State in 2022

No. 2 – Purdue Boilermakers
- Position: Safety
- Class: Senior

Personal information
- Born: September 3, 2003 (age 23)
- Listed height: 6 ft 2 in (1.88 m)
- Listed weight: 210 lb (95 kg)

Career information
- High school: Wylie E. Groves (Beverly Hills, Michigan)
- College: Michigan State (2022–2023); Michigan (2024–2025); Purdue (2026–present)
- Stats at ESPN

Jaden Mangham (born September 3, 2003) is an American college football safety for the Purdue Boilermakers. He previously played for the Michigan State Spartans and Michigan Wolverines.

== Early life ==
Mangham was born on September 3, 2003, the son of Jesse and Kali Mangham. He attended Wylie E. Groves High School in Beverly Hills, Michigan, recording 25 receptions for 450 yards and eight touchdowns as a junior. He was rated as a four-star recruit and the 7th best prospect in the state of Michigan in the class of 2022. Mangham received 36 scholarship offers and committed to play college football at Michigan State University over Alabama, Michigan, Notre Dame, Penn State, Florida State, Miami and Oregon.

== College career ==
=== Michigan State ===
As a freshman in 2022, Mangham notched 20 tackles in eight games. In 2023, he started 10 games, recording 53 tackles, one for a loss, seven pass deflections, four interceptions and a fumble recovery, earning an All-Big Ten Conference honorable mention. After two seasons at Michigan State, Mangham entered the NCAA transfer portal.

=== Michigan ===
On May 17, 2024, Mangham transferred to the University of Michigan. He missed the 2024 season due to an injury.

== Personal life ==
Mangham’s father, Jesse, played linebacker for Bowling Green from 1989 to 1992. His older brother, Jaren, was a running back for Minnesota, Colorado, South Florida and Michigan State.
