= Bingham Farms, Michigan =

- Village
- Village of Bingham Farms
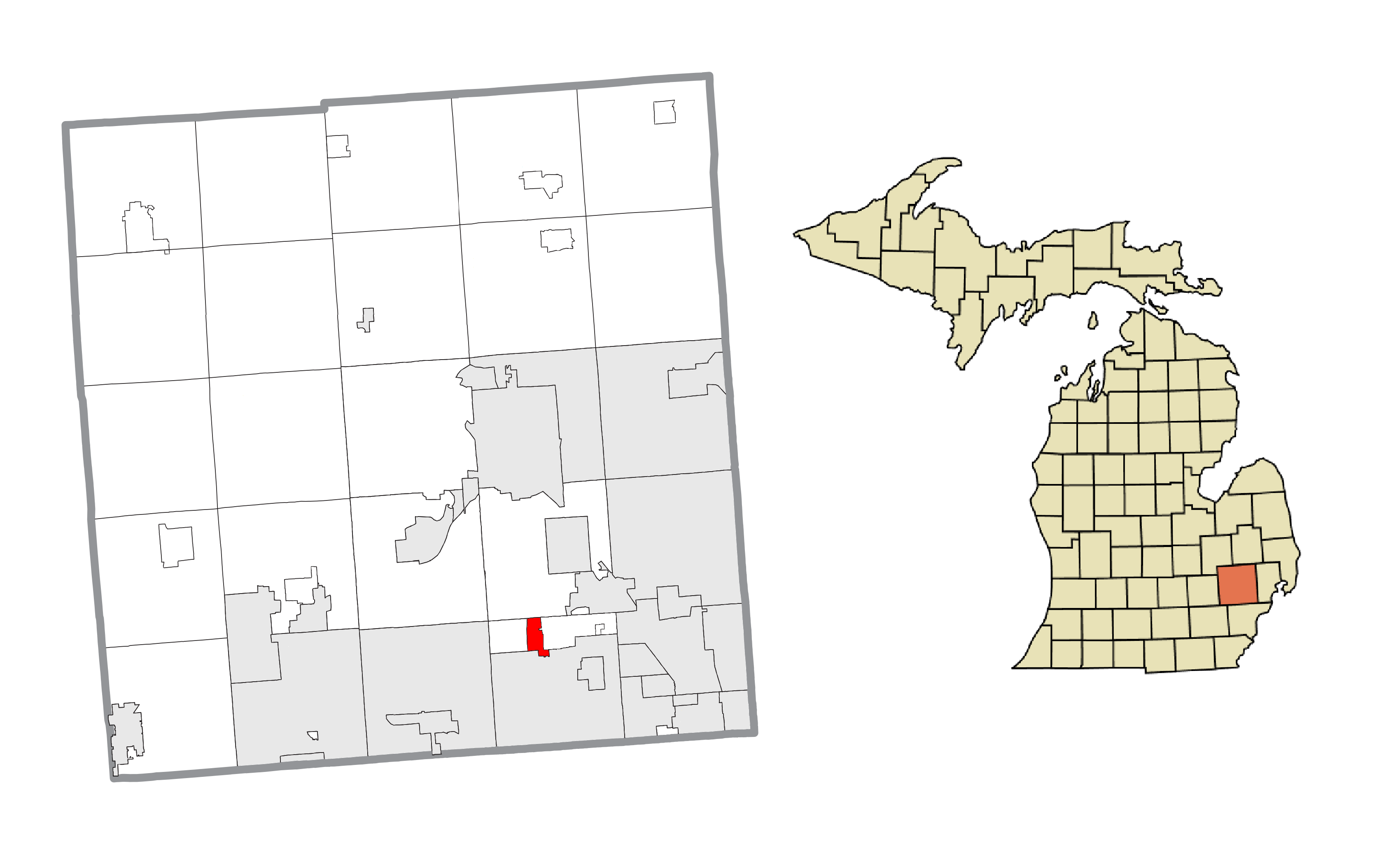
- Location within Oakland County

- Location within the state of Michigan Location within the United States
- Coordinates: 42°31′3″N 83°16′40″W
- Country: United States
- State: Michigan
- County: Oakland
- Township: Southfield
- Incorporated: 1955

Government
  - President: Bob Templeton

Area
  - Total: 1.22 sq mi (3.15 km^{2})
  - Land: 1.22 sq mi (3.15 km^{2})
  - Water: 0 sq mi (0.00 km^{2})
- Elevation: 712 ft (217 m)

Population (2020)
  - Total: 1,124
  - Density: 925.5/sq mi (357.34/km^{2})
- Time zone: UTC-5 (Eastern (EST))
  - Summer (DST): UTC-4 (EDT)
- ZIP code(s): 48025
- Area codes: 248
- FIPS code: 26-08460
- GNIS feature ID: 2398123
- Website: Official website

Bingham Farms is a village in Oakland County in the U.S. state of Michigan. A northern suburb of Detroit, Bingham Farms is located within Southfield Township, roughly 20 miles (32.2 km) northwest of downtown Detroit. As of the 2020 census, the village had a population of 1,124.

== History ==
Originally settled in 1823 by John Daniels of Rutland, Vermont, the tiny settlement in what was soon to become Southfield Township in 1830 would stay isolated and small until Telegraph Road was brought through the area in 1928. In the early 1950s, citizens in the southern part of the township sought to have the entire township incorporated as a city. Seeking to retain their individual characters and guard against annexation, the settlements in the northern end raced to incorporate as villages. Bingham Farms was incorporated on October 4, 1955, named after a prominent family present in the village since 1880. All roads in the village remained unpaved until 1984 to discourage intensive development.

== Geography ==
According to the United States Census Bureau, the village has a total area of 1.21 square miles (3.13 km^{2}), all land.

== Government ==
=== Federal, state, and county legislators ===
United States House of Representatives
District	Representative	Party	Since
12th	Rashida Tlaib	Democratic	2023

Michigan Senate
District	Senator	Party	Since
7th	Jeremy Moss	Democratic	2023

Michigan House of Representatives
District	Representative	Party	Since
19th	Samantha Steckloff	Democratic	2023

Oakland County Board of Commissioners
District	Commissioner	Party	Since
18	Linnie Taylor	Democratic	2023

== Demographics ==
Historical population
Census	Pop.	Note	%±
1960	394		—
1970	566		43.7%
1980	529		−6.5%
1990	1,001		89.2%
2000	1,030		2.9%
2010	1,111		7.9%
2020	1,124		1.2%
U.S. Decennial Census

=== 2010 census ===
As of the census of 2010, there were 1,111 people, 527 households, and 332 families living in the village. The population density was 918.2 inhabitants per square mile (354.5/km^{2}). There were 549 housing units at an average density of 453.7 per square mile (175.2/km^{2}). The racial makeup of the village was 85.2% White, 7.6% African American, 0.2% Native American, 4.4% Asian, 0.7% from other races, and 1.9% from two or more races. Hispanic or Latino of any race were 0.9% of the population.

There were 527 households, of which 16.1% had children under the age of 18 living with them, 58.1% were married couples living together, 3.4% had a female householder with no husband present, 1.5% had a male householder with no wife present, and 37.0% were non-families. 33.4% of all households were made up of individuals, and 24.1% had someone living alone who was 65 years of age or older. The average household size was 2.11 and the average family size was 2.67.

The median age in the village was 59.7 years. 15.2% of residents were under the age of 18; 2.7% were between the ages of 18 and 24; 9.8% were from 25 to 44; 33.1% were from 45 to 64; and 39.1% were 65 years of age or older. The gender makeup of the village was 47.3% male and 52.7% female.

=== 2000 census ===
As of the census of 2000, there were 1,030 people, 445 households, and 339 families living in the village. The population density was 858.2 inhabitants per square mile (331.4/km^{2}). There were 477 housing units at an average density of 397.4 per square mile (153.4/km^{2}). The racial makeup of the village was 91.46% White, 5.44% African American, 1.46% Asian, 0.19% from other races, and 1.46% from two or more races. Hispanic or Latino of any race were 0.49% of the population.

There were 445 households, out of which 19.6% had children under the age of 18 living with them, 71.0% were married couples living together, 3.1% had a female householder with no husband present, and 23.6% were non-families. 20.7% of all households were made up of individuals, and 11.9% had someone living alone who was 65 years of age or older. The average household size was 2.31 and the average family size was 2.65.

In the village, the population was spread out, with 15.9% under the age of 18, 2.9% from 18 to 24, 16.0% from 25 to 44, 36.6% from 45 to 64, and 28.5% who were 65 years of age or older. The median age was 53 years. For every 100 females, there were 100.0 males. For every 100 females age 18 and over, there were 92.4 males.

The median income for a household in the village was $123,771, and the median income for a family was $138,806. Males had a median income of $100,000 versus $55,556 for females. The per capita income for the village was $74,588. None of the families and 0.9% of the population were living below the poverty line, including no under eighteens and none of those over 64.

== Education ==
Students are zoned to the Birmingham City School District. Bingham Farms Elementary School is in Bingham Farms.

The French School of Detroit (FSD) holds its middle school classes at Berkshire Middle School in neighboring Beverly Hills. Bingham Farms Elementary School provides classes for FSD elementary school students.

== Business ==
The Bingham Farms Office District extends from the east side of Telegraph Road, comprising a mix of two and four-storey buildings. Businesses include the headquarters of Global Commercial Credit.
