= Seaholm High School =

High school in Michigan, United States

Ernest W. Seaholm High School

Location
- 2436 West Lincoln Street; Birmingham, Michigan 48009; United States; 42°32′20″N 83°14′41″W

Information
- Other name: Seaholm High School
- Type: Magnet high school
- Established: 1951; 75 years ago
- School district: Birmingham Public Schools
- NCES School ID: 260585004217
- Principal: Michael Wicker
- Teaching staff: 79.37 (on an FTE basis)
- Grades: 9–12
- Enrollment: 1,154 (2023-2024)
- Student to teacher ratio: 14.54
- Colors: Maroon and white
- Athletics conference: Oakland Activities Association
- Mascot: Maple Leaf
- Nickname: Maples
- Newspaper: The Highlander
- Yearbook: The Piper
- Website: seaholm.birmingham.k12.mi.us

Student assessments
- 2021–22 school year Change vs. prior year

M-STEP 11th grade proficiency rates (Science / Social Studies)
- Advanced %: 32.1 / 18.0
- Proficient %: 34.3 / 40.9
- PR. Proficient %: 13.0 / 32.8
- Not Proficient %: 20.7 / 8.4

Average test scores
- SAT Total: 1300 (▲ +46.8)

Ernest W. Seaholm High School (simply referred to as Seaholm High School) is a magnet high school in Birmingham, Michigan, United States. It was established in 1951 and is part of the Birmingham Public Schools district.

== History ==
Seaholm opened in 1951 under the name Birmingham High School. At the time, the Board of Education President was Ernest W. Seaholm (retired Chief Engineer for Cadillac) and the treasurer was Wylie E. Groves. Birmingham's two high schools are now named for them: Seaholm High School and Groves High School. Birmingham High School's first principal was Ross Wagner. John Schulz served as the next principal (1968–1979), Jim Wallendorf followed, serving from 1979 to 1992. The current serving principal is Micheal Wicker.

At one time Seaholm High School hosted classes of grades 4 through 12 of the Japanese School of Detroit, a supplementary Japanese school. In 2010, the JSD announced that it was relocating to Novi, Michigan; it moved in mid-2011.

== Programs ==
The Forensics Team has consistently enjoyed success at the state-finalist level. Quiz Bowl team has also had success, winning a national championship in 1991 at the American Scholastics Competition Network Tournament of Champions and a state championship in 1994.

The student newspaper, the Seaholm Highlander, has won multiple prestigious Spartan Awards from the Michigan Interscholastic Press Association.

The Flexible Scheduling Program, which involved a seven teacher team that created a series of interdisciplinary social studies/humanities courses with flexible schedules, began in the 1960s. They may be taken in lieu of standard English and social studies classes. Students are permitted to teach courses themselves. According to the Christian Science Monitor, the reduction in bureaucracy, interaction and collaboration between teachers, the interdisciplinary nature, and flexible time schedules made the program attractive.

== Notable alumni ==
- Tim Allen, actor and comedian
- Paris Bass, pro basketball player
- Jim Benton, illustrator and writer
- Mike Binder, film director, screenwriter, producer, and actor
- Randal Bryant, computer scientist and academic
- Charlie Burg, singer-songwriter
- John N. Damoose, politician and former documentary producer
- Daniel L. Doctoroff, businessman and former government official
- Patrick Grant, composer
- Troy Hairston, fullback for the Houston Texans
- Jordan Harbinger, radio personality, podcaster, voice actor, journalist, lawyer and businessman
- Beth Hayes (1955–1984), economist
- Laura Innes, actress and television director
- Justin Ishbia, billionaire investor and owner of multiple American sports teams
- Mat Ishbia, owner of the Phoenix Suns
- Haley Kopmeyer, professional soccer player
- Christine Lahti, actress and filmmaker
- Mari Manoogian, politician
- Joey Pecoraro, grammy nominated musician and record producer
- Michael B Simon, entrepreneur
- Haley Stevens, congresswoman
- Paul Stookey, singer-songwriter
- Tom Tracy, running back for the Pittsburgh Steelers

== See also ==
- International Academy
