= Anthony Pittman =

American football player (born 1996)

Profile
- Position: Linebacker

Personal information
- Born: November 24, 1996 (age 29); Detroit, Michigan, U.S.
- Listed height: 6 ft 3 in (1.91 m)
- Listed weight: 236 lb (107 kg)

Career information
- High school: Birmingham Groves (Beverly Hills, Michigan)
- College: Wayne State (2014–2018)
- NFL draft: 2019: undrafted

Career history
- Detroit Lions (2019–2023); Washington Commanders (2024)*; Jacksonville Jaguars (2024); Detroit Lions (2024–2025)
- * Offseason or practice squad member only

Awards and highlights
- 2× first-team All-GLIAC (2018, 2019)

Career NFL statistics as of 2025
- Tackles: 32
- Forced fumbles: 2
- Pass deflections: 1
- Stats at Pro Football Reference

Anthony J. Pittman (born November 24, 1996) is an American professional football linebacker. He played college football for the Wayne State Warriors and signed with the Lions as an undrafted free agent in 2019.

== Early life and college ==
Pittman’s life began on November 24, 1996, and attended Birmingham Groves High School. Lightly recruited he played college football at Wayne State. At Wayne State, Pittman was a two-year team captain and two-time first-team all-Great Lakes Intercollegiate Athletic Conference linebacker. During his college career, Pittman played in 43 games, recording 181 tackles and 8 sacks. Pittman also saw action on special teams for the Warriors.

== Professional career ==
Pre-draft measurables
Height	Weight	Arm length	Hand span	40-yard dash	10-yard split	20-yard split	20-yard shuttle	Three-cone drill	Vertical jump	Broad jump	Bench press
6 ft 2 1/2 in (1.89 m)	236 lb (107 kg)	32 3/8 in (0.82 m)	9 1/8 in (0.23 m)	4.70 s	1.67 s	2.69 s	4.38 s	7.28 s	36.0 in (0.91 m)	10 ft 6 in (3.20 m)	15 reps
All values from Pro Day

=== Detroit Lions (first stint) ===
Pittman went undrafted in the 2019 NFL draft. He then signed with the Detroit Lions. Pittman was waived on August 30, 2019, and signed to the practice squad the next day. He was released from the practice squad on November 5, but re-signed to the practice squad three days later. Pittman was released again from the practice squad on December 3. Pittman was signed again to the practice squad on December 8. Pittman was promoted to the active roster on December 26.

On September 5, 2020, Pittman was waived by the Lions and re-signed to the practice squad the next day. He was placed on the practice squad/COVID-19 list by the team on December 22, and restored to the practice squad on January 2, 2021. He signed a reserve/future contract with Detroit on January 5.

On August 30, 2022, Pittman was waived by the Lions and re-signed to the practice squad the next day. He was promoted to the active roster on September 27. Pittman played in all 17 regular season games in the 2022 and 2023 seasons for the Lions, as well as all three playoff games in the 2023 season, primarily on special teams.

=== Washington Commanders ===
On March 14, 2024, Pittman signed with the Washington Commanders. He was released by the Commanders on August 27.

=== Jacksonville Jaguars ===
On October 7, 2024, Pittman was signed to the Jacksonville Jaguars practice squad. He played in one game for Jacksonville, and recorded one tackle.

=== Detroit Lions (second stint) ===
On December 17, 2024, Pittman was signed by the Detroit Lions off of the Jaguars' practice squad.

On March 14, 2025, Pittman re-signed with the Lions on a one-year contract. He was released on August 26 as part of final roster cuts, and re-signed to the practice squad. Pittman was released on September 9.
