= Rachel Sussman (producer) =

Broadway theater producer

Rachel Sussman is an American theater producer known for her work on Broadway and Off-Broadway productions with social justice themes. She is the co-founder of the industry initiative Business of Broadway an organization that advocates for transparency and education in commercial theater producing.

== Early life and education ==
She is from Bloomfield Hills, Michigan and was involved in theater productions at Groves High School.

== Career ==
Broadway producing credits include: Suffs (Tony and OCC Award), Tony and Emmy Award winner Alex Edelman's Just for Us, Parade (Tony, Drama Desk, OCC Award), What the Constitution Means to Me (Tony nomination and Pulitzer Prize finalist), and Prima Facie. Off-Broadway: Lead Producer on the Obie Award-winning production of The Woodsman and Natalie Maroglin's All Nighter.

== Advocacy and community work ==
Sussman volunteers at JQY (Jewish Queer Youth), a nonprofit that advocates for LGBTQ+ Jewish youth from non-affirming communities, and was honored at JQY's Gala in 2025 with the inaugural Jewish Queer Icon Award.

She has produced and participated in events supporting organizations like Donor Direct Action, Covenant House International, the ACLU/NYCLU, March For Our Lives, and the CDC Foundation's Coronavirus Emergency Response Fund.

She is an Artist Ambassador for the New York Civil Liberties Union (NYCLU), and sits on the Board for WP Theater and Advisory Boards of Detroit Public Theatre and the Broadway Women's Fund.

== Awards and honors ==
In addition to winning a Tony Award, Rachel was a WP Theater Lab Time Warner Foundation Fellow and the recipient of the 2018-2019 Prince Fellowship in Creative Producing. She has been recognized by Variety as "10 to Watch on Broadway". She is a graduate of the Commercial Theater Institute, a former Columbia University Research Scholar, and a University Honors Scholar alumna of New York University's Tisch School of the Arts.
