= Oakland County Board of Commissioners =

Michigan county legislature

Type
- Type: Unicameral

Leadership
- Chairman: Dave Woodward since 2019

Structure
- Seats: 19
- Political groups: Majority: Democratic (10); Minority: Republican (7); Democratic (2)
- Length of term: 4 years

Elections
- Last election: 2024
- Next election: 2028

Meeting place
- Commissioners Auditorium; 1200 N. Telegraph Road, Pontiac, Michigan

Website
- oakgov.com

The Oakland County Board of Commissioners (OCBoC) is the legislative branch of the government of Oakland County, Michigan. It is composed of 19 commissioners, each elected to represent a single-member district in the county. Commissioners are elected to four-year terms in presidential election years; prior to the 2024 election, commissioners served two-year terms.

The county board sets policy and laws for the county regarding property, public health services, public safety, and maintenance of county highways. It is presided over by its chair, currently Dave Woodward. Meetings of the Board of Commissioners are held in the Commissioners' Auditorium at the Oakland County Service Center in Pontiac, and are open for public attendance and comment.

== Commissioners ==
This is a list of the Oakland County Commissioners in order by district, current as of 2024.

In July 2025, Democratic commissioners Kristen Nelson and Charlie Cavell announced their departure from the majority caucus, citing concerns with leadership, transparency, and public accountability.

District	Communities included	Commissioner	Party	Residence	Since
1	Birmingham, Royal Oak, Troy	Dave Woodward	Democratic	Royal Oak	2005
2	Clawson, Royal Oak, Troy	Penny Luebs	Democratic	Clawson	2019
3	Hazel Park, Madison Heights, Troy	Ann Erickson Gault	Democratic	Madison Heights	2023
4	Auburn Hills, Rochester Hills	Brendan Johnson	Democratic	Rochester Hills	2023
5	Addison Township, Oakland Township, Oxford, Oxford Township, Rochester, Rochester Hills	Michael Spisz	Republican	Oxford	2013
6	Lake Orion, Oakland Township, Orion Township, Rochester Hills	Michael Gingell	Republican	Lake Orion	2007
7	Brandon Township, Fenton, Highland Township, Holly, Holly Township, Ortonville, White Lake Township	Bob Hoffman	Republican	Highland Township	2011
8	Clarkston, Independence Township, Lake Angelus, Waterford	Karen Joliat	Republican	Waterford	2021
9	Bloomfield Township, Pontiac	Angela Powell	Democratic	Pontiac	2019
10	Keego Harbor, Pontiac, Sylvan Lake, Waterford, West Bloomfield	Kristen Nelson	Democratic (Note: Not part of the Democratic majority caucus)	Waterford	2019
11	Bloomfield Hills, Bloomfield Township, Orchard Lake Village, West Bloomfield	Marcia Gershenson	Democratic	Bloomfield Hills	2005
12	Commerce Township, Waterford, White Lake Township, Wolverine Lake	Christine Long	Republican	Commerce Township	2003
13	Highland Township, Lyon Township, Milford, Milford Township, South Lyon, White Lake Township	Phil Weipert	Republican	South Lyon	2011
14	Commerce Township, Novi, Walled Lake, Wixom	Robert Smiley	Republican	Wixom	2025
15	Farmington Hills, Novi	Gwen Markham	Democratic	Novi	2019
16	Farmington, Farmington Hills	William Miller	Democratic	Farmington Hills	2019
17	Lathrup Village, Oak Park, Southfield, Royal Oak Township	Yolanda Smith Charles	Democratic	Southfield	2021
18	Beverly Hills, Bingham Farms, Franklin, Southfield, Southfield Township	Linnie Taylor	Democratic	Southfield	2023
19	Berkley, Birmingham, Ferndale, Huntington Woods, Pleasant Ridge, Royal Oak	Charlie Cavell	Democratic	Ferndale	2021

== See also ==
- Dave Coulter
