= Southfield Township, Michigan =

- Civil township
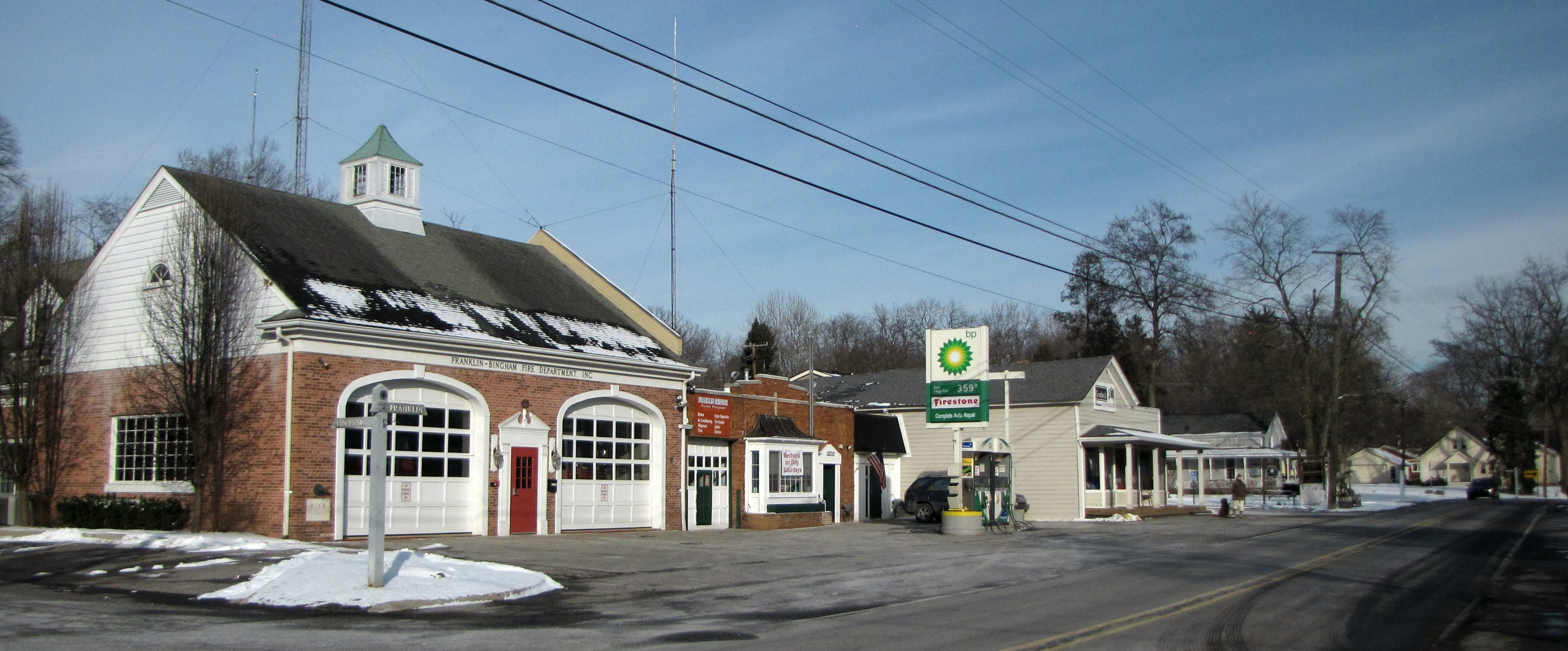
- Downtown Franklin in 2013

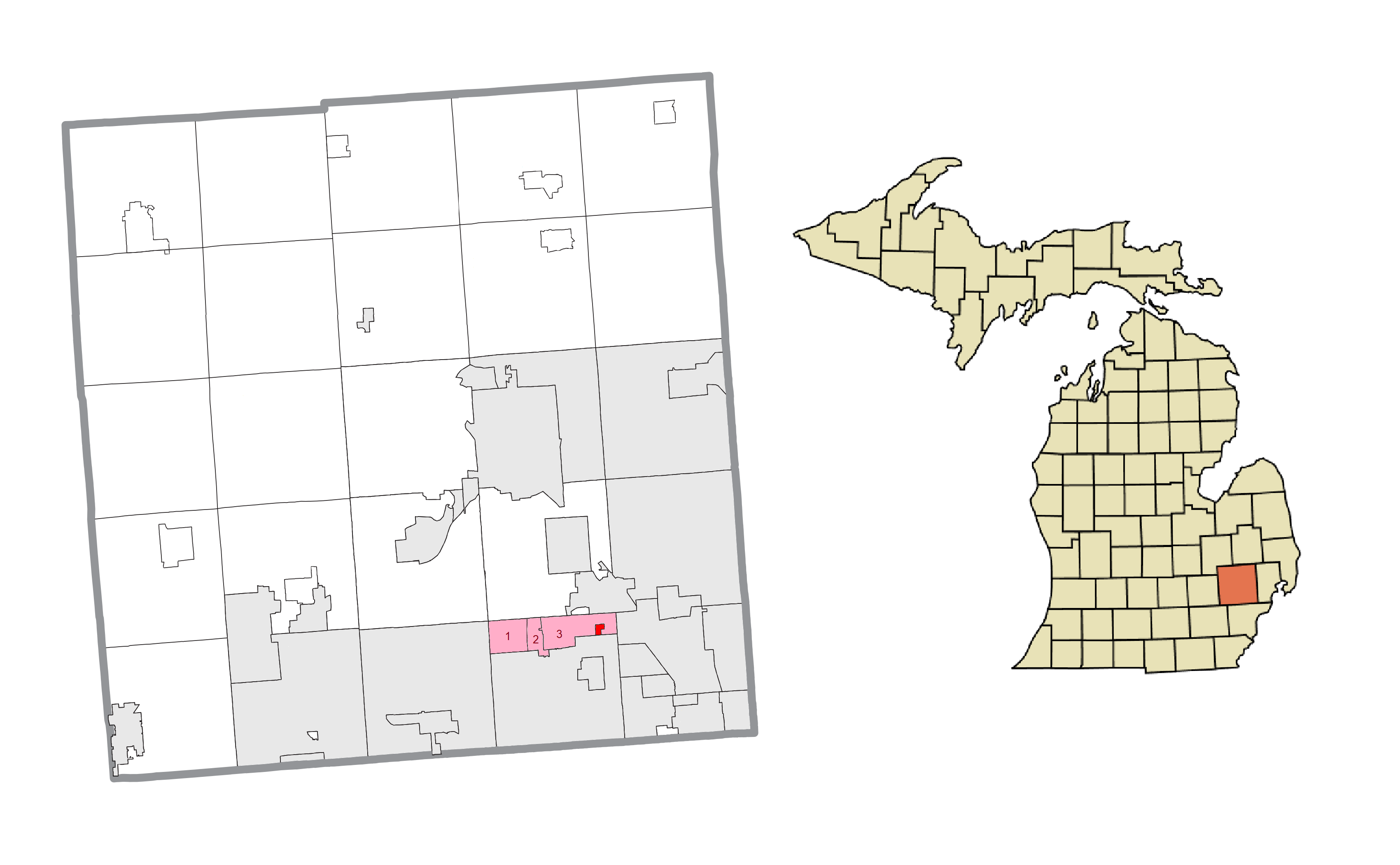
- Location within Oakland County showing the administered villages of Franklin (1), Bingham Farms (2), and Beverly Hills (3), with the remaining unincorporated area in red

- Location within the state of Michigan Southfield Township (the United States)
- Coordinates: 42°31′27″N 83°15′16″W
- Country: United States
- State: Michigan
- County: Oakland
- Organized: 1830

Government
  - Supervisor: James M. O’Reilly
  - Clerk: Eileen Harryvan

Area
  - Civil township: 8.06 sq mi (20.9 km^{2})
  - Land: 8.05 sq mi (20.8 km^{2})
  - Water: 0.01 sq mi (0.026 km^{2})
- Elevation: 690 ft (210 m)

Population (2020)
  - Civil township: 14,886
  - Density: 1,850/sq mi (714/km^{2})
  - Metro: 4,296,250 (Metro Detroit)
- Time zone: UTC-5 (Eastern (EST))
  - Summer (DST): UTC-4 (EDT)
- ZIP Code(s): 48025 (Franklin)
- Area code: 248
- FIPS code: 26-74920
- GNIS feature ID: 1627096
- Website: Official website

Southfield Township is a civil township in Oakland County in the U.S. state of Michigan. It contains the villages of Beverly Hills, Bingham Farms, and Franklin; though two small areas, comprising 0.17 square miles (0.44 km^{2}), remain unincorporated. As of the 2020 census, the township's population was 14,886, including the villages; the unincorporated areas' population was 31.

Organized in 1830, the township once occupied a much larger area, before the cities of Lathrup Village and Southfield incorporated into cities in the 1950s.

== History ==
Southfield Township, originally known as Ossewa Township, came into existence on July 12, 1830. The name was changed to Southfield Township seventeen days later. The village of Franklin was an early community established in the fall of 1828. Originally consisting of a survey township of 36 square miles (93 km^{2}), it has been reduced in size by the incorporation of municipalities. Only a handful of parcels remain outside the borders of the township's three villages.

The city of Lathrup Village was incorporated out of the east side of the township on May 12, 1953. The village of Franklin incorporated on November 8, 1953, the village of Bingham Farms on June 7, 1955, and the village of Beverly Hills (originally named the Village of Westwood) in April 1958. The city of Southfield was incorporated on April 28, 1958.

== Geography ==
According to the United States Census Bureau, the township has a total area of 8.06 square miles (20.88 km^{2}), of which 8.05 square miles (20.85 km^{2}) is land and 0.01 square miles (0.03 km^{2}) (0.12%) is water.

== Government ==
=== Federal, state, and county legislators ===
United States House of Representatives
District	Representative	Party	Since
12th	Rashida Tlaib	Democratic	2023

Michigan Senate
District	Senator	Party	Since
7th	Jeremy Moss	Democratic	2023
8th	Mallory McMorrow	Democratic	2023

Michigan House of Representatives
District	Representative	Party	Since
5th	Natalie Price	Democratic	2023
19th	Samantha Steckloff	Democratic	2023

Oakland County Board of Commissioners
District	Commissioner	Party	Since
18	Linnie Taylor	Democratic	2023

== Demographics ==
As of the census of 2000, there were 14,430 people, 5,612 households, and 4,214 families residing in the township. The population density was 1,794.9 inhabitants per square mile (693.0/km^{2}). There were 5,800 housing units at an average density of 721.4 per square mile (278.5/km^{2}). The racial makeup of the township was 92.39% White, 3.62% African American, 0.13% Native American, 2.17% Asian, 0.01% Pacific Islander, 0.29% from other races, and 1.38% from two or more races. Hispanic or Latino of any race were 1.23% of the population.

There were 5,612 households, out of which 32.9% had children under the age of 18 living with them, 67.4% were married couples living together, 5.5% had a female householder with no husband present, and 24.9% were non-families. 21.7% of all households were made up of individuals, and 10.1% had someone living alone who was 65 years of age or older. The average household size was 2.55 and the average family size was 2.99.

In the township the population was spread out, with 24.7% under the age of 18, 3.7% from 18 to 24, 25.3% from 25 to 44, 27.6% from 45 to 64, and 18.7% who were 65 years of age or older. The median age was 43 years. For every 100 females, there were 94.8 males. For every 100 females age 18 and over, there were 90.2 males.

The median income for a household in the township was $97,719, and the median income for a family was $109,249. Males had a median income of $83,609 versus $50,957 for females. The per capita income for the township was $51,328. About 1.3% of families and 1.9% of the population were below the poverty line, including 1.1% of those under age 18 and 1.7% of those age 65 or over.

== Education ==
The Birmingham City School District provides public school services to the township.
