= Global Commercial Credit =

Global Commercial Credit LLC
- Company logo
- Industry: Insurance broker
- Founded: March 1, 1996
- Founder: Craig Bonnell; Victor Sandy
- Headquarters: Bingham Farms, Michigan, U.S.
- Number of locations: Offices in Connecticut, Massachusetts, Maryland, Florida, Illinois, Ohio
- Products: Trade credit insurance; Political risk insurance
- Website: www.gccrisk.com

Global Commercial Credit LLC is an American trade credit and political risk insurance broker.

== History ==
Global Commercial Credit was founded on March 1, 1996 by Craig Bonnell and Victor Sandy in Bingham Farms, Michigan. The company targeted middle-market companies with revenues of between $50 million and $500 million, an area which David Brophy, a finance professor at the University of Michigan, said was underrepresented due to a trend towards larger banks.

The company opened a second office, in Chicago, Illinois, in the fall of 1996 and reported that they had protected over $2 billion in receivables, representing five different insurers, after 10 months of business. The company operates offices in Boston, Baltimore, Tampa, Chicago, and Cleveland.
