= Rachael Fried =

Jewish LGBTQ+ Leadership

- Born: 1987 (age 38–39); United States
- Education: Yeshiva University
- Occupation: Nonprofit executive
- Employer: JQY
- Known for: Queer Jewish advocacy

Rachael Fried is an American LGBTQ+ advocate, artist, and nonprofit leader, recognized for her work within the Jewish queer community. She currently serves as the executive director of JQY (Jewish Queer Youth), a nonprofit organization dedicated to supporting and empowering LGBTQ youth from Orthodox, Chasidic, and Sephardic/Mizrahi backgrounds.

== Early life and education ==
Fried was raised in Fairfield, Connecticut, in a traditional Orthodox Jewish home. She attended Yeshiva University, where she earned a Bachelor of Arts in Studio Art from Stern College for Women. During her time at Stern College, she served as the president of the student body and was recognized as a Presidential Fellow. Fried furthered her education by obtaining a Master of Social Work (MSW) in Community Organizing from the Wurzweiler School of Social Work at Yeshiva University and a Master of Fine Arts (MFA) in Transdisciplinary Design from Parsons School of Design. Her MFA thesis, "Critical Creature Cards," focused on designing media to facilitate discussions about race and racism between white parents and their children.

== Advocacy and impact ==
Fried is widely recognized for her advocacy work at the intersection of faith and queer identity. She has been a vocal leader in promoting the rights and inclusion of LGBTQ individuals within the Jewish community. Fried has spoken at numerous prestigious conferences and events, including at Harvard Law School, Columbia, Barnard, and NYU.

Fried has written about the high levels of suicidality among LGBTQ teens from Orthodox backgrounds and has advocated for tailored support programs that address the specific needs of these individuals.

In addition to her nonprofit work, Fried is an artist known for her "MonsterHearts" series, which seeks to destigmatize marginalized communities through visual storytelling. Her creative projects often intersect with her advocacy work, using art as a means to challenge biases and promote inclusivity.

== Awards and recognition ==
Fried has been recognized with several awards for her contributions to both the Jewish and LGBTQ communities. She is a Wexner Field Fellow, a Schusterman ROI Community member, and a Ruskay Institute alum. In 2022, she was honored with the JPro Young Professional Award, which recognizes outstanding professionals in the Jewish nonprofit sector. Fried has been recognized by the Jewish Week as a 36 Under 36 and is also on the "36 To Watch" list.
