= Jordan Gruber =

American soccer player

Jordan Gruber ירדן גרובר
Personal information
- Date of birth: September 12, 1983 (age 43)
- Place of birth: Beverly Hills, Michigan, United States
- Height: 5 ft 10 in (1.78 m)
- Position: Striker

Youth career
- 2001–2007: Michigan State University

Senior career*
Years	Team	Apps	(Gls)
2003	Michigan Bucks	10	(0)
2005	OFK Beograd	0	(0)
2007–2008	Maccabi HaShikma Ramat Hen	23	(2)
2008–2010	Hapoel Marmorek	20	(1)
- * Club domestic league appearances and goals as of 21:11, 11 April 2009 (UTC)

Jordan Gruber
Medal record

Representing United States

Soccer

Maccabiah Games
Silver medal – second place	2005 Maccabiah	Soccer

Jordan Gruber (Hebrew: ירדן גרובר; born September 12, 1983) is an American former professional soccer player.

== Biography ==
He is the son of Avi, originally from Israel, and the owner of Avi's Auto Care, and Abby Gruber, and was born in Beverly Hills, Michigan. He attended Birmingham Groves High School, for whom he played soccer. He set the Michigan State High School goal-scoring record with 69 goals as a senior, in addition to 21 assists. He was named Oakland Press Player of the Year, and was named all-district, all-region, all-state, all-metro, and all-county. He also lettered in tennis as a senior.

He played college soccer at forward for the Michigan State University for the Michigan State Spartans. In September 2004 he was named the Big Ten Offensive Player of the Week in men's soccer.

In June 2005, he signed a six-month contract with OFK Beograd straight out of university. He made aliyah in 2007 via the Law of Return, and played for Israel's Maccabi HaShikma Ramat Hen and Hapoel Marmorek.

He played for the United States team at the 2005 Maccabiah Games in Israel, winning a silver medal.

== Statistics ==
Club performance			League		Cup		League Cup		Continental		Total	
Season	Club	League	Apps	Goals	Apps	Goals	Apps	Goals	Apps	Goals	Apps	Goals
USA			League		Open Cup		League Cup		North America		Total	
2003	Michigan Bucks	PDL	10	0							10	0
Total	USA											
Serbia			League		Serbian Cup		League Cup		Europe		Total	
2005-06	OFK Beograd	Superliga	0	0								
Total	Serbia			0	0							
Israel			League		Israel State Cup		Toto Cup		Europe		Total	
2007-08	Maccabi HaShikma Ramat Hen	Liga Artzit	23	2			4	1			27	3
2008-09	Hakoah Maccabi Amidar/Ramat Gan	Liga Artzit	20	1	1	0	6	2	0	0	27	3
Total	Israel											
Career total												
