= Charlie Burg =

American singer-songwriter and producer

- Born: September 19, 1996 (age 29); Detroit, Michigan, U.S.
- Genres: Indie rock, Alternative R&B
- Years active: 2015–present
- Label: Fader

Charlie Burg (born September 19, 1996) is an American singer-songwriter and producer. In 2015, Burg released a mixtape, Blue Wave Mosaic, then went on to release a series of extended plays from 2016 to 2019. In 2022, Burg released his debut album Infinitely Tall.

== Early life and education ==
Burg was born in Detroit, Michigan. He was brought up in a Jewish household, frequently wears a Magen David pendant, and has cited singing in Synagogue as an early exposure to music. He attended Seaholm High School, then Denison University for his freshman year of college, before transferring to Michigan State University's Residential College in Arts and Humanities, where he studied humanities and English. After his sophomore year, he transferred again to the Setnor School of Music at Syracuse University to major in music industry.

== Artistry ==
Burg describes his music as R&B/indie rock. He cites early influences to his music as Al Green, Marvin Gaye, and The Temptations. Burg was inspired by Ralph Waldo Emerson's poems in his newest extended plays.

== Discography ==
=== Albums ===
- Infinitely Tall (2022)
- Back to Earth (2025)

=== Mixtapes ===
- Blue Wave Mosaic (2015)

=== EPs ===
- Live in Peter’s Attic (2016)
- One, Violet (2017)
- Two, Moonlight (2018)
- Three, Fever (2019)
- Thank you for the love (2024)

=== Singles ===
- "Tha Breeze, Tha Steeze, Palm Trees"
- "Channel Orange In Your Living Room"
- "Lancaster Nights"
- "Title Guide to the Talkies"
- "97 Avalon"
- "Break The Rhythm"
- "Chicago (Take It Or Leave It)"
- "Ooh! Sumthin' New"
- "Before We Step Inside"
- "On and On"
- "Upon Arrival"
- ‘'Reach’’
