= Michael Simon (ceramic artist) =

American ceramist (1947–2021)

Michael John Simon (1947 – 29 August 2021) was an American ceramic artist. He is known primarily for his salt-fired stoneware works combining distinct forms with wax-resist animal or natural motifs.

== Early life and education ==
Simon was born in Springfield, Minnesota in 1947. He studied under Warren MacKenzie while pursuing his B.F.A. at the University of Minnesota, and would later credit not only MacKenzie's influence in his work, but also the influence of MacKenzie's mentors, the noted ceramic artists Bernard Leach (UK) and Shoji Hamada (Japan).

In 1970, he moved to the pottery community of Happy Valley, Georgia. He would go on to receive his M.F.A. in ceramics from the University of Georgia in 1981.

== Career ==
In 1980, Simon built his own salt kiln after seeing the work of ceramic artist Mark Pharis. That same year, he began to keep a pot from each of his kiln loads in order to have an ongoing record of his work's development. These pots formed the basis of the book "Evolution", released through the University of North Carolina Press. Simon's former teacher, Warren MacKenzie, wrote the foreword to the book.

In the 1980s, Simon held pottery sales with his professor, the noted Athens ceramic artist Ron Meyers. The sales were held on the first weekend of June and December at Meyers' studio, and became known for their frenzied atmosphere.

On September 27-28, 2005, Simon was interviewed by ceramic artist Mark Shapiro for the Smithsonian Archives of American Art. That same year, he ended his pottery work for health reasons. He was interviewed again for the archives on February 23, 2018; this time, the interview was conducted by ceramics dealer Leslie Ferrin, and Lyndel King, the director of the Weisman Art Museum at the University of Minnesota.

In 2011, the Northern Clay Center hosted a 30-year retrospective of his work, and two years later, the Georgia Museum of Art hosted 'Pick of the Kiln', an exhibition of his work across decades.

He died on August 29, 2021.

== Collections ==
Simon had works in numerous museums and collections, including the Everson Museum of Art, the Smithsonian Museum of American Art, the Minneapolis Institute of Arts, and the Georgia Museum of Art.
