= Michael B Simon =

American entrepreneur

Michael B. Simon
- Other name: Michael Simon
- Education: University of Michigan
- Occupation: Entrepreneur
- Known for: Analytics director, Obama for America; CEO, Elucd
- Website: michaelbsimon.com

Michael B. Simon is an American entrepreneur and analytics expert who notably led analytics efforts on Barack Obama's 2008 presidential election campaign. He is the co-founder of the technology startup Elucd.

== Early life ==
Simon reportedly got his first computer at the age of four and, as a fifteen-year-old high school freshman in 1996, had started an internet business with four friends. He attended Seaholm High School in Birmingham, Michigan, and earned BA and JD degrees from the University of Michigan.

== Career ==
=== Political campaigns ===
After working as a field organizer for the Michigan Democratic Party in the 2000 presidential election, and then on John Kerry’s campaign for president in 2004, Simon joined Barack Obama's 2008 presidential campaign as the analytics director, based in the Chicago headquarters. As a part of this campaign, he managed stockpiles of data on voter behavior and preferences. His strategy of precision targeting has been credited with helping to identify undecided voters who could be courted by Obama. Following the campaign, he was appointed in 2009 to the Obama administration at the Department of Health and Human Services, where he focused on healthcare reform and Medicare.

Simon has been a guest speaker at Harvard's Kennedy School of Government and the World Economic Forum of Young Global Leaders.

=== HaystaqDNA ===
In 2013, Simon co-founded HaystaqDNA, where he worked with commercial and advocacy clients to utilize technology to identify targeted individuals using predictive analytics. This also involves matching public posts from social media on political issues such as health care to refine targeting of voters. As co-founder and president of HaystaqDNA, Simon was active in gaining data and interviewing US voters on subjects like gun safety and energy use. In December 2015, he joined CBS Radio as a senior advisor, to enhance their overall data analytics capabilities.

=== Elucd ===
Simon co-founded technology startup Elucd (pronounced e-loo-cid, as in "elucidate"), which launched in 2016 and is based in Brooklyn, New York. He is CEO of the data analytics firm, which provides cities with an understanding of how citizens feel about their local government. By early 2018, the company had raised $1 million in a seed round backed by the Y Combinator accelerator, and the Omidyar Network.

The New York Police Department first approached Simon in 2014 to see if it were possible to measure public approval of local police. In 2016, Elucd began developing the underlying technology that became Elucd in collaboration with the NYPD. Elucd uses surveys obtained through digital advertisements to measure public perception of safety and police, providing real-time statistics. It was introduced by the NYPD in 2017. Elucd has also worked with the Chicago Police Department, Grand Rapids Police Department, and South Bend Police Department.

== Works ==
- Serge Grossman and Michael Simon. "And Congress Shall Know the Truth: The Pressing Need for Restructuring Congressional Oversight of Intelligence". Harvard Law & Policy Review, pp. 435–447. 2008.
