= JQY =

Nonprofit organization based in New York

- Jewish Queer Youth
- Abbreviation: JQY, JQY INC., Jewish Queer Youth
- Formation: 2001
- Founder: Mordechai Levovitz
- Type: 501(c)(3) nonprofit organization
- Tax ID no.: 27-5305498
- Legal status: 501c3 Nonprofit
- Services: Drop-in center, crisis line, group therapy, individual therapy, community events, trainings for mental health professionals, rabbis, and community leaders
- Executive director: Rachael Fried
- Budget: US$513,000 (2021)
- Website: jqy.org

JQY (or Jewish Queer Youth) is a mental health organization that empowers Jewish queer teens and young adults to live healthy, joyful lives. JQY provides critical services and programs for at-risk youth from historically non-accepting communities, often focusing on those from Orthodox, Chassidic, and Sephardic/Mizrahi homes. The organization began in 2001 as an online listserv and started meeting in the Manhattan Jewish Community Center in 2003. Rachael Fried became executive director in June 2019.

== Programs ==
The organization firmly believes in meeting each individual person where they are. JQY creates spaces for individuals who share the common identities of being LGBTQ and Jewish. Their members have many different views on LGBTQ issues and religion, and all are welcome to share their perspectives and experiences with the group and staff. JQY does not promote a way of life or belief system. The group supports members' self-determination, and provides them with support while they explore their own identities, own beliefs, and make life decisions.

JQY's flagship program is the Drop-in Center for LGBTQ youth which is open to anyone who is 13 to 23 years of age. These sessions are a space for queer young adults to meet others they can relate to, participate in workshops, and become a part of an affirming community. When a member comes to a drop-in session for the first time, they have a private meeting with a clinician, where they discuss matters relating to self-harm and food/housing access.

JQY's warmline can be reached via call or text at 551-JQY-HOPE (551-579-4673). Contact this number to speak with one of JQY's licensed mental health professionals.

Recent research suggests that JQY successfully helps their members build an essential peer network and negotiate tensions between religion and sexual orientation.

== Collaborations ==
The organization contributed a video to the It Gets Better Project.

JQY marched with Eshel and other Jewish LGBTQ organizations in the Celebrate Israel Parade of 2012, the first year openly LGBT groups were permitted to participate. Participation in pride parades has been a contentious issue in the Orthodox LGBTQ community.

In 2017 top Jewish musicians, such as Matisyahu, Neshama Carlebach and Eli Schwebel performed in support of JQY.
