= Michael Anthony Simon =

American artist

Michael Anthony Simon (born 1978 in Mesa, Arizona) is an American artist known for his sculpture work with spiders and spiderwebs. In 2009 he moved from Chicago to Korea. While living in the countryside there he took an interest in the relationship between nature, artists and the materials they use. He began by painting leaves in the forest and photographing the result. Simon then began catching spiders, until he settled on the work of the golden silk orb-weaver, allowing them to weave webs between acrylic rods set vertically into triangular pedestals. Overnight the spiders created webs which Simon spray painted. Before he began working with nature he focused his art on angles, texture and lighting to show the viewers how their relative position and time influences perception. In 2016 Simon was diagnosed with Leber's hereditary optic neuropathy, a condition caused by a rare gene mutation, which causes blindness. As a result, he left Korea and moved to Denver, Colorado and continued his work with spiders. He has since worked without color, painting polar bears in blizzards. In 2017 he had a gallery exhibit at Apex Art in SoHo.
