= Ron Meyers (potter) =

American studio potter and ceramics teacher

Ronald Meyers
- Born: 1934 (age 91–92); Buffalo, NY

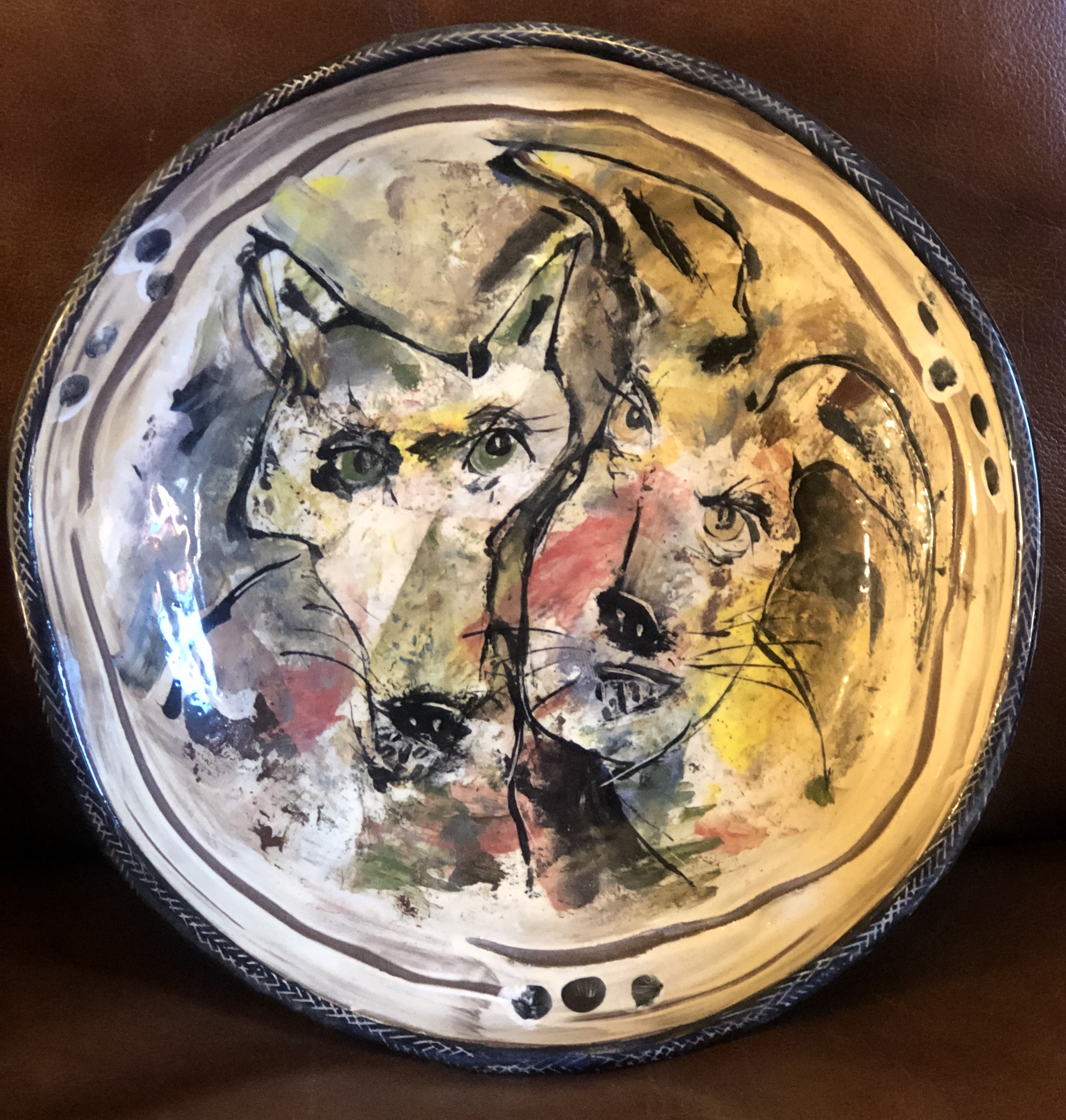
Ron Meyers Fox and Hare Bowl. Earthernware with colored slips and artist fingermarks. Private collection. Date unknown. 12.5" x 12.5" x 2.75"

Ron Meyers (born 1934) is an American studio potter and ceramics teacher known for producing functional pottery featuring animal and human forms. His work is featured in numerous museums and notable collections, including the Smithsonian American Art Museum, the Georgia Museum of Art, and the Rosenfield Collection, and he has presented more than 100 workshops in the US and internationally. He has been described as "one of his generation's most important potters" and "an icon of the American ceramics community."

== Biography ==
=== Early life and education ===
Meyers was born in Buffalo, NY, in 1934. His family cottage along Lake Erie in Irving, NY, would later become the site of his summer studio, and he credits his comfort there to his childhood connection. "All the family ghosts are there. It's a blue collar area. I just feel real comfortable there. It's just a nice place to be - I remember my past there and I want to stay connected with it."

Meyers' parents encouraged him to pursue the arts after seeing a poster he drew in middle school. As noted in a 2016 exhibition at Auburn University, "When continuing on to high school he enrolled in the art program and discovered a love for comic books. It was not so much their stories, but rather the stark black-and-white drawings of femmes fatales in comics like Terry and the Pirates and Steven Canyon that captured his attention."

Meyers earned his Bachelor of Science (1956) and Master's degree (1961) in Art Education from the State University College at Buffalo, followed by his MFA in Ceramics (1967) from the School for American Craftsmen at the Rochester Institute of Technology where he studied under noted potter Frans Wildenhain. Wildenhain and Hobart Cowles served as advisors for his MFA thesis, "Ceramic hibachis and serving dishes".

=== Teaching career ===
Before teaching ceramics at Rochester Institute of Technology, he taught art at Gowanda Central School District in Gowanda New York. He taught ceramics at the University of South Carolina from 1967-1972, and then at the University of Georgia from 1972 until his retirement in 1992. He remains an emeritus faculty member of the Lamar Dodd School of Art at the University of Georgia. In 2019, the Lamar Dodd school launched a student support fund to raise the necessary capital to endow the Ron Meyers Graduate Award in Ceramics, which will be awarded annually in honor of Meyers' legacy.

=== Post-Retirement ===
In 1995, the Museum of Arts and Sciences in Macon, Georgia, hosted a retrospective show titled "Ron Meyers: Thirty Years", featuring 75 works. In 2008, the Northern Clay Center in Minneapolis, Minnesota, inducted him as a Regis Master, which seeks to honor "senior artists who have had a major impact on the development of 20th and 21st century ceramics." Past recipients include Don Reitz, Val Cushing, Nino Caruso, Gutte Eriksen, and Paul Soldner, and Meyers later said he was "awestruck" at the honor as he was a C student most of his life. That same year, he was awarded the Excellence in Teaching Award by the National Council on Education for the Ceramic Arts.

In 2013, the Arkansas Arts Center hosted "Ron Meyers: A Potter's Menagerie", billed as "the first comprehensive exhibition of the artist's work", featuring "more than one hundred ceramics in a variety of forms." Also in 2013, fellow potter and former student George McCauley released a film about Ron's work titled "Ron Meyers and the Usual Suspects," which screened at numerous locations including the Mobile Museum of Art. The 'usual suspects' in the film's title refer to the animals that recur frequently in Meyers', including pigs, rabbits, rats, fish, cats, etc.

== Work ==
Meyers is known for his functional pottery, including plates, cups, bowls, vases, teapots, and other usable forms. His primary work is wheel-thrown, though he also has a body of sculptural work including candlesticks and masks, as well as drawings. His earlier works were primarily in stoneware before switching to low-fire earthenware in the late 1970s-1980s. In the mid-1990s, Meyers expanded his work to include low-fired, salt-glazed pieces, about which he said, "I needed a vehicle to reduce the color and instill a pure sense of form."

He is noted for the "spontaneous and gestural" but "casual and relaxing manner" of his work and the colored slip paintings they incorporated. The slip paintings on his vessels can be seen as "funny, pointed, provocative and/or confrontational." Notably, the vast majority of his work is unsigned.

His main studio is outside his home in Athens, Georgia, and includes an anagama kiln. He built his summer studio behind his family cottage in Irving, NY.

=== Influences ===
Meyers' cited influences begin with his childhood interest in cartoons, and his later interest in Japanese Shino ware and English slipware of the 16th through 18th centuries. He noted a memorable encounter with a 16th century Japanese Shino water ewer at the Royal Ontario Museum of Arts, saying "it had a crooked spout, finger marks, a drippy, grazing glaze, a handle slightly askew...It seemed to revel in its blemishes and technical faults. It was the spirit or approach...that I was after." Likewise, he noted that English slipware had a "playfulness and sense of humor...these pieces had a naive quality, lack of pretense, no-guilt approach...it was this attitude...that I wished to adopt." Others have noted influences including Pablo Picasso, Marc Chagall, Bernard Leach, and Shoji Hamada.

=== Relationships ===
Meyers studied under Frans Wildenhain at the Rochester Institute of Technology. He later said, "What I was to really learn from Frans was the type of commitment and passion that it took to be an artist. Frans' whole life revolved around his work, and it was inspiring to see how his work and environment reflected his awareness and concern for nature and life itself." Meyers noted that Wildenhain expressed "subtle disapproval" for his choice to base a thesis on ceramic hibachis and serving dishes, noting "To say that Frans was delighted by my choice would definitely be a gross exaggeration."

Meyers is also a long-time friend of noted potter Chuck Hindes, and the two have presented numerous workshops and been featured in gallery shows together.

=== Collections ===
Meyers' work is found in numerous museums and notable collections, including:

- Georgia Museum of Art
- John W. Bardo Fine and Performing Arts Center at Western Carolina University
- Rosenfield Collection
- Smithsonian American Art Museum
