= Birmingham Public Schools =

School district in Michigan, United States

Address
- 31301 Evergreen Road Beverly Hills, Oakland, Michigan, 48025; United States
- Coordinates: 42°31′04.4″N 83°14′40.0″W

District information
- Type: Public school district
- Motto: Be bold. Be brilliant. Be Birmingham.
- Grades: Prekindergarten-12
- Superintendent: Dr. Embekka Roberson
- Schools: 13
- Budget: $211,539,000 2022-2023 expenditures
- NCES District ID: 2605850

Students and staff
- Students: 7,424 (2024-2025)
- Teachers: 496.76 (on an FTE basis) (2024-2025)
- Staff: 1,246.81 FTE (2024-2025)
- Student–teacher ratio: 14.94 (2024-2025)

Other information
- Website: www.birmingham.k12.mi.us

Birmingham Public Schools is a public school district in Metro Detroit in the U.S. state of Michigan, serving Birmingham, Bingham Farms, Beverly Hills, Franklin, and portions of Bloomfield Hills, Bloomfield Township, Southfield, Troy, and West Bloomfield. (Note: The district also includes a small portion of Royal Oak which is completely industrialized and has no residential areas.). The district is free to students who live within the district, and tuition-based programs are available to students outside of the district.

== History ==
In 1834, the first "district" school in Birmingham opened. This school was housed in John Hamilton's old log house at Hamilton Road and Old Woodward Ave. Rev. Lemuel M. Partridge served as the teacher. In 1856, the brick "Old Red Schoolhouse" was built at Maple and Southfield roads and served as a school until 1869. The Allen House, part of the Birmingham Historical Museum, now stands where the school was. A new school was built in 1869 and became the site of Birmingham's first high school.

In 1912, Barnum School was the next school to be built, and housed elementary grades up to sixth. It later became a junior high school and was torn down in 2008. Baldwin High School was built in 1917. In 1951, a new Birmingham High School was built, and in 1959, it was renamed Seaholm High School when Wylie E. Groves High School was built.

=== Barnum School ===
Birmingham's Barnum Park was formerly home to Barnum School. The first section of Barnum School was built in 1912, and featured Pewabic and Flint Faience tiles. It closed as a school in 1976 and became a center for adult education before being sold to Beaumont Hospital as a rehabilitation and outpatient facility. The city bought the building in 2002, and the school was torn down in 2008 for park space. Some elements of the building, such as the stone entrance, were preserved as features of the new park.

=== Baldwin High School ===
When local educator and benefactor Martha Baldwin died in 1913, she left the village money to build a high school. The building had to meet Baldwin's criteria: public baths for community use, and a 900-seat auditorium. By 1916, Baldwin High School was under construction at the southwest corner of Chester and Maple Streets, and it opened in 1918. It was designed by architecture firm Van Leyen, Schilling and Keough. With the opening of the current Seaholm High School in 1952, Baldwin School became an elementary school. It closed in 1972 and was torn down in 1974. The time capsule in its cornerstone was to be given to the city's historical board.

== Schools ==
Secondary Schools
School	Address	Notes
Birmingham Covington School	1525 Covington Road Bloomfield Hills	Serves grades 3-8. Lottery-based enrollment open to students living within the district. Built 1967.
Berkshire Middle School	21707 W. 14 Mile Road, Beverly Hills	Built 1963.
Derby Middle School	1300 Derby Road, Birmingham	Built 1958.
Groves High School	20500 W. 13 Mile Rd., Beverly Hills	Built 1959
Seaholm High School	2436 W. Lincoln, Birmingham	Built 1951
Lincoln Street Alternative High School	2436 W. Lincoln, Birmingham	Alternative high school, within Seaholm High School

Elementary Schools
School	Address	Notes
Early Childhood Center	2121 Midvale, Birmingham	Built 1957
Beverly Elementary	18305 Beverly, Beverly Hills	Built 1955
Bingham Farms Elementary	23400 13 Mile Road, Bingham Farms	Built 1968
Greenfield Elementary	31200 Fairfax Ave., Beverly Hills	New building opened 2006, replacing original 1957 building
Harlan Elementary	3595 North Adams Road, Bloomfield Hills	New building opened 2007, replacing original 1957 building
Pembroke Elementary	955 North Eton Road, Troy	Built 1955
Pierce Elementary	1829 Pierce, Birmingham	Built 1924
Quarton Elementary	771 Chesterfield, Birmingham	Built 1927
West Maple Elementary	6275 Inkster Road, Bloomfield Hills	Built 1968
