= French School of Detroit =

French school in Michigan

- French: École Française de Detroit

Information
- Grades: Preschool - Grade 12
- Website: https://www.frenchschoolofdetroit.org/

The French School of Detroit (FSD; French: École Française de Detroit) is a French school with its administrative offices in West Maple Middle School, in Bloomfield Township, Oakland County, Michigan in Metro Detroit; this facility has a Bloomfield Hills, Michigan mailing address.

The French School of Detroit serves preschool through high school. FSD students reside in the Birmingham Public School District.

== Locations ==
Elementary school students (kindergarten through fifth grade) attend classes at the following locations:

- Pierce Elementary School - 1829 Pierce Street, Birmingham, MI 48009
- West Maple Elementary School - 6275 Inkster Road, Bloomfield Hills, MI 48301

Secondary school students (sixth through twelfth grade) attend classes at the following locations:

- Berkshire Middle School - 21707 W 14 Mile Rd, Beverly Hills, MI 48025
- Groves High School - 20500 W 13 Mile Road, Beverly Hills, MI 48025

== History ==
The French School of Detroit was created in September 1986, pursuing the trend of French language education in Metro Detroit started by the "Lycée International School". The Lycée International School, opened in Southfield in 1981 after Renault moved 50 employees to Metro Detroit, because Renault purchased a stake in American Motors Company. In 1983 the Lycée International School had 130 students, with the majority being Americans, 30 being children of Renault employees, and 25 being children of French parents including diplomats. The School offers a bilingual education based on the French curriculum to enhance linguistic and cultural diversity and prepare students for higher education in the US, France and other countries.

== See also ==
- American School of Paris - An American international school in France
