= Wylie E. Groves High School =

Public school in Michigan, United States

Location
- 20500 West Thirteen Mile Road; Beverly Hills, Michigan 48025; United States; 42.5177°N 83.2449°W

Information
- School type: Public, high school
- Motto: A Tradition of Excellence
- Established: 1959
- Founder: Wylie E. Groves
- School district: Birmingham Public School District
- Superintendent: Embekka Roberson
- Principal: Othamian Peterson
- Teaching staff: 67.26 (on an FTE basis)
- Grades: 9–12
- Enrollment: 1,130 (as of 2023–2024)
- Student to teacher ratio: 16.80
- Campus size: 7 acres (2.8 ha)
- Campus type: Suburban
- Colors: Green, white, and gold
- Fight song: "Rise Up, All Falcons"
- Athletics conference: OAA White Division
- Nickname: Falcons
- Newspaper: The Scriptor
- Information: The FANN aka the falcon action news network is the schools news broadcast it is shown on Wednesday during advisory and Friday during 6th
- Website: groves.birmingham.k12.mi.us
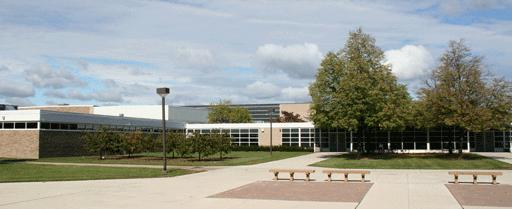

Wylie E. Groves High School is a public high school in Beverly Hills, Michigan, United States, in the Birmingham Public School District. Groves' colors are green, white, and yellow and its mascot is Freddy the Falcon. The current principal is Othamian Peterson.

The French School of Detroit holds its high school classes at Groves High School.

== History ==
=== Name ===
In 1951, a new high school in Birmingham opened under the name Birmingham High School (which is now known as Seaholm High School). At the time, the president of the Board of Education was Ernest W. Seaholm and the treasurer was Wylie E. Groves. When Birmingham had to build another school to accommodate the incoming baby boomers, these men's names became the source of the modern names of Birmingham's two main high schools: Seaholm High School and Groves High School.

=== Building history ===
Completed in 1959, the building was an example of the International Style applied to school design, resulting in a modernistic exterior look. The building's original architectural "signature" was a scalloped circular white roof over the circular library; now painted black, it is visible but no longer prominent.

=== Early years ===
The school opened in the fall of 1959 with 1,052 students in grades seven through ten. Intended eventually to be Birmingham's second high school, it was named after a local civic leader and school board member. The original tenth graders became the first class of graduating seniors in 1962. For a brief period the school was a junior and senior high school, and the classes of 1965, 1966 and 1967 spent grades seven through twelve there. Beginning with the 1963–64 school year, grades seven and eight were moved from Groves to Berkshire Middle School, which today serves grades six through eight in the Birmingham City School District. The lower grades were eliminated as new junior high schools were built. This pattern enabled the school district to accommodate, with phased construction, the demographic wave of babyboomers emerging from elementary schools in the late 1950s and 1960s.

== Academics ==
Student assessments
- 2021–22 school year Change vs. prior year

M-STEP 11th grade proficiency rates (Science / Social Studies)
- Advanced %: 23.0 / 11.5
- Proficient %: 33.3 / 26.8
- PR. Proficient %: 14.9 / 47.1
- Not Proficient %: 28.7 / 14.6

Average test scores
- SAT Total: 1067.9 (▼ −83.3)

The school offers numerous Honors and Advanced Placement courses for students to elect. Advanced Placement is offered for Biology, Chemistry, Physics, Calculus AB, Calculus BC, Computer Science, Economics, English Language, English Literature, Environmental Science, European History, French, Music Theory, Psychology, Spanish, Statistics, US History, and US Government. The school has a variety of academic elective options for students who do not wish to take Honors or AP courses. The school also offers many courses in journalism, with the newspaper, The Scriptor; the yearbook, The Talon, and the television production, The Fann (Falcon Action News Network).

== Athletics and activities ==
The school offers over 30 varsity sports for both men and women. Most sports are broken down into varsity, junior varsity, and freshmen teams. Groves is a member of the Oakland Activities Association and has won league championships in nearly every sport since the league's inception in 1994.

In soccer, Jordan Gruber set the Michigan State High School goal-scoring record with 69 goals as a senior.

Groves also offers a variety of activities for students to participate in, including instrumental music (both band and orchestra), forensics team, eco club, interact club, Robotics, fashion club, Amnesty and Animal Rights club, Gay-Straight Alliance club, Japanese club, Spanish club, French club, debate team, theatre, quiz bowl, bowling club, photography club, and the National Honor Society. Both the forensics and debate teams have enjoyed success in recent years. The forensics team finished second in the state in 2007, while the debate team finished first in 2006, 2007, 2008, 2009 and 2010.

Groves Student Congress (GSC) is responsible for planning school-wide activities and events such as Spirit Week, Field Day, Extreme Dodgeball, Operation Volleyball, Sadie Hawkins Dance, Wylie's Winter Week, and two blood drives. Members of GSC are elected in school-wide elections. In addition, each class elects its own government, which is responsible for planning class-wide events. Groves students also run their own events independent of the school, including the seniors-only "Water Wars" tournament at the end of the year.

=== State championships ===
State Championships
Season	Sport	Number of Championships	Year
Fall	Water Polo, Boys (MWPA)	6	1975, 1983, 1991, 1992, 1993, 1994
Fall	Soccer, Boys	1	1975
Fall	Tennis, Boys	1	2021
Fall	Swimming and Diving, Girls	5	1988, 2003, 2004, 2005, 2006
Winter	Swimming and Diving, Boys	8	1969, 1975, 2004, 2005, 2006, 2010, 2023, 2024
Spring	Golf, Boys	1	1971
Spring	Lacrosse, Birmingham Unified* Girls	5	2002, 2007, 2008, 2009, 2012
Spring	Figure Skating, Birmingham Unified* Girls	1	2003
Spring	Soccer, Girls	1	1998
Spring	Policy Debate Team, Co-ed (MIFA)	4	2006, 2007, 2008, 2010
Total		29	

* Birmingham Unified is a combined team of Groves and Seaholm students

== Notable alumni ==
- Pat Caputo, 1959, sportswriter and broadcaster
- Leigh Taylor-Young, 1962, actress
- Jeff Teague, 1975, automotive designer
- C. Mark Jordan, 1975, automotive designer
- Bruce Campbell, 1976, movie actor
- Jim Chanos, 197x, investment manager
- Sam Raimi, 1976, movie director
- Rich Nelson, 1979, portrait artist and musician
- Jennifer Laura Thompson, 1987, Tony-nominated Broadway actress
- Wally Pleasant, 1985, singer-songwriter
- Raymond Kethledge, 1985, judge, United States Court of Appeals for the Sixth Circuit
- Rajiv Shah, 1991, president of the Rockefeller Foundation, administrator for the United States Agency for International Development (USAID)
- Jeff Katz, 1997, movie producer and broadcaster
- Jordan Gruber (born 1983), American-Israeli soccer player
- Jason Polan, 2000, artist
- Meryl Davis, 2005, Olympic medalist ice dancer
- Mike Posner, 2006, singer and pop star
- Annie Lazor, 2012, Olympic bronze medalist and swimmer
- Anthony Pittman, 2014, American football linebacker for the Detroit Lions of the National Football League
- Jaden Mangham, 2022, college football safety for the Michigan State Spartans and the Michigan Wolverines
- Ben Agosto, Olympic medalist ice dancer
- Erin Dilly, Tony-nominated Broadway actress
- Jeremy Moss, state senator
- Bruce Ableson, social media pioneer
- Sarah Pidgeon, actress
- Rachel Sussman, producer
- Grant Kwiecinski, DJ, songwriter, producer

== See also ==
- International Academy
