= Beverly Hills, Michigan =

- Village
- Village of Beverly Hills
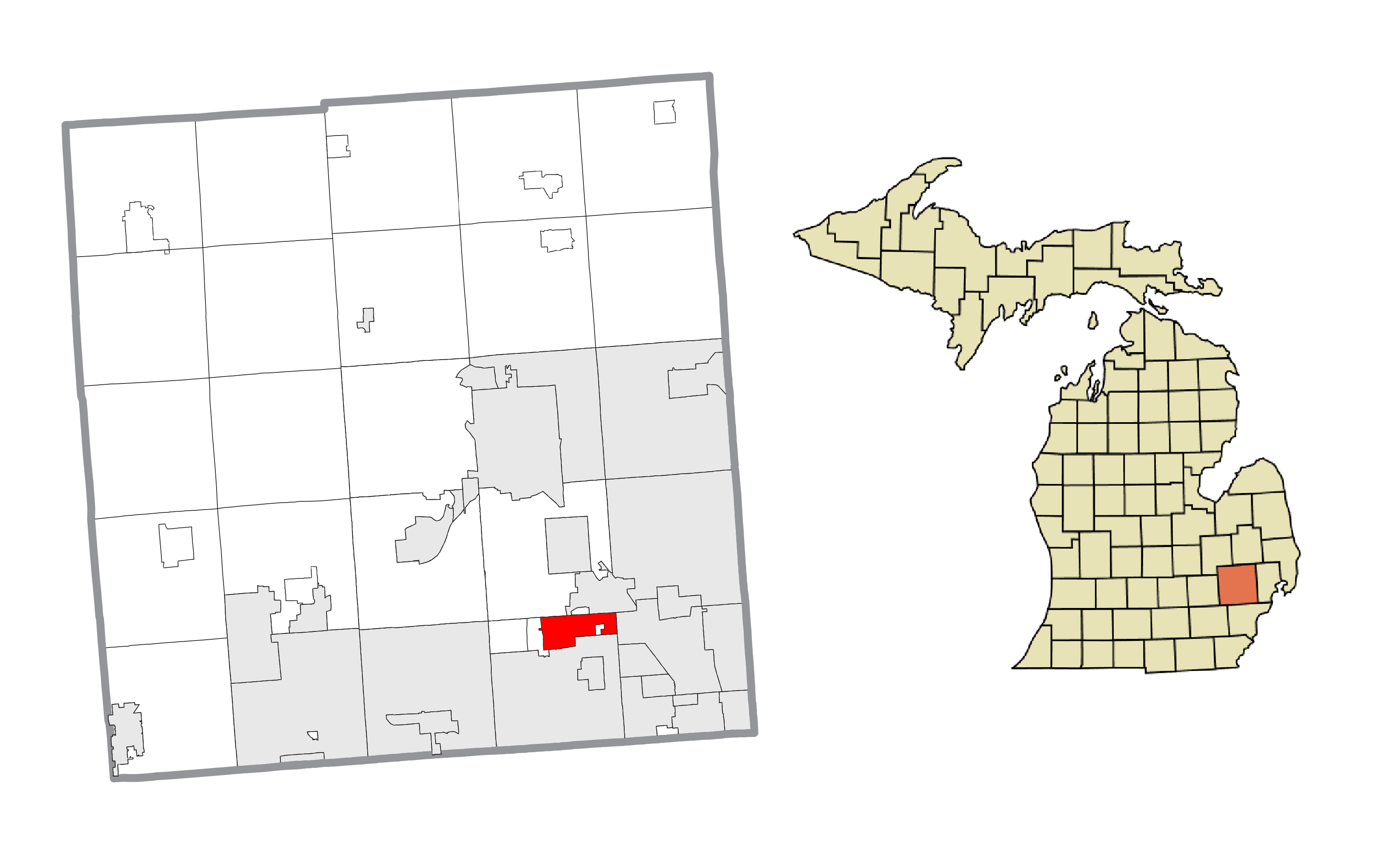
- Location within Oakland County

- Location within the state of Michigan Location within the United States
- Coordinates: 42°31′19″N 83°14′32″W
- Country: United States
- State: Michigan
- County: Oakland
- Township: Southfield
- Incorporated: 1958

Government
  - Type: Village council
  - President: John George
  - Clerk: Carissa Brown
  - Manager: Warren Rothe

Area
  - Village: 4.04 sq mi (10.47 km^{2})
  - Land: 4.03 sq mi (10.43 km^{2})
  - Water: 0.015 sq mi (0.04 km^{2})
- Elevation: 728 ft (222 m)

Population (2020)
  - Village: 10,584
  - Density: 2,628.7/sq mi (1,014.96/km^{2})
  - Metro: 4,296,250 (Metro Detroit)
- Time zone: UTC-5 (EST)
  - Summer (DST): UTC-4 (EDT)
- ZIP code(s): 48025 (Franklin)
- Area codes: 248
- FIPS code: 26-08160
- GNIS feature ID: 2398116
- Website: Official website

Beverly Hills is a village in Oakland County in the U.S. state of Michigan. A northern suburb of Detroit, Beverly Hills is located within Southfield Township, roughly 20 miles (32.2 km) northwest of downtown Detroit. As of the 2020 census, the village had a population of 10,599, making it the most populous village in the state by a wide margin.

== History ==
The area was incorporated as a village named Westwood in 1958. It was incorporated in the same year as the much larger city of Southfield to the south. By incorporating as a village, it prevented the area from being annexed into the city and allowed the village to retains its own autonomy. In 1959, the village changed its name to Beverly Hills.

== Geography ==
According to the United States Census Bureau, the village has a total area of 4.02 square miles (10.41 km^{2}), of which 4.00 square miles (10.36 km^{2}) is land and 0.02 square miles (0.05 km^{2}) is water, most of which is the main branch of the Rouge River.

== Government ==
=== Federal, state, and county legislators ===
United States House of Representatives
District	Representative	Party	Since
12th	Rashida Tlaib	Democratic	2023

Michigan Senate
District	Senator	Party	Since
7th	Jeremy Moss	Democratic	2023
8th	Mallory McMorrow	Democratic	2023

Michigan House of Representatives
District	Representative	Party	Since
5th	Natalie Price	Democratic	2023
19th	Samantha Steckloff	Democratic	2023

Oakland County Board of Commissioners
District	Commissioner	Party	Since
18	Linnie Taylor	Democratic	2023

== Demographics ==
Historical population
Census	Pop.	Note	%±
1960	8,633		—
1970	13,598		57.5%
1980	11,598		−14.7%
1990	10,610		−8.5%
2000	10,437		−1.6%
2010	10,267		−1.6%
2020	10,584		3.1%
U.S. Decennial Census

=== 2020 census ===
As of the 2020 census, Beverly Hills had a population of 10,584. The median age was 44.2 years. 23.9% of residents were under the age of 18 and 19.0% of residents were 65 years of age or older. For every 100 females there were 93.3 males, and for every 100 females age 18 and over there were 89.4 males age 18 and over.

100.0% of residents lived in urban areas, while 0.0% lived in rural areas.

There were 4,071 households in Beverly Hills, of which 34.4% had children under the age of 18 living in them. Of all households, 61.6% were married-couple households, 11.5% were households with a male householder and no spouse or partner present, and 23.9% were households with a female householder and no spouse or partner present. About 22.9% of all households were made up of individuals and 11.6% had someone living alone who was 65 years of age or older.

There were 4,221 housing units, of which 3.6% were vacant. The homeowner vacancy rate was 0.9% and the rental vacancy rate was 4.0%.

Racial composition as of the 2020 census
Race	Number	Percent
White	8,868	83.8%
Black or African American	732	6.9%
American Indian and Alaska Native	25	0.2%
Asian	307	2.9%
Native Hawaiian and Other Pacific Islander	0	0.0%
Some other race	83	0.8%
Two or more races	569	5.4%
Hispanic or Latino (of any race)	347	3.3%

=== 2010 census ===
As of the census of 2010, there were 10,267 people, 4,038 households, and 2,888 families living in the village. The population density was 2,566.8 inhabitants per square mile (991.0/km^{2}). There were 4,212 housing units at an average density of 1,053.0 per square mile (406.6/km^{2}). The racial makeup of the village was 89.2% White, 6.6% African American, 0.2% Native American, 2.0% Asian, 0.4% from other races, and 1.6% from two or more races. Hispanic or Latino of any race were 1.7% of the population.

There were 4,038 households, of which 34.0% had children under the age of 18 living with them, 60.5% were married couples living together, 8.4% had a female householder with no husband present, 2.6% had a male householder with no wife present, and 28.5% were non-families. 24.7% of all households were made up of individuals, and 11% had someone living alone who was 65 years of age or older. The average household size was 2.52 and the average family size was 3.04.

The median age in the village was 44.7 years. 25.1% of residents were under the age of 18; 5% were between the ages of 18 and 24; 20.5% were from 25 to 44; 32.1% were from 45 to 64; and 17.4% were 65 years of age or older. The gender makeup of the village was 47.8% male and 52.2% female.

=== 2000 census ===
As of the census of 2000, there were 10,437 people, 4,085 households, and 2,998 families living in the village. The population density was 2,603.6 inhabitants per square mile (1,005.3/km^{2}). There were 4,196 housing units at an average density of 1,046.7 per square mile (404.1/km^{2}). The racial makeup of the village was 93.21% White, 3.05% African American, 0.15% Native American, 1.85% Asian, 0.02% Pacific Islander, 0.29% from other races, and 1.44% from two or more races. Hispanic or Latino of any race were 1.41% of the population.

There were 4,085 households, out of which 33.0% had children under the age of 18 living with them, 64.8% were married couples living together, 6.3% had a female householder with no husband present, and 26.6% were non-families. 23.6% of all households were made up of individuals, and 10.8% had someone living alone who was 65 years of age or older. The average household size was 2.52 and the average family size was 3.01.

In the village, the population was spread out, with 24.6% under the age of 18, 4.0% from 18 to 24, 26.2% from 25 to 44, 26.1% from 45 to 64, and 19.1% who were 65 years of age or older. The median age was 42 years. For every 100 females, there were 91.4 males. For every 100 females age 18 and over, there were 87.5 males.

The median income for a household in the village was $90,341, and the median income for a family was $102,223. Males had a median income of $80,283 versus $49,265 for females. The per capita income for the village was $43,452. About 1.7% of families and 2.3% of the population were below the poverty line, including 1.5% of those under age 18 and 2.1% of those age 65 or over.

== Education ==
Beverly Hills is a part of the Birmingham Public School District. It is home to several public schools: Groves High School, Berkshire Middle School, Beverly Elementary, and Greenfield Elementary.

The upper school and administrative offices of the Detroit Country Day School, a private prep school, are in Beverly Hills. The school's middle school campus is also in Beverly Hills.

The French School of Detroit holds its middle school classes at Berkshire Middle School, and high school classes at Groves High School. Beverly Elementary School provides classes for FSD elementary school students.

Kensington Academy, a Catholic PK-8 school, previously had its campus in Beverly Hills. In 2006 the school announced that it was merging into the Academy of the Sacred Heart.

== Recreation ==
- Beverly Hills Athletic Club - summer swim and tennis club
- Beverly Hills Club - indoor tennis and fitness club
- Woodside Athletic Club - summer swim and tennis club

== Notable people ==
- Anita Barone, TV, film and stage actress, attended Groves High School
- Anna Garcia (born 1995), comedian and actress
- Jordan Gruber (born 1983), American-Israeli soccer player
- Mike Posner, singer and songwriter who attended Groves High School
- Charles Erwin Wilson (born 1890), U.S. Medal of Freedom Recipient, 5th U.S. Secretary of Defense, and President/CEO of General Motors interred at Acacia Park Cemetery (a Masonic cemetery)
