= International Academy =

Magnet high school in Bloomfield Township, Oakland County, Michigan, United States

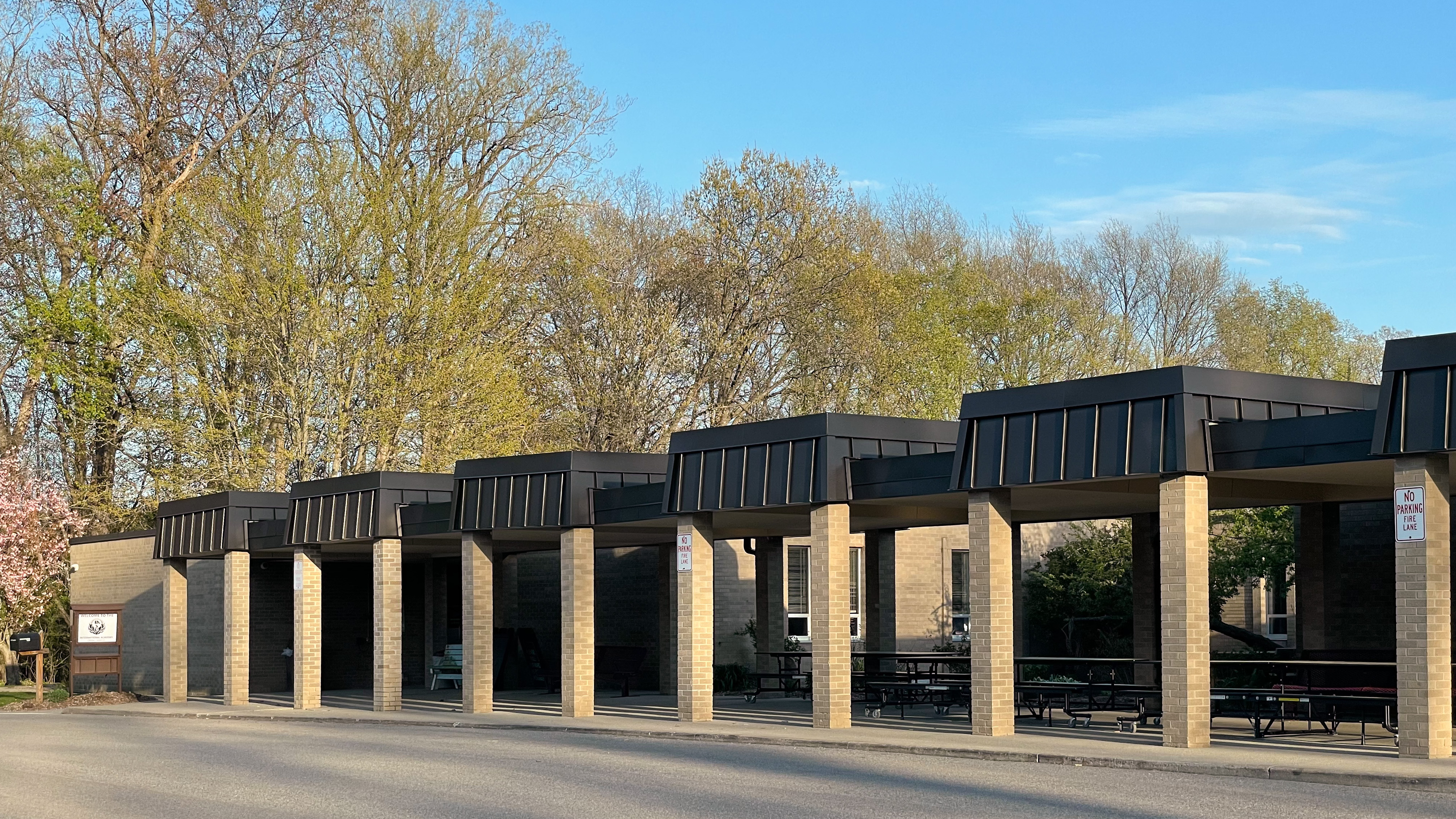
- Okma Campus

Location
- 1020 E. Square Lake Road; Bloomfield Hills, Oakland County, Michigan 48304-1957; United States; 42°36′11″N 83°13′33″W

Information
- School type: Public, magnet high school
- Motto: "A World of Learning"
- Established: 1996
- Founder: Lambert Okma
- School district: Bloomfield Hills School District
- Principal: Lynne Gibson
- Enrollment: 1337
- Colors: Navy blue and Silver
- Mascot: Phoenix
- Newspaper: The Overachiever
- Affiliation: International Baccalaureate
- Website: http://www.iatoday.org/

The International Academy (IA) is a public, magnet high school with its main campus located in Bloomfield Township, Oakland County, Michigan, with additional campuses in White Lake Township, Michigan and Troy, Michigan.

Students are required to earn both high school and International Baccalaureate (IB) diplomas. In 2020, according to IA, 92% of the graduates earned IB diplomas, compared to the world average of 79%.

== Foundation ==
The school was founded at the initiative of Lambert Okma, who proposed it to the Bloomfield Hills School District in 1992. Okma previously taught economics at Bloomfield Hills Lahser High School. While teaching at Lahser, Okma attended a series of seminars with the educational outreach coordinator of The Federal Reserve Bank of Detroit, where they discussed how they felt that there was a necessity for education to respond to rapidly increasing globalization. Their response was to propose "a high school with an emphasis on developing skills and personal attributes needed to succeed in the international arena, using the international baccalaureate as its core."

International Academy opened in August 1996 with Okma as principal, and the school had its first graduates in May 2000. The Okma campus is officially hosted by the Bloomfield Hills School District, and the campuses collectively are managed by a consortium consisting of the Avondale, Berkley, Birmingham, Bloomfield Hills, Clawson, Huron Valley, Lake Orion, Rochester, Royal Oak, South Lyon, Troy, Waterford, and West Bloomfield school districts.

Okma retired from his position as principal at the end of the 2008-09 year, though he continues to work as an IB consultant for other districts.

== Recognition ==
Student assessments
- 2021–22 school year Change vs. prior year

M-STEP 11th grade proficiency rates (Science / Social Studies)
- Advanced %: 62.8 / 41.7
- Proficient %: 26.7 / 42.6
- PR. Proficient %: 6.6 / –
- Not Proficient %: 3.9 / ≤1

Average test scores
- SAT Total: 1311.3 (▲ +10.8)

IA was recognized by Newsweek magazine as the top public school in the nation in 2003, second in 2004, second in 2005, ninth in 2006, seventh in 2007, twelfth in 2008, second in 2009, 25th in 2010, 20th in 2011, 5th in 2012, 18th in 2013, 9th in 2014, and 8th in 2015. Newsweek's standings were based on the number of IB (International Baccalaureate) or AP (Advanced Placement) tests that the school averaged per graduating senior. The IA's high rankings are due to the full diploma program being required of all students, meaning they each sit for at least 6 IB exams in May of their senior year. Each senior therefore takes at least six IB tests (in addition to the Theory of Knowledge course; Creativity, Action, & Service hours; and Extended Essay requirements), giving the school a high average number of IB tests.

IA was recognized by the U.S. News & World Report as the second-best public high school in the nation in December 2009. Again earning this #2 ranking in 2011. In 2014, IA dropped down to 9th ranking. In 2016, IA was once again ranked 9th. The U.S. news used "quality-adjusted tests per student" as the criteria. The International Academy was also named the best public IB program in the country, with an "IB Diploma per Grade 12 student enrolled" rate of 90.4%. In 2021, IA ranked No. 43 in the United States and No. 3 in Michigan among public high schools according to U.S. News & World Report. In 2024, they rose to No. 8 ranking nationally and No. 1 ranking in Michigan.

According to IA, the Class of 2018 average SAT scores were 659 for Evidence-based Reading and Writing, and 721 for Math. The average ACT composite score was a 29.7. In addition, 57 members (16%) of the Class of 2018 were named National Merit Scholars, 30 of whom were Finalists.

== Student life ==
Students are selected by lottery among the applicants. In 2004, the school enrollment was 576. International Academy has an extended school year (205 days) and an extended school day. At the end of the school day, many students stay to participate in after-school clubs, extra classes (jazz band or full orchestra), or meet with teachers and friends. Students may also participate in activities at their home schools. Students typically only participate in activities at their home high schools that the International Academy does not offer, including sports teams and marching bands.

=== Internationalism ===
The IA often classifies itself as an international school, and has a number of international students - about 10 to 15 percent of the student body attended a school overseas before coming to the IA. However, their families must move to one of the sending districts before coming to the IA. The IA does not have boarding students. The IA gives preference to international students (classified as students who have lived in the US for less than one year), as well as students coming from other IB schools (in the United States or elsewhere). The Central and East campuses have particularly large Asian-American populations (mainly from China, Korea, the Indian subcontinent, and the Middle East).

=== Athletics ===
The International Academy has no school-sponsored sports. When the IA was founded in 1996, it agreed not to sponsor sports teams when sending districts voiced concern that they would lose athletes to the IA. Students who wish to participate in sports or marching band must do so through their sending district. About one-third of the students participate in competitive sports or other activities through their home high schools.
The IA is allowed to have athletic teams which compete against other schools so long as they are completely student-run, with no funding from the school. In the past, students have started their own competitive teams, including a series of soccer teams, an Ultimate Frisbee club, and a competitive boys' basketball team. There are also school-funded intramural tournaments, such as a Paintball tournament and the annual IA Olympics, which consists of various competitive events, including athletic events, between the different grades at each campus. Currently, the primary student-led sports are run by The Table Tennis Association, The International Academy Cricket Association, and The Ultimate Frisbee Club.

== Facilities ==
The International Academy's Central Campus, the Okma Campus, is located in Bloomfield Township, Michigan in Metro Detroit, near Bloomfield Hills.

It is housed in the former site of Elizabeth Taylor Traub Elementary School. International Academy's Okma Campus building used to host Kensington Academy, a Catholic school.

Districts which send students to the Central Campus include Avondale, Bloomfield Hills, Berkley, Birmingham, Clawson, Lake Orion, Rochester, Royal Oak, Walled Lake, Waterford and West Bloomfield. The Farmington and Oxford districts have recently chosen to leave the IA consortium in order to start their own IB programs.

=== West Campus ===
The West campus was the first satellite campus of the International Academy. A satellite campus had been considered as early as 2003. This school first held classes in August 2006, and its first graduating class was the Class of 2010. The IA West campus is located inside Lakeland High School of Huron Valley Schools. The sending districts include Huron Valley and South Lyon. Their experience is similar to that of students on the Central Campus, with the exception of fewer options in foreign language (Spanish and French only). Like at the Central Campus, students play sports through their sending districts. Huron Valley Schools has opened up 10 spots for students in districts outside the International Academy consortium, including students living outside of Oakland County, for the Class of 2011 onward. Though initially successful, the West campus has seen its number of consortium districts dwindle as a result of district budget cuts and more districts (such as Fenton) opting to start their own IB programs rather than send students to the IA.

=== East Campus ===
IA has set up an Eastern campus in Troy, in the western half of the former Baker Middle School building. Classes were first held in the 2008-2009 school year. Like the other two campuses, the school began with one freshman class and has added another each year. The first graduating class graduated in 2012. This campus includes students from the Troy School District as well as school-of-choice students from other districts. Troy students through the Class of 2011 attended the Central campus. The Eastern campus's student body is about the same size as the Central campus, and students have access to the same classes as students at the Central campus, save for German, which was not added to the curriculum as the first incoming freshman class did not have a sufficient number of people who were interested in the course. The Eastern campus offers the same fine arts options as the Central campus.

== Notable alumni ==
- Julia Baritz, founder of social media website Pillowfort (class of 2009)
- Weike Wang, writer, winner of the 2018 PEN/Hemingway Award (class of 2007)

== See also ==
- International Baccalaureate
  - List of International Baccalaureate people
- Bloomfield Hills School District
- Huron Valley School District
  - Lakeland High School
- Troy School District
