= Lahser High School =

Coordinates: 42°35′28.7″N 83°15′59.1″W

Location
- 3456 Lahser Road; Bloomfield Hills, Michigan 48302; United States

Information
- Type: Public
- Established: 1967
- Closed: 2013
- School district: Bloomfield Hills Schools
- Final Principal: Charlie Hollerith
- Grades: 9-12
- Colors: Black and Gold
- Mascot: Knight
- Website: Lahser High School

Lahser High School was a high school in Bloomfield Township, Oakland County, Michigan, near Bloomfield Hills and in Greater Detroit. It was a part of Bloomfield Hills Schools. The school was opened in 1967. At the time it had 200 students, and enrollment later reached almost 900 students. In 2010, the decision was made to merge the school with sister school Andover High School, on Andover's grounds. In 2020, it was decided that the Lahser campus would become the site of Bloomfield Hills Middle School North following a successful bond proposal. The football program had five consecutive playoff-eligible seasons, 2002–2006, in both class 3 and class 2 MHSAA competition.

Lahser won several MHSAA state championships including: men's soccer (1999), men's/women's tennis (men's, 2002), women's lacrosse, and women's golf.

Lahser competed within the Oakland Activities Association Blue Division for football. Most of Lahser's students came from Bloomfield Hills and Bloomfield Township. Lahser's crosstown rival was Andover High School, which is the current site of the merged Bloomfield Hills High School

== Academic departments ==
Lahser offered several AP courses and introduced IB courses starting 2013. There were a variety of courses available to take, and departments include:

- Business
- Communication & Dramatic Arts
- Deaf/Hard of Hearing
- Engineering
- English
- Family & Consumer Science
- Health & Physical Education
- IB DP (International Baccalaureate Diploma Programme)
- Man in Nature (MIN)
- Math
- Model United Nations (MUN)
- Music & Theater Departments
- Science
- Social Studies
- Support Services or Directed Studies
- Visual Arts
- World Languages

== Notable alumni ==
- Tanith Belbin, 2006 Olympic ice dancing silver-medalist (attended 1999–2000)
- Sean Forbes, deaf American hip-hop artist (class of 2000)
- Armen Keteyian, investigative reporter (class of 1971)
- Yante Maten, basketball player at the University of Georgia and 2018 co-Player of the Year in the Southeastern Conference (class of 2014; graduated from Bloomfield Hills High)
- Ronna Romney McDaniel, chair of the Republican National Committee
- Chad Smith, drummer for the band Red Hot Chili Peppers (1980)
- Joe Hawley, singer and guitarist for the band Tally Hall (class of 2001)
- Ross Federman, singer and drummer for the band Tally Hall
- Pierce Codina, drummer for the band Divino Niño
- Neil Mandt, Emmy-winning TV and movie producer (attended 1985–1987)
- Milt Carthens, professional football player
