= Pitchfork Music Festival 2021 =

Music festival

- Dates: September 10–12, 2021
- Locations: Union Park, Chicago, United States
- Website: pitchforkmusicfestival.com

The Pitchfork Music Festival 2021 was held on September 10 to 12, 2021 at the Union Park, Chicago, United States. The festival was headlined by Erykah Badu, Phoebe Bridgers and St. Vincent. Indie rock band The Fiery Furnaces performed their first concert in over ten years during the festival.

== Lineup ==
Headline performers are listed in boldface. Artists listed from latest to earliest set times.

Green
| Friday, September 10 | Saturday, September 11 | Sunday, September 12 |
|---|---|---|
| **Phoebe Bridgers**; Animal Collective black midi DEHD; Armand Hammer | **St. Vincent**; Kim Gordon; Waxahatchee; Divino Niño; Horsegirl | **Erykah Badu**; Danny Brown; Caroline Polachek; KeiyaA; Cassandra Jenkins |

Red
| Friday, September 10 | Saturday, September 11 | Sunday, September 12 |
|---|---|---|
| Big Thief; The Fiery Furnaces; Hop Along; Dogleg | Angel Olsen; Ty Segall & Freedom Band; Amaarae; Bartees Strange | Flying Lotus; Thundercat; Mariah the Scientist; Special Interest |

Blue
| Friday, September 10 | Saturday, September 11 | Sunday, September 12 |
|---|---|---|
| Yaeji; Kelly Lee Owens; Ela Minus; The Soft Pink Truth; DJ Nate | RP Boo (Note: Jay Electronica was set to perform but cancelled due to unforeseen circumstances. He was replaced by RP Boo.); Jamila Woods; Georgia Anne Muldrow; Faye Webster; Maxo Kream | Cat Power; Andy Shauf; Yves Tumor; The Weather Station oso oso |
