= Bloomfield Township, Oakland County, Michigan =

Bloomfield Township, Michigan
- Charter township
- Charter Township of Bloomfield
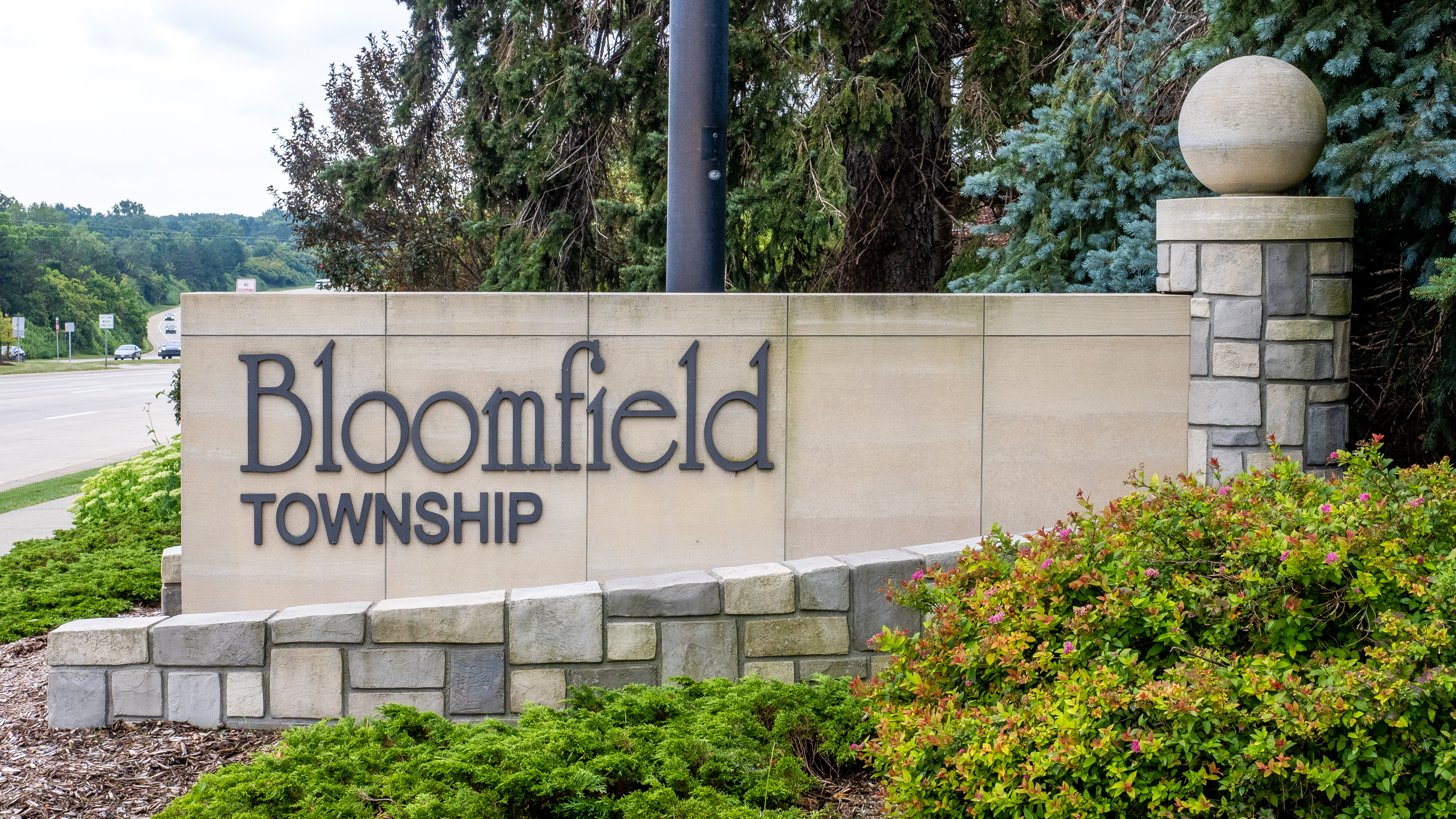
- Bloomfield Township Welcome Sign (2021)

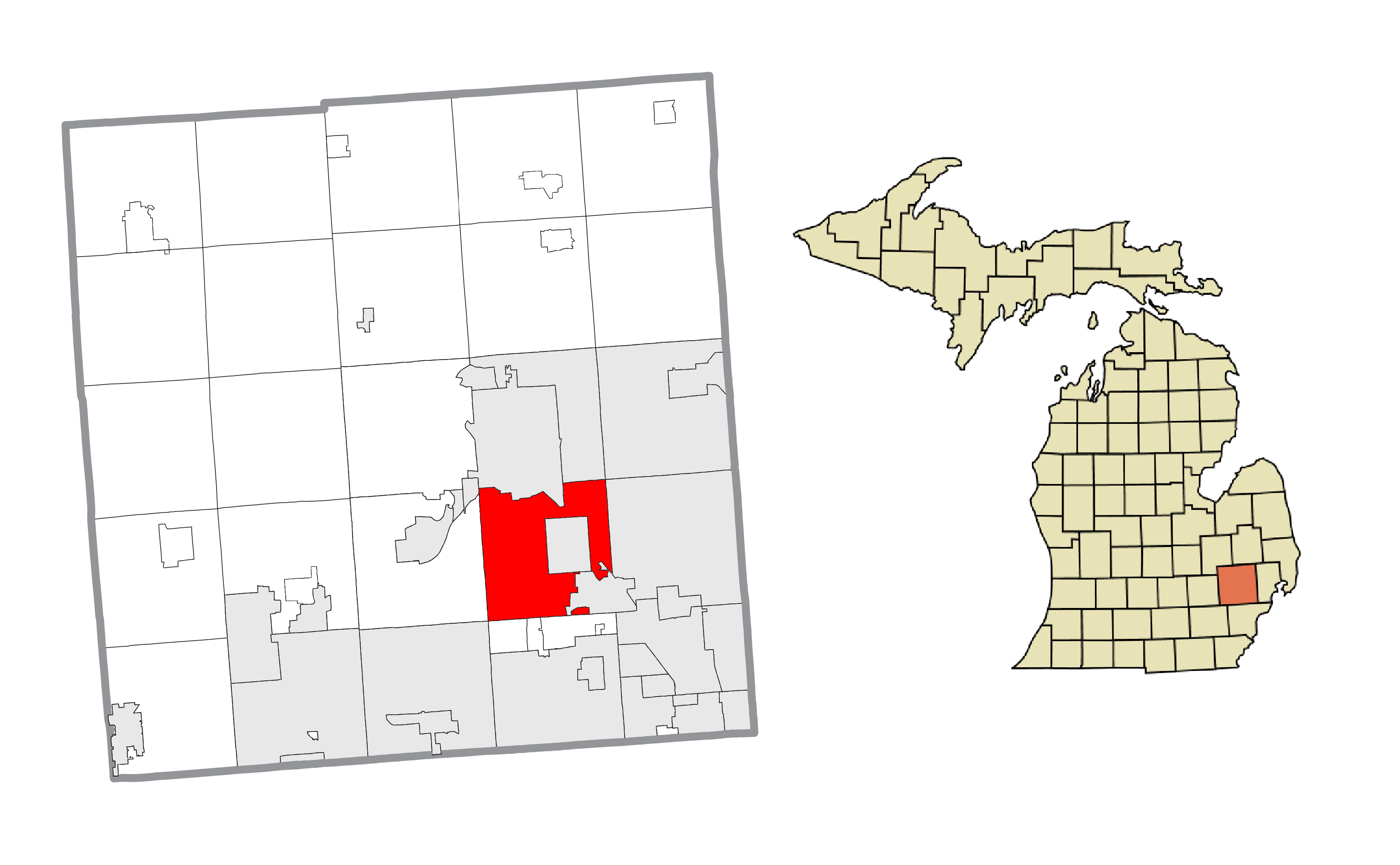
- Location within Oakland County

- Location within the state of Michigan
- Coordinates: 42°34′35″N 83°16′01″W
- Country: United States
- State: Michigan
- County: Oakland
- Established: 1827

Government
  - Supervisor: Mike McCready
  - Clerk: Martin Brook

Area
  - Charter township: 25.99 sq mi (67.3 km^{2})
  - Land: 24.63 sq mi (63.8 km^{2})
  - Water: 1.36 sq mi (3.5 km^{2})
- Elevation: 850 ft (260 m)

Population (2020)
  - Charter township: 44,253
  - Density: 2,395/sq mi (925/km^{2})
  - Metro: 4,296,250 (Metro Detroit)
- Time zone: UTC-5 (EST)
  - Summer (DST): UTC-4 (EDT)
- ZIP code(s): 48009 (Birmingham); 48025 (Franklin); 48301, 48302, 48304 (Bloomfield Hills); 48320 (Keego Harbor)
- Area codes: 248 and 947
- FIPS code: 26-09110
- GNIS feature ID: 1625952
- Website: Official website

Bloomfield Township is a charter township in Oakland County in the U.S. state of Michigan. A northern suburb of Detroit, Bloomfield Township is located roughly 20 miles (32 km) northwest of downtown Detroit. As of the 2020 census, the township had a population of 44,253.

Established in 1827, it is the oldest township in Oakland County.

== History ==
Labor union leader Jimmy Hoffa disappeared while in Bloomfield Township on July 30, 1975. He was last seen that afternoon in the parking lot of the Machus Red Fox restaurant. Six years later, to the day, Carlo Licata, the son of the acting boss of the Detroit Partnership crime syndicate, Jack Tocco, died under suspicious circumstances at a house off Long Lake Drive in Bloomfield Township. Hoffa had visited the house multiple times to visit Detroit Partnership members Anthony and Vito Giacalone.

== Communities ==
The Township has no incorporated villages and multiple unincorporated communities:

- Bloomfield Village is located between Quarton Road on the north, Maple Road on the south, Lahser Road on the west and Glenhurst and Westwood on the east. The non-governmental Bloomfield Village Association provides police and fire services to the community in concert with those provided by Bloomfield Township. It also provides other community-specific services.
- Charing Cross is located at Kensington and Charing Crossing Roads (42°34′18″N 83°13′17″W Elevation: 807 ft (246 m).) and previously had a railroad station.
- Circle had a post office from 1894 until 1902.
- Oak Grove is located on the boundary with Auburn Hills on South Blvd between Opdyke Road and I-75 (42°37′13″N 83°14′21″W Elevation: 883 ft (269 m).).

== Geography ==
According to the United States Census Bureau, the township has a total area of 25.99 square miles (67.31 km^{2}), of which 24.63 square miles (63.79 km^{2}) is land and 1.36 square miles (3.5 km^{2}) (5.23%) is water.

The city of Bloomfield Hills, most of Birmingham, and part of Pontiac are within the original survey township. Bloomfield Township borders Pontiac and Auburn Hills to the north; Sylvan Lake and West Bloomfield Township to the west; Troy and Birmingham to the east; and Franklin, Bingham Farms, and Beverly Hills to the south.

The main branch of the Rouge River rises in the township in Oakland County.

== Government ==
=== Federal, state, and county legislators ===
United States House of Representatives
| District | Representative | Party | Since |
|---|---|---|---|
| 11th | Haley Stevens | Democratic | 2023 (Note: Stevens has represented the 11th district since 2019, but the district has only included Bloomfield Township since 2023.) |

Michigan Senate
| District | Senator | Party | Since |
|---|---|---|---|
| 7th | Jeremy Moss | Democratic | 2023 |

Michigan House of Representatives
| District | Representative | Party | Since |
|---|---|---|---|
| 19th | Samantha Steckloff | Democratic | 2023 |
| 20th | Noah Arbit | Democratic | 2023 |
| 54th | Donni Steele | Republican | 2023 |
| 56th | Sharon MacDonnell | Democratic | 2023 |

Oakland County Board of Commissioners
| District | Commissioner | Party | Since |
|---|---|---|---|
| 9 | Angela Powell | Democratic | 2021 |
| 11 | Marcia Gershenson | Democratic | 2005 |

== Demographics ==
As of the census of 2000, there were 43,023 people, 16,804 households, and 12,703 families residing in the township. The population density was 1,724.5 inhabitants per square mile (665.8/km^{2}). There were 17,455 housing units at an average density of 699.7 units per square mile (270.2 units/km^{2}). The racial makeup of the township was 87.70% White, 4.30% Black or African American, 0.08% Native American, 6.47% Asian, 0.05% Pacific Islander, 0.29% from other races, and 1.11% from two or more races. Hispanic or Latino residents of any race were 1.38% of the population.

There were 16,804 households, out of which 31.1% had children under the age of 18 living with them, 68.1% were married couples living together, 5.7% had a female householder with no husband present, and 24.4% were non-families. 21.6% of all households were made up of individuals, and 9.3% had someone living alone who was 65 years of age or older. The average household size was 2.53 and the average family size was 2.97.

In the township, 23.8% of the population was under the age of 18, 4.2% from 18 to 24, 21.7% from 25 to 44, 32.5% from 45 to 64, and 17.8% was 65 years of age or older. The median age was 45 years. For every 100 females, there were 94.1 males. For every 100 females age 18 and over, there were 91.2 males.

The median income for a household in the township was $103,897, and the median income for a family was $123,381 (These figures had risen to $119,233 and $144,033 as of a 2007 estimate). Males had a median income of $98,985 versus $50,540 for females. The per capita income for the township was $62,716. About 1.2% of families and 2.5% of the population were below the poverty line, including 3.0% of those under age 18 and 3.1% of those age 65 or over.

== Culture ==
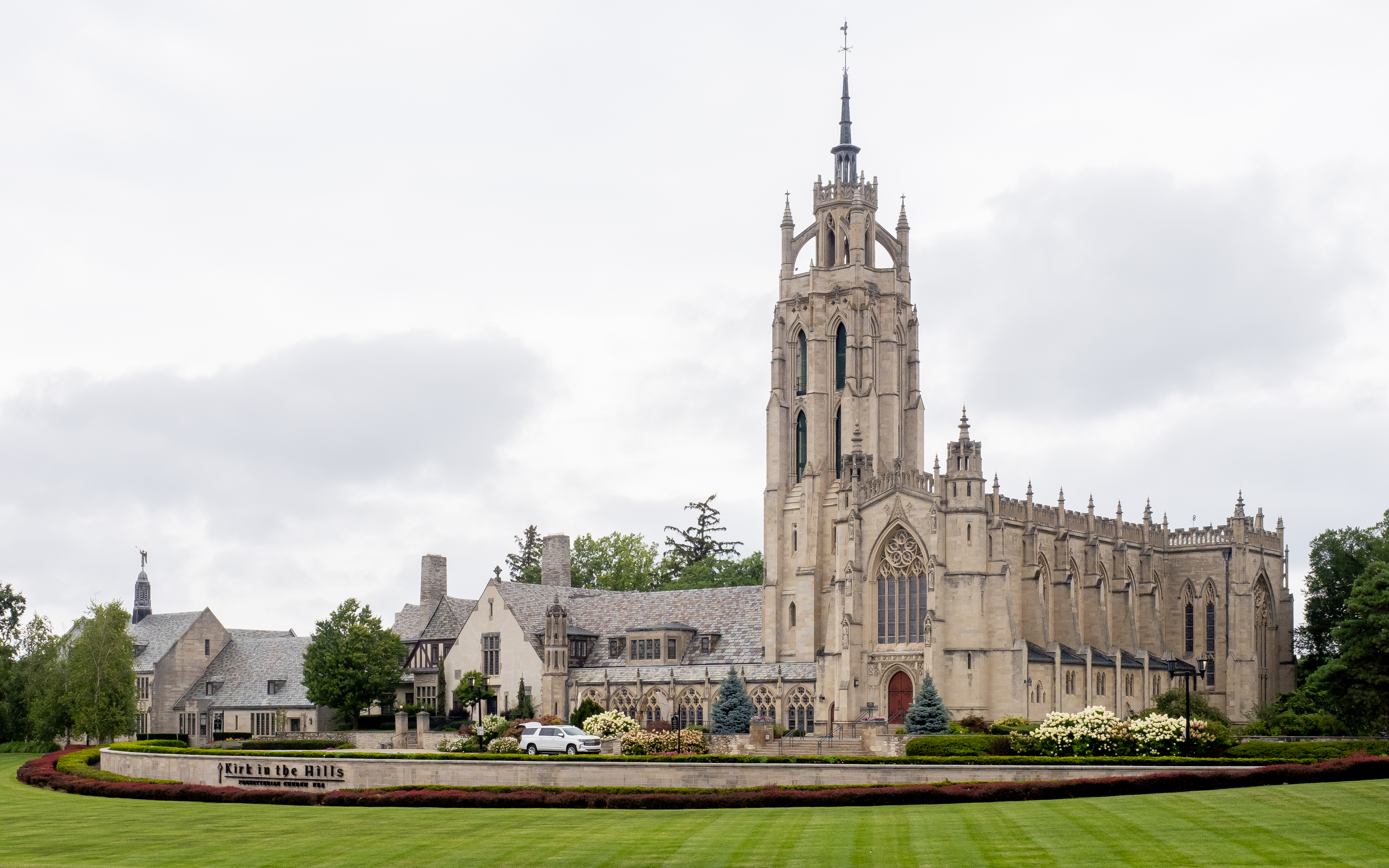
Kirk in the Hills

Oakland Hills Country Club in Bloomfield Township has been host to a number of major professional golf events, including six U.S. Opens and the 2004 Ryder Cup.

Bloomfield Township is also home to the Detroit Skating Club where a number of figure skaters have trained, including single skaters Tara Lipinski, Todd Eldredge, Alissa Czisny, Adam Rippon, Jeremy Abbott and ice dancers Nathalie Pechalat/Fabian Bourzat, Kaitlyn Weaver/Andrew Poje, Naomi Lang/Peter Tchernyshev, Elizabeth Punsalan/Jerod Swallow. Coaches based at the DSC include Yuka Sato, Jason Dungjen (single skating), Anjelika Krylova, Pasquale Camerlengo, Massimo Scali, Elizabeth Punsalan, Natalia Annenko-Deller (ice dancing).

== Education ==
=== Primary and secondary schools ===
==== Public school districts ====
The township's primary public school district is Bloomfield Hills School District (BHS), but large portions of the southeast corner and western edges of the township are in Birmingham Public Schools (BPS) and a portion of the northeast corner is in Avondale School District. Another portion is in the Pontiac School District.

The sole BHS district comprehensive high school is Bloomfield Hills High School in Bloomfield Township, formed in 2013 by the mergers of Andover High School and Lahser High School.

Two portions of Bloomfield Township are in the Birmingham Public Schools district (BPS). Students in the southeastern portion of the township, wrapping around the city of Birmingham, are zoned to one of four elementary schools (Harlan, Pembroke, Pierce, or Quarton), Derby Middle School, and Seaholm High School. Students in a small portion Bloomfield Township northwest of the intersection of Fourteen Mile Rd. and Lahser Rd. are zoned to Bingham Farms Elementary, Berkshire Middle School, and Groves High School. Students on the western side of the township, along with portions of BPS that extend into West Bloomfield Township, are zoned to West Maple Elementary, Berkshire Middle School, and Groves High School.

A portion of northeast Bloomfield Township is within the Avondale School District. Students in that section are zoned to R. Grant Graham Elementary School in Auburn Hills, Avondale Middle School in Rochester Hills, and Avondale High School in Auburn Hills.

=== Private schools and international programs ===
The Lower School and Junior School campuses of the Detroit Country Day School are located in the township as are Academy of the Sacred Heart, Brother Rice High School, Marian High School, and the International Academy, a magnet school run by BHS. Other private schools including Cranbrook Schools, The Roeper School, and St. Hugo have campuses located just inside nearby Bloomfield Hills and Birmingham.

The French School of Detroit has its administrative offices at Meadow Lake Elementary School in the township. Preschool classes are held at Meadow Lake, while elementary school students attend classes at Meadow Lake and at any one of four partner elementary schools, including West Maple Elementary in Bloomfield Township.

Kensington Academy, a Catholic boy's elementary and middle school, first opened on the Sacred Heart campus in 1969. It moved into its own facility in 1982. In 2006 it announced that it was merging with Sacred Heart. At one time it occupied a facility in Bloomfield Township.

The Japanese School of Detroit, a weekend supplementary education program for Japanese nationals of primary and secondary school age, first started holding classes at Kensington Academy in 1981. It later had its school offices in the former Kensington Academy facility in Bloomfield Township.

== Notable people ==
- Aretha Franklin, soul singer; born in Tennessee, resided in Bloomfield Township
- Fred Blanding, pitcher with the Cleveland Naps; grew up in Bloomfield
- Ryan Kesler, National Hockey League player resides in Bloomfield in the offseason
- Bob Kula, football player
- Abby Quinn, actress, native of Bloomfield
- Elizabeth Reaser, film, television, and stage actress (The Twilight Saga and Grey's Anatomy); born in Bloomfield
- Mitt Romney, former Governor of Massachusetts and presidential candidate, grew up in Bloomfield and attended Cranbrook Schools
- Chad Smith, musician, drummer (Red Hot Chili Peppers and Chickenfoot), Rock and Roll Hall of Fame member; graduate of Bloomfield Lahser High School, 1980
- Robin Williams, actor and comedian, grew up in Bloomfield
- Andy Levin, former U.S. Congressman for the 9th district of Michigan, resides in Bloomfield Township

== See also ==
- Bloomfield Hills Schools
- Detroit Country Day School
- Detroit Skating Club
- Kirk in the Hills
- Oakland Hills Country Club
- Woodward Corridor

== Notes ==
1. Stevens has represented the 11th district since 2019, but the district has only included Bloomfield Township since 2023.
