= Bloomfield Hills High School =

High school in Bloomfield Township, Oakland County, Michigan

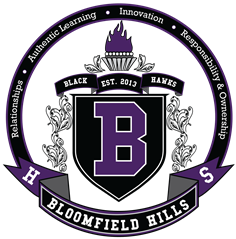

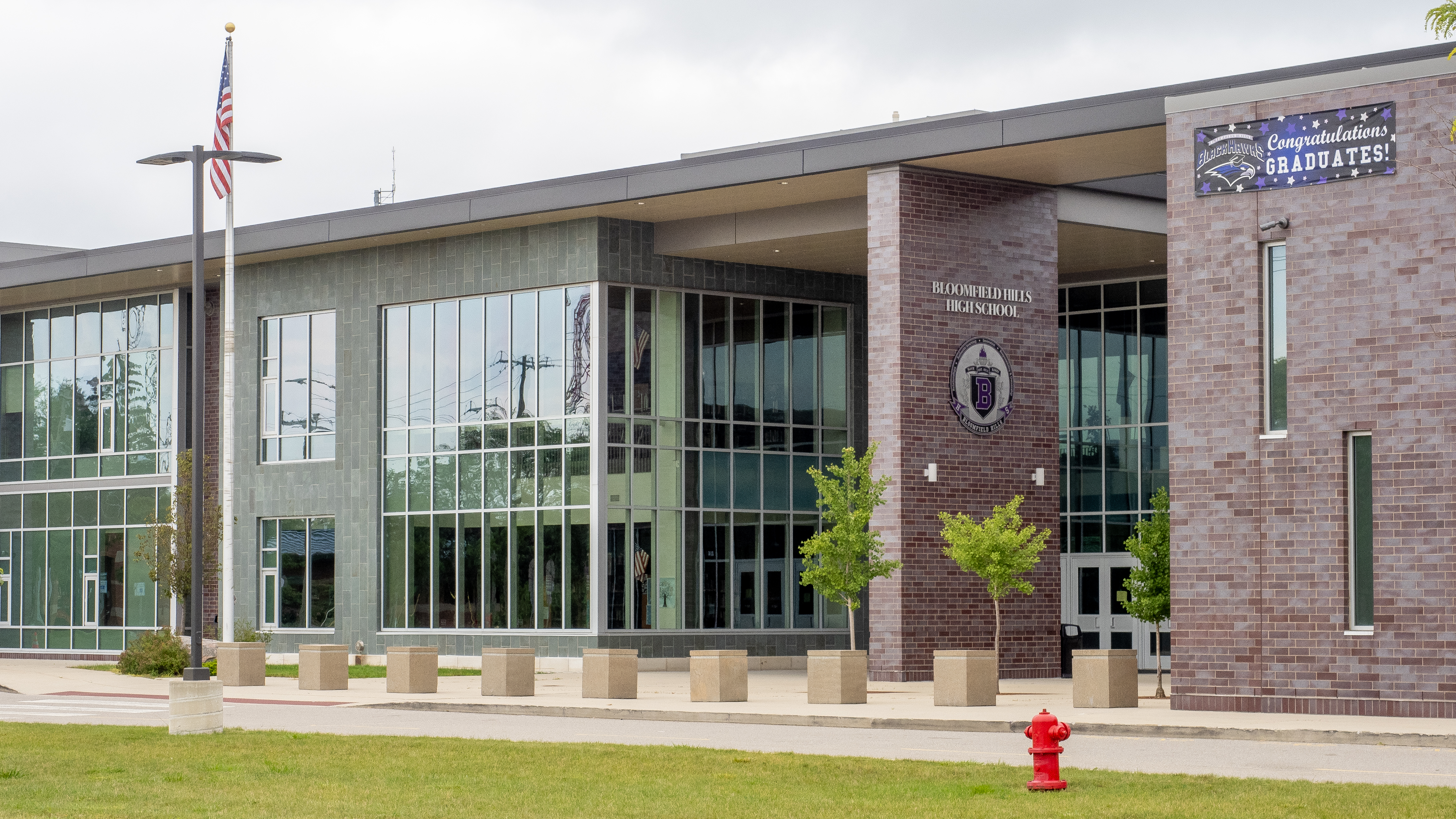

Location
- 4200 Andover Road; Bloomfield Hills, Michigan 48302; United States; 42.57911°N 83.28548°W

Information
- Other name: BHHS
- Type: Public high school
- Established: 2013
- School district: Bloomfield Hills Schools
- NCES School ID: 260609008480
- Principal: Daniel Hartley
- Teaching staff: 100.53 (on an FTE basis)
- Grades: 9–12
- Enrollment: 1,567 (2023-2024)
- Student to teacher ratio: 15.59
- Colors: Purple, Black, and Silver
- Athletics conference: Oakland Activities Association
- Nickname: Black Hawks
- Newspaper: The Hawkeye
- Website: bhhs.bloomfield.org

Student assessments
- 2021–22 school year Change vs. prior year

M-STEP 11th grade proficiency rates (Science / Social Studies)
- Advanced %: 30.4 / 21.0
- Proficient %: 28.0 / 33.9
- PR. Proficient %: 13.6 / 38.6
- Not Proficient %: 28.0 / 6.6

Average test scores
- SAT Total: 1075.8 (▼ −52.7)

Bloomfield Hills High School (BHHS) is a public high school in Bloomfield Township, Michigan, United States. It is the sole comprehensive high school of the Bloomfield Hills School District and was established in 2013, when the district merged Andover and Lahser High Schools.

== History ==
In 2010, the Bloomfield Hills School Board began discussing a move to merge Andover and Lahser High schools and build a new high school that would reside on Andover's grounds. The plan included provisions for Lahser's athletic facilities to be kept for use by the new high school. In fall of 2015, students transferred from the two main campuses to a new building known as BHHS. The neighboring Model Center was built as the replacement for the Model High School, which was part of Bloomfield Hills Schools district.

As part of a 2020 bond proposal, new infrastructure is planned to be installed within the school including enhanced security, upgraded network and wireless capabilities, and turf baseball and softball fields.

In the 2020 spring season, BHHS first fielded its school ESports team.

== Extracurricular activities ==
The Hawkeye, BHHS's school newspaper, has won several awards at the state level for print journalism. Additionally, the paper regularly operates its own website.

BHHS offers over 50 clubs, alliances, and student groups for students to participate in at the extracurricular level.

=== Athletics ===
Fall season:

- Girls' Swimming & Diving
- Cross country
- Equestrian
- Girls' field hockey
- Boys' football
- Girls' golf
- Pomp pon
- Boys' soccer
- Boys' tennis
- Girls' volleyball

Winter season:

- Boys' Swimming & Diving
- Boys' basketball
- Girls' basketball
- Bowling
- E-sports
- Figure skating
- Girls' gymnastics
- Boys' ice hockey
- Girls' ice hockey
- Pom pon
- Boys' skiing
- Girls' skiing

Spring season:

- Boys' baseball
- Boys' golf
- Boys' lacrosse
- Girls' lacrosse
- Girls' soccer
- Girls' softball
- Girls' tennis
- Boys' track and field
- Girls' track and field

== Notable alumni ==
- Yante Maten (2014), NBA player
- John Paddock (2018), NFL quarterback
