= Yante Maten =

American basketball player (born 1996)

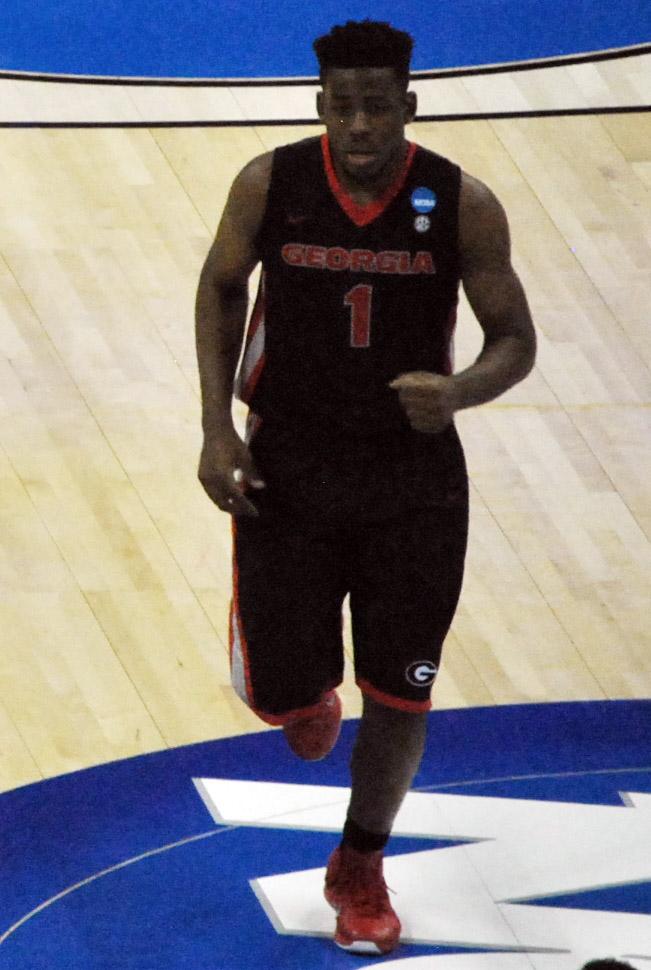
- Maten playing for Georgia in 2015

Free agent
- Position: Power forward

Personal information
- Born: August 14, 1996 (age 30) Pontiac, Michigan, U.S.
- Listed height: 6 ft 8 in (2.03 m)
- Listed weight: 240 lb (109 kg)

Career information
- High school: Lahser (Bloomfield Hills, Michigan); Bloomfield Hills (Bloomfield Hills, Michigan)
- College: Georgia (2014–2018)
- NBA draft: 2018: undrafted
- Playing career: 2018–present

Career history
- 2018–2019: Miami Heat
- 2018–2019: →Sioux Falls Skyforce
- 2019–2020: Maine Red Claws
- 2020–2021: Wonju DB Promy
- 2022: Hapoel Tel Aviv
- 2022–2026: San-en NeoPhoenix

Career highlights
- SEC Player of the Year – AP (2018); 2× First-team All-SEC (2017, 2018); Second-team All-SEC (2016)
- Stats at NBA.com
- Stats at Basketball Reference

Yante Khaaliq Daiyann Maten (born August 14, 1996) is an American professional basketball player who last played for San-en NeoPhoenix of the Japanese B.League. He played college basketball for the University of Georgia. A 6’7” power forward from Pontiac, Michigan, Maten won SEC Player of the Year by the Associated Press as a senior.

== College career ==
After starring at Lahser High School for three years until its closure in 2013, and then in the 2013–14 season at its successor, Bloomfield Hills High School, Maten surprised recruiting experts by selecting Georgia over Indiana and home state school Michigan State.

After a breakout sophomore year where he was named second-team All-Southeastern Conference (SEC) by the league's coaches, Maten enjoyed a strong individual junior season, marred by a knee injury and the Bulldogs’ mediocre 19–14 record. After averaging 18.2 points and 6.8 rebounds per game, he was named first-team All-SEC by the leagues’ coaches and second-team by the Associated Press. He was also named as a finalist for the Kareem Abdul-Jabbar Award for the nation's top center (despite starting the season on the watch list for the Karl Malone Award for top power forward).

Following his junior season, Maten declared his eligibility for the 2017 NBA draft without an agent, leaving open the possibility of returning to Georgia for his senior year. Ultimately, after working out for NBA teams he decided to return to Georgia for his senior year to improve his draft position.

Prior to the start of the 2017–18 season, Maten was named the preseason SEC co-Player of the Year (with Texas A&M forward Robert Williams and incoming Missouri freshman Michael Porter Jr.). After a strong start to the season, Maten was named to the John R. Wooden Award midseason top 25 watch list on January 10, one of only two SEC players to be so recognized. Maten won SEC Player of the Year by the Associated Press and was named to the All-SEC First Team.

== Professional career ==
=== Miami Heat (2018–2019) ===
After not being selected in the 2018 NBA draft, Maten signed a two-way contract with the Miami Heat of the National Basketball Association (NBA) on July 29, 2018. Under the terms of the deal, he split his time between the Heat and their NBA G League affiliate, the Sioux Falls Skyforce. On December 2, 2018, Maten scored a career-high 42 points to go along with 14 rebounds and 3 blocks in a 113–108 win over the Stockton Kings. Maten was named NBA G League Player of the Month for December 2018. On April 7, 2019, the Heat signed Maten to a standard NBA contract. On July 29, 2019, Maten was waived by the Miami Heat.

=== Maine Red Claws (2019–2020) ===
On September 17, 2019, Maten was reported to have signed with the Boston Celtics. On October 20, 2019, Maten was reported to have waived by the Celtics. On October 26, 2019, Maten was included in the training camp roster of the Maine Red Claws.

=== Wonju DB Promy (2020–2021) ===
Maten joined Wonju DB Promy of the Korean Basketball League for the 2020–21 season.

=== Hapoel Tel Aviv (2022) ===
On April 23, 2022, Maten signed with Hapoel Tel Aviv of the Israeli Premier League.

== Career statistics ==
=== Professional ===
Legend
GP	Games played	MPG	Minutes per game	FG%	Field goal percentage
3P%	3-point field goal percentage	FT%	Free throw percentage	RPG	Rebounds per game
APG	Assists per game	SPG	Steals per game	BPG	Blocks per game
PPG	Points per game	**Bold**	Career high		Led the league

Year	Team	League	GP	MPG	FG%	3P%	FT%	RPG	APG	SPG	BPG	PPG
2018–19	Sioux Falls Skyforce	NBA G League	30	**32.7**	.539	**.327**	**.777**	**9.6**	**1.8**	.8	**1.1**	23.5
2018–19	Miami Heat	NBA	2	6.5	.250	.000	.000	1.5	.0	.5	.0	1.0
2019–20	Maine Red Claws	NBA G League	**39**	28.8	**.545**	.247	.712	8.8	**1.8**	**1.0**	.8	18.1
Career		All Leagues	71	29.8	.541	.291	.754	9.0	1.8	.9	.9	19.9

=== College ===
Year	Team	GP	GS	MPG	FG%	3P%	FT%	RPG	APG	SPG	BPG	PPG
2014–15	Georgia	32	2	18.2	.416	.000	.648	4.3	.3	.3	1.4	5.0
2015–16	Georgia	**34**	**34**	30.0	.496	**.533**	.783	8.0	.8	.3	**1.8**	16.5
2016–17	Georgia	29	28	29.0	**.519**	.488	.716	6.8	**1.5**	**.7**	1.5	18.2
2017–18	Georgia	33	33	**34.3**	.464	.341	**.801**	**8.6**	**1.5**	.5	1.5	**19.3**
Career		128	97	27.9	.483	.403	.755	6.9	1.0	.4	1.6	14.7
