= John Paddock (American football) =

American football player (born 2000)

Profile
- Position: Quarterback

Personal information
- Born: March 27, 2000 (age 26)
- Listed height: 6 ft 0 in (1.83 m)
- Listed weight: 190 lb (86 kg)

Career information
- High school: Bloomfield Hills (Bloomfield Hills, Michigan)
- College: Ball State (2018–2022); Illinois (2023)
- NFL draft: 2024: undrafted

Career history
- Atlanta Falcons (2024)*
- * Offseason or practice squad member only

John Paddock (born March 27, 2000) is an American former football quarterback. He played college football at Ball State and Illinois.

== Early life ==
Paddock attended Bloomfield Hills High School in Bloomfield Hills, Michigan. He was rated as a two-star recruit by Rivals.com and committed to play college football at the Ball State University.

== College career ==
=== Ball State ===
In Paddock's first four seasons with Ball State, he appeared in only four games as a backup quarterback, completing 24 of 32 passes for 180 yards and an interception. He earned the starting job ahead of the 2022 season. In week 3, Paddock completed 27 of 44 passing attempts for 227 yards and three touchdowns with one interception in his first win as a starter, shutting out Murray State. He finished the 2022 season completing 286 of 480 pass attempts for 2,719 yards and 18 touchdowns with 14 interceptions, going 5-7 as a starter. After the season, Paddock entered the NCAA transfer portal.

=== Illinois ===
Paddock transferred to the University of Illinois as a walk-on for his final season. In week 9 of the 2023 season, he entered the game in the fourth quarter down by one score after starter Luke Altmyer went down with an injury. Paddock completed all three of his passes for 85 yards including the game-winning touchdown as he helped Illinois beat Minnesota 27-26. He started the following week, throwing for 507 yards and four touchdowns with one interception in a 48–45 overtime win over Indiana.

== Professional career ==
Pre-draft measurables
Height	Weight	Arm length	Hand span	40-yard dash	10-yard split	20-yard split	20-yard shuttle	Three-cone drill	Vertical jump	Broad jump
5 ft 11 1/4 in (1.81 m)	193 lb (88 kg)	29 3/8 in (0.75 m)	9 5/8 in (0.24 m)	4.95 s	1.68 s	2.88 s	4.50 s	7.46 s	28.0 in (0.71 m)	9 ft 4 in (2.84 m)
All values from Pro Day

Paddock signed with the Atlanta Falcons as an undrafted free agent on April 28, 2024. He was waived on August 25.
