= Andover High School (Michigan) =

Location
- Bloomfield Township, Michigan, United States; 42°34′44″N 83°17′9″W

Information
- Status: Closed
- Closed: 2013
- Colors: Navy and White
- Mascot: Barons
- Website: http://andover.bloomfield.org

Andover High School was a public high school in Bloomfield Township, Oakland County, Michigan, near Bloomfield Hills and in Greater Detroit. It was a part of the Bloomfield Hills School District. The school's final principal was Rob Durecka. The school teams were known as the Andover Barons.

In 2010, the decision was made to merge Andover and Lahser High schools and build a single high school on the current Andover property.

In 2013 it was merged into Bloomfield Hills High School, which is located on the former Andover campus. The new combined high school opened in the fall of 2015.

== History ==
Andover High School, originally named Bloomfield Hills High School, opened in the fall of 1931. It presided on Vaughan Road, built on land donated to the district by George Gough Booth. In 1936, Bloomfield Hills High School had its first graduating class of only eight students. Due to the expanding population growth in the area, a larger school was necessary. This came into fruition in 1955 when Bloomfield Hills High School moved to its new location on Andover Road. However, sizing again became a problem, only this time a new school was built. In 1967, it was renamed Andover High School, as a second high school, Lahser, opened in the district. The two schools merged in 2013 to become the new Bloomfield Hills High School.

== Academics ==
Over 98% of Andover's graduates attended college after graduation, and the actual graduation rate was about 97%. Average SAT scores for Andover were (1233/1600), above the national average. Two Andover alumni have won the Rhodes Scholarship to study at the University of Oxford, in the UK. Wen Shi (Johns Hopkins University) won the award in 2003, and Abdul El-Sayed (University of Michigan) won it in 2008. One Andover alumnus won the Goldwater Scholarship, Andrew Zureick (Dartmouth College), in 2012 for excellence in the sciences.

== Sports ==
=== State Championships ===
Men's Soccer

- 1978

Men's Track

- 1938
- 1939
- 1948

Men's Golf

- 1980
- 1992

Men's Tennis

- 1997
- 2002
- 2004
- 2005

Men's Swimming and Diving

- 1986
- 1990
- 1991
- 1992
- 1993
- 1994
- 1995
- 1996
- 1997

Women's Swimming and Diving

- 1980
- 1981
- 1982
- 1983
- 1984
- 1986

== Notable alumni ==
- Lawrence Bacow, President of Harvard University
- Richard Bernstein, Michigan Supreme Court Justice
- Lisa Brown, Michigan state representative
- Rob Cantor, singer and guitarist for the band Tally Hall
- Jonathan Chait, writer
- Abdul El-Sayed, former public health official elected as U.S. Senator representing Michigan in 2026
- Sheri Fink, Pulitzer Prize-winning journalist
- Dana Jacobson, sports news anchor
- Colin Kroll, Founder of Vine and HQ Trivia
- Shalina D. Kumar, attorney and US district judge
- Rick Lax, entertainer and author
- Marcus Sakey, TV host, writer; author of The Blade Itself
- Zubin Sedghi, singer and bassist for the band Tally Hall
- Chad Smith, drummer for Red Hot Chili Peppers (moved to Lahser High School where he graduated in 1980)
- Alex Winston, musician

== The Andover Shield ==
The Andover Shield was Andover High School's award-winning newspaper. In recent years, the newspaper and its staff have won many MIPA awards and was first honored with a Spartan award in 2007.
