= Southeastern Conference Men's Basketball Player of the Year =

Honor awarded to college basketball players

SEC Men's Basketball Player of the Year
- Awarded for: the most outstanding basketball player in the Southeastern Conference
- Country: United States

History
- First award: 1965
- Most recent: Darius Acuff Jr., Arkansas

The Southeastern Conference Men's Basketball Player of the Year is an award given to the most outstanding player in the Southeastern Conference (SEC). The school with the most SEC Player of the Year award winners is Kentucky, with 18 total awards. The only current SEC members that have never had a winner are Missouri, Texas A&M, Texas, and Oklahoma, who are the conference's two newest members (the first two joining in 2012 and the latter two in 2024).

Three different organizations have given this award: United Press International (1965–1992), Associated Press (1965–present), and the SEC coaches (1987–present).

== Key ==
†	Co-Players of the Year
*	Awarded a national player of the year award that same season: Helms Foundation College Basketball Player of the Year (1904–05 to 1978–79); UPI College Basketball Player of the Year (1954–55 to 1995–96); Oscar Robertson Trophy (1958–59 to present); Naismith College Player of the Year (1968–69 to present); John R. Wooden Award (1976–77 to present)
A	Associated Press selection (1965–present)
C	SEC coaches' selection (1987–present)
U	United Press International selection (1965–1992)
Player (X)	Denotes the number of times the player received the SEC Player of the Year award at that point

== Winners ==
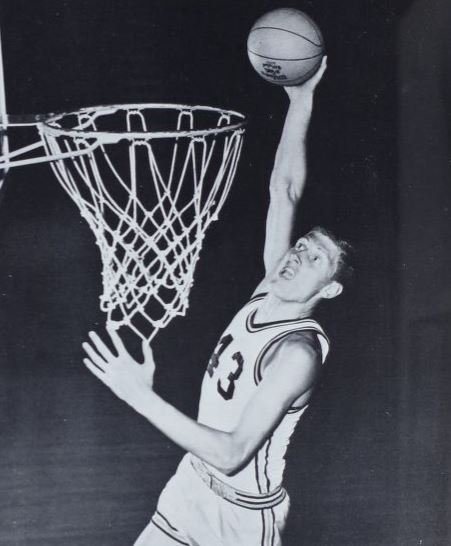
Clyde Lee, Vanderbilt, 1965 and 1966

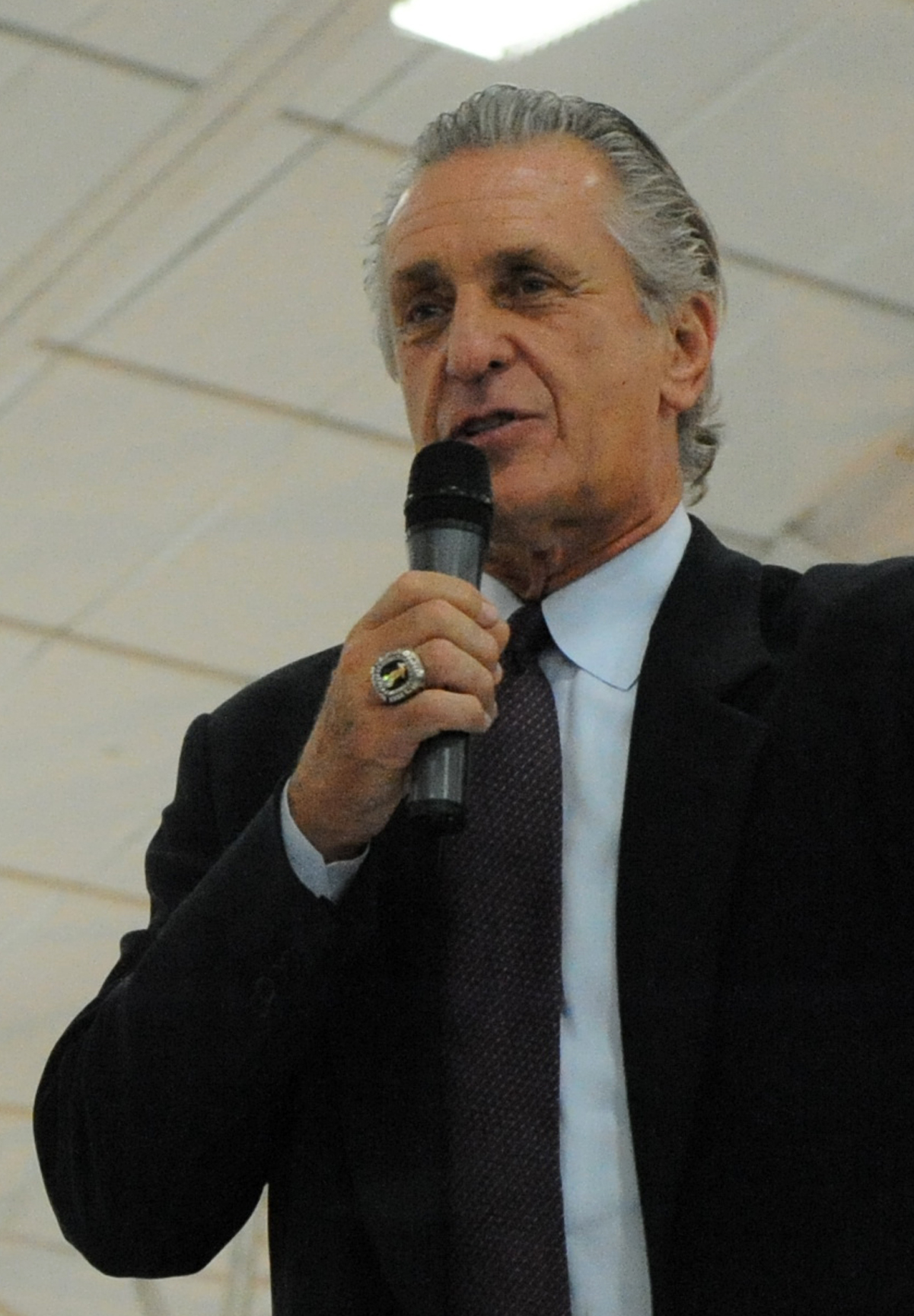
Pat Riley, Kentucky, 1966

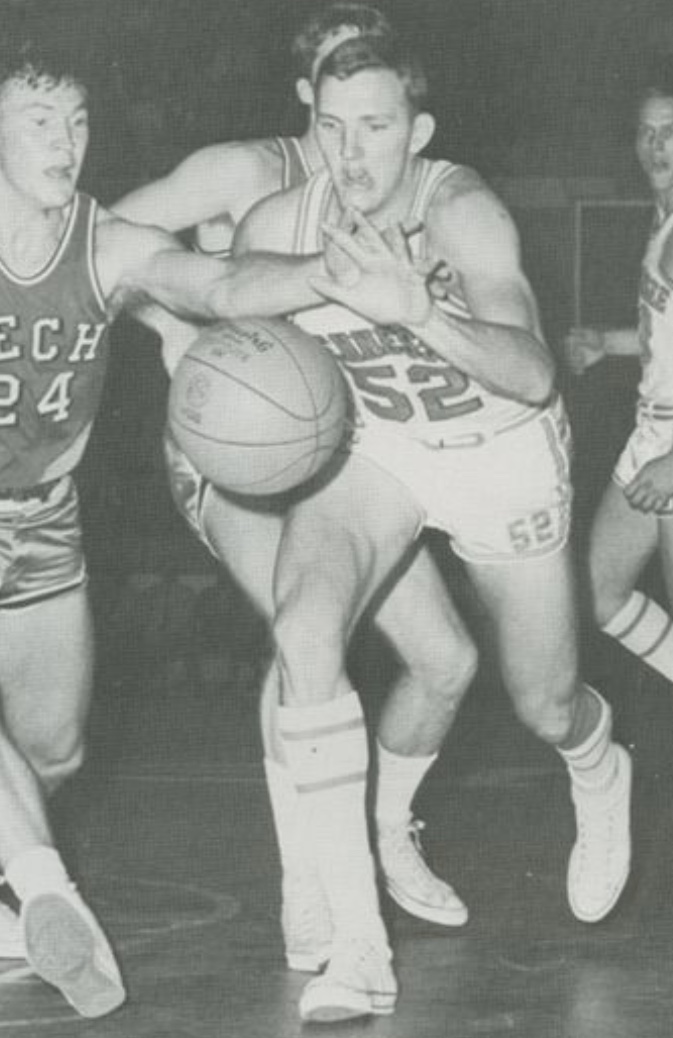
Ron Widby, Tennessee, 1967

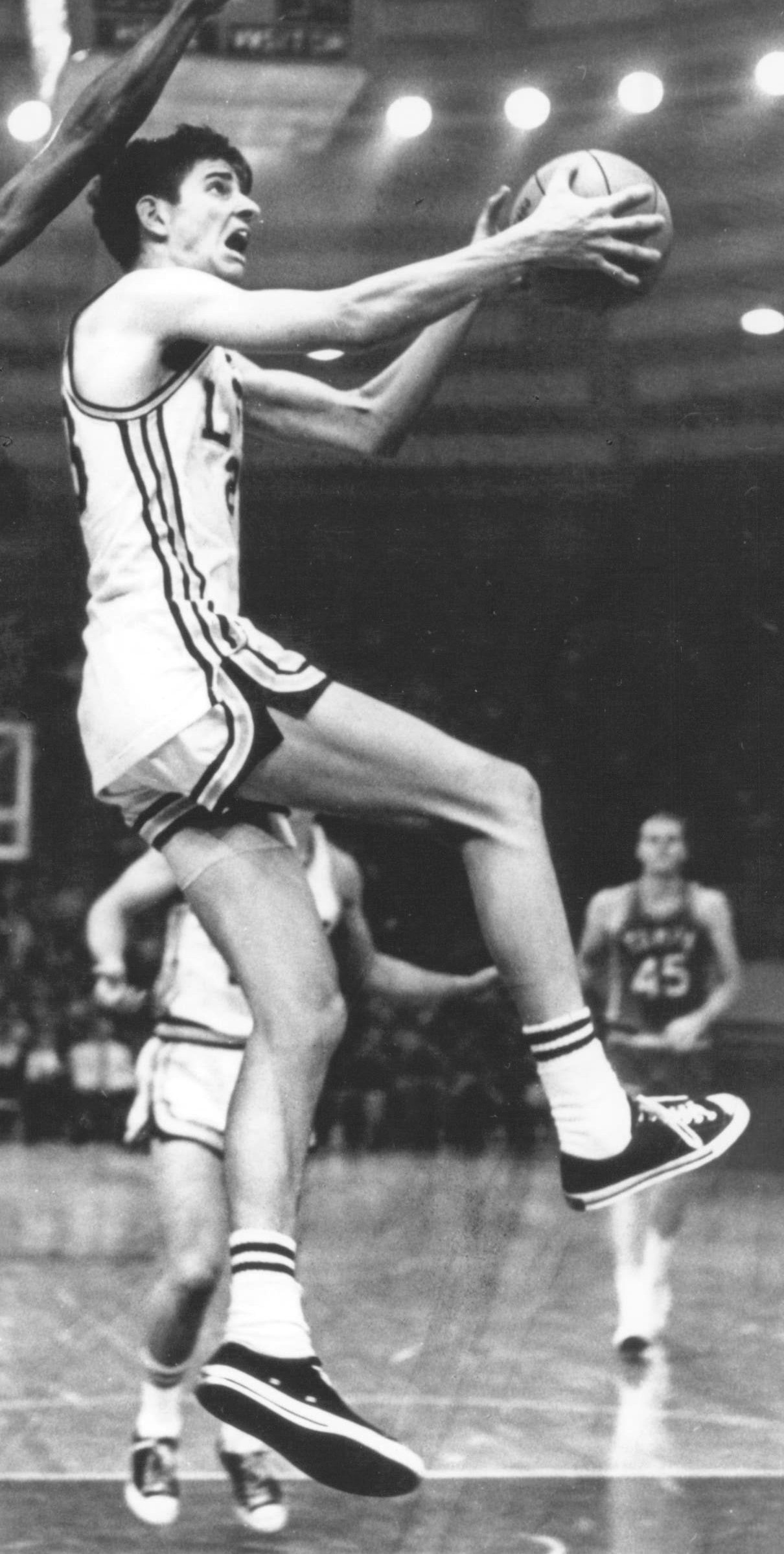
Pete Maravich, LSU, 1968 through 1970

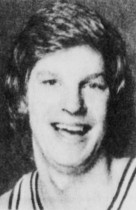
Johnny Neumann, Ole Miss, 1971

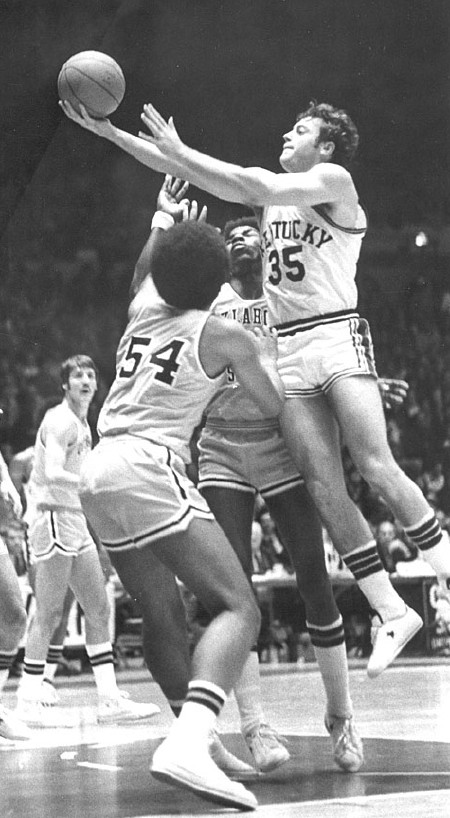
Kevin Grevey, Kentucky, 1973 and 1975

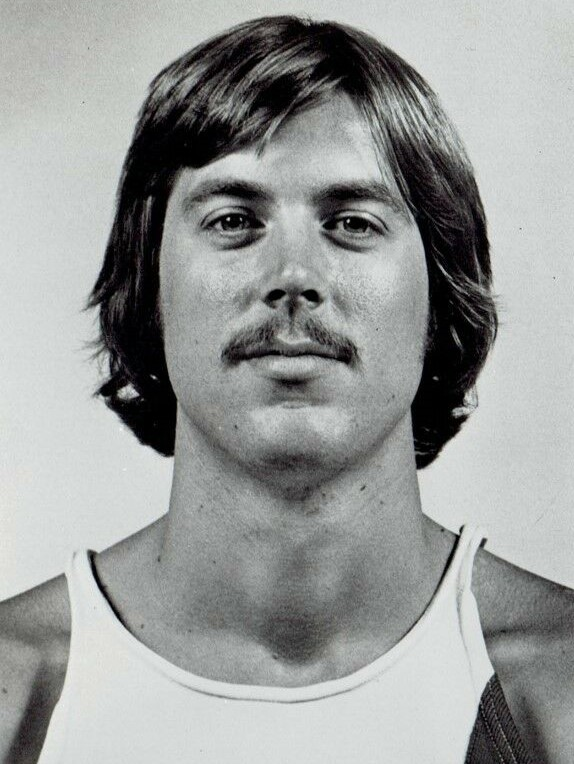
Jan van Breda Kolff, Vanderbilt, 1974

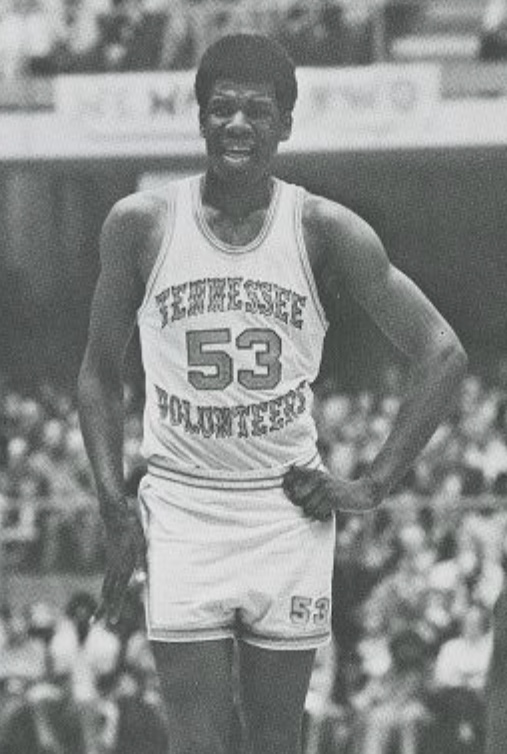
Bernard King, Tennessee, 1975 through 1977

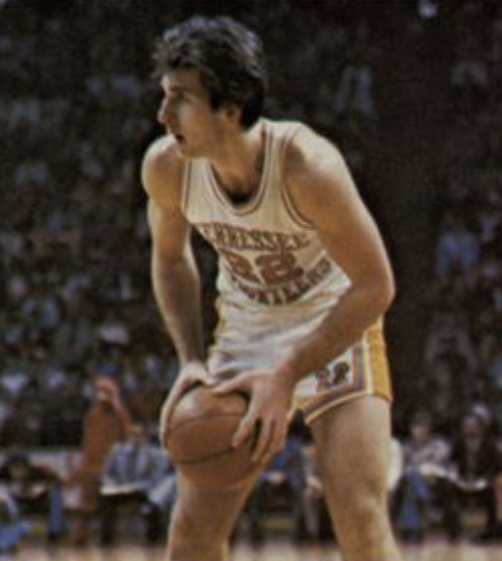
Ernie Grunfeld, Tennessee, 1977

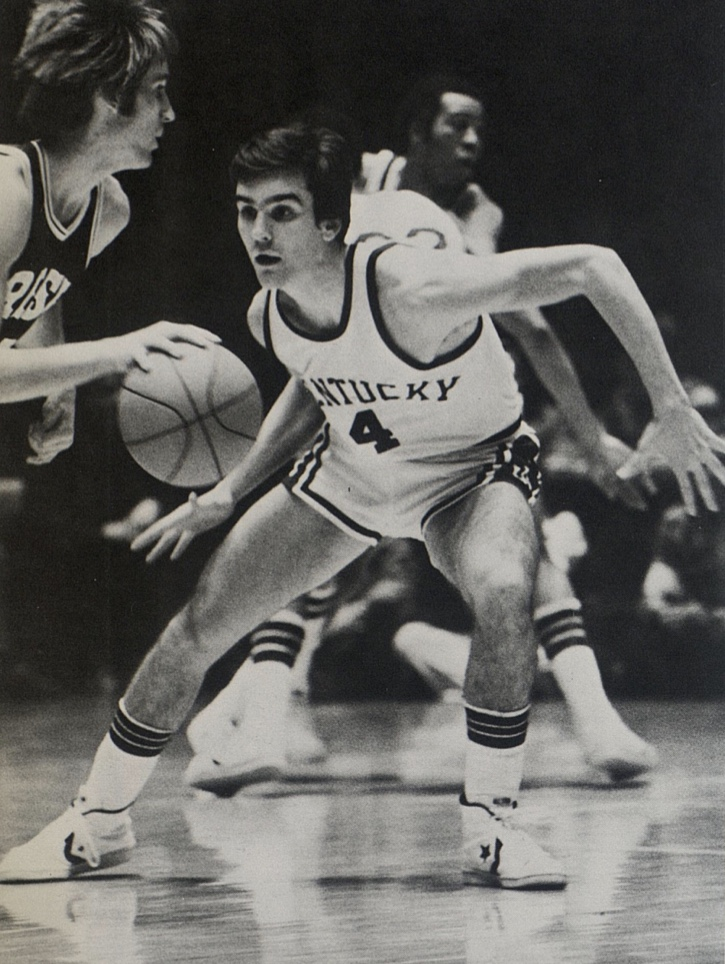
Kyle Macy, Kentucky, 1980

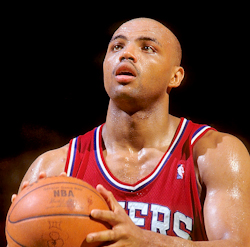
Charles Barkley, Auburn, 1984

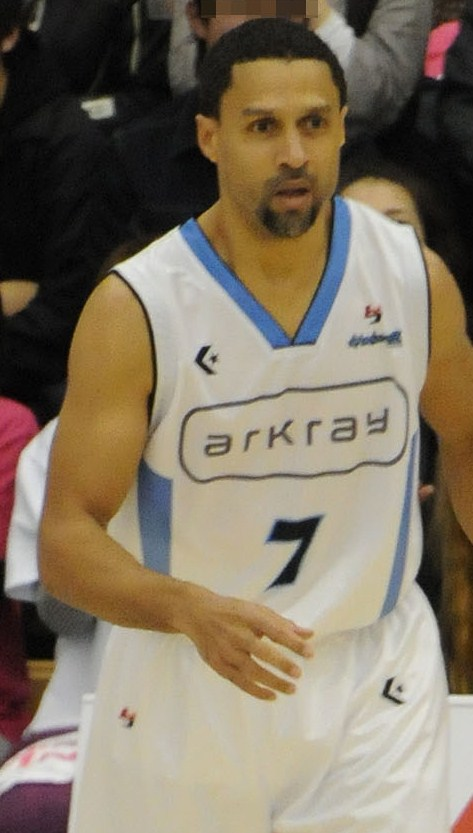
Chris Jackson^{[b]}, LSU, 1989 and 1990

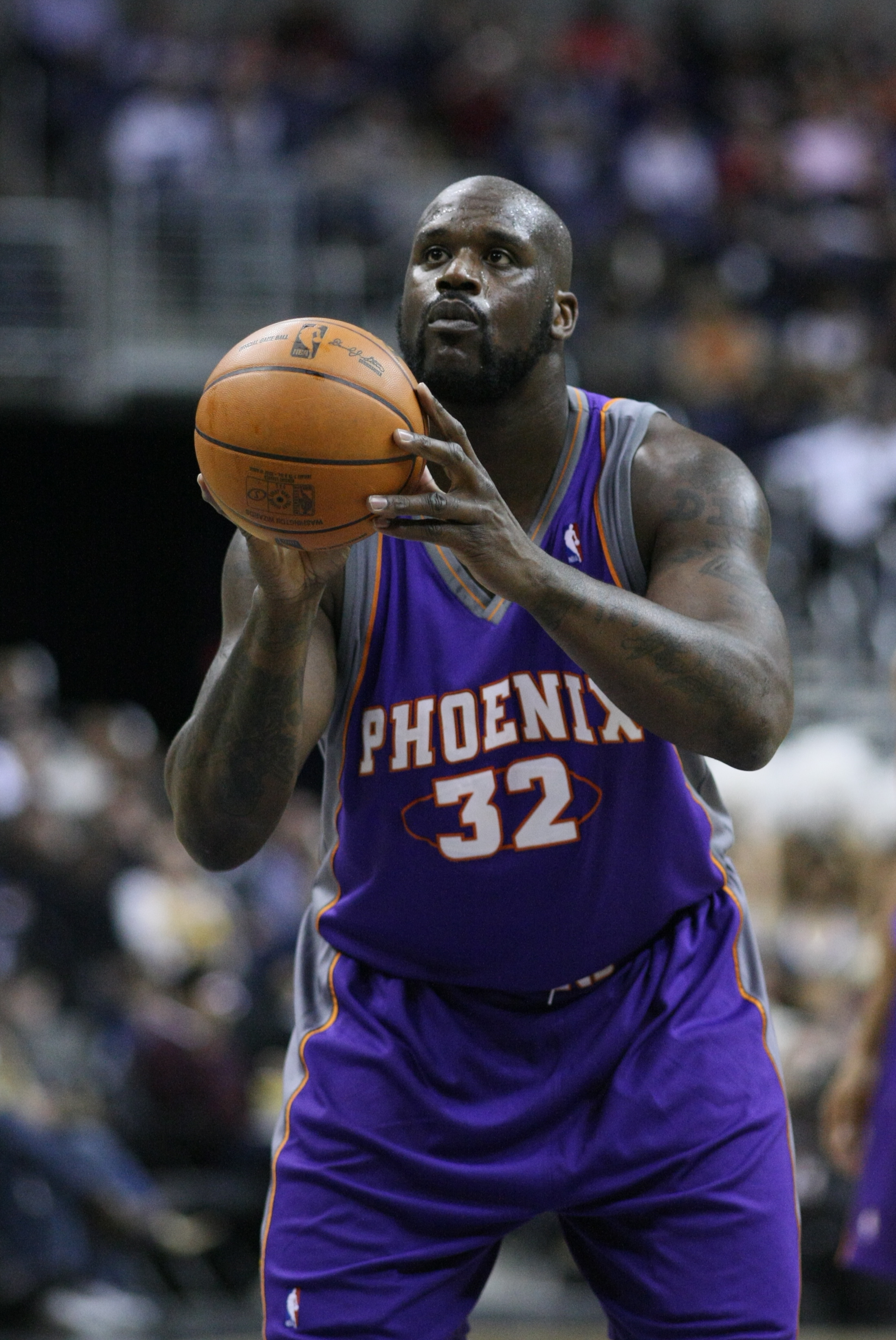
Shaquille O'Neal, LSU, 1991 and 1992

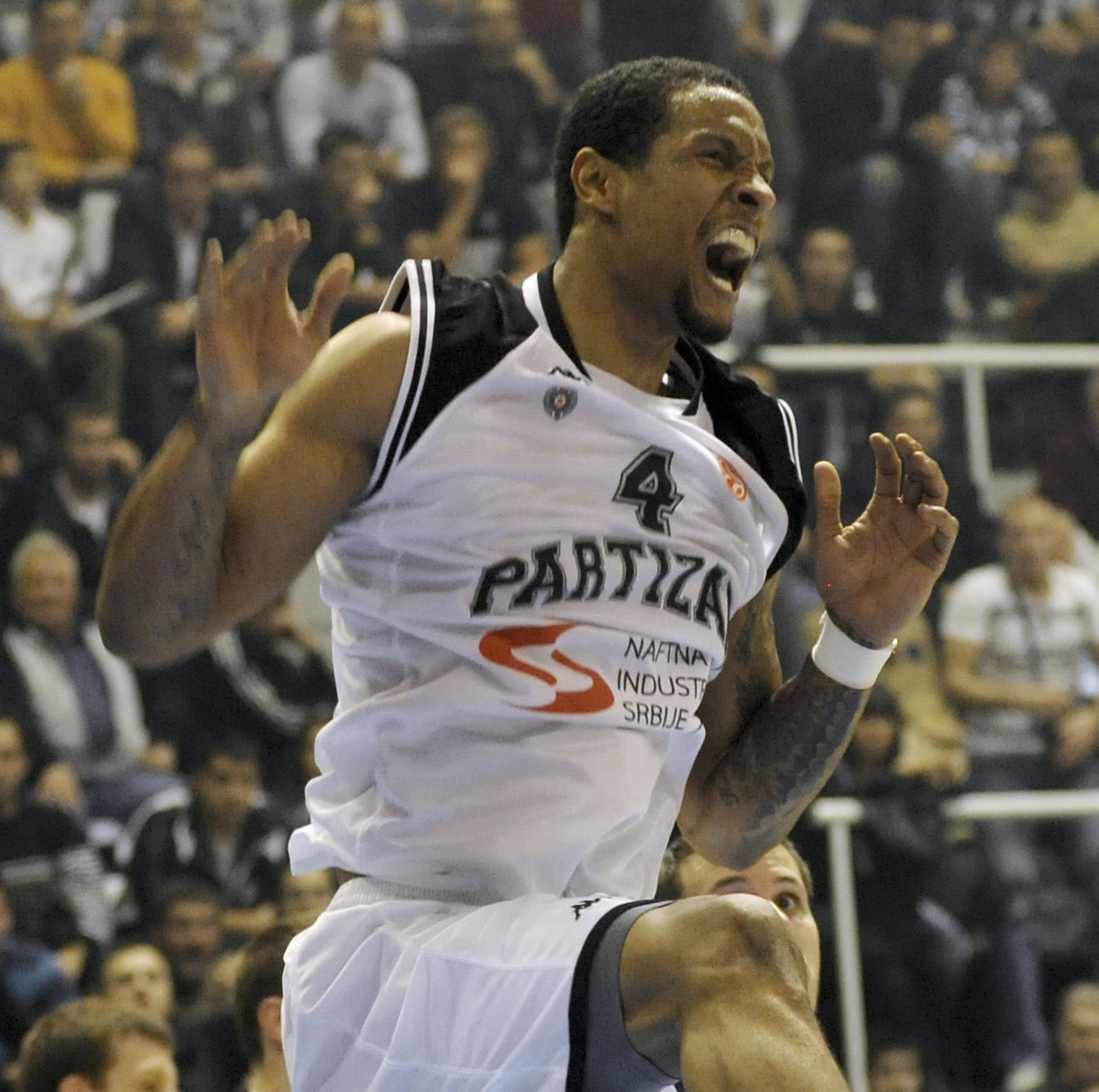
Lawrence Roberts, Mississippi State, 2004

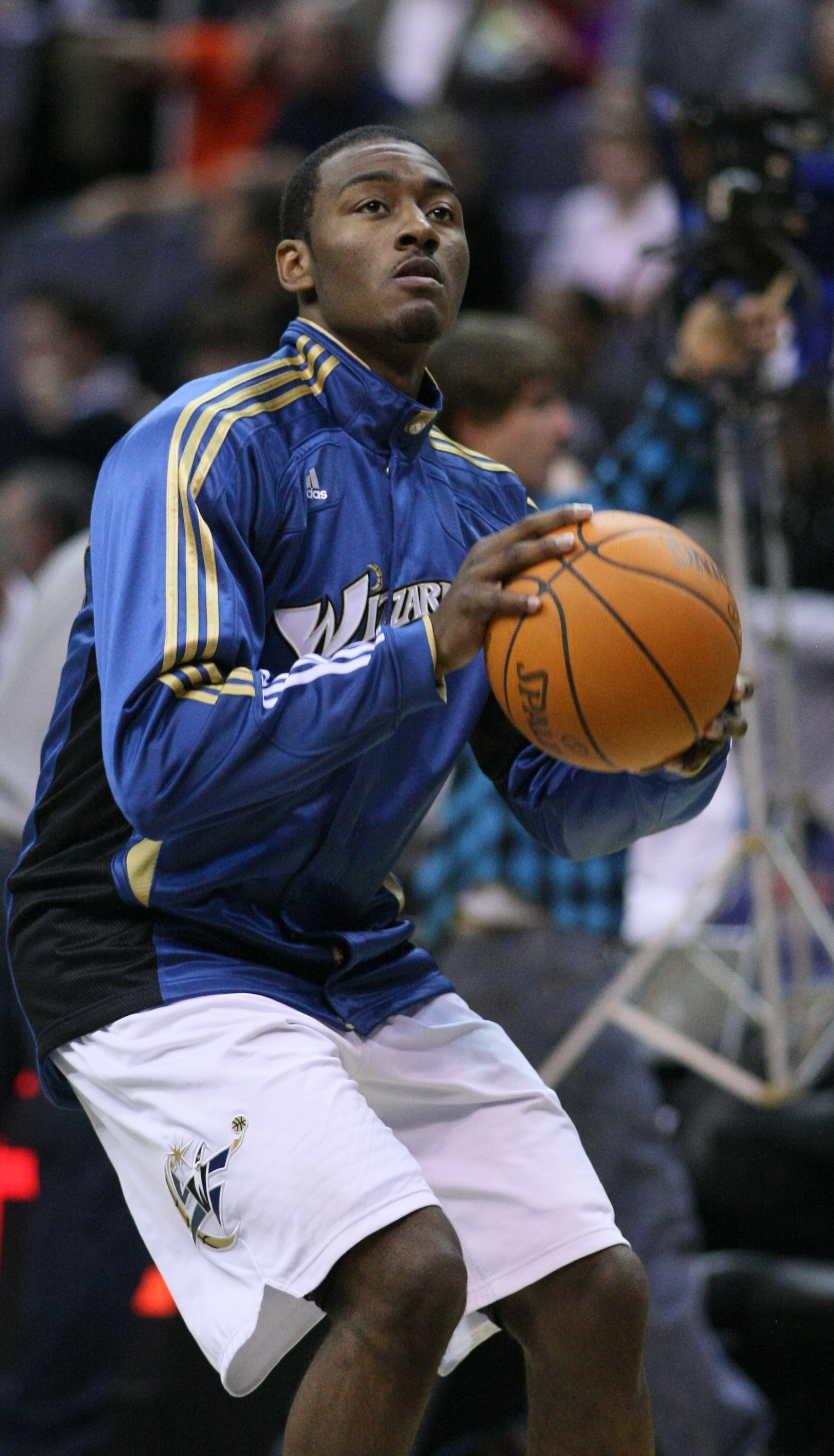
John Wall, Kentucky, 2010

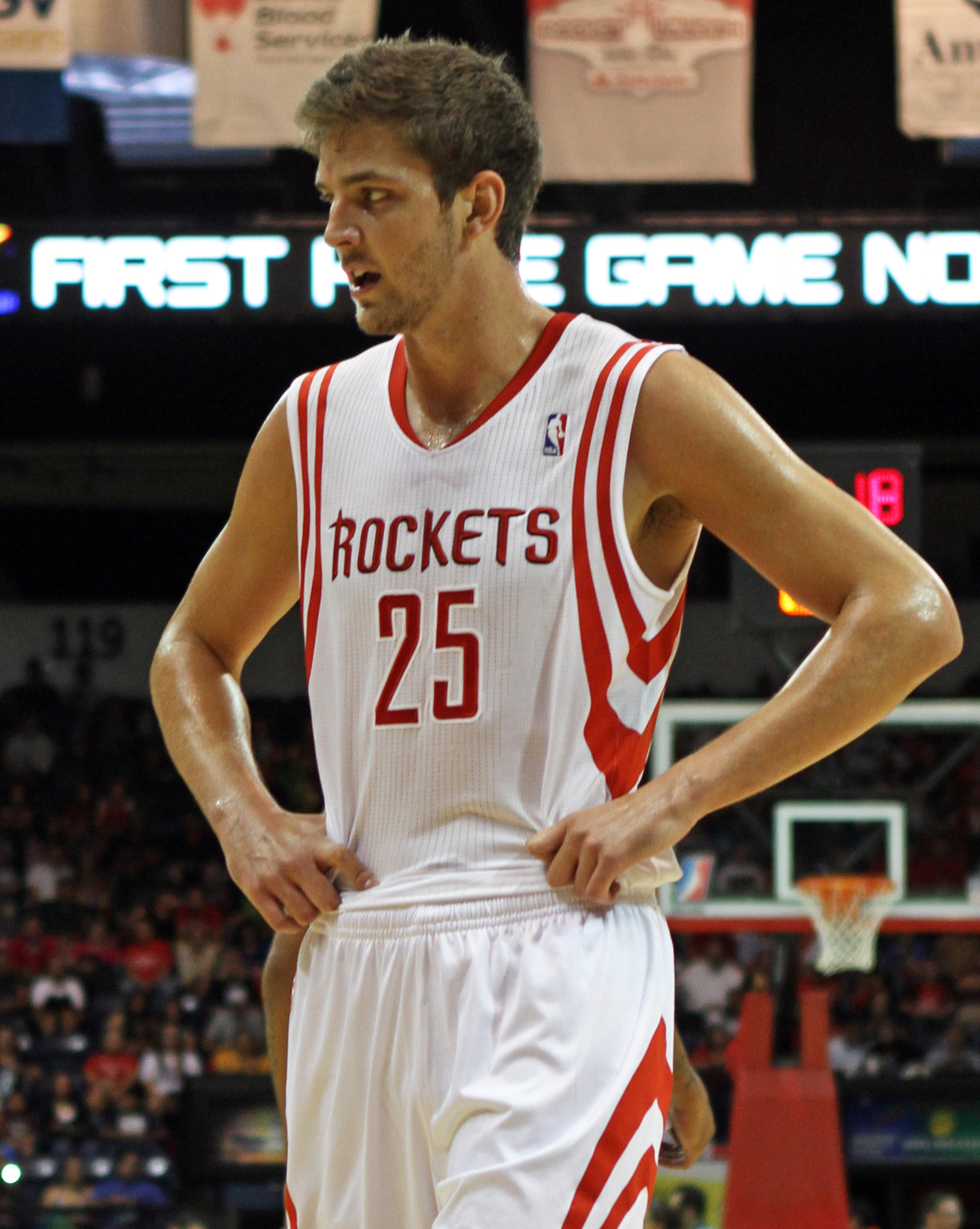
Chandler Parsons, Florida, 2011

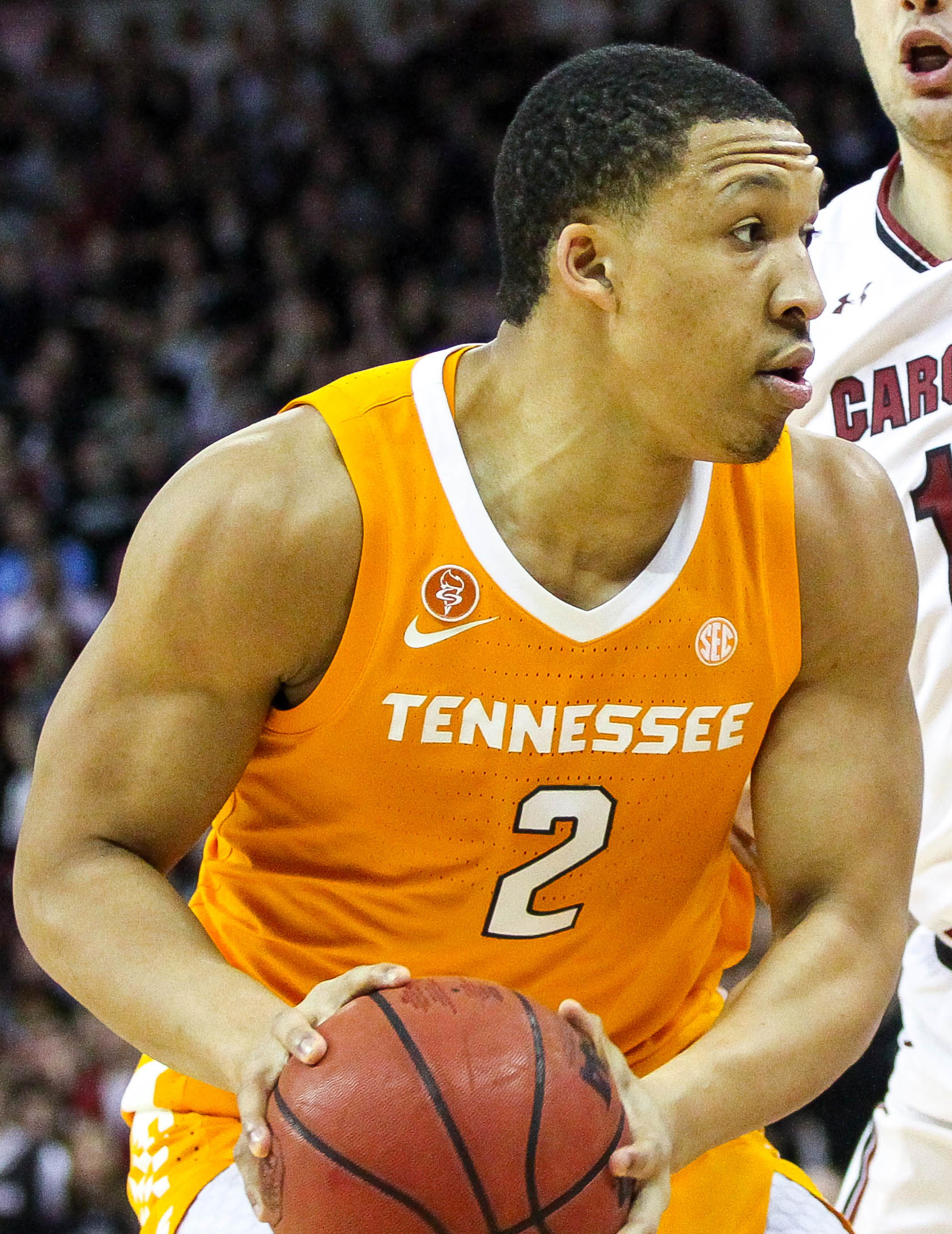
Grant Williams, Tennessee, 2018 and 2019

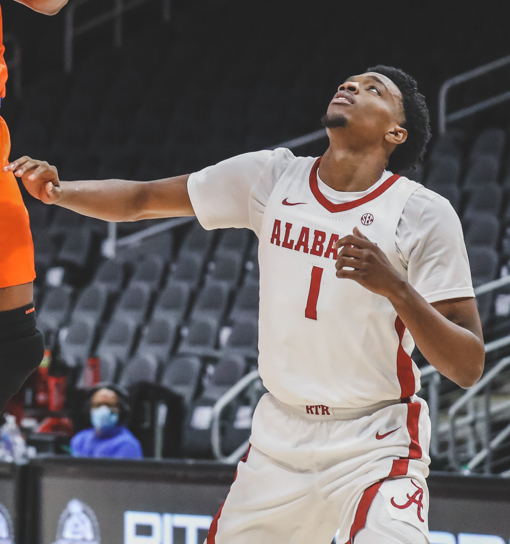
Herbert Jones, Alabama, 2021

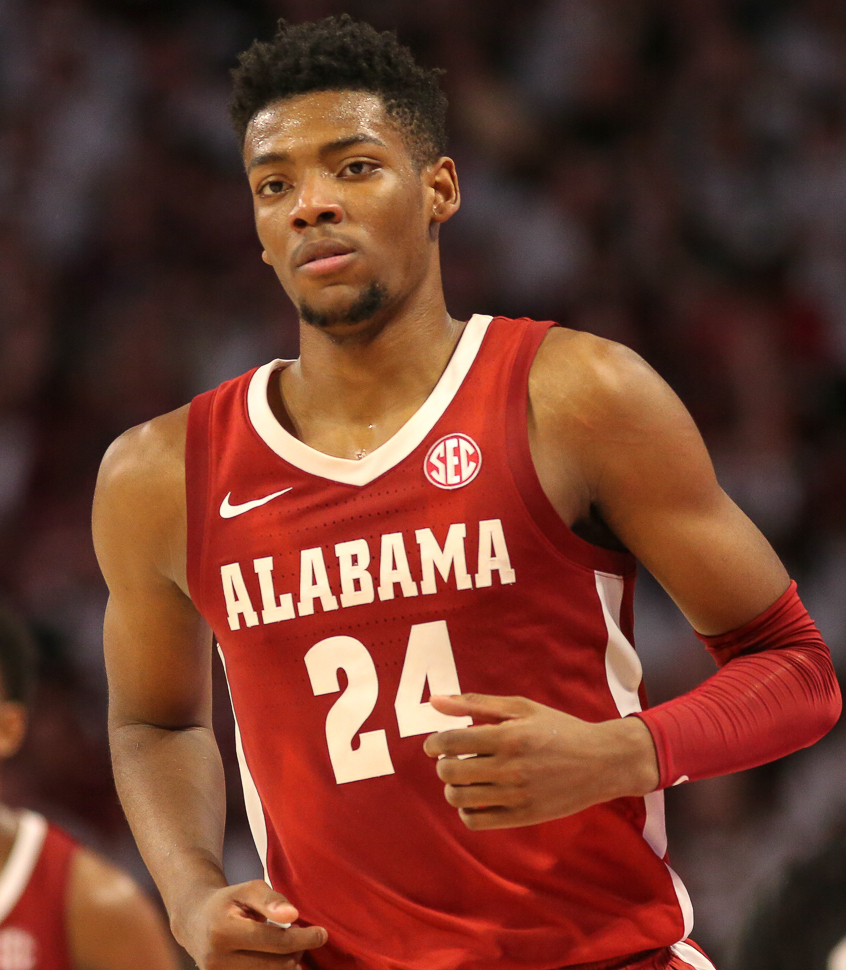
Brandon Miller, Alabama, 2023

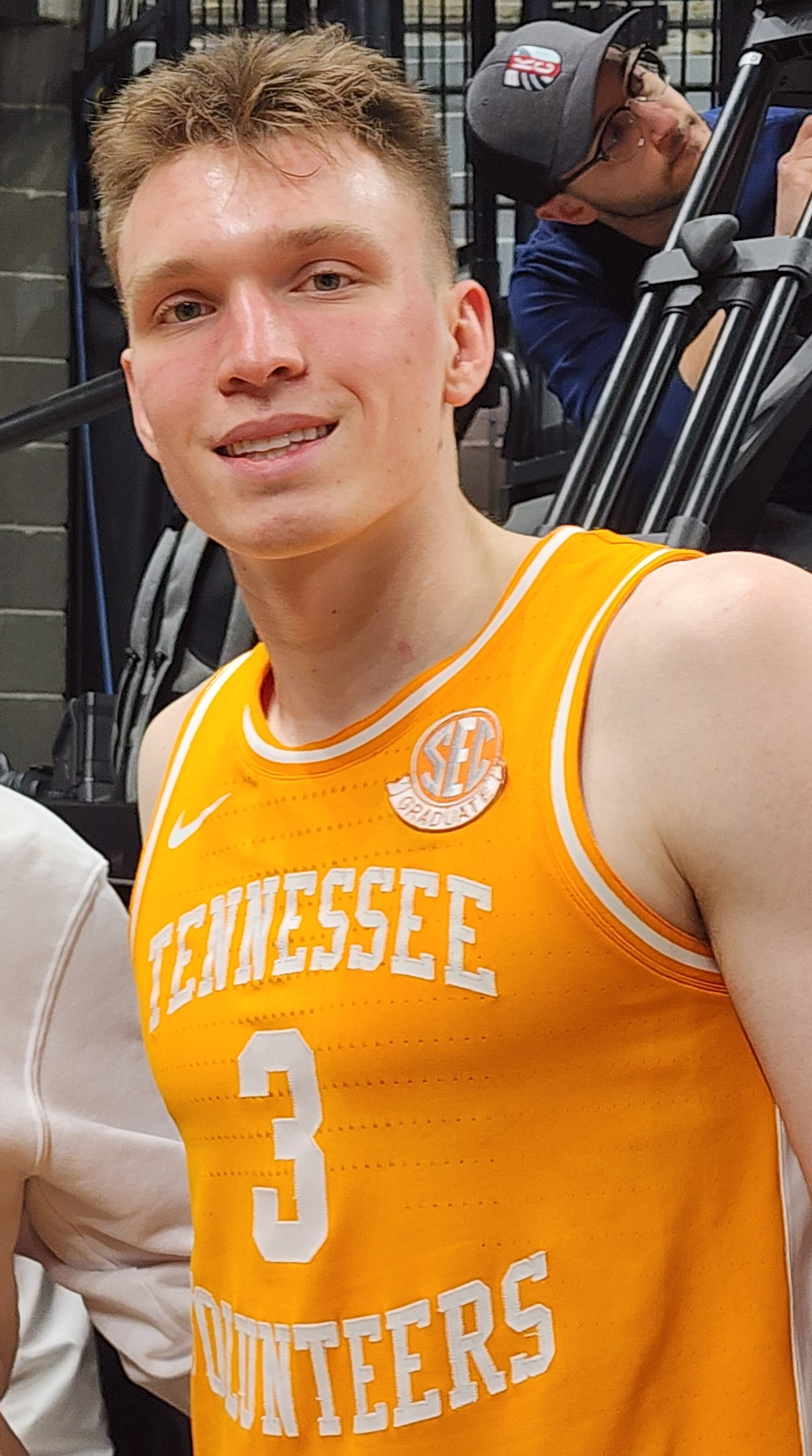
Dalton Knecht, Tennessee, 2024

Season	Player^{[a]}	School	Position	Class	Reference
1964–65	Clyde Lee	Vanderbilt	C / PF	Junior	
1965–66^{†}	Clyde Lee^{U} (2)	Vanderbilt	C / PF	Senior	
1965–66^{†}	Pat Riley^{A}	Kentucky	SG / SF	Junior	
1966–67	Ron Widby	Tennessee	SF	Senior	
1967–68	Pete Maravich	LSU	PG	Sophomore	
1968–69	Pete Maravich* (2)	LSU	PG	Junior	
1969–70	Pete Maravich* (3)	LSU	PG	Senior	
1970–71	Johnny Neumann	Ole Miss	SG / SF	Sophomore	
1971–72^{†}	Mike Edwards^{U}	Tennessee	SG	Junior	
1971–72^{†}	Tom Parker^{A}	Kentucky	PF	Senior	
1972–73^{†}	Kevin Grevey^{A}	Kentucky	SG / SF	Sophomore	
1972–73^{†}	Wendell Hudson^{A, U}	Alabama	SF	Senior	
1973–74	Jan van Breda Kolff	Vanderbilt	SG / SF	Senior	
1974–75^{†}	Kevin Grevey^{A} (2)	Kentucky	SG / SF	Senior	
1974–75^{†}	Bernard King^{U}	Tennessee	SF	Freshman	
1975–76	Bernard King (2)	Tennessee	SF	Sophomore	
1976–77^{†}	Ernie Grunfeld^{A}	Tennessee	SF	Senior	
1976–77^{†}	Bernard King^{A, U} (3)	Tennessee	SF	Junior	
1977–78	Reggie King	Alabama	SF	Junior	
1978–79	Reggie King (2)	Alabama	SF	Senior	
1979–80	Kyle Macy	Kentucky	G	Senior	
1980–81	Rudy Macklin	LSU	SF / SG	Senior	
1981–82	Dale Ellis	Tennessee	SG / SF	Junior	
1982–83^{†}	Dale Ellis^{A} (2)	Tennessee	SG / SF	Senior	
1982–83^{†}	Jeff Malone^{U}	Mississippi State	SG	Senior	
1983–84	Charles Barkley	Auburn	C	Junior	
1984–85	Kenny Walker	Kentucky	PF	Junior	
1985–86	Kenny Walker (2)	Kentucky	PF	Senior	
1986–87^{†}	Derrick McKey^{A, C, U}	Alabama	PF	Junior	
1986–87^{†}	Tony White^{U}	Tennessee	PG	Senior	
1987–88	Will Perdue	Vanderbilt	C	Senior	
1988–89	Chris Jackson^{[b]}	LSU	PG	Freshman	
1989–90	Chris Jackson^{[b]} (2)	LSU	PG	Sophomore	
1990–91	Shaquille O'Neal*	LSU	C	Sophomore	
1991–92	Shaquille O'Neal (2)	LSU	C	Junior	
1992–93^{†}	Billy McCaffrey^{A}	Vanderbilt	SG	Junior	
1992–93^{†}	Jamal Mashburn^{A, C}	Kentucky	SG / SF	Junior	
1993–94	Corliss Williamson	Arkansas	PF	Sophomore	
1994–95	Corliss Williamson (2)	Arkansas	PF	Junior	
1995–96	Tony Delk	Kentucky	PG	Senior	
1996–97	Ron Mercer	Kentucky	SF / SG	Sophomore	
1997–98	Ansu Sesay	Ole Miss	PF	Senior	
1998–99	Chris Porter	Auburn	SF / PF	Junior	
1999–00^{†}	Dan Langhi^{A, C}	Vanderbilt	SF	Senior	
1999–00^{†}	Stromile Swift^{A}	LSU	C	Sophomore	
2000–01	Tayshaun Prince	Kentucky	SF	Junior	
2001–02	Erwin Dudley	Alabama	PF / C	Junior	
2002–03^{†}	Keith Bogans^{C}	Kentucky	SG	Senior	
2002–03^{†}	Ron Slay^{A}	Tennessee	PF	Senior	
2003–04	Lawrence Roberts	Mississippi State	PF	Junior	
2004–05	Brandon Bass	LSU	PF	Sophomore	
2005–06	Glen Davis	LSU	C	Sophomore	
2006–07^{†}	Derrick Byars^{C}	Vanderbilt	SG / SF	Senior	
2006–07^{†}	Chris Lofton^{A}	Tennessee	SG	Junior	
2007–08	Shan Foster	Vanderbilt	SG / SF	Senior	
2008–09	Marcus Thornton	LSU	SG	Senior	
2009–10	John Wall	Kentucky	PG	Freshman	
2010–11	Chandler Parsons	Florida	SF	Senior	
2011–12	Anthony Davis*	Kentucky	C	Freshman	
2012–13	Kentavious Caldwell-Pope	Georgia	SG	Sophomore	
2013–14	Scottie Wilbekin	Florida	PG	Senior	
2014–15	Bobby Portis	Arkansas	PF	Sophomore	
2015–16	Tyler Ulis	Kentucky	PG	Sophomore	
2016–17^{†}	Malik Monk^{A}	Kentucky	SG	Freshman	
2016–17^{†}	Sindarius Thornwell^{C}	South Carolina	SG	Senior	
2017–18^{†}	Yante Maten^{A}	Georgia	PF	Senior	
2017–18^{†}	Grant Williams^{C}	Tennessee	PF	Sophomore	
2018–19	Grant Williams (2)	Tennessee	PF	Junior	
2019–20^{†}	Mason Jones^{A}	Arkansas	SG	Junior	
2019–20^{†}	Reggie Perry^{A}	Mississippi State	PF	Sophomore	
2019–20^{†}	Immanuel Quickley^{C}	Kentucky	SG	Sophomore	
2020–21	Herbert Jones	Alabama	SG / SF	Senior	
2021–22	Oscar Tshiebwe*	Kentucky	C	Junior	
2022–23	Brandon Miller	Alabama	SF	Freshman	
2023–24	Dalton Knecht	Tennessee	SG	Graduate	
2024–25	Johni Broome	Auburn	PF / C	Senior	
2025–26	Darius Acuff Jr.	Arkansas	PG	Freshman	

== Winners by school ==
School (year joined)	Winners	Years
Kentucky (1932)	18	1966^{†}, 1972^{†}, 1973^{†}, 1975^{†}, 1980, 1985, 1986, 1993, 1996, 1997, 2001, 2003^{†}, 2010, 2012, 2016, 2017^{†}, 2020^{†}, 2022
Tennessee (1932)	14	1967, 1972^{†}, 1975^{†}, 1976, 1977 (×2)^{†}, 1982, 1983^{†}, 1987^{†}, 2003^{†}, 2007^{†}, 2018^{†}, 2019, 2024
LSU (1932)	12	1968, 1969, 1970, 1981, 1989, 1990, 1991, 1992, 2000^{†}, 2005, 2006, 2009
Vanderbilt (1932)	8	1965, 1966^{†}, 1974, 1988, 1993^{†}, 2000^{†}, 2007^{†}, 2008
Alabama (1932)	7	1973^{†}, 1978, 1979, 1987^{†}, 2002, 2021, 2023
Arkansas (1991)	5	1994, 1995, 2015, 2020^{†}, 2026
Auburn (1932)	3	1984, 1999, 2025
Mississippi State (1932)	3	1983^{†}, 2004, 2020^{†}
Florida (1932)	2	2011, 2014
Georgia (1932)	2	2013, 2018^{†}
Ole Miss (1932)	2	1971, 1998
South Carolina (1991)	1	2017^{†}
Missouri (2012)	0	—
Oklahoma (2024)	0	—
Texas (2024)	0	—
Texas A&M (2012)	0	—

- ^{a} If no special demarcation indicates which voting body's award the player won that season, then he had earned all of the awards available for that year.
- ^{b} Chris Jackson changed his name to Mahmoud Abdul-Rauf in 1991 after converting to Islam.
