= Bloomfield Hills Schools =

School district in Michigan, United States

Address
- 7273 Wing Lake Road Bloomfield Hills, Oakland County, Michigan, 48301; United States

District information
- Grades: PreKindergarten–12
- Superintendent: Rick West
- Asst. superintendent(s): Todd Bidlak (Learning Services); Joe Duda (Human Resources); Kandice Moynihan (Business Services)
- Schools: 10
- Budget: $202,640,000 2022–2023 expenditures
- NCES District ID: 2606090

Students and staff
- Students: 4,967 (2024–2025)
- Teachers: 424.6 (on an FTE basis) (2024–2025)
- Staff: 998.32 FTE (2024–2025)
- Student–teacher ratio: 11.7 (2024–2025)
- Athletic conference: Oakland Activities Association (Oakland County, MI)
- District mascot: Black Hawks

Other information
- Website: www.bloomfield.org

Bloomfield Hills Schools is a public school district in Metro Detroit in the U.S. state of Michigan, serving most of Bloomfield Hills and Bloomfield Township, and portions of Troy and West Bloomfield.

== History ==
=== 1800 to 1950 ===
By the early 20th Century, several small, independent school districts existed within the present district's boundaries, such as Bloomfield Centre, Gilbert Lake, Hickory Grove, Lincoln, Tuscarora, and Wing Lake. Many of these districts consolidated between 1946 and 1948, the most recent consolidation being Hickory Grove in 1957, forming the present district.

The 1857 Wing Lake School still exists, now attached to the Wing Lake Developmental Center. Another of the early schoolhouses was Tuscarora School at Square Lake and Telegraph Roads. This district was organized in 1837, and consolidated with what would become Bloomfield Hills Schools in 1946. Its white stucco 1917 schoolhouse is still extant, although it closed as a school in 1950, and is currently part of an office building.

The Bloomfield Centre District (Bloomfield Township District No. 2), whose school was known as Circle School, was located near Woodward and Long Lake Roads. In 1932, Circle School was replaced with Vaughan Road School, which contained the first Bloomfield Hills High School. Originally only going to grade ten, by 1936, the school went to grade twelve and the first class graduated that year. It was open to students from outside of the district via application. Matilda Dodge Wilson's children attended from Rochester, indicating the prestige of the school.

=== 1950 to present ===
A new high school was built around 1955. The former high school on Vaughn Road became an elementary school before closing at the end of the 1978-1979 school year. Ultimately, it became part of Cranbrook Schools.

Hickory Grove Elementary was built in 1957 on Lahser Road north of the current site of North Hills Middle School, replacing an older school nearby. It was part of its own independent school district before consolidation with Bloomfield Hills Schools later that year. It closed in 2009, along with Pine Lake Elementary, and was later demolished.

Bloomfield Hills Junior High also opened in 1957. East Hills Junior High was built in 1962. Both were award-winning designs by architects Tarapata-MacMahon and Associates. A third junior high school, West Hills, opened in fall 1967.

Traub Elementary, home to International Academy's Okma Campus since 1996, opened in fall 1965 on agricultural land near what would become the Bowers School Farm. It was expanded in 1967 and 1971. It closed as an elementary school in 1981.

The Eugene L. Johnson Nature Center, named for the district superintendent retiring at the time, was established in 1970. Its 32-acres of woods is used in the district curriculum and is occasionally open to the community.

A second high school, Lahser, opened in 1967, and Bloomfield Hills High School was renamed Andover High School. In fall 2013, the high schools merged, forming Bloomfield Hills High School, initially housed temporarily at the Lahser site while the former Andover High underwent a $59 million reconstruction. The high school reopened at its permanent site on the Andover campus in fall 2015.

In fall 2023, the school year began with several changes to district facilities. The former Lahser High School became North Hills Middle School after undergoing a renovation and expansion. Bloomfield Hills Middle School was renovated and renamed South Hills Middle School. Eastover and Lone Pine Elementary Schools moved to the former middle schools (East Hills and West Hills Middle Schools, respectively). The former Lone Pine Elementary became Bloomin' West preschool. In fall 2024, Eastover Elementary moved to the former East Hills Middle School, and its former building became Bloomin' East preschool. That program had been located in Fox Hills Center, a former elementary school that was torn down.

== Schools and programs ==
Schools in Bloomfield Hills Schools district
School	Address	Notes
Bloomfield Hills High School	4200 Andover Road, Bloomfield Township	Grades 9–12. Formerly Andover High School. Built 1955, renovated and expanded 2015.
North Hills Middle School	3456 Lahser Road, Bloomfield Hills	Grades 6-8. Formerly Lahser High School. Built 1967, renovated and expanded 2023.
South Hills Middle School	4200 Quarton Road, Bloomfield Hills	Grades 6-8. Formerly Bloomfield Hills Junior High/Middle School. Built 1957, renovated and expanded 2023.
Conant Elementary	4100 Quarton Road, Bloomfield Hills	Grades K-5. Opened fall 1960.
Eastover Elementary	2800 Kensington Road, Bloomfield Hills	Grades K-5. Formerly East Hills Middle School.
Lone Pine Elementary	2601 Lone Pine Road, West Bloomfield Township	Grades K-5. Formerly West Hills Middle School. Built 1967.
Way Elementary	765 West Long Lake Road, Bloomfield Hills	Grades K-5. Built 1967.
Bloomin' East	1101 Westview, Bloomfield Hills	Preschool. Formerly Eastover Elementary.
Bloomin' West	3100 Lone Pine Road, West Bloomfield Township	Preschool. Formerly Lone Pine Elementary.
Wing Lake Developmental Center	6490 Wing Lake Road, Bloomfield Hills	Special needs school. Grades PreK-12
Charles L. Bowers School Farm	1219 East Square Lake Road, Bloomfield Hills	Agricultural and environmental education
Model High School	4200 Andover Road, Bloomfield Hills	Alternative high school housed at Bloomfield Hills High School. Grades 10-12
International Academy Okma Campus	1020 East Square Lake Road, Bloomfield Hills	Application-based, International Baccalaureate high school open to students in ten area school districts. Formerly Traub Elementary, built 1965.
P.R.E.P. Program	7273 Wing Lake Road, Bloomfield Hills	Post-secondary transition program for students with disabilities. Formerly Booth Elementary.
Deaf/Hard of Hearing Program	7273 Wing Lake Road, Bloomfield Hills	Program open to Deaf students from across Oakland County. Shares a building with P.R.E.P. Program at former Booth Elementary.
Johnson Nature Center	3325 Franklin Road, Bloomfield Hills	Nature education
