= Berkley School District =

School district in Michigan

Location
- 14501 Talbot Street; Oak Park, MI 48237 United States

District information
- Type: Public school district
- Grades: Infant-Preschool, K-12, ATP(ages 18-26)
- Established: 1918 (as a graded school district)
- Superintendent: Scott Francis
- Asst. superintendent(s): Megan Ashkanai (Assistant Superintendent of Teaching, Learning & Technology); Chris Sandoval (Schools & Human Resources)
- Budget: $86,680,000 (2022-2023 expenditures
- NCES District ID: 2605010

Students and staff
- Students: 3,959 (2024-2025)
- Teachers: 279.93 FTE (2024-2025)
- Staff: 590.27 FTE (2024-2025)
- Student–teacher ratio: 14.14 (2024-2025)
- Athletic conference: Oakland Activities Association (Oakland County, MI)

Other information
- Website: berkleyschools.org

The Berkley School District (branded as Berkley Schools) is a public school district in Metro Detroit in the U.S. state of Michigan, serving Berkley, Huntington Woods, and a portion of Oak Park.

== History ==
In 1840, the Blackmon School was the first school established in Berkley. It was built at Coolidge and Catalpa and its school district was called Royal Oak Township School District #7. It was the only school in the city until South School was built at Eleven Mile Road and Coolidge in 1901.

1918 saw the district's transition to a modern graded school district. Berkley Elementary was built in 1919, and in 1926, a high school section was added to it. By 1930, Angell, Burton, and Pattengill Elementaries had been built. The present high school opened in 1949.

Except Angell Elementary and the former Tyndall Elementary, all school buildings in the district were originally designed by architect Earl G. Meyer. Burton Elementary and Pattengill Elementary were designed by his predecessor architectural firm Lane, Davenport, and Meyer. Angell Elementary was designed in 1924 by architecture firm Smith, Hinchman and Grylls, with later additions by Meyer.

In December 1965, Tyndall Elementary opened. In the 1966-67 school year, the district's enrollment reached a peak of about 9,000 students. The Loren A. Disbrow Physical Education Complex opened at the high school in 1976, paid for by a 1973 bond issue. It included a pool and a 2,400 seat gym. But by 1977, enrollment had fallen to less than 6,300, and Tyndall Elementary was closed in June of that year and converted to a community education center. When enrollment continued to decline, Berkley Elementary was closed in summer of 1978.

Berkley Elementary was torn down, but its one-story addition, known as the Annex, remained. It housed the maintenance department and Berkley Community Access television station, WBRK.

Due to declining enrollment, Avery and Norup student populations were modified in 2002. Avery became PreK-2 and Norup became grades 3-8. Further decline resulted in the combination of Avery and Norup students of at the Norup building in 2006, making Norup the first K-8 IB school in Oakland County. The former Avery building was modified to house Berkley Building Blocks and BSD administrative offices, and was converted to entirely childcare in 2018.

In 2024, Berkley Schools purchased the church at 2119 Catalpa, next to the high school. The building is being renovated for the robotics program and adult transitions program, with completion planned for fall 2025. The Annex is planned to be demolished and a football practice facility called the BEAR Complex will be built in its place.

== Schools ==
School	Address	Notes
High schools
Berkley High School	2325 Catalpa Drive, Berkley	Opened 1949
Middle schools
Anderson Middle School	3205 Catalpa, Berkley	Opened 1956
K-8 schools
Norup International School	14450 Manhattan St, Oak Park	International Baccalaureate school; formerly Norup Middle School, opened 1957, became International in 2006.
Elementary schools
Angell Elementary School	3849 Beverly, Berkley	Opened 1921
Burton Elementary School	26315 Scotia, Huntington Woods	Opened 1925
Pattengill Elementary School	3540 Morrison Ave, Berkley	Opened 1925
Rogers Elementary School	2265 Hamilton, Berkley	Formerly Hamilton Elementary, opened 1955
Preschool
Berkley Building Blocks	14700 W. Lincoln, Oak Park	Formerly Tyler/Avery Elementary, opened 1951
Other facilities
Administrative Offices	14501 Talbot, Oak Park	Formerly Tyndall Elementary, built 1965.
The BEAR Complex		The Berkley Education, Athletics and Recreation Complex will be built across the street from the high school. It is planned to open in October 2026.
The Den	2119 Catalpa, Berkley	Will house adult transition program and robotics program beginning in fall 2025.

=== Former schools ===
School	Notes
Blackmon School	Opened 1840, closed 1901. Sold to a local resident after South School opened.
South School	Opened 1901, converted to a dormitory for teachers in 1920 due to the opening of Angell School.
Temporary Berkley School	Unknown name. Opened 1918, sold to Berkley Community Church and razed after Berkley School opened.
Berkley School	Later called Berkley Elementary, built in 1919 and closed and demolished in 1979. Parts of the school saved from demolition now serve as the district maintenance shop and the headquarters for Berkley Robotics.
Oxford Elementary	Later Oxford Center, opened 1951, closed to students in 1983, served as district administration offices until 2006. Demolished 2007, currently the site of housing and Oxford Park, purchased by the city in 2014.
Charles L. Avery Elementary School/Tyler Elementary/Early Childhood Center	Opened 1951 as Tyler Elementary, converted to grades PreK-2 in 2002, became preschool & admin offices in 2006, converted to full childhood center in 2018. Now Berkley Building Blocks.
John C. Norup Middle School	Opened 1957, became grades 3-8 in 2002, converted to K-8 IB school in 2006. Now Norup International School.
Tyndall Elementary	Opened 1965, closed 1977, became community education building, early childhood center. Became district administration building in 2019.
