= Divino Niño (band) =

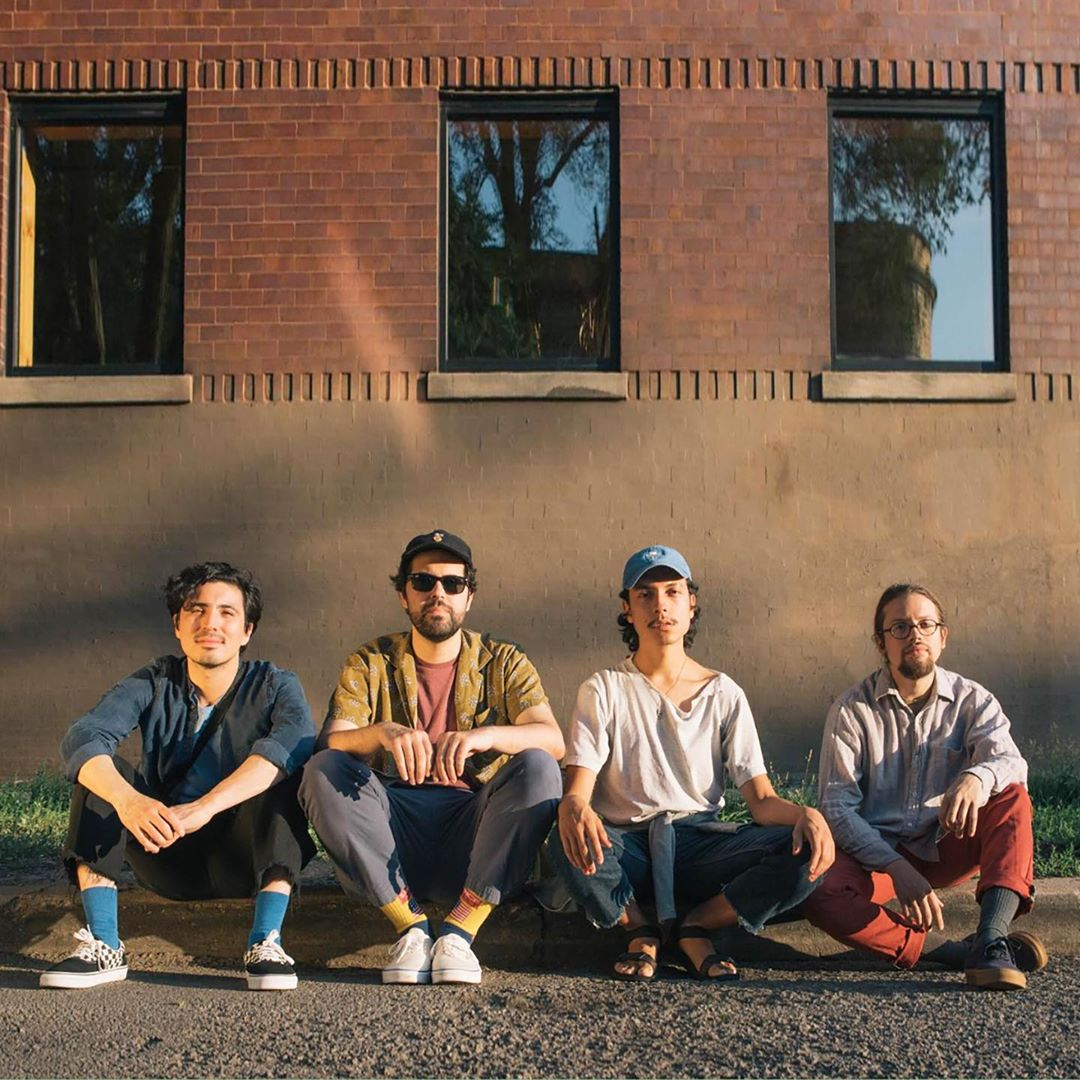
- Divino Niño in 2019

Background information
- Genres: Dream-Pop
- Years active: 2013-present
- Label: Winspear
- Members: Camilo Medina Javier Forero Guillermo Rodriguez-Torres Pierce Codina Justin Vittori (JV)
- Website: divinoninoband.com

Divino Niño is an American-Colombian rock band based in Chicago, Illinois, formed in 2013. The band consists of Camilo Medina (vocals, guitar), Javier Forero (vocals, bass), Guillermo Rodriguez-Torres (guitar, vocals), and Pierce Codina (drums, percussion). Their music has been characterized as surreal, psychedelic, dream-pop and part of the growing Latino music scene.

== History ==
Medina and Forero were childhood friends in Bogotá, Colombia. After both their families moved to Miami, the two reconnected during middle school and began performing together at a local church. The two made their way to Chicago for college where they discovered The Beatles, The Beach Boys, Lovin' Spoonful—popular rock bands of the '60s and '70s. After meeting Guillermo Rodriguez-Torres and Pierce Codina, Divino Niño was officially formed in 2013. In 2020, Justin Vittori (JV) joined the group after being on the road with the band for all of 2019.

== Musical style ==
The group is characterized by their bi-lingual lyrics and often genre-bending songs that pay homage to the '60s an '70s. Pitchfork describes their work as a "squiggly, retro-futurist approach [that] borrows freely but selectively from among a vast pop-rock songbook, the psychedelic explorations of the past, and more recent internet subgenres."

WBEZ said of their debut album Foam "Their sound brings to mind both sun-drenched beaches and frigid urban alleyways. That musical mix makes perfect sense when you understand the band’s journey from Bogota, Colombia to Miami to Chicago."

During the pandemic of 2020 the band stopped meeting in person for long stretches of time and began exploring sampling and beat making. The writing of Last Spa on Earth became a major departure from their acoustic sound exploring Reggaeton sub-genres, J-Dilla like beats, house, and drum & bass.

== Albums and Discography ==
After two mix tapes, Pool Jealousy and The Shady Sexyfornia Tapes, the group released their debut album Foam on Winspear Records on June 21, 2019. Their full-length debut received a 7.5 from Pitchfork saying that "Their squiggly, retro-futurist approach borrows freely but selectively from among a vast pop-rock songbook, the psychedelic explorations of the past, and more recent internet subgenres. This is a collection of sweet, brightly colored love songs from the mind of an acid enthusiast, woven from a small used record store’s worth of influences."

Discography
Album	Year	Released via
Last Spa on Earth	2022	Winspear
Drive (single)	2021	Winspear
Made up my Mind (single)	2020	Winspear
Foam	2019	Winspear
The Shady Sexyfornia Tapes	2016	Native Sound
Pool Jealousy	2014	Native Sound
