= Dale (place name element) =

A dale is a valley. It was commonly used in northern England and Scotland to denote an open valley as a dale, contrasted with a gill or narrow valley.

== List of places ==
Places where dale is part of the name, but not the entire common name:

=== United Kingdom ===
==== England ====
- Ainsdale, Merseyside
- Allendale, Northumberland
- Allerdale, Cumbria
- Birkdale, Merseyside
- Coalbrookdale, Shropshire
- Derbyshire Dales
  - Darley Dale
  - Glossopdale
  - Lathkill Dale
- Eskdale, Cumbria
- Lonsdale, Lancashire and Cumbria
- Redesdale, Northumberland
- Rochdale, Greater Manchester
- Rossendale, Lancashire
- Skelmersdale, Lancashire
- Yorkshire Dales
  - Airedale
  - Denby Dale
  - Langstrothdale
  - Nidderdale
  - Ribblesdale
  - Teesdale
  - Wensleydale

==== Scotland ====
- Achrimsdale
- Allandale
- Allasdale
- Armadale, Skye
- Armadale, Sutherland
- Annandale (disambiguation)
- Arnisdale
- Attadale
- Bernisdale
- Berriedale
- Borrodale
- Bracadale
- Carradale
- Cleadale
- Clydesdale
- Cromdale
- Eorodale
- Eskdale
- Galmisdale
- Glenborrodale
- Glendale
- Grigadale
- Helmsdale
- Lauderdale
- Laxdale
- Liddesdale
- Moffatdale
- Nithsdale, Scotland
- North Erradale
- Sordale
- South Erradale
- Spinningdale
- Strath Halladale
- Suladale
- Swordale
- Talladale
- Teviotdale
- Torrisdale
- Tweeddale
- West Helmsdale
- Westerdale, Highland
- Weydale

=== United States ===
- Allendale, Michigan
- Allendale, New Jersey
- Annandale, Virginia
- Avondale (disambiguation)
- Bardsdale, California
- Bluffdale, Utah
- Brooktondale, New York
- Carbondale, Illinois
- Cooperdale, Ohio
- Dale City, Virginia
- Farmingdale, New York
- Faunsdale, Alabama
- Forestdale (disambiguation)
- Fultondale, Alabama
- Gardendale (disambiguation)
- Glendale (disambiguation)
- Hartsdale, New York
- Hillsdale, New Jersey
- Hillsdale, Portland, Oregon
- Hinsdale, Illinois
- Irondale (disambiguation)
- Knightdale, North Carolina
- Lauderdale (disambiguation)
- Lindale, Texas
- Mountaindale, Oregon
- North Grosvenordale, Connecticut
- Oakdale, New York
- Oildale, California
- Palmdale (disambiguation)
- Parkdale (disambiguation)
- Parksdale, California
- Pinedale (disambiguation)
- Pleasant Dale, Nebraska
- Riverdale, New York
- Robertsdale, Alabama
- Robbinsdale, Minnesota
- Rockdale, Texas
- Rosedale, New York
- Rosendale, New York
- Roslindale, Massachusetts
- Scarsdale, New York
- Scottdale, Georgia
- Scottdale, Pennsylvania
- Scottsdale, Arizona
- Silverdale, Pennsylvania
- Summerdale (disambiguation)
- Thorndale, Pennsylvania
- Urbandale, Iowa
- Weirsdale, Florida

=== Australia ===
- Evandale, Tasmania
- Scottsdale, Tasmania
- Bairnsdale, Victoria
- Forrestdale, Western Australia
- Jarrahdale, Western Australia
- Bedfordale, Western Australia
- Armadale, Western Australia
- Armidale
- Axedale, Victoria
- Strathdale, Victoria
- Kewdale, Western Australia
- Rosedale, Victoria

=== New Zealand ===
- Avondale, Auckland
- Birkdale, Auckland
- Edendale, Southland region
- Rosedale, Auckland
- Silverdale, Auckland
- Silverdale, Hamilton
- Taradale, Hawke's Bay region

=== Canada ===
- Armdale, Nova Scotia
- Coaldale, Alberta
- Cloverdale, British Columbia
- Nickeldale, Ontario
- Parkdale, Ontario
- Pinedale, Alberta
- Rexdale, Ontario
- Rosedale, Ontario
- Silverdale, British Columbia
- Thorndale, Ontario
- Tisdale, Saskatchewan
- Vegandale, Ontario

=== Multiple regions ===
- Avondale (disambiguation)
- Lawndale (disambiguation)
- Rosedale (disambiguation)

== See also ==
- Dell (landform)
- Dale (disambiguation)
