= Avondale =

Avondale may refer to:

== Communities ==
=== Australia ===
- Avondale, New South Wales, a village in New South Wales
- Avondale, Queensland, a village in Queensland
- Avondale Heights, a suburb in Melbourne, Victoria

=== Canada ===
- Avondale, Newfoundland and Labrador, a town on the Avalon Peninsula
- Avondale, Hants, Nova Scotia, an unincorporated community
- Avondale, Pictou, Nova Scotia, a community

=== United States ===
Listed alphabetically be state

- Avondale (Birmingham), a neighborhood of Birmingham, Alabama
- Avondale, Arizona, a city in Maricopa County, Arizona
- Avondale, Colorado, a census-designated place in Pueblo County, Colorado
- Avondale (Jacksonville), a neighborhood of Jacksonville, Florida
- Avondale, Georgia, an unincorporated community in Bibb County, Georgia
- Avondale (Columbus, Georgia), a neighborhood of Columbus in Muscogee County, Georgia
- Avondale Estates, Georgia, city in DeKalb County, Georgia
- Avondale, Chicago, a community area of Chicago, Illinois
- Avondale, Louisiana, a census-designated place in Jefferson Parish, Louisiana
- Avondale, Maryland, an unincorporated area in Prince George's County, Maryland
- Avondale, Michigan, an unincorporated community in Osceola County, Michigan
- Avondale, Missouri, a city in Clay County, Missouri
- Avondale, Coshocton County, Ohio, a former name of the unincorporated community now known as Fresno, Ohio
- Avondale, Stark County, Ohio, an unincorporated community near Canton, Ohio
- Avondale, Cincinnati, a neighborhood of Cincinnati, Ohio
- Avondale, Pennsylvania, a borough in Chester County, Pennsylvania
- Avondale, Texas, a rural community in Tarrant County, Texas
- Avondale, McDowell County, West Virginia, an unincorporated community in McDowell County, West Virginia

=== Elsewhere ===
- Avondale, Auckland, a suburb of Auckland, New Zealand
- Avondale, Christchurch, a suburb of Christchurch, New Zealand
- Avondale, Harare, a residential suburb in north and northwest Harare, Zimbabwe
- Avondale, South Lanarkshire, a settlement in Strathaven, South Lanarkshire, Scotland, U.K.

== Education ==
- Avondale College, an Australian tertiary education provider
- Avondale College, Auckland, a secondary education provider in New Zealand
- Avondale High School (disambiguation)
- Avondale School (disambiguation)

== Houses ==
- Avondale (Westminster, Maryland), a historic home in Westminster, Maryland, U.S.
- Avondale, Parramatta, a heritage-listed former residence in New South Wales, Australia
- Avondale House, a Georgian house and historic birthplace in County Wicklow, Ireland
- Avondale Plantation Home, a historic plantation house near Clinton, Louisiana, U.S.

== Sports ==
- Avondale FC, an Australian semi-professional football club
- Avondale United, a New Zealand football club now known as Lynn-Avon United AFC
- Avondale United F.C. (Cork), an Irish association football club

== Titles ==
- Duke of Clarence and Avondale, in the Peerage of the United Kingdom
- Earl of Avondale, in Scotland
- Lord Avondale, in Scotland

== Transportation ==
=== Boats and ships ===
- Avondale, a boat launched in 1895 and later renamed Hero
- SS Avondale Park, a Canadian cargo ship sunk by German forces near the end of World War II

=== Stations ===
- Avondale railway station, New Zealand, on the Western Line of the Auckland railway network of New Zealand
- Avondale railway station, Queensland, a closed railway station on the North Coast railway of Australia
- Avondale station (MARTA), a train station in Decatur, Georgia, U.S.

=== Other ===
- Avondale, a regional term for a governess cart
- Avondale Bridge (disambiguation)
- Avondale Shipyard, an independent shipbuilding company in Louisiana, U.S.

== Other uses ==
- Avondale Castle (also known as Strathaven Castle), in South Lanarkshire, Scotland, U.K.
- Avondale Colliery, a former coal mine near Plymouth, Pennsylvania, U.S.
- Avondale Forest, a wooded estate in County Wicklow, Ireland
- Avondale Park, a small park in London England, U.K.
- Avondale Park (Chicago), a park in the Avondale area of Chicago, Illinois

== See also ==
- Avon (disambiguation)
