= Avon =

Avon may refer to:

- River Avon (disambiguation), several rivers

== Organisations ==
- Avon Buses, former bus operating company in Merseyside and Cheshire, England
- Avon Coachworks, a car body builder established in 1919 at Warwick, England, relaunched in 1922 as New Avon
- Avon Inflatables, a British manufacturer of inflatable boats, RIBs and marine safety equipment
- Avon Products, an Anglo-American manufacturer of various cosmetics and personal care products
- Avon (publisher), an imprint of the publisher HarperCollins
- Avon Technologies, formerly Avon Rubber and Avon Protection, a British manufacturer of rubber products
- Avon Tyres, a British car, motorcycle and racing-tyre manufacturer, owned since 1997 by the Cooper Tire & Rubber Company
- Avon and Somerset Police, a police service in the United Kingdom

== People ==
- John Avon (born 1961), Welsh illustrator
- Rex Avon, pseudonym of composer Montague Ewing (1890–1957)
- Avon Cobourne (born 1979), American football running back
- Anthony Eden (1897–1977), British Prime Minister and 1st Earl of Avon
- Avon Honey (1947–2010), American politician from Louisiana
- Avon Long (1910–1984), American singer and actor
- Avon Riley (1958–2020), American football linebacker
- Avon Williams (1921–1993), American politician from Tennessee

=== Fictional characters ===
- Justin Alastair, Duke of Avon in the novel These Old Shades by Georgette Heyer
- Kerr Avon, a character in the science-fiction television series Blake's 7
- Avon Barksdale, a character in the HBO television series The Wire

== Places ==
=== Australia ===
- Electoral district of Avon, a former electorate of the Western Australian Legislative Assembly
- Avon, South Australia, former township between Balaclava and Long Plains

=== Canada ===
- Avon, Ontario
- New Avon, New Brunswick

=== France ===
- Avon, Seine-et-Marne, a city in the département of Seine-et-Marne, part of Communauté de communes de Fontainebleau-Avon
- Avon, Deux-Sèvres, a commune in the département of Deux-Sèvres
- Avon-la-Pèze, a commune in the département of Aube
- Avon-les-Roches, a commune in the département of Indre-et-Loire

=== New Zealand ===
- Avon (New Zealand electorate)

=== United Kingdom ===
- Avon (county), a county of England from 1974 to 1996
- Avon, Hampshire, a hamlet in Sopley parish
- Avon, Wiltshire, a hamlet in Bremhill parish

=== United States ===
- Avon, Alabama
- Avon, Contra Costa County, California
- Avon, Colorado
- Avon, Connecticut
- Avon, Illinois
- Avon, Indiana
- Avon, Iowa
- Avon, Maine
- Avon, Massachusetts
- Avon, Minnesota, a city
- Avon, Mississippi
- Avon, Montana, a town
- Avon (town), New York
  - Avon (village), New York, within the town
- Avon, North Carolina
- Avon, Ohio, a city
- Avon, Pennsylvania, a town
- Avon, South Dakota, a city
- Avon, Utah, a town
- Avon, Wisconsin, a town
- Avon, Rock County, Wisconsin, an unincorporated community
- Avon-by-the-Sea, New Jersey, a borough
- Avon Lake, Ohio, a city
- Avon Park, Florida, a city
- Avon Township (disambiguation)

== Other uses ==
- Avon (ship), a ship built in 1884
- HMS Avon, name given to a number British Royal Navy ships
- "Avon" (song), a song by Queens of the Stone Age
- "Avon 1", a song from the album A Bugged Out Mix by Miss Kittin
- Rolls-Royce Avon, a jet engine

== See also ==
- Afon, the Welsh word for river, often anglicised to 'avon'
- Aberavon
- Aven (disambiguation)
- Avondale (disambiguation)
- Avonmore (disambiguation)
- Craigavon (disambiguation)
- Blaenavon
- Cwmavon (disambiguation)
