= WAHS =

Radio station at Avondale High School in Auburn Hills, Michigan

Coordinates: 42.628°N 83.232°W

- Auburn Hills, Michigan; United States
- Broadcast area
- Frequency: 89.5 MHz
- Branding: Avondale Community Radio

Programming
- Format: Variety; High school station

Ownership
- Owner: Avondale School District

History
- First air date: November 10, 1975
- Call sign meaning: W Avondale High School

Technical information
- Licensing authority: FCC
- Class: A
- ERP: 2400 watts
- HAAT: 54 meters

Links
- Public license information: Public file; LMS
- Website: https://www.wahsradio.org/

WAHS (89.5 FM, "Avondale Community Radio") is a radio station broadcasting a variety format. Licensed to Auburn Hills, Michigan, it first began broadcasting in 1975. The station began with 10 watts of effective radiated power and increased its power to 100 watts ERP in 1982. The station now transmits at 2,400 watts.

The station serves as both a public station and a learning tool for young students attending Avondale High School. In 2016 WAHS expanded programming to feature both locally produced and nationally syndicated programs as well as Avondale sports coverage. They also re-branded their slogan from "The Station for Alteration" to "Avondale Community Radio." In 2017, they received a Michigan Association of Broadcasters award for High School Radio Station of the Year. As of 2021, the station manager is Andrew Grieve and Elizabeth Warner Radio & Television Instructor, GM.
