= Avondale School =

Avondale School can refer to:

== Canada ==
- Avondale Alternative Secondary School in Toronto, Ontario

== Oceania ==
- Avondale College in Auckland, New Zealand
- Avondale School in Cooranbong, Australia
- Avondale University College in New South Wales, Australia

== United Kingdom ==
- Stockport Academy in Cheadle Heath, formerly known as Avondale High School

== United States ==
- Avondale Elementary School District near Phoenix, Arizona
- Avondale High School in Dekalb County, Georgia
- Avondale High School in Auburn Hills, Michigan
- Avondale School District in Michigan
