= Aven =

Aven or AVEN may refer to:

- Aven (river) in Brittany, France
- Pyotr Aven, Russian businessman and politician
- Asexual Visibility and Education Network, an Internet-based community to promote awareness of asexual orientation
- Aven (finance company), a U.S.-based financial technology company

== See also ==
- Avon (disambiguation)
- Avens (disambiguation)
- Pont-Aven, a commune (municipality) in Brittany, France
