= Nick Whiteside =

American football player (born 2000)

No. 38 – Detroit Lions
- Position: Cornerback
- Roster status: Active

Personal information
- Born: May 1, 2000 (age 26); Auburn Hills, Michigan, U.S.
- Listed height: 6 ft 1 in (1.85 m)
- Listed weight: 200 lb (91 kg)

Career information
- High school: Avondale (Auburn Hills)
- College: Saginaw Valley State (2018–2022)
- NFL draft: 2023: undrafted

Career history
- Washington Commanders (2023); St. Louis Battlehawks (2025); Detroit Lions (2025–present)

Awards and highlights
- First-team DII All-American (2022); Second-team DII All-American (2021); GLIAC Defensive Back of the Year (2021); 2x First-team All-GLIAC (2021, 2022)

Career NFL statistics as of Week 10, 2026
- Tackles: 6
- Pass deflections: 3
- Stats at Pro Football Reference

Nick Whiteside II (born May 1, 2000) is an American professional football cornerback for the Detroit Lions of the National Football League (NFL). He played college football for the Saginaw Valley State Cardinals and signed with the Washington Commanders as an undrafted free agent in 2023.

== Early life ==
Whiteside was born on May 1, 2000, in Auburn Hills, Michigan. He attended Avondale High School in Auburn Hills and played three sports: football, basketball and track. He won the OAA Scholar Athlete Award and was chosen to his football conference's all-league team. He committed to play college football for the Saginaw Valley State Cardinals.

== College career ==
As a true freshman at Saginaw Valley State University in 2018, Whiteside played in all 11 games and recorded 15 tackles, four pass breakups and an interception. He then received honorable mention All-Great Lakes Intercollegiate Athletic Conference (GLIAC) honors in 2019 while posting 46 tackles, nine pass breakups and five interceptions in 11 games.

After no season in 2020 due to the COVID-19 pandemic, Whiteside appeared in all 11 games for the Cardinals in 2021 and had 40 tackles, eight pass breakups and four interceptions. He was selected first-team All-GLIAC, the GLIAC Defensive Back of the Year and was selected second-team Division II All-American. Whiteside suffered a torn Achilles tendon at the end of the 2021 season but returned in time for 2022 and appeared in 10 games, recording 30 tackles and two interceptions while repeating as an All-American. However, he suffered a broken foot prior to the final game of the season. He declared for the 2023 NFL draft, finishing his collegiate career with 131 tackles, 26 pass breakups and 12 interceptions in 43 games played.

== Professional career ==
Pre-draft measurables
Height	Weight	Arm length	Hand span	Wingspan	20-yard shuttle	Three-cone drill	Vertical jump	Broad jump	Bench press
6 ft 0 in (1.83 m)	200 lb (91 kg)	32 1/2 in (0.83 m)	9 1/8 in (0.23 m)	6 ft 5 3/4 in (1.97 m)	4.24 s	7.09 s	30.5 in (0.77 m)	9 ft 11 in (3.02 m)	8 reps
All values from Pro Day

=== Washington Commanders ===
Whiteside was signed by the Washington Commanders as an undrafted free agent on May 3, 2023. He was released at the final roster cuts and then re-signed to the practice squad. He was elevated to the active roster for the team's Week 17 game against the San Francisco 49ers and made his NFL debut in the 27–10 loss. He was signed to the active roster on January 5, 2024, and was released on August 27.

=== St. Louis Battlehawks ===
On December 3, 2024, Whiteside signed with the St. Louis Battlehawks of the United Football League (UFL).

=== Detroit Lions ===
On July 28, 2025, Whiteside signed with the Detroit Lions of the National Football League (NFL). He was waived on August 26 as part of final roster cuts. On October 1, Whiteside was re-signed to the practice squad. He was signed to the active roster on October 11. Whiteside was released again on November 25 and was re-signed to the practice squad two days later. On December 4, Whiteside was signed to the active roster. In nine total appearances for Detroit, he recorded three pass deflections and five combined tackles.

On January 5, 2026, the Lions signed Whiteside to a one-year contract extension. On August 30, Whiteside was waived by Detroit as a part of final roster cuts; he was re-signed to the team's practice squad the following day. He was promoted to the active roster on November 7. On November 16, he was waived, but re-signed to the practice squad on November 18, only to be promoted back to the active roster three days later.
