= Avondale Mine disaster =

1869 fire in Pennsylvania, United States

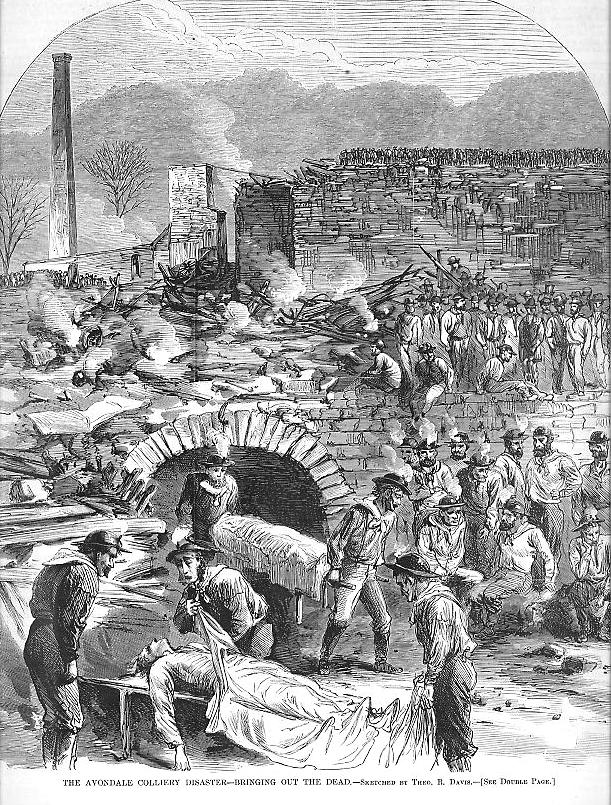
- An illustration of the aftermath of the September 1869 Avondale Mine disaster in Northeastern Pennsylvania
- Date: September 6, 1869
- Location: Plymouth Township, Pennsylvania, U.S.; 41°13′26″N 75°58′47″W
- Outcome: 110 deaths

The Avondale Mine disaster was a massive fire at the Avondale Colliery near Plymouth Township, Pennsylvania, on September 6, 1869. It caused the death of 110 workers. It started when the wooden lining of the mine shaft caught fire and ignited the coal breaker built directly overhead. The shaft was the only entrance and exit to the mine, and the fire trapped and suffocated 108 of the workers (the other two fatalities were rescuers). It was the greatest mine disaster to that point in American history.

One of the first global relief efforts occurred after the disaster, with donations for the families of victims arriving from all over the world. Another result of the fire was the enacting by the Pennsylvania General Assembly of legislation establishing safety regulations for the coal mining industry, making Pennsylvania the first state to enact such legislation. These laws mandated, among other things, that there must be at least two entrances to underground mines.

The disaster also caused thousands of miners to join the Workingmen's Benevolent Association, one of the first unions to represent coal miners in the United States. Continuing labor and social strife in the Pennsylvania anthracite coal fields resulted in an increase of the activities of the "Molly Maguires", a controversial organization that conducted violent attacks against anthracite coal mine operators. These conflicts eventually resulted in the trial and execution of twenty members of the Molly Maguires in Pottsville and Jim Thorpe.

== Historical background ==
The Steuben Shaft at Avondale Colliery is situated on the right bank of the Susquehanna River, four miles from Plymouth Township, Pennsylvania in Luzerne County. It was developed in 1867 by the Nanticoke Coal Company, a subsidiary of the Delaware, Lackawanna and Western Railroad. The 327-foot-deep (100 m) shaft allowed access to the 9-foot Red Ash Vein, which yielded a commercially desirable grade of anthracite. The shaft was lined with wooden timber, and partitioned into two sections. One section was reserved for upcast ventilation provided by a furnace; essentially, the upcast shaft was used as a chimney, with the hot exhaust gases drawing air up and out of the mine. The breaker was built directly on top of the mouth of the shaft, and coal was extracted by use of the room and pillar method. There was only one exit from the mine, namely, the shaft. This practice had been banned in England, but was common for anthracite coal mines in the United States.

The Steuben Shaft seemed to have been a disaster waiting to happen, but this was state-of-the-art construction for American deep-shaft coal mines at the time. It was also, by design, the most economic configuration possible. Lack of a second exit minimized non-productive development time, location of the breaker above the headframe reduced coal haulage to the processing point, and furnace ventilation required less capital outlay than mechanical (fan) ventilation, which had been developed a decade before in England.

About 200 workers were employed at the colliery, with the workforce being predominantly Welsh. A three-month strike had just ended, and the day shift was in the mine on Monday, September 6, 1869.

== Fire ==
During the morning of September 6, 1869, the coal breaker atop Steuben Shaft at the Avondale Colliery caught fire. The official investigators concluded that the furnace, located well over 100 feet from the shaft but connected to it by a flue, was the source of ignition, with flames traveling up the wood-reinforced shaft and engulfing the entire wooden structure up to the headhouse, 60 feet above the headframe. However, not everyone has accepted the theory, so ethnic conflict between Welsh and Irish workers, industrial espionage, and spontaneous combustion have also been considered as possible causes. The entire inside day shift was trapped underground.

The flames grew rapidly, quickly setting most of the surrounding wooden structures alight. James M. Corrigary, the writer of a research paper on the incident, described it as such: "Imagine a plane of fire running up at an angle of about thirty-three degrees toward the hill above, and after it has accomplished that distance, see it shoot up in one immense column into the air, while dense clouds of smoke envelope all surrounding objects, and the reader can have a faint idea of the spectacle."

== Early rescue attempts ==
As the fire increased, it attracted hundreds of people, especially families of trapped miners. The crowd eventually grew to almost ten thousand bystanders, helpless to do anything but watch as the buildings and shaft burned. Water was soon brought to diminish the fire. As soon as the flames had been extinguished sufficiently for rescuers to approach the shaft, preparations were made to put a derrick over the opening by which men could descend into the mine. The derrick was set up by around 5:30 p.m., and a consensus was reached to send a dog into the mine first to make sure it was safe. The dog was lowered in and brought out alive, indicating that it would be safe for humans.

Before the dog had been lowered into the shaft a number of men had called into the mine, hoping they would receive an answer from the imprisoned miners. Though some claimed to have heard a response, most had not heard anything. This was repeated after the dog had been brought up and the mine had been deemed safe, with the same result. A volunteer, Charles Vartue of the Grand Tunnel colliery, was then asked to descend into the mine and report on the conditions inside. At 6:30 p.m., Vartue stepped into a bucket attached to the derrick and was lowered slowly into the shaft. Fourteen minutes later, he gave a signal to ascend. Vartue reported that there was timber halfway down the shaft which caused an obstruction, and that at least two men would need to go down to remove it.

More volunteers were requested, and Charles Jones of Plymouth and Stephen Evans of Nottingham Shaft were selected to be lowered into the mine. Equipped with tools such as a hatchet and a hook, they signaled to stop their descent several times to remove obstructions. They reached the bottom of the shaft at 7:05 and stepped out to explore, emerging from the mine nine minutes later. They reported that they had found two dead mules in a gangway and had pounded on a closed door, but received no response.

Later in the evening another two volunteers, Thomas W. Williams of Plymouth and David Jones of Grand Tunnel, decided to enter the mine to discover the condition of the men within. They descended, and a pick and shovel were sent down after them. After waiting some time without report however, another pair of men were sent to look for them. Both Williams and Jones were found lying on the ground, unmoving. Williams was brought up immediately and declared dead from the fumes. Jones was brought up soon after and also declared dead. This demonstrated the rapid accumulation of blackdamp (carbon dioxide and low levels of oxygen incapable of supporting life). The presence of toxic levels of blackdamp made rescue efforts much more complicated, as nobody could stand the increasingly foul air for long periods of time.

== Recovery operation ==
The overwhelming presence of lethal levels of blackdamp augured little hope for the 108 trapped miners; rescue attempts yielded to recovery operations. The first priority was to ventilate the workings. A fan powered by a steam donkey engine arrived on site Tuesday morning. A 2-foot-diameter (0.61 m) canvas hose was dropped to the bottom of the shaft. Air was pumped down, the objective being to establish successive fresh air bases deeper in the mine. Operations were directed by Thomas George of Plymouth, with a crew of 50 volunteers. By late afternoon, crews had succeeded in advancing only 75 feet down the main gangway, despite fan ventilation. Much to the dismay of the rescuers, the ventilation furnace and an adjacent pile of coal were found blazing, negating efforts to ventilate the deeper mine. Since normal ventilation had been blocked by debris in the shaft and main gangway, blackdamp and whitedamp (carbon monoxide from incomplete combustion) continued to be produced at lethal levels by the furnace. By heroic efforts, the fire was extinguished with water piped from the surface, using the 300-foot pressure head as a natural motive force. Downcast fan ventilation was continued, and successive fresh air bases were established.

By 3 a.m. Wednesday, workers were able to move down the main gangway to the mule stable, several hundred feet inward. The first two victims were discovered, the stable boss and a young mule driver. Their "bodies were bloated with blood oozing from their mouths". By 6:30 a.m., workers arrived at the east gangway, which was a crosscut off the main gangway. A makeshift brattice (barrier) of coal, rock, scrap wood, mud, and canvas was encountered less than 100 feet inward. The brattice was constructed by the desperate trapped miners attempting to stop the infiltration of blackdamp, in the hope of surviving on cleaner deep mine air until rescue. Rescuers pierced the brattice, and encountered "a view which appalled the stoutest heart among them. Grouped together, in every possible position, laid the dead bodies of sixty-seven men and boys." Many victims appeared merely to be asleep; fathers embraced their sons, men assumed the attitude of prayer, others leaned against gangway walls. Some men had struggled for a final breath; their faces were buried in the coal dust of the floor or wrapped with their shirts. Eyeballs were protruded, and blood had foamed from mouths and noses.

More victims were discovered in small groups along nearly 500 feet inward on the east gangway throughout Wednesday and early Thursday morning. At 9:00 a.m., a canvas brattice was fashioned on the east gangway to direct air to the west gangway. More victims were discovered there, notably seven men who sealed themselves into a chamber. None of them were wearing shirts. The men had attempted to seal their makeshift brattice with their clothing.

A jury was impaneled on Wednesday by the Justice of the Peace and the Coroner of Luzerne County. The task of recovery and identification of the dead began. The first recovery was John Bowen, of Plymouth, leaving a wife and child. By late Thursday, September 9, 1869, the last body of 108 was recovered. He was John Powell of Avondale, also leaving a wife and child.

Considering the size of the community, the losses were catastrophic. One hundred ten deceased miners left behind 72 widows and 158 fatherless children. Not included in these numbers were families of widows and children in the countries of origin of immigrant miners who came to America alone. A Plymouth congregation lost all its male members.

== Inquest ==
On Saturday, September 11, 1869, a Coroner's inquest concerning the cause of the death of the victims of the disaster began at Shupp's Hall, Plymouth. The inquest had to deal with a crushing irony: The nascent anthracite miners' union, The Workingmen's Benevolent Association (WBA, founded 1868 by John Siney), had successfully petitioned the Pennsylvania State Legislature for the passage of a new mine safety act, which became law on April 12. The law codified ventilation requirements and stipulated the presence of a second entrance, in accord with contemporary British practice. This act did not apply to mines in Luzerne County, due to the efforts of George Turner, the Democratic state senator from Luzerne County.

Miners, foremen, mine union (WBA) representatives, mining experts, and representatives of the mine owners (Delaware, Lackawanna & Western Railroad) testified. Contention emerged concerning the fire's origin. Management intimated arson:

Henry J. Phillips, Mining engineer for D. L. & W. R.R.

Question. Have you any idea where the fire originated?

Answer. I thought first from the furnace; afterward....I think it [the shaft] was set on fire.

Other testimony from Welsh miners cited ethnic tension between Welsh and Irish miners, union-nonunion worker conflict, or labor-management conflict resulting from the earlier strike. Further testimony revealed the lack of firefighting equipment in the mine. Much testimony centered around the lack of a second exit and absence of deep mine air shafts, unsafe storage of combustibles, and a history of fires. Although the preponderance of testimony supported the conclusion that a second exit or air source removed from the main shaft would have saved the trapped miners, Company testimony was equivocal and misleading:

James Archibold, Chief Engineer of D. L. & W. R.R. and stockholder.

Question. Do you consider it safe to have a mine with only one opening?

Answer. I consider it relative no more danger getting on a railway train and riding one hundred miles than working in that mine.

The position of the union was made dramatically clear by representative Henry Evans:

In answer to a question from Mr. H. W. Evans, [an unidentified] witness said, "That seems intended to bring out a condemnation of the system of mining with but one outlet; I fully agree in condemning that system."

Mr. Evans said, "That is exactly the intention. We miners intend to prove here who is responsible for that system. We intend to prove that it is wrong - WRONG - to send men to work in such mines, and that we have known it for long years; but we must work or starve; that is where the miners stand on this question, and we mean to use this occasion to prove it."

Mr. Evans spoke with intense excitement and feeling, and his words drew a burst of applause from the miners in the audience.

Coroner Waldham reminded the audience that this was a court room; and that order and decorum must be preserved. The repetition of such remarks or demonstrations would make it necessary to clear the court room at once and exclude all spectators thereafter.

After deliberation, the Jury delivered its verdict:

An inquisition at Plymouth, in the County of Luzerne, the eighth, ninth, eleventh, and fourteenth days of September, in the year of our Lord, one thousand eight hundred and sixty-nine,...do say upon their oaths that...The cause of death of Palmer Steele [a miner] and other people sustained was the exhaustion of atmospheric air and the presence of the abundance of carbonic acid gasses in the said Avondale mines, caused by the burning of the Head House and Breaker at said mine, on the sixth day of September 1869, destroying the air courses leading from the mine through the shaft.

That the fire originated from the furnace in the mine, taking effect on the wood brattice to the up-cast air course leading from the bottom of the shaft to the Head House.

The jury regards the present system of mining in a large number of cases now working by shaft as insecure and unsafe to the miner, and would strongly recommend, in all cases where practicable, two places for ingress and egress and a more practical means of ventilation, thereby rendering greater security to the life of the miner under any similar accident.

== Sources ==
- Dublin, Thomas; Licht, Walter (2005). The face of decline: the Pennsylvania anthracite region in the twentieth century. Ithaca: Cornell UP. ISBN 0-8014-8473-1.
- Kenny, Kevin (1998). Making sense of the Molly Maguires. Oxford: Oxford UP. ISBN 0-19-511631-3.
- Hughes, Herbert William (1892). A text-book of coal-mining: for the use of colliery managers and others. Oxford: J. B. Lippincott & Co. ISBN 1-117-24740-6.
- Ronald, L. Lewis (2008). Welsh Americans: a history of assimilation in the coalfields. Chapel Hill: The University of North Carolina Press. ISBN 978-0-8078-3220-2.
- Roberts, Peter (1901). The Anthracite Coal Industry: A Study of the Economic Conditions and Relations of the Co-operative Forces in the Development of the Anthracite Coal Industry in Pennsylvania. New York: Macmillan. ISBN 0-548-98501-4.
- Smith, Robert Samuel (1907). The Black Trail of Anthracite. Kingston: S. R. Smith. ISBN 1-141-23593-5.
- Wallace, Anthony F. C. (1988). St. Clair: A Nineteenth-Century Coal Town's Experience With a Disaster-Prone Industry. New York: Cornell UP. ISBN 0-8014-9900-3.
- Wolensky, Robert P.; Keating, Joseph M. (2008). Tragedy at Avondale: The Causes, Consequences, and Legacy of the Pennsylvania Anthracite Coal Industry's Most Deadly Mining Disaster. Easton: Canal History and Technology Press. ISBN 978-0-930973-40-7.
