= Avondale High School =

Avondale High School may refer to:

== In the United Kingdom ==
- Avondale High School (Cheadle Heath) in Stockport, England

== In the United States ==
- Avondale High School (DeKalb County, Georgia) in DeKalb County, Georgia
- Avondale High School (Michigan), Auburn Hills, Michigan

== See also ==
- Avondale School (Wiltshire) in Wiltshire, England.
- Avondale School (Cooranbong) in New South Wales, Australia.
