= John Morton (American football) =

American football player and coach (born 1969)

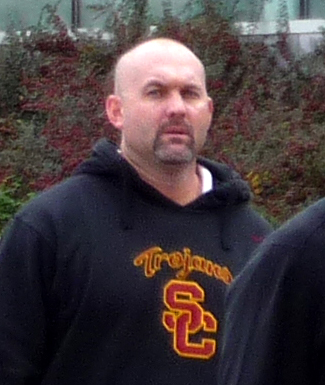
- Morton with the USC Trojans in 2008

Denver Broncos
- Title: Offensive pass game coordinator

Personal information
- Born: September 24, 1969 (age 57); Auburn Hills, Michigan, U.S.
- Listed height: 6 ft 0 in (1.83 m)
- Listed weight: 186 lb (84 kg)

Career information
- Position: Wide receiver
- High school: Avondale (Auburn Hills, Michigan)
- College: Western Michigan
- NFL draft: 1993: undrafted

Career history

Playing
- Oakland Raiders (1993)*; Green Bay Packers (1993)*; Oakland Raiders (1994)*; Jacksonville Jaguars (1995)*; Toronto Argonauts (1995); Oakland Raiders (1996)*; Toronto Argonauts (1996); Frankfurt Galaxy (1997)
- * Offseason or practice squad member only

Coaching
- Oakland Raiders (1998–2004); Offensive assistant (1998–1999); Offensive quality control coach (2000–2001); Senior offensive assistant (2002–2003); Tight ends coach (2004); San Diego (2005) Passing game & wide receivers coach; New Orleans Saints (2006) Passing game coordinator & offensive assistant; USC (2007–2010); Passing game coordinator & wide receivers coach (2007–2008); Offensive coordinator & wide receivers coach (2009–2010); San Francisco 49ers (2011–2014) Wide receivers coach; New Orleans Saints (2015–2016) Wide receivers coach; New York Jets (2017) Offensive coordinator; Oakland / Las Vegas Raiders (2019–2021) Senior offensive assistant; Detroit Lions (2022) Senior offensive assistant; Denver Broncos (2023–2024) Offensive pass game coordinator; Detroit Lions (2025) Offensive coordinator; Denver Broncos (2025–present); Offensive consultant (2025); Offensive pass game coordinator (2026–present)
- Coaching profile at Pro Football Reference

John Morton (born September 24, 1969) is an American professional football coach and former wide receiver who is the offensive pass game coordinator for the Denver Broncos of the National Football League (NFL). He previously served as the passing game coordinator for the Broncos from 2023 to 2024, and was the Detroit Lions offensive coordinator in 2025.

Morton has also served as a senior offensive assistant coach for the New York Jets, New Orleans Saints, San Francisco 49ers, Las Vegas Raiders and at USC.

== Playing career ==
Morton played college football at Western Michigan, where he was a wide receiver. He played wide receiver professionally for the Canadian Football League Toronto Argonauts and on the practice squads of the Oakland Raiders and Green Bay Packers.

Pre-draft measurables
Height	Weight	Arm length	Hand span	40-yard dash	10-yard split	20-yard split	20-yard shuttle	Vertical jump
5 ft 11 7/8 in (1.83 m)	186 lb (84 kg)	31 1/4 in (0.79 m)	9 3/4 in (0.25 m)	4.39 s	1.55 s	2.59 s	4.30 s	36.5 in (0.93 m)

== Coaching career ==
=== Oakland Raiders ===
After ending his playing career in 1997, Morton began working for the National Football League's Oakland Raiders, initially in the personnel department for one season. In 1998, he took a coaching position in the organization, originally as an offensive assistant working with wide receivers, and eventually was promoted to senior offensive assistant on a team that made it to Super Bowl XXXVII under head coach Bill Callahan. After another year at the position, he was elevated to Tight Ends Coach for the 2004 season under new Raiders head coach Norv Turner.

=== San Diego ===
In 2005, he joined Jim Harbaugh's staff at the University of San Diego, a D-IAA college program, where he coached the passing game and wide receivers for a squad that went 11–1–0 and won the Pioneer Football League Championship.

=== New Orleans Saints ===
In 2006, Morton was hired by the New Orleans Saints as their passing game coordinator and offensive assistant under head coach Sean Payton, who advanced to the 2006 NFC Championship game.

=== USC ===
In 2007, Morton joined the University of Southern California (USC) as their passing game coordinator and wide receivers coach. When offensive coordinator Steve Sarkisian accepted a head coaching position with Washington, Morton was interviewed by head coach Pete Carroll as a candidate for the position. As expected, Morton eventually got the job. In 2010, Morton was retained as offensive coordinator and wide receivers coach under head coach Lane Kiffin.

=== San Francisco 49ers ===
In 2011, Morton was hired as a wide receiver coach under head coach Jim Harbaugh.

=== New Orleans Saints ===
In 2014, Morton was hired as a wide receiver coach under head coach Sean Payton.

=== New York Jets ===
In 2017, Morton was hired by the New York Jets as their offensive coordinator under head coach Todd Bowles. On January 17, 2018, Morton was subsequently fired.

=== Oakland / Las Vegas Raiders ===
In February 2019, Morton was hired by the Oakland Raiders as a senior offensive assistant under head coach Jon Gruden.

=== Detroit Lions ===
In 2022, Morton was hired by the Detroit Lions as a senior offensive assistant under head coach Dan Campbell.

=== Denver Broncos ===
On February 26, 2023, Morton was hired by the Denver Broncos as their passing game coordinator, reuniting with head coach Sean Payton.

Morton was heavily credited for helping enhance the development of rookie quarterback Bo Nix. His pass design was praised for helping Nix become more confident in finding defensive holes and building chemistry with his receivers.

=== Detroit Lions (second stint) ===
On January 30, 2025, Morton was hired by the Detroit Lions as their offensive coordinator, replacing Ben Johnson, after his departure to become head coach of the Chicago Bears. On November 16, Morton was relieved of his duties as offensive playcaller with head coach Dan Campbell assuming the role for the remainder of the season. On January 6, 2026, Morton was fired by the Lions after one season.

=== Denver Broncos (second stint) ===
On January 17, 2026, it was announced that Morton had re-joined the Denver Broncos' staff for the postseason as a consultant. On February 22, Morton was re-hired by the Broncos in his previous position of offensive pass game coordinator.

== Personal life ==
Morton has two daughters, Tierney and Sage.
