= Avens =

Avens may refer to:

== Flowering plants ==
- The genus Dryas
- The genus Geum

== People ==
- Robert Avens, author, notably of a book about Henry Corbin
- Pjotrs Avens, Latvian name of Petr Aven, Russian businessman and politician of Latvian descent

== Other ==
- The Avens bridge across South Holston Lake in Virginia, U.S.A
- Avens B.V., a defunct company associated with Landsbank Íslandsi
- Audio-Visual Education in Neurosurgery (AVENS) was a multimedia journal for neurosurgeons

== See also ==
- Aven (disambiguation)
