= Pinedale Shores, Alabama =

Pinedale Shores may refer to the following populated places in Alabama, United States:

- Pinedale Shores, Marshall County, Alabama
- Pinedale Shores, Saint Clair County, Alabama

== See also ==
- Pinedale (disambiguation)
