= Oakland Christian School =

Private school in Auburn Hills, Michigan, US

Location
- 3075 Shimmons Road; Auburn Hills, Michigan 48326; United States
- Coordinates: 42°41′20.5″N 83°13′58.6″W

Information
- School type: Private K-12 school
- Motto: The Mission of Oakland Christian School is to equip students to pursue their unique God-given purpose.
- Established: 1968
- NCES School ID: 00641328
- Superintendent: Susan Brock
- Elementary Principal: Mrs. Terri A. Clark
- Secondary Principal: Brian Eddy
- Director of Athletics: Anthony Newell
- Faculty: 51 FTEs
- Grades: Jr. Kindergarten–12
- Enrollment: 560 (as of 2025–26)
- Student to teacher ratio: 11:1
- Colors: Green and Gold
- Team name: Lancers
- Accreditation: North Central Association of Colleges and Schools and Association of Christian Schools International
- Website: www.oaklandchristian.com

Oakland Christian School (OCS) is a private pre-kindergarten–12 Christian school located in Auburn Hills, Oakland County, Michigan.

As of the 2025–26 school year, the school had an enrollment of 560 students and 51 classroom teachers (on an FTE basis), for a student–teacher ratio of 11:1. The school's student body was 80.8% (412) White, 6.5% (33) Black, 6.1% (31) Hispanic, 4.3% (22) two or more races, 2.2% (11) Asian and 0.2% (1) Native Hawaiian / Pacific Islander.

== Campus ==
The campus is located at 3075 Shimmons Road, Auburn Hills, Michigan 48326, United States.

== Athletics ==
Oakland Christian Lancers Girls logo

Oakland Christian is a member of the Michigan High School Athletic Association (MHSAA), the Michigan Independent Athletic Conference (MIAC), and the National Christian School Athletic Association (NCSAA). School teams have won 5 state, 38 regional, 75 district, and 97 conference titles. OCS offers 20 varsity sports teams, 4 junior varsity teams, 12 middle school teams, and several elementary sports teams and clubs.

== Elementary ==
The Elementary school is Jr. Kindergarten (both 1/2 day and full day options are available) through 5th grade.

== Middle school ==
The middle school program covers 6th grade through 8th grade.

== High school ==
The high school is 9th through 12th grade.

The high school program is predominantly college preparatory with a vocational technology component available through Oakland Technology Center. The college preparatory math program includes Algebra I & II, Geometry, Pre-Calculus and Calculus. The college prep science program includes Conceptual Physics, Biology I & II, Chemistry and Physics. Advanced Placement courses are offered through the Michigan Virtual School. Additionally, a guest student program is available through Oakland Community College and Oakland University for high school students who wish to dual-enroll.

== History ==
In the fall of 1968, 51 students in grades 7-12 began classes in the basement of Oakland Avenue Presbyterian Church, followed by a second semester move to Avondale Baptist Church for added space. The first five students graduated in 1969 and as enrollment rose, the school began the start of the 1969–70 school year at St. Luke's United Methodist Church. At the beginning of the 1970–71 school year, Grades 5 and 6 were added leading to an enrollment that tripled. Another move to St. Michael's Church in Pontiac at the beginning of the 1972–73 school year provided more space. As the student body continued to rise, plans were being made for one final move. In September 1976, prayers were answered when 50 acres of land were donated for a new facility on Shimmons Road in Auburn Hills. As construction began, elementary students were housed at Five Points Community Church while secondary students stayed at St. Michael's. On October 15, 1977, 383 students and faculty finally began classes in the new spacious school. As enrollment continued to climb, five modular classrooms were purchased between 1980–86 to accommodate the increased demand and to relieve congestion in the high school library.

To free up more classroom space and secure the business office in the main building, an office complex was connected to the main building at the beginning of the 1986–87 school year. With enrollment continuing to rise, the kindergarten program moved to Five Points Community Church in order to accommodate two sections of each elementary grade level and eliminate long waiting lists.

Sparked by an increased enrollment of over 600 students in 1992–93, Oakland Christian School added an extra period to the day to meet an increase in demands for more science and math classes. During the mid-nineties, plans for the addition to the existing structure were initiated. In 1996, the board of Oakland Christian School implemented a capital campaign that would raise money for additional classrooms, a media center and a multi-purpose facility. In so doing, the new structure would allow for a cafeteria, eliminating the use of the present gym during lunches. In addition, kindergarten classes would be brought back to the main campus and the modular classrooms removed.

== Notable alumni ==
- Brett Reed - Head coach of NCAA Division 1 Lehigh University men's basketball team
- Rocco Grimaldi - American Hockey Player drafted by the Florida Panthers of the National Hockey League in the 2011 National Hockey League Entry Draft
- Caleb Stanko - American Soccer Player playing for FC Cincinnati of Major League Soccer previously played for SC Freiburg in Germany
