= Shalmstry =

Coordinates: 58.56°N 3.49°W

- Location within the Caithness area
- OS grid reference: ND1305864631
  - Edinburgh: 192 miles (309 km)
  - London: 507 miles (816 km)
- Council area: Highland
- Lieutenancy area: Caithness
- Country: Scotland
- Sovereign state: United Kingdom
- Post town: Shalmstry
- Postcode district: KW1
- Dialling code: 01847
- UK Parliament: Caithness, Sutherland and Easter Ross
- Scottish Parliament: Caithness, Sutherland and Ross

Shalmstry is a small settlement in Caithness, Scotland. It is just under 3 miles (5 kilometres) south of Thurso. It is located off the A9 and is remote. The settlements of Weydale and Sordale can be found to the south and Thurso to the north via the A9.

== Local geography ==
Shalmstry is similar to the rest of the remote countryside nearby, with large amounts of grassland and some marsh and wetlands near the local water outlets and the River Thurso. Apart from Thurso, there are no large settlements, only small hamlets and scattered settlements in places. Shalmstry fits this trend as it is a remote, small, settlement in the countryside, with some houses and farmland.

== Local area ==
The local area around Shalmstry consists mainly of grassland. There are a few farms, tracks, paths and settlements but the nearest town is Thurso which is a 6 minute drive away along the A9. To walk it takes about 51 minutes. There are little facilities in the area. There are no bus stops and no known pay phones. Taxis are available. The nearest post office and other basic facilities are nearby but supermarkets and emergency services are in Thurso. With it being at the far north of Scotland, all the large settlements are south, apart from Wick which is to the East. To get to cities such as Glasgow and Edinburgh, you would need to drive or take long distance public transport.

== Local transport ==
There are no public bus services running through Shalmstry. Trains to Inverness can be found at Thurso railway station. Other public Bus Services can also be found in Thurso to the local area and also Wick. The A9 runs through the village though so taxis are an option here.
