= Cooperdale, Ohio =

Unincorporated community in Ohio, U.S.

Coordinates: 40°13′11″N 82°03′55″W

Cooperdale is an unincorporated community in Coshocton County, in the U.S. state of Ohio.

== History ==
Cooperdale was named for George Cooper, who founded the town when the Cleveland, Akron and Columbus Railroad was extended to that point. A post office was established at Cooperdale in 1888, and remained in operation until 1955.
