= Summerdale =

Summerdale may refer to

== Places ==
- Summerdale, Alabama
- Summerdale, Pennsylvania
- Summerdale (Neighborhood), Philadelphia, PA

== Other ==
- the Summerdale scandals
