= Forestdale =

Forestdale or Forest Dale may refer to several places:

In Australia:

- Forestdale, Queensland, a suburb of Logan City
- Forrestdale, Western Australia, a suburb of Armadale

In England:

- Forestdale, London

In the United States:

- Forestdale, Alabama
- Forestdale, Massachusetts
- Forestdale, Rhode Island
- Forest Dale, Vermont
- Forest Dale Historic District, in Salt Lake City, Utah
- Forestdale (agency) is a child care agency in New York City
