= Avondale, Parramatta =

Avondale
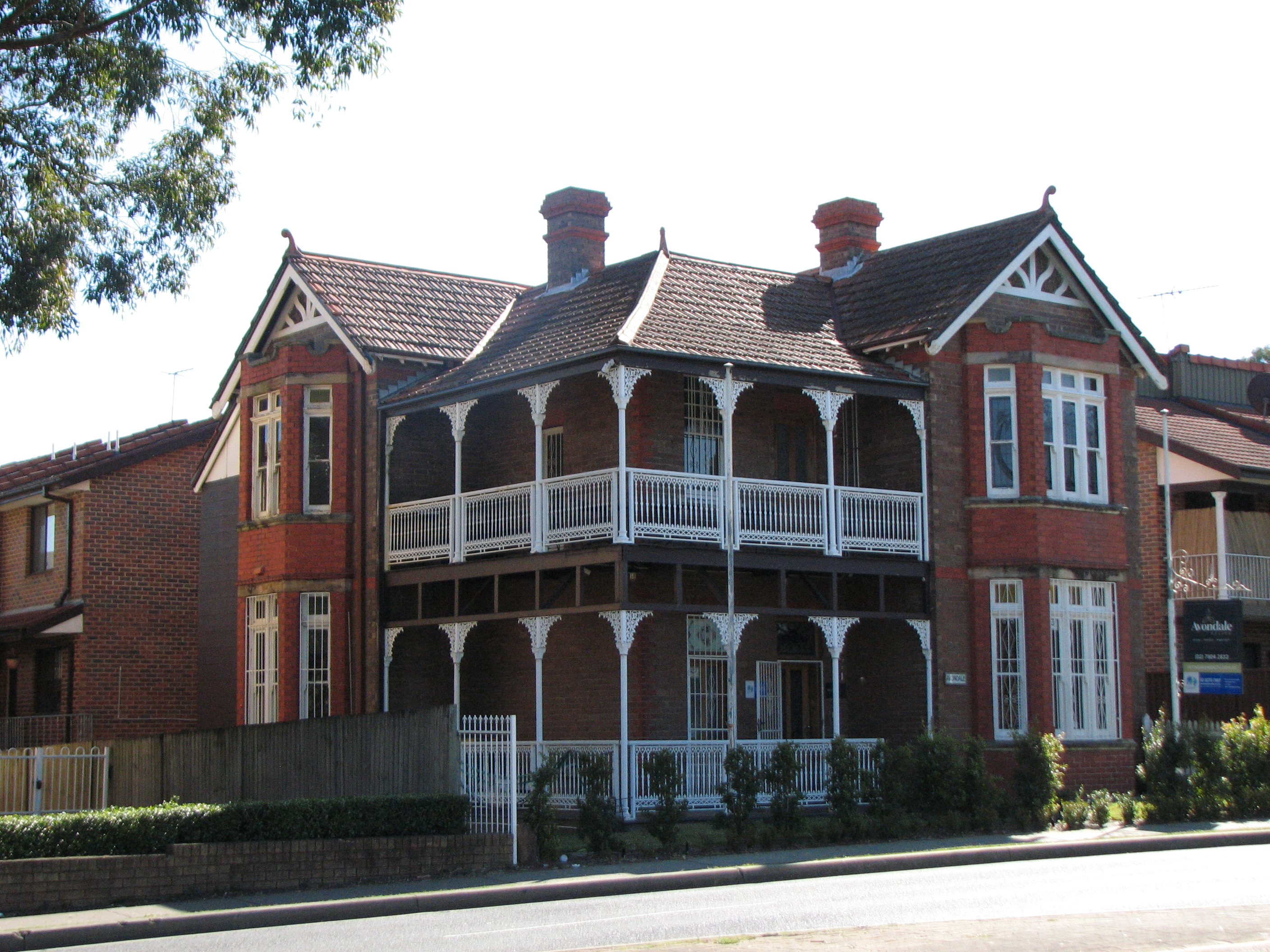
- Avondale, a heritage listed property in Parramatta, New South Wales

- Location within Sydney Location within Australia
- 33.8048°S 151.0031°E
- Location: 25 O'Connell Street, Parramatta, Sydney, New South Wales, Australia

New South Wales Heritage Register
- Official name: Avondale
- Type: state heritage (built)
- Designated: 2 April 1999
- Reference no.: 239
- Type: House
- Category: Residential buildings (private)

Avondale is a heritage-listed former residence and now offices at 25 O'Connell Street, Parramatta, Sydney, New South Wales, Australia. It was added to the New South Wales State Heritage Register on 2 April 1999.

== History ==
The land on which Avondale now sits was auctioned by the Crown in November 1893. The Avondale house was built c. 1900. It passed through a succession of owners as a private residence, and was briefly operated as a private hospital (1924) and private school (1929).

A section 130 order was placed over Avondale on 9 January 1981 to prevent its demolition. Under section 132 of the Heritage Act the owner gave notice of his intention to demolish the building. On 27 February 1981 an Interim Heritage Order was placed over the building. On 14 January 1982, the Heritage Council approved an application to renovate Avondale and incorporate it into a town house development to the rear of the site and of the neighbouring site. This development was later deferred and did not proceed.

On 14 May 1984, the Heritage Council approved an application to use Avondale as offices and for external treatment of the building and fencing. It remains as commercial offices in 2018.

A Permanent Conservation Order was placed over the building on 18 February 1983. It was transferred to the State Heritage Register on 2 April 1999.

== Description ==
Avondale is a two-storey brick and tile building which has external timber detailing in the Federation style. The brickwork is a dull brown with re grain features and the roof is gabled and hipped with bellcast detailing over the verandah. The verandah is two-storey on two sides with cast iron posts and balustrade with geometrical coloured tile paving on the ground level. A crenellated parapet exists over the front on the gabled front wing.

== Heritage listing ==
Avondale was listed on the New South Wales State Heritage Register on 2 April 1999. It is historically significant and is representative.
