= Gardendale =

Gardendale is the name of several places in the United States:

- Gardendale, Alabama
- Gardendale, Texas
- Gardendale, Michigan in Fort Gratiot Township
