= Pinedale =

Pinedale may refer to:

== Geography ==
- Pinedale, Alberta, Canada
- United States:
  - Pinedale, Arizona
  - Pinedale, California
  - Pinedale, New Mexico
  - Pinedale, Wyoming

== Science ==
- Pinedale glaciation

== See also ==
- Pinedale Shores, Alabama (disambiguation)
