= Craigavon (disambiguation) =

Craigavon is a planned town in Northern Ireland.

Craigavon may also refer to:

- Craigavon Borough Council, 1972–2015 local government area centred on the planned town
- Viscount Craigavon, title in the Peerage of the United Kingdom
  - James Craig, 1st Viscount Craigavon (1871–1940) first Prime Minister of Northern Ireland, namesake of the planned town
- Craigavon, Alberta, a locality in Strathcona County, Alberta, Canada

== See also ==
- Craigavon Bridge, Derry, County Londonderry, Northern Ireland
- A.F.C. Craigavon, football club based in the town
- Craigavon City F.C., football club
