= Lauderdale (disambiguation) =

Lauderdale, denoting "dale of the river Leader", is the dale and region around that river in south-eastern Scotland.

Lauderdale may also refer to:

== People ==
- Earl of Lauderdale
- Andrew Lauderdale (born 1993), American football player
- Dallas Lauderdale, professional basketball player
- Dwight Lauderdale, former TV news anchor
- James Lauderdale, American military officer in the Creek War and War of 1812
- Jim Lauderdale, singer-songwriter
- John Maitland, 1st Duke of Lauderdale (1616-1682), member of the Cabal Ministry of Charles II of England
- Thomas Lauderdale, musician
- Priest Lauderdale, former professional basketball player

== Place names ==
- Lauderdale, Tasmania, Australia
- Lauderdale, Edmonton, Alberta, Canada, a residential neighbourhood
- Lauderdale, Sabaragamuwa, Sri Lanka, also known as Laudaradola, a locality and hill near Rakwana.
- Lauderdale Road, Maida Vale, London, United Kingdom
- Lauderdale Tower, Barbican Estate, London, United Kingdom

=== United States ===
- Lauderdale, Louisiana, Allen Parish, Louisiana
- Lauderdale, Minnesota
- Lauderdale (Buchanan, Virginia)
- Lauderdale, Mississippi
- Lauderdale, Wisconsin
- Lauderdale County, Alabama
- Lauderdale County, Mississippi
- Lauderdale County, Tennessee
- Fort Lauderdale, Florida, and the surroundings:
  - Lauderdale Lakes, Florida
  - North Lauderdale, Florida
  - Lauderdale-by-the-Sea, Florida

== Other uses ==
- Lauderdale (film), a movie on USA Up All Night
