= Irondale =

Irondale is the name of several places in the United States:

- Irondale, Alabama
- Irondale, Georgia
- Irondale, Missouri
- Irondale, New York
- Irondale, Ohio
- Irondale, Washington
- Irondale Township, Minnesota

Irondale may also refer to:

- Irondale, Ontario
- Irondale High School, a public school in New Brighton, Minnesota
