= Auburn Hills, Michigan =

- City
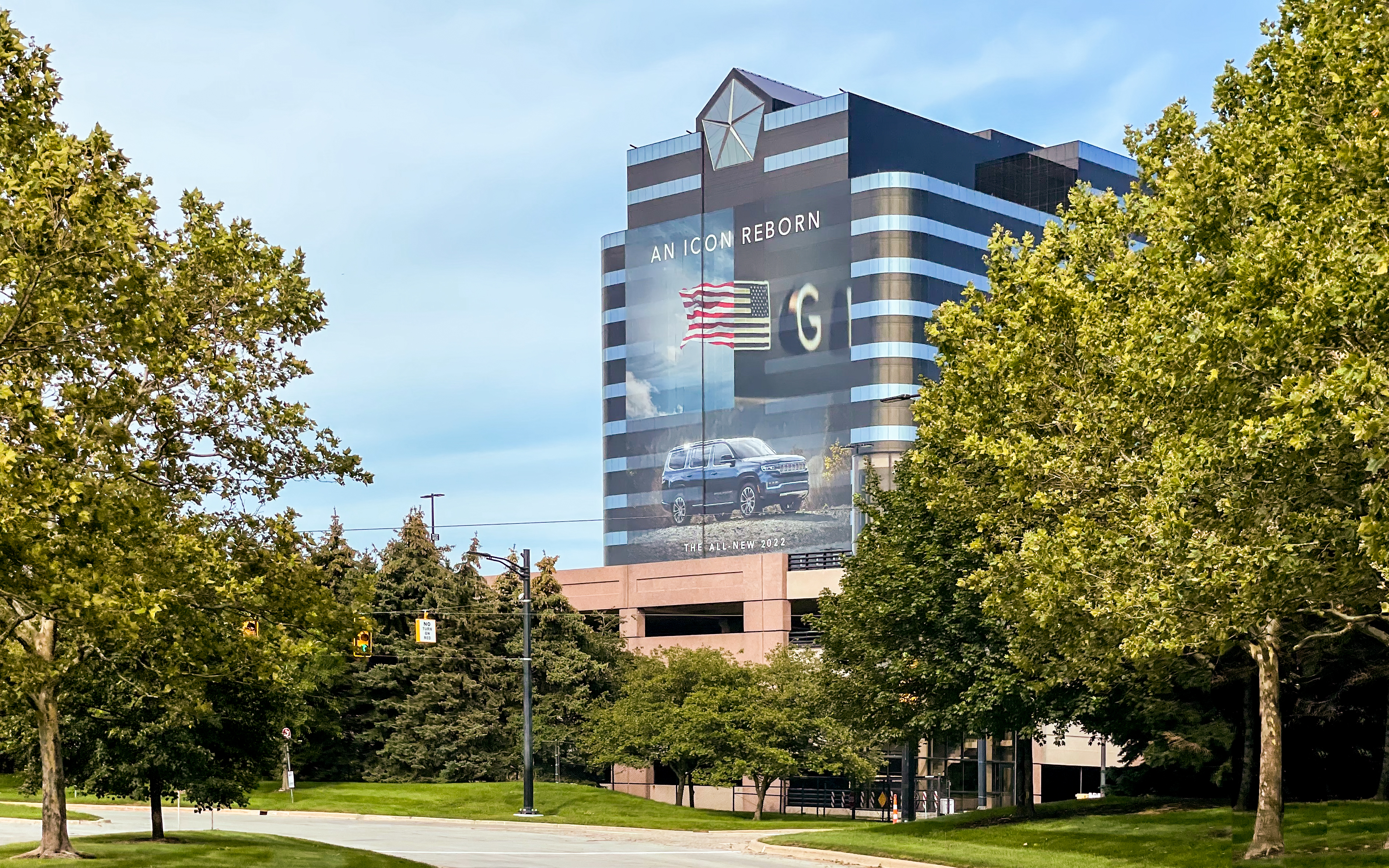
- Chrysler World Headquarters and Technology Center

- Flag
- Motto: "Honoring The Past. Building The Future"
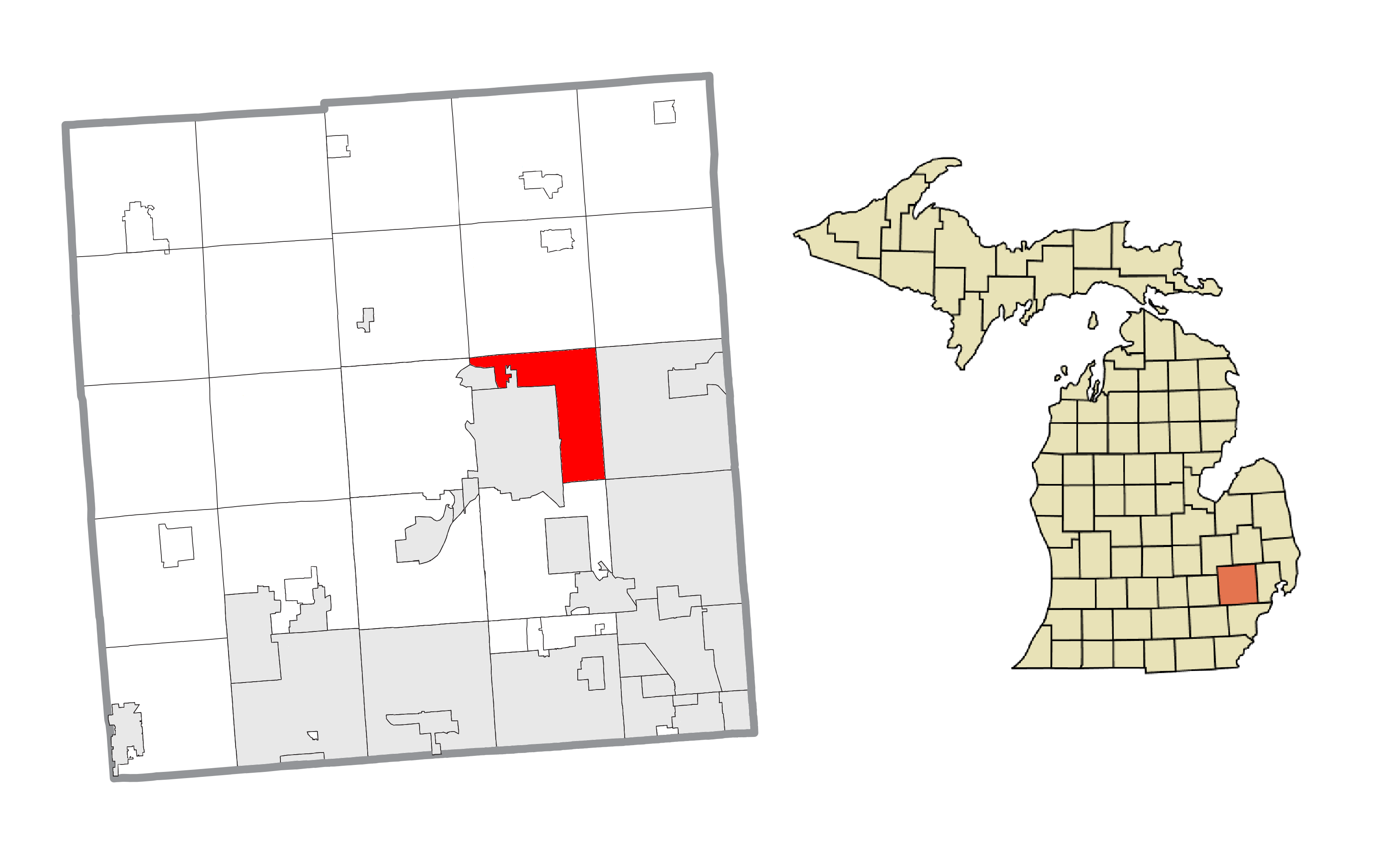
- Location within Oakland County

- Location within the state of Michigan
- Coordinates: 42°41′15″N 83°14′03″W
- Country: United States
- State: Michigan
- County: Oakland
- Settled: 1821
- Incorporated: 1983

Government
  - Type: Council–manager
  - Mayor: Brian Marzolf (D)
  - Manager: Thomas Tanghe

Area
  - City: 16.68 sq mi (43.21 km^{2})
  - Land: 16.64 sq mi (43.10 km^{2})
  - Water: 0.042 sq mi (0.11 km^{2})
- Elevation: 961 ft (293 m)

Population (2020)
  - City: 24,360
  - Density: 1,464.0/sq mi (565.26/km^{2})
  - Metro: 4,296,250 (Metro Detroit)
- Time zone: UTC-5 (EST)
  - Summer (DST): UTC-4 (EDT)
- ZIP code(s): 48309 (Rochester); 48326
- Area codes: 248 and 947
- FIPS code: 26-04105
- GNIS feature ID: 1675443
- Website: auburnhills.org

Auburn Hills is a city in Oakland County in the U.S. state of Michigan. A northern suburb of Detroit, Auburn Hills is located about 26 miles (42 km) north of downtown Detroit. As of the 2020 census, the city had a population of 24,360.

Auburn Hills is notable as the home of Oakland University, and the site of the North American headquarters of Stellantis. The city is a major hub of manufacturing and commerce, particularly in the automotive industry, with facilities of more than 50 automotive corporations. Before incorporating as a city in 1983, the area was part of the now-defunct Pontiac Township.

== History ==
In 1821, Auburn Hills began as Pontiac Township which included the village of Auburn at what is today the corner of Auburn and Squirrel roads. Situated on the Clinton River, it was named by Aaron Webster, the first settler, for Auburn, New York. His sawmill and grist mill attracted settlers to Auburn. After the streets were laid out in 1826, Auburn rivaled nearby Pontiac until the 1860s, when it lost its own prosperity. The town was renamed Amy in 1880, and it officially became Auburn Heights in 1919. Pontiac Township bordered the city of Pontiac on two sides.

In 1908, automobile pioneer John Dodge bought a farmhouse 3 miles (4.8 km) northeast of Auburn Heights to use as his country retreat. He and his wife, Matilda Dodge Wilson, continued to buy farmland, eventually totaling 1,400 acres. Dodge died in 1920, and Matilda Dodge later married lumber baron Alfred Gaston Wilson, with whom she built one of America's castles, Meadow Brook Hall, on a portion of the estate in present day Rochester Hills at a cost of $4 million ($58.2 million in 2025). In 1957, Matilda Dodge Wilson donated her land to Michigan State University, leading to the creation of Oakland University.

John Dodge's oldest child, Winifred Dodge, married real estate baron Wesson Seyburn, who built his own country retreat 2.5 miles (4.0 km) north of Auburn Heights. The estate included hunting land, dog kennels, a swimming pool, horse stables, and a 5,000-square-foot (460 m^{2}) Colonial Revival house. Pontiac Township purchased the estate in 1975, and adapted the buildings for government use. Today, it is known as the Auburn Hills Civic Center.

The first recorded use of the name "Auburn Hills," in 1964, was by Oakland Community College. They named their campus (a former Nike missile base) at Featherstone and Squirrel roads for the town of Auburn and the hilly terrain in the area.

=== Incorporation history ===
The township attempted to incorporate as Pontiac Heights in 1971, but was denied by state officials. Pontiac Township became a charter township in 1978, to protect itself from further annexation. In 1983, Pontiac Township merged with the village of Auburn Heights to become the City of Auburn Hills. It is not to be confused with the similarly named city of Auburn, Michigan, that exists in Bay County, near Saginaw Bay.

== Geography ==
According to the United States Census Bureau, the city has a total area of 16.64 square miles (43.10 km^{2}), of which 16.60 square miles (42.99 km^{2}) is land and 0.04 square miles (0.10 km^{2}) (0.24%) is water.

== Government ==
=== Federal, state, and county legislators ===
United States House of Representatives
District	Representative	Party	Since
11th	Haley Stevens	Democratic	2019

Michigan Senate
District	Senator	Party	Since
7th	Jeremy Moss	Democratic	2023

Michigan House of Representatives
District	Representative	Party	Since
53rd	Brenda Carter	Democratic	2019
54th	Donni Steele	Republican	2023

Oakland County Board of Commissioners
District	Commissioner	Party	Since
4	Brendan Johnson	Democratic	2023

== Demographics ==
Historical population
Census	Pop.	Note	%±
1880	111		—
1990	17,076		—
2000	19,837		16.2%
2010	21,412		7.9%
2020	24,360		13.8%
U.S. Decennial Census

=== 2020 census ===
As of the 2020 census, Auburn Hills had a population of 24,360. The median age was 31.7 years. 14.4% of residents were under the age of 18 and 13.9% of residents were 65 years of age or older. For every 100 females there were 95.8 males, and for every 100 females age 18 and over there were 95.4 males age 18 and over.

100.0% of residents lived in urban areas, while 0.0% lived in rural areas.

There were 10,253 households in Auburn Hills, of which 20.3% had children under the age of 18 living in them. Of all households, 35.2% were married-couple households, 26.9% were households with a male householder and no spouse or partner present, and 30.6% were households with a female householder and no spouse or partner present. About 37.0% of all households were made up of individuals and 10.2% had someone living alone who was 65 years of age or older.

There were 11,032 housing units, of which 7.1% were vacant. The homeowner vacancy rate was 2.0% and the rental vacancy rate was 6.5%.

Racial composition as of the 2020 census
Race	Number	Percent
White	14,507	59.6%
Black or African American	3,816	15.7%
American Indian and Alaska Native	104	0.4%
Asian	3,404	14.0%
Native Hawaiian and Other Pacific Islander	16	0.1%
Some other race	792	3.3%
Two or more races	1,721	7.1%
Hispanic or Latino (of any race)	1,770	7.3%

=== 2010 census ===
As of the census of 2010, there were 21,412 people, 8,844 households, and 4,923 families living in the city. The population density was 1,289.9 inhabitants per square mile (498.0/km^{2}). There were 9,965 housing units at an average density of 600.3 per square mile (231.8/km^{2}). The racial makeup of the city was 66.3% White, 18.5% African American, 0.3% Native American, 8.9% Asian, 2.7% from other races, and 3.4% from two or more races. Hispanic or Latino of any race were 7.8% of the population.

There were 8,844 households, of which 27.0% had children under the age of 18 living with them, 38.8% were married couples living together, 12.4% had a female householder with no husband present, 4.5% had a male householder with no wife present, and 44.3% were non-families. 33.5% of all households were made up of individuals, and 7.3% had someone living alone who was 65 years of age or older. The average household size was 2.24 and the average family size was 2.90.

The median age in the city was 31.4 years. 19.4% of residents were under the age of 18; 17.8% were between the ages of 18 and 24; 31.9% were from 25 to 44; 21.6% were from 45 to 64; and 9.4% were 65 years of age or older. The gender makeup of the city was 48.4% female and 51.6% male.

=== 2000 census ===
As of the census of 2000, there were 19,837 people, 8,064 households, and 4,604 families living in the city. The population density was 1,194.5 inhabitants per square mile (461.2/km^{2}). There were 8,822 housing units at an average density of 531.2 per square mile (205.1/km^{2}). The racial makeup of the city was 75.92% White, 13.22% African American, 0.32% Native American, 6.33% Asian, 0.04% Pacific Islander, 1.56% from other races, and 2.61% from two or more races. Hispanic or Latino of any race were 4.50% of the population.

There were 8,064 households, out of which 26.7% had children under the age of 18 living with them; 43.0% were married couples living together; 10.5% had a female householder with no husband present and 42.9% were non-families. 33.1% of all households were made up of individuals, and 6.0% had someone living alone who was 65 years of age or older. The average household size was 2.25 and the average family size was 2.92.

The age distribution is 20.4% under the age of 18, 15.9% from 18 to 24, 38.1% from 25 to 44, 18.2% from 45 to 64, and 7.3% who were 65 years of age or older. The median age was 31 years. For every 100 females, there were 98.3 males. For every 100 females age 18 and over, there were 97.5 males.

The median income for a household in the city was $51,376, and the median income for a family was $60,849. Males had a median income of $45,686 versus $34,015 for females. The per capita income for the city was $25,529. About 3.9% of families and 6.3% of the population were below the poverty line, including 6.4% of those under age 18 and 4.4% of those age 66 or over.

== Economy ==
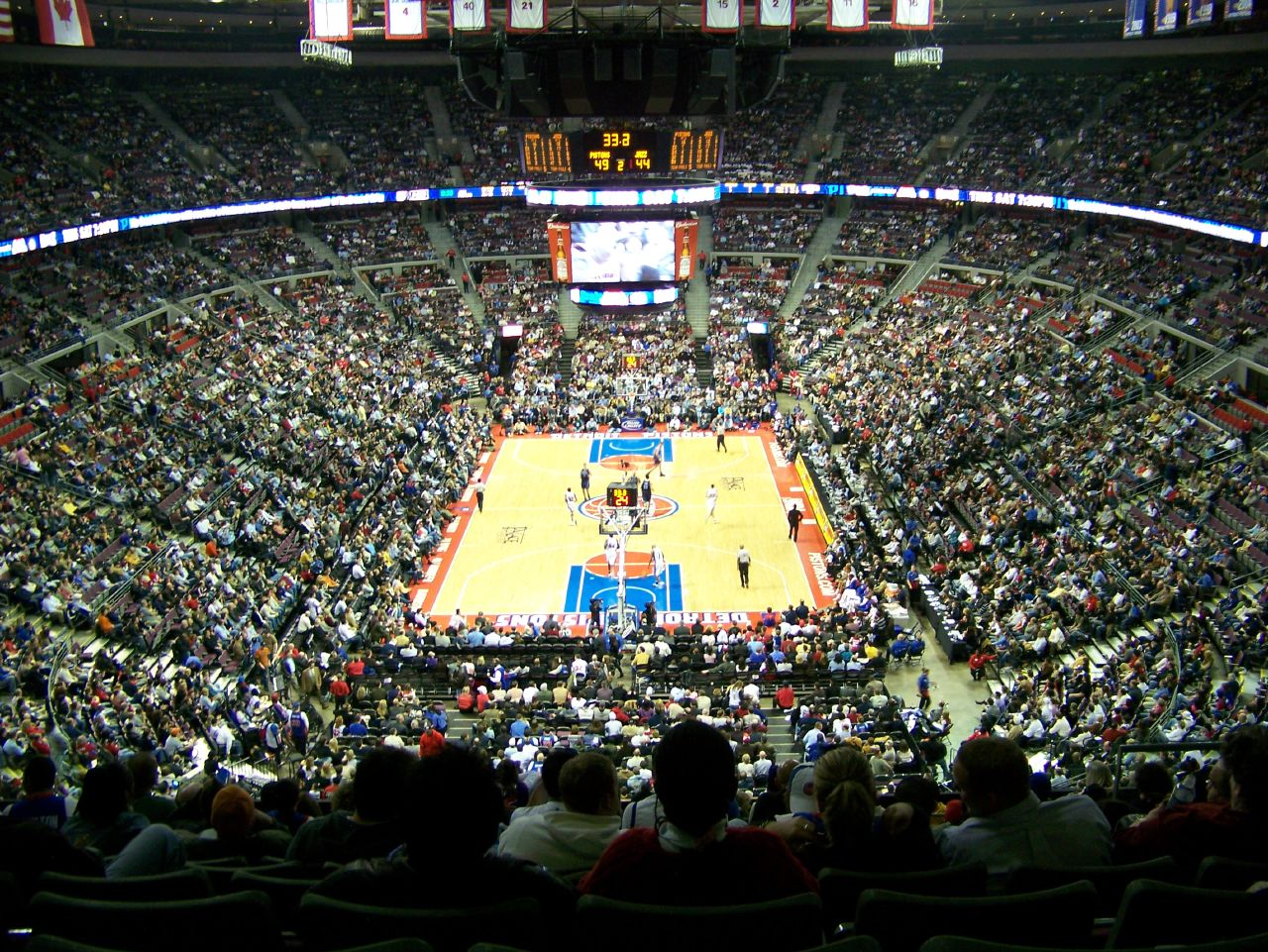
The Palace of Auburn Hills

Auburn Hills roughly follows the course of Interstate 75 and is home to a prosperous business community. In the early 1980s, Oakland University partnered with developers to create a technology and research park. The Oakland Technology Park was approved by the city in 1985, with Comerica, EDS, and Chrysler to build campuses there. The city's many tech and office buildings host 80,000 people during the workday.

Great Lakes Crossing Outlets, an enclosed super-regional outlet shopping mall, opened November 12, 1998.

In 2002, the area at Auburn and Squirrel was revitalized as the "Village Center" with streetscape improvements. Pedestrian-friendly development is encouraged in this district now known simply as Downtown Auburn Hills. At the end of 2013, a number of large projects were completed Downtown, including a four-story graduate student apartment complex, a 233-space parking deck, an auxiliary classroom space for schools and colleges called the University Center and the Downtown Educational Nook (DEN), a refurbished historic log cabin acting as a student and community center.

Auburn Hills is home to PHINIA, BorgWarner, Guardian Industries, Autoliv, RGIS, Joyson Safety Systems, the Americas headquarters of GKN Driveline, the North American headquarters of Faurecia, Volkswagen/Audi North American Headquarters, and until its demolition, The Palace of Auburn Hills, the former home of the National Basketball Association's Detroit Pistons and the former home of Women's National Basketball Association's Detroit Shock.

In 2017, Maserati announced it was moving its U.S. headquarters from Englewood Cliffs, New Jersey to the former Walter P. Chrysler Museum in Auburn Hills.

== Education ==
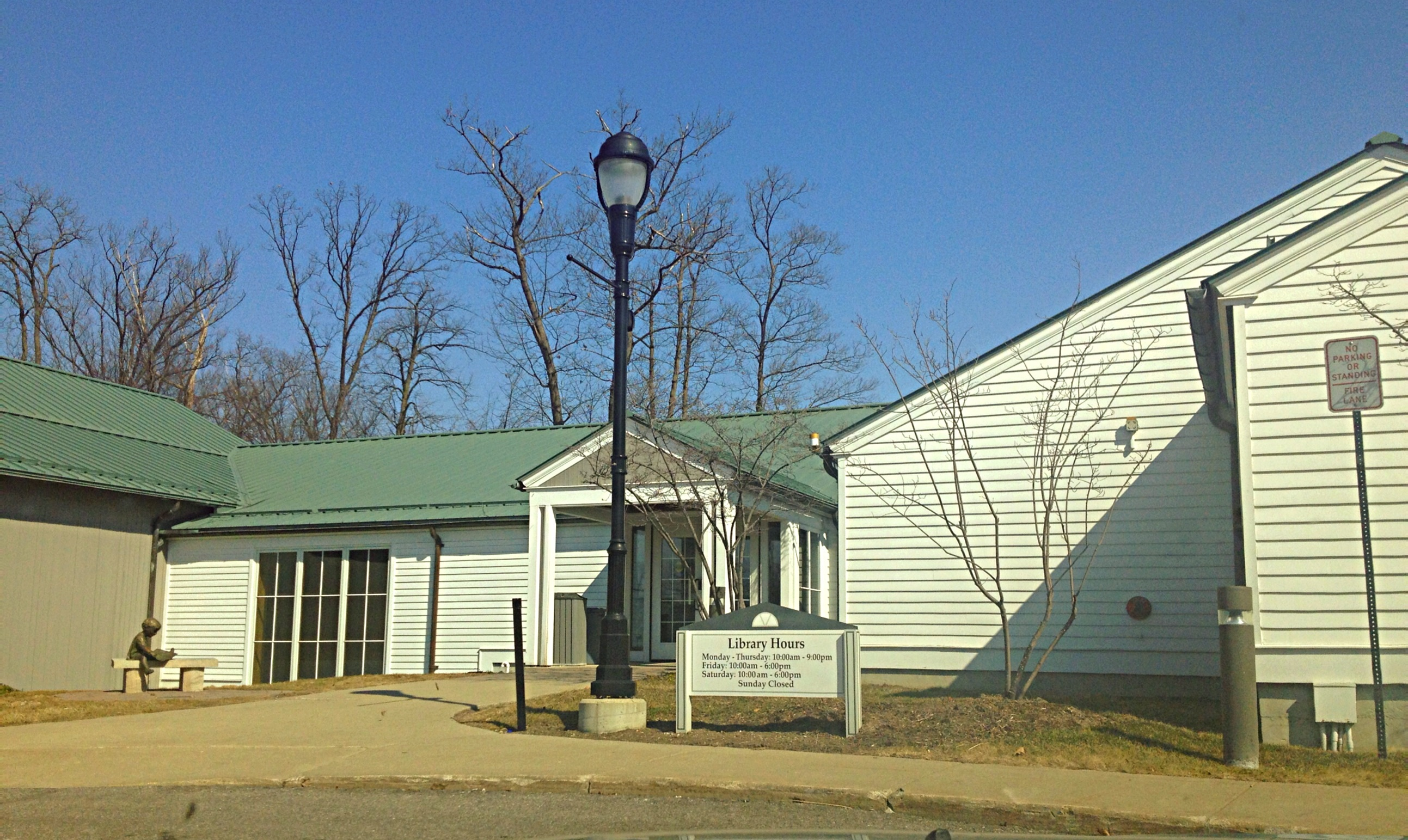
Auburn Hills Public Library

=== Primary and secondary schools ===
School districts serving sections of Auburn Hills include Avondale School District, Pontiac School District, and Rochester Community Schools.

The Avondale School District operates two elementary schools in the city limits: R. Grant Graham Elementary School and Auburn Elementary School. Portions of Auburn Hills in ASD are zoned to these schools. All ASD residents are zoned to Avondale Middle School in Rochester Hills and Avondale High School in Auburn Hills. Other ASD facilities in Auburn Hills include the district administrative offices and Avondale Montessori. A Pontiac school district school, Will Rogers Elementary School, is located in northeastern Auburn Hills.

Private schools in Auburn Hills include:

- Auburn Hills Christian School
- Oakland Christian School

Private schools near Auburn Hills:

- Notre Dame Preparatory/Marist Academy, Pontiac
- Holy Family Regional School (HFRS) - Consists of a grade PK-3 North Campus in Rochester and a 4-8 South Campus in Rochester Hills. Two churches in Auburn Hills designate HFRS as the parish school: St. John Fisher Chapel and Sacred Heart of the Hills. The first two sponsored the school from the beginning and the other three joined later, with Sacred Heart being the final one.

=== Higher education ===
The main campus of Oakland University sits within Auburn Hills. Oakland Community College is also situated in Auburn Hills.

== Parks and recreation ==
Auburn Hills is home to several local parks, many of which are open year-round.

Auburn Hills Skate Park

A skateboard, inline skate and BMX bike park open to all ages and skill levels. The use of the facility is always free and it remains open from April to November, 8 a.m. until dusk.

Civic Center Park

Popular hiking and walking attraction with numerous nature trails. A fishing pond and picnic area are also available for public use. The park offers open lawn areas and a picnic shelter with a fireplace inside. The park features a softball field, 9-hole disc golf course, tennis courts, two play structures, and swings.

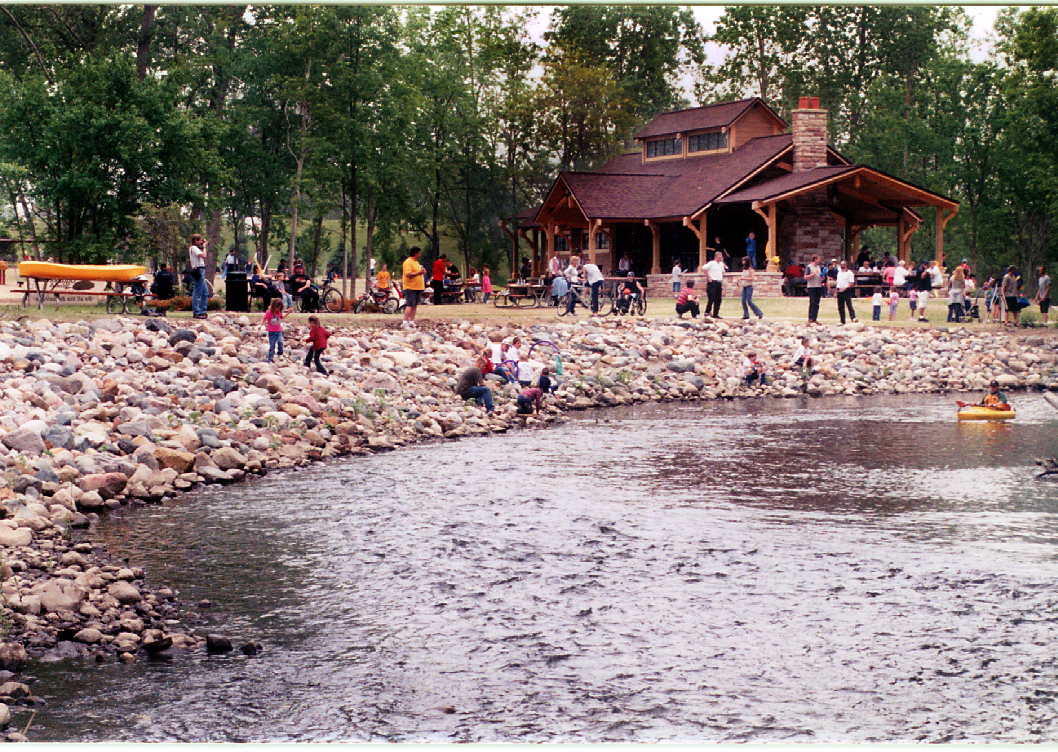
River Woods Park

Clinton River Trail

An expansive, 16-mile (26 km) walkway through the heart of Oakland County. The trail cuts through several different cities, including Rochester, Rochester Hills, Sylvan Lake, Auburn Hills, and Pontiac. The 2.1-mile (3.4 km) section of trail within Auburn Hills is covered in finely crushed stone, ideal for walking, jogging and biking.

Dennis Dearing Jr. Memorial Park

Featuring a fireman-themed "tot-lot" for children ages 2–5, Dennis Dearing Jr. Memorial Park is a popular spot for families with children. The park also has swings, picnic tables and open space areas for picnic or play.

Manitoba Park

A two-acre park which contains a play structure, sand volleyball courts, a paved play area and open space for activities.

Riverside Park

Located adjacent to downtown Auburn Hills and along the Clinton River, Riverside Park is a popular spot during the warmer months. A canoe launch is open during the warm season.

River Woods Park

Located near downtown Auburn Hills, this park has picnic areas, both open and sheltered, standing barbecue grills and heated restrooms which remain open year-round. Visitors can navigate through the park on a paved pathway system, which includes a bridge over the Clinton River. The park also contains four basketball courts and play structures.

== Notable people ==
- Paul Haynes, former professional basketball player
- Tom McMillin, member of the Michigan State Board of Education and former mayor of Auburn Hills
- John Morton, professional football coach
- Mary Jo Sanders, former professional boxer
- Nick Whiteside, professional football player

== See also ==
- Walter P. Chrysler Museum
