= Avondale Bridge =

Avondale Bridge may refer to:

- Avondale Bridge (Arkansas River)
- Avondale Bridge (Passaic River)
