= Aven (company) =

Finance and technology company

Aven Holdings, Inc.
- Type: Private
- Industry: Financial technology
- Founded: 2019; 7 years ago
- Founders: Sadi Khan; Murtada Shah; Collin Wikman
- Headquarters: Campbell, California, United States
- Key people: Sadi Khan (CEO); Murtada Shah (Head of Operations); Collin Wikman (Head of Design)
- Products: Asset-backed loans; Home equity line of credit (HELOC); Home equity loan; Mortgage refinancing; Credit cards; Personal finance software
- Number of employees: 80 (2026)
- Website: aven.com

Aven Holdings, Inc., commonly known as Aven, is an American financial technology company headquartered in Campbell, California. Founded in 2019, by Sadi Khan, Murtada Shah, and Collin Wikman, the company specializes in asset-backed lending, home equity lines of credit, home equity loans, mortgage refinancing, bitcoin-backed loans, rewards credit cards, and personal finance software.

Aven is known for a home equity line of credit that can also be used as a credit card. The card offers lower interest rates than typical credit cards and, unlike traditional home equity lines of credit, provides cash back on purchases.

As of 2026, Aven operates across the United States and primarily serves borrowers with high credit scores.

== History ==
Sadi Khan, Murtada Shah, and Collin Wikman founded Aven in 2019 to help homeowners reduce the interest they pay on their debt. While researching ideas for a new startup, they discovered inefficiencies in consumer borrowing, including a large difference between the average interest rate, or APR, for credit cards and home equity lines of credit (HELOC) and the long underwriting process to get approved for a HELOC.

Khan, Shah, and Wikman created a new type of credit card called the Aven Home Card, which they launched in 2022. The Aven Home Card is backed by a HELOC, as opposed to the unsecured debt of a traditional credit card. It combines the low rates of a HELOC with the fast application process and cash-back rewards typical of a credit card.

Aven expanded into mortgage refinancing, including cash-out refinances, in September 2025.

As of 2025, Aven has raised $390 million in venture-capital financing from investors, including Caffeinated Capital, Electric Capital, Founders Fund, General Catalyst, The General Partnership, GIC, and Khosla Ventures. Its last publicly reported valuation was $2.2 billion in September 2025.

In January 2026, Aven announced it had contributed funding to support the creation of a Santa Clara, California-based de novo federal credit union, Haven Federal Credit Union. The initiative was described by Aven CEO Sadi Khan as part of the company's mission to lower borrowing costs for consumers, particularly homeowners. Haven Federal Credit Union received its federal charter from the National Credit Union Administration in December 2025 and is only one of three charters granted in 2025. The credit union operates independently from Aven and is member-owned, but Khan and another Aven employee were reported to have been appointed to its board of directors.

In April 2026, Aven introduced the Aven Bitcoin Visa Card, a bitcoin-backed line of credit and the company's first asset-backed credit card not backed by home equity. The card allows someone to borrow up to $1 million against their bitcoin holdings without having to sell the underlying digital asset pledged as collateral.

== Business model ==
Aven uses automation, data, and technology to process, evaluate, and approve loans. The company says its automation and technology lowers its operating costs, which it can then pass onto consumers as lower interest rates for its credit products. Aven also invented and patented a robotic arm to support remote online notarizations to help make processing its HELOC application faster. According to the loan provider, its application can be completed in minutes, and approved borrowers typically receive their credit cards within one week.

Aven's customers are primarily high-earners with an income of more than $100,000 and “prime” or “super-prime” borrowers with FICO credit scores of 720 or more.

Aven is a financial technology company and not a bank. It does not have a bank charter and works with Coastal Community Bank, a Washington state-chartered bank, to provide loans to consumers. The company funds its loans through a partner bank and raising capital from investors through a loan securitization program.

== Products and services ==
Aven offers asset-based credit products, including a HELOC-backed credit card, a traditional home equity line of credit, home equity loans, and a bitcoin-backed line of credit. The company provides access to a credit line using a homeowner's home equity or bitcoin as collateral.

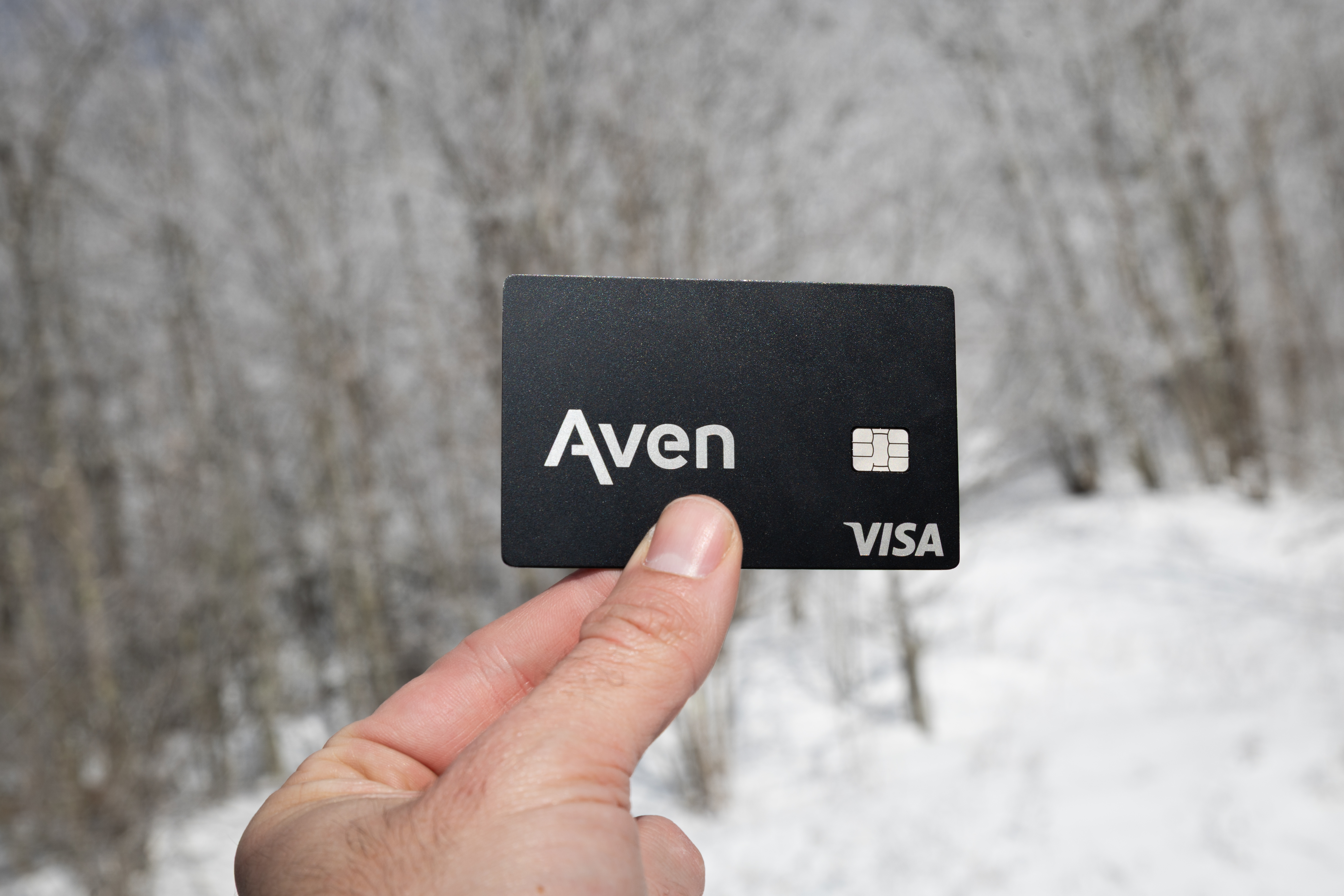

The Aven Home Card is structured as a HELOC with credit limits ranging from $5,000 to $400,000. The credit card operates on the Visa network and earns cash back on purchases. Borrowers can also cash out funds to a personal bank account, similar to withdrawals from a traditional home equity loan or HELOC.

In addition to home equity-backed credit products, Aven offers a bitcoin-backed loan product. In April 2026, the company launched the Aven Bitcoin Visa Card, a bitcoin-backed line of credit that allows a bitcoin holder to borrow against their bitcoin without selling the asset. The product works similar to the company's home equity-backed credit cards, but uses cryptocurrency as the underlying collateral instead. The card provides access to a credit line of up to $1 million and includes fixed-rate and fixed-term borrowing options with terms of up to 10 years. Interest rates depend on the loan-to-value ratio of the deposited bitcoin and not a borrower's credit score. The bitcoin collateral is held by the cryptocurrency custodian BitGo. According to Forbes and The Block, the product was positioned as an alternative to traditional bitcoin-backed loans, which typically offer shorter repayment terms and higher interest rates.

Aven also offers a standard rewards credit card that is not backed by a borrower's home or other assets. The Aven Rewards Visa Card provides cash back on purchases. Rewards are earned as points and can be redeemed as statement credits or for travel and hotel bookings through the company's travel portal.

As of 2026, Aven has issued more than $4 billion in loans to more than 75,000 borrowers since launching in 2020.

The company also has a free personal finance app called Aven Advisor, which helps consumers track their spending, consumer debts, and net worth.

== See also ==
- Home equity line of credit
- Asset-backed lending
- Secured loan
- Housing in the United States
