= Achrimsdale =

Coordinates: 58.03°N 03.86°W

Achrimsdale: Scottish Gaelic: Achadh Rumasdail
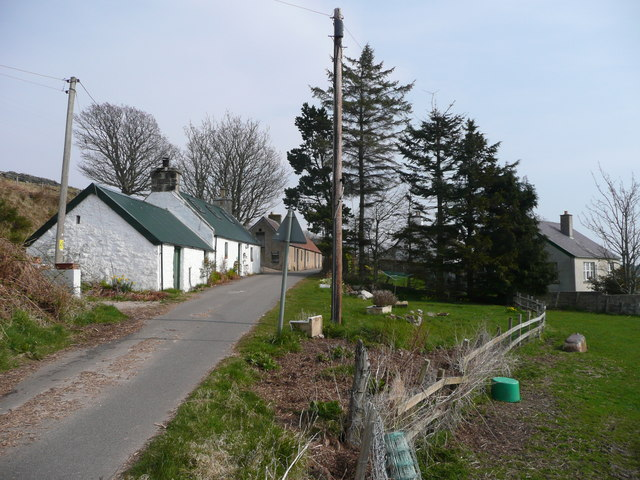
- Achrimsdale

- Location within the Sutherland area
- OS grid reference: NC9006
- Council area: Highland
- Lieutenancy area: Sutherland
- Country: Scotland
- Sovereign state: United Kingdom
- Police: Scotland
- Fire: Scottish
- Ambulance: Scottish

Achrimsdale (Scottish Gaelic: Achadh Rumasdail) is a village in Highland, Scotland.
