= Avonmore =

Avonmore may refer to:

== Places ==
=== Canada ===
- Avonmore, North Stormont, Ontario
- Avonmore, Edmonton, a neighborhood in Edmonton, Alberta

=== Ireland ===
- Avonmore, County Cork
- River Avonmore in County Wicklow

=== United Kingdom ===
- Avonmore (ward) in London

=== United States ===
- Avonmore, Pennsylvania

== Music ==
- Avonmore (Bryan Ferry album), 2014

== Other ==
- Viscount Avonmore, a title of nobility
- Avonmore, an Irish dairy cooperative later merged into Tirlán
- Avonmore, a nitrate clipper (windjammer) sunk at the storm at Huanillos in 1877
