= Workingmen's Benevolent Association of Schuylkill County =

19th-century US labor organization

The Workingmen's Benevolent Association was a 19th-century labor organization that consisted mainly of coal miners. It was organized in 1868 in Schuylkill County, Pennsylvania, with John Siney as president. In 1869, the organization called a strike of coal-miners from May 5 to June 16. There were some gains resulting from the strike. The union was organized in an area of alleged Molly Maguires activity.

Strikes were called in 1868, 1869, and 1871. Two unarmed strikers were shot and killed in Scranton during the 1871 strike by mine owners' guards.

== The organization is transformed into a national entity ==
John Siney also headed the Miners' and Laborers' Benevolent Association. The Miners' and Laborers' Benevolent Association was formed in 1870, and in 1872 it became a national union in the bituminous fields of Pennsylvania, Maryland, Ohio, Kentucky, West Virginia and Michigan. The Miners' and Laborers' Benevolent Association was crushed in 1875. Pennsylvania Industrialist Franklin B. Gowen forced a strike in January 1875 that came to be known as the Long Strike. The strike lasted six months, and resulted in the destruction of the union.

== Predecessor ==
An earlier organization, the Workingmen's Benevolent Society of Carbon County, was organized in the Schuylkill region in 1864. The Workingmen's Benevolent Association was the name under which the anthracite coal fields were organized. In 1870 the Pennsylvania state legislature gave the society a charter (as a labor union) and the name was changed to the Miners and Laborers’ Benevolent Association, but it continued to be called, except officially, by its prior name—the Workingmen's Benevolent Association.
