= Suladale =

Coordinates: 57.49159°N 6.37816°W

Suladale: Scottish Gaelic: Sùladal
- Location within the Isle of Skye
- OS grid reference: NG377530
- Council area: Highland
- Country: Scotland
- Sovereign state: United Kingdom
- Post town: Portree
- Postcode district: IV51 9
- Police: Scotland
- Fire: Scottish
- Ambulance: Scottish

Suladale or Suledale (Scottish Gaelic: Sùladal) is a small mixed crofting hamlet of fewer than a dozen houses, located near Edinbane, on the north of the island of Skye, in the Highlands of Scotland and is in the Scottish council area of Highland.

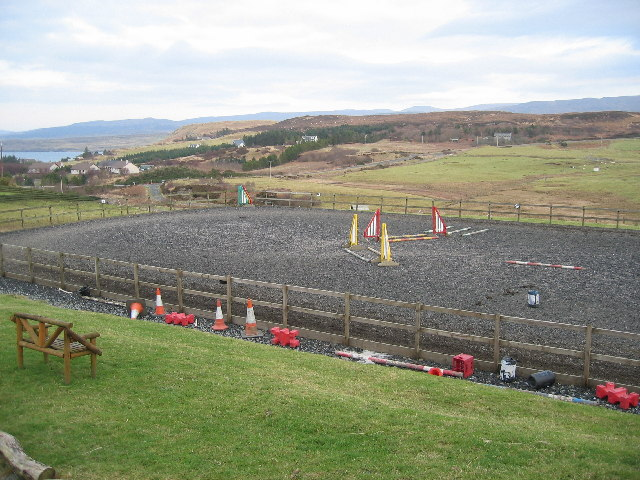
Skye Riding Centre, overlooking Suladale
