= HMS Avon =

Six ships of the Royal Navy have borne the name HMS Avon. Avon comes from a Brythonic word meaning "river".

- HMS Avon (1805) was an 18-gun Cruizer-class brig-sloop launched in 1805. In 1814 she was sunk in action with the American Wasp in the English Channel.
- HMS Avon (1837) was a 2-gun wooden paddle package ship transferred from the GPO to the Royal Navy in 1837. From 1843 she was used as a survey ship and she was sold in 1863.
- HMS Avon (1862) was a 1-gun wooden paddle gunboat purchased in 1862. She was used in the New Zealand Wars and was sold in 1865 as a coal hulk. She later became the civilian vessel Clyde.
- HMS Avon (1867) was a 4-gun composite screw gun vessel launched in 1867. She was sold in 1890.
- HMS Avon (1896) was a destroyer launched in 1896. She was sold in 1920.
- HMS Avon (K97) was a River-class frigate launched in 1943. She was handed over to the Portuguese Navy in 1949 where she was renamed Nuno Tristao. She was broken up in 1970.
