= Cwmavon =

Cwmavon may refer to:

- Cwmavon, Torfaen, a small village in Monmouthshire, Wales
- Cwmavon, Neath Port Talbot, a large village in Wales
- Cwmavon RFC, a rugby union club based in Cwmavon, Wales
