= Palmdale (disambiguation) =

Palmdale is an incorporated city in Los Angeles County and California's 2nd largest desert city, after Lancaster, California.

Palmdale may also refer to:

== Places ==
Australia

- Palmdale, New South Wales, a suburb on the Central Coast of New South Wales
- Palmdale, Western Australia, a locality of the City of Albany

United States

- Palmdale, Florida, an unincorporated area in Glades County, near Lake Okeechobee
- Palmdale, Minnesota, an unincorporated area in Chisago County, near the Wisconsin state line
- Palmdale, Pennsylvania, an unincorporated area in Dauphin County, near Hershey
- Palmdale, California, a city in Los Angeles County, near Santa Clarita

== Airports ==
- Palmdale Regional Airport, a commercial passenger airport in Palmdale, California
- Plant 42, a military installation in Palmdale, California

== Music ==
- "Palmdale", from the album Sell Your Dope by Afroman
- Palmdale, a band formed in 2010 by Kay Hanley and Kevin Dotson
