= Avon Township =

Avon Township may refer to

- Avon Township, Lake County, Illinois
- Avon Township, Coffey County, Kansas
- Avon Township, Sumner County, Kansas, in Sumner County, Kansas
- Avon Township, Michigan, now Rochester Hills
- Avon Township, Stearns County, Minnesota
- Avon Township, North Dakota, in Grand Forks County, North Dakota
