= Sordale =

Coordinates: 58.53901°N 3.46876°W

Sordale: Scottish Gaelic: Suardal
- Location within the Caithness area
- OS grid reference: ND145621
- Council area: Highland
- Lieutenancy area: Caithness
- Country: Scotland
- Sovereign state: United Kingdom
- Post town: Halkirk
- Postcode district: KW12 6
- Police: Scotland
- Fire: Scottish
- Ambulance: Scottish
- UK Parliament: Caithness, Sutherland and Easter Ross
- Scottish Parliament: Caithness, Sutherland and Ross constituency in the Highlands and Islands electoral region

Sordale is a small linear village, located 1.5 miles (2.4 km) northeast in Halkirk, in Caithness, Scottish Highlands, and is in the Scottish council area of Highland. The small hamlet of Shalmstry can be found to the north of the village.
