= Avondale (Columbus, Georgia) =

- U.S. National Register of Historic Places
- Location: Columbus, Georgia
- Coordinates: 32°27′33″N 84°58′3″W
- Architect: Multiple
- Architectural style: Italianate
- NRHP reference No.: 78000995
- Added to NRHP: June 2, 1978

Avondale is a neighborhood in south-central Columbus, Georgia located adjacent to and southeast of the central business district in Downtown. It has been a part of the federally recognized Columbus Historic Riverfront Industrial District since 1978. In recent years, the area has experienced an influx of residents and new businesses. It is generally categorized as the area bound by Buena Vista Road and Wynnton Road to the north, 21st Avenue to the south, Brown Avenue to the east, and 10th Ave to the west. In 2009, the estimated population of the area was 3,326.
