= Avondale Colliery =

Mine in United States of America

Coordinates: 41.2238°N 75.9797°W

- Founded: Mid-1800s
- Defunct: Circa late 1960s
- Fate: Site of the Avondale Mine Disaster in 1869
- Headquarters: Plymouth Township, Luzerne County, Pennsylvania, United States
- Products: Anthracite coal
- Owner: Delaware, Lackawanna and Western Railroad Company

The Avondale Colliery was a coal mine in Plymouth Township, Luzerne County, nearly two miles northeast of Nanticoke, Pennsylvania. The mine was considered to be "one of the best and worst" operating in Pennsylvania's Wyoming Valley.

This colliery was the site of the Avondale Mine Disaster in 1869, which took the lives of one hundred and eight miners and two volunteer rescuers.

== History ==
Opened in northeastern Pennsylvania during the mid-1800s, the Avondale Colliery was an anthracite coal mine located in the Luzerne County community of Avondale. Leased by J. C. Phelps, a businessman from Wilkes-Barre, Pennsylvania on June 13, 1863 from Henderson Gaylord, William C. Reynolds and others, the mine's first entrance was a one-thousand-foot horizontal tunnel which failed to strike a new vein of anthracite. A second shaft was then tunneled out at a depth of two hundred and thirty-seven feet and cost of $2,000 per yard, which ultimate did locate a new vein.

The colliery's management was transferred to the Steuben Coal Company in January 1866. Soon after, Steuben Coal merged with the Nanticoke Coal & Iron Company, which subsequently erected a new breaker to separate coal from the rock where it was mined. The new owners chose to build their new breaker directly above the Avondale Colliery's single shaft in 1867. That construction practice, which was standard for industry operations during that era, was employed to improve ventilation for miners by allowing small fires to burn at the bottom of the shaft which created an air-circulating draft.

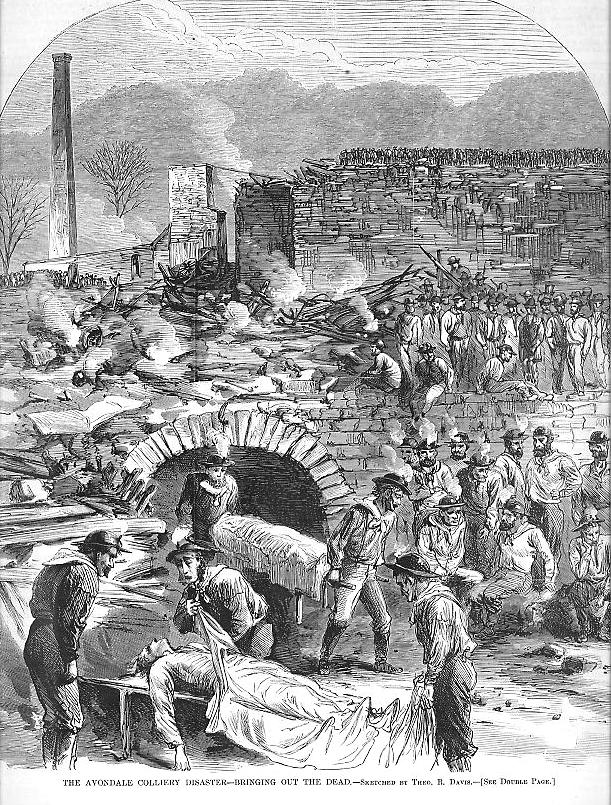
Harper's Weekly's September 25, 1869 illustration of the Avondale mine disaster

Two years later, miners at the colliery engaged in a seven-day strike against the mine's operator, the Delaware, Lackawanna and Western Railroad Company, in late August and early September of 1869. On the miners' first day back at work (September 6), at approximately 10:00 a.m., the practice of using a small, bottom-of-the-shaft fire to circulate air led to tragedy when timbers in the shaft caught fire, spread to the surface and engulfed the breaker, blocking off the only exit for miners who were trapped underground. As the fire burned up the miners' oxygen supply, carbon monoxide overwhelmed the miners, asphyxiating one hundred and eight men and boys, as well as two men attempting a rescue. Rescue teams were unable to reach the victims for two days.

== Description of the Mine ==
Shortly after the disaster at the colliery in September 1869, Philadelphia's Daily Evening Bulletin and the Lancaster Intelligencer described the mine's construction as follows:

"The masonry work, running down the shaft some twenty feet, was as strong as stone and cement could make it. The engine-house was firmly built, the machinery of the finest kind used in the colliery business; the breaker, that covered the engine-house, and through which the broken coal was despatched through a long shute to the railroad track below, was built in the most substantial manner, and altogether the works to the casual observer seemed to leave no room for improvement. The shaft was sunk to a depth of 237 feet, with a space twenty-six feet by twelve, divided in the centre by a wooden partition, on one side of which the pure air descended to the mine, and on the other the impure vapors ascended to the top, and were dissipated abroad. After going in a sheer descent to the bottom of this shaft, the explorer of the mine found on either hand two long galleries, or avenues, one branching east 1,200 feet, and the other west 800 feet. Moving straight onward at right angles to the shaft, and at a distance from it of 220 feet, the furnace for creating a draught of air through the galleries and chambers of the mine might be found blazing away in dangerous proximity to the wooodwork lining of the passage-way reserved for the admission of the fresh air currents."

The American Volunteer of Carlisle, Pennsylvania presented this description:

"The mine consists of two great gangways; styled the east and west planes. The east plane extends 800 feet, and the west plane 1200 feet. Besides these there were numerous chambers which can only be reached by very circuitous passages. Parallel with each gangway is an air passage, and at intervals of 50 feet connections are made with the main gangway.
Two hundred feet from the shaft is a furnace which, unfortunately, was used for keeping up the draft for ventilating the mine, instead of a fan, which is most common. Over the mouth of the shaft was built the engine-room, where the force was applied for raising the coal which had been mined. This was a large affair, several stories in height, and connected with a large breaker, two hundred feet long and eighty feet wide, and two stories high."

== Later years ==
Following the disaster in 1869, the Avondale Colliery continued to operate. During the spring of 1897, The Scranton Tribune reported that the mine was "threatened with total destruction" and abandonment as it began to sink below the soil level of the Susquehanna River, which caused fissures in sections of the mine that were gradually weakened, and then penetrated, by the river's pressure.

The Avondale Colliery was one of two that flooded in May 1897. It was idled for months due to problems in pumping the water out of the mineshaft and adjoining areas. Both collieries were ultimately saved, and Avondale was back to producing 41,000 tons of coal per year by the winter of 1899.

Still owned and operated by the Delaware, Lackawanna and Western Railroad Company in the early 1900s, the company's work practices were again called into question during the winter of 1902 when the company informed firemen and engineers employed at Avondale that they would be required to "adopt the new rules promulgated ... whereby one shift goes on duty at 7 p.m. and work[s] until 5 p.m., when it would be relieved by the other set [of miners], which in turn would be relieved at midnight by the men who quit at 5 o'clock." The colliery was subsequently idled when the employees affected by the rule change refused to participate in the new work schedule and were fired. The United Mine Workers, of District No. 1, threatened to strike in response to the company's treatment of the firemen.

During the summer of that same year, the colliery reportedly employed a large number of men in mining a fresh vein of coal.
