= Avondale School District =

Public school district in Michigan, United States

Address
- 2940 Waukegan Street Auburn Hills, Michigan, 48326; United States

District information
- Grades: Pre-Kindergarten-12
- Superintendent: James Schwarz
- School board: Avondale Board of Education
- Schools: 9
- Budget: $77,848,000 2022-2023 expenditures
- NCES District ID: 2603690

Students and staff
- Students: 3,870 (2024-2025)
- Teachers: 256.51 (on an FTE basis) (2024-2025)
- Staff: 581.13 FTE (2024-2025)
- Student–teacher ratio: 15.09 (2024-2025)

Other information
- Website: www.avondaleschools.org

Avondale School District is a public school district in Metro Detroit in the U.S. state of Michigan, serving portions of Auburn Hills, Bloomfield Township, Rochester Hills, and Troy.

== History ==
The district is derived from Auburn Heights Rural Agricultural School District, which formed in 1947 from the consolidation of the following primary school districts: Auburn Heights, Stone, Stiles, and Elmwood. The name Avondale may have been inspired by Avondale Park, a subdivision on Auburn Road in what was formerly Avon Township. In a naming contest, four students chose the name Avondale and each received $10.

Avondale High School was first operated within the Auburn Heights school building at the southwest corner of Squirrel and Waukegan in 1937. A new high school was constructed in 1951 on Auburn Road between Crooks Road and Livernois Road. This building became a middle school when the present high school opened in 1970.

By 1953, overcrowding beset the district, with one teacher reporting having 56 students. By 1954, the district was using several churches to help house its 2,304 students. The district accommodated the growth by building a junior high school and requesting a bond issue in 1955.

The district constructed R. Grant Graham Elementary School in 1968.

In 1979, facing a budget deficit and declining enrollment, the district closed Stone Elementary, followed by Elmwood Elementary in 1981. In 1981 Avondale's annual budget was projected to be $6.9 million ($24 million in 2024 dollars). The junior high school also closed in 1979 and the building was ultimately used to house the Auburn Heights Elementary, when it changed its name to Auburn Elementary, around 1987. The original Auburn Heights Elementary, built in 1924, has been demolished.

The district was seeing growth again in the 1990s and built Deerfield Elementary in 1990 and Woodland Elementary in 1998, which replaced the Stiles Elementary building.

With the construction of a new Avondale Middle School in 1994, the 1951 high school building was named Avondale Meadows Upper Elementary and housed grades 5 and 6. It closed in 2010 due to state budget cuts and became a multipurpose building for the district.

== Schools ==
List of schools in Avondale School District
School	Address	Notes
Avondale High School	2800 Waukegan St., Auburn Hills	Built 1970.
Avondale GATE Magnet School	1435 W. Auburn Rd., Rochester Hills	Built 1951. Formerly high school, middle school, and Meadows Upper Elementary. Individualized program for gifted students in grades 2-8.
Avondale Middle School	1445 W. Auburn Rd., Rochester Hills	Grades 6-8
Auburn Elementary	2900 Waukegan St., Auburn Hills	Grades K-5. Built 1955. Originally Avondale Junior High, building substantially reconstructed.
Deerfield Elementary	3600 Crooks Rd., Rochester Hills	Grades K-5.
R. Grant Graham Elementary	2450 Old Salem Road, Auburn Hills	Grades K-5. Built 1968.
Woodland Elementary	6465 Livernois Road, Troy	Grades K-5. Built 1998 to replace Stiles Elementary.

== Former schools ==
=== Auburn Academy ===
Auburn Academy was begun in 1837 as a tuition-based school educating students in the village of Auburn, later called Auburn Heights. It was built on the corner of Primary Street and Juniper Street. Although it is not linked to the current district, it represents education in the community during the pioneer era.

=== Stiles School ===
The city of Rochester Hills created a historic district for Stiles School in 2010 because of its exemplary Collegiate Gothic architecture. It was built at 3976 S Livernois Rd., Rochester Hills (then Avon Township) in 1929 by architect Frederick D. Madison, replacing a series of one-room schoolhouses (the earliest being from 1871). Its school district was Fractional School District No. 11 of Avon and Troy Townships. The kindergarten room has murals depicting nursery-rhymes and a fireplace surrounded by Flint Faience animal-themed tiles. After Woodland Elementary replaced it in 1998, it housed a series of private schools.

=== Stone School ===
Stone Elementary was built in 1929 at 3741 S Adams Rd in Rochester Hills, replacing an 1857 one-room schoolhouse at the southeast corner of Adams and South Boulevard in Troy (which is still standing) known locally as the Old Stone School. This was the school of Fractional School District 10, of Troy Township. The 1857 schoolhouse is a Greek Revival structure made of local fieldstone, hence the name. After the 1929 elementary closed in 1979, it became American House Stone, a retirement community.

=== Elmwood School ===
Built in 1926 at 2251 W Auburn Road, in Rochester Hills, Elmwood was closed by the district in June 1981 during a budget crisis. Like Stone Elementary, Elmwood Elementary was purchased by American House after it closed in 1981. It is now a retirement community.
