= Stockport Academy =

Location
- Heathbank Road; Cheadle Heath; Stockport, Greater Manchester, SK3 0UP; United Kingdom; 53.39987°N 2.18374°W

Information
- Type: Academy
- Motto: The Best in Everyone
- Established: 2007
- Local authority: Stockport
- Trust: United Learning and United Church Schools Trust
- Department for Education URN: 135262 Tables
- Principal: Janine McCann
- Gender: Coeducational
- Age: 11 to 16
- Enrolment: 869 (February 2019)
- Website: www.stockport-academy.org

Stockport Academy is a non-selective co-educational school within the English Academy programme, located in Cheadle Heath, Stockport, Greater Manchester. It caters for children aged 11–16 and has approximately 1,300 pupils on roll.

== History ==
Avondale High School served the area until its closure in August 2007. Stockport Academy took its place in September 2007, moving into a new building on the same site in 2008. While Avondale operated as a community school, Stockport Academy is run by United Learning, formerly the United Church Schools Trust. The school is non-denominational, but follows the Christian (specifically, Church of England) ethos of its parent organisation.

== Academics ==
The academy has chosen to run a three year Key Stage 3; it is moving to a system in Years 7 and 8, initially in English and Maths only of monitoring performance against targets (key performance indicators). At Key Stage 4, the school helps the student choose an appropriate pathway. Generally they encourage the student to access a broad curriculum by considering all subjects including Languages, Humanities and Computer Science alongside the other core and practical subjects, citing the wishes of employers and universities. These will include the English Baccalaureate suite of subjects; English, Maths, Science, Language, History or Geography.

The school selects students for the oversubscribed courses by considering their attendance (the higher better), current effort and performance, the number of negative behaviour points has gained (the lower the better). Attendance at relevant Key Stage 3 enrichment clubs and contribution to wider school life (charity work etc.).

=== Ofsted Report ===
In March 2015, Ofsted recognized Stockport Academy as a Good school, with Outstanding features. Highlights of the report included recognition that the behavior of students is "impeccable" and students have "total confidence that they are well cared for". Other findings in the report include the recognition that students "achieve well" and teachers have "high expectations and aspirations" for their students.

An inspection in 2018 confirmed the school remains good and recommendations have been followed.

== Alumni ==
- Angela Rayner (born 1980), politician, Deputy Prime Minister of the United Kingdom from 2024 until her resignation on 5 September 2025.

== See also ==
- List of schools in Stockport
