= Avondale High School (Michigan) =

Location
- 2800 Waukegan Street; Auburn Hills, Michigan 48326; United States; 42°37′42″N 83°13′54″W

Information
- Type: Public high school
- School district: Avondale School District
- Superintendent: James Schwarz
- Principal: Doug Wilson
- Teaching staff: 52.01 (on an FTE basis)
- Grades: 9-12
- Enrollment: 911 (2024-2025)
- Student to teacher ratio: 17.52
- Colors: Purple and gold
- Athletics conference: Oakland Activities Association
- Nickname: Yellow Jackets
- Accreditation: Cognia
- Website: www.avondaleschools.org/schools/high-school

Avondale High School is a public high school in Auburn Hills, Michigan, United States. It serves grades 9–12 for the Avondale School District.

== History ==
The Auburn Heights School, located at the southwest corner of Waukegan Street and Squirrel Road, housed the first high school in the area as of 1937. (Note: This school was originally built in 1924 and housed all grades up to eight.) Population growth led to a merger in 1947 with other elementary school districts, creating Avondale School District. A new high school, which included a junior high school, opened in 1951 at 1435 West Auburn Road in Rochester Hills.

The student-run radio station WAHS 89.5 FM was established in 1975.

The school hosted a rally by first lady Betty Ford in 1976.

== Facilities ==
Avondale High School was built in 1970 by the architecture firm Linn Smith, Demiene and Adams, replacing the 1951 building. The additions of the pool and auditorium were made in 1973. The auditorium was considered "the most outstanding such high school facility in the state." The building received major additions and renovations in 1999, when the fieldhouse was built.

== Academics ==
Student assessments
- 2021–22 school year Change vs. prior year

M-STEP 11th grade proficiency rates (Science / Social Studies)
- Advanced %: 12.4 / 7.0
- Proficient %: 21.6 / 19.5
- PR. Proficient %: 17.8 / 52.4
- Not Proficient %: 48.1 / 21.1

Average test scores
- SAT Total: 924.6 (▼ −98.1)

Avondale High School has been accredited by Cognia or its predecessors since 1954. U.S. News & World Report ranked Avondale 247th in Michigan and 7,332nd nationally in their 2020 annual survey of public high schools.

== Demographics ==
The demographic breakdown of the 989 students enrolled for 2023–24 was:

- Male - 51.2%
- Female - 48%
- Native American/Alaskan - 0.2%
- Asian - 6.0%
- Black - 35.5%
- Hispanic - 15.5%
- Native Hawaiian/Pacific islanders - 0.3%
- White - 38.4%
- Multiracial - 4.1%

Students eligible for free or reduced-cost lunch - 46.7%.

== Athletics ==
Avondale's Yellow Jackets compete in the Oakland Activities Association. The school colors are purple and gold. The following Michigan High School Athletic Association (MHSAA) sanctioned sports are offered:

- Baseball (boys)
- Basketball (girls and boys)
  - Boys state champion - 2002
- Bowling (girls and boys)
- Competitive cheerleading (girls)
- Cross country (girls and boys)
  - Boys state champion - 1972
- Football (boys)
- Golf (girls and boys)
- Gymnastics (girls)
- Ice hockey (boys)
- Lacrosse (girls and boys)
- Skiing (girls and boys)
- Soccer (girls and boys)
  - Boys state champion - 2011
- Softball (girls)
- Swim and dive (girls and boys)
- Tennis (girls and boys)
- Track and field (girls and boys)
  - Boys state champion - 2012
- Volleyball (girls)
- Wrestling (boys)

== Notable alumni ==
- Greg Hildebrandt and Tim Hildebrandt '54, science fiction artists and co-designers of the original Star Wars poster
- David Holston '04, professional basketball player
- Mike Lewis, '02, former Arena Football League player and 2005 MIAA Defensive MVP.
- John Morton '88, football coach and Offensive Coordinator for the Detroit Lions.
- Elizabeth Reaser '93, actress
