= Troy School District =

Troy School District may refer to:

- Troy School District (Michigan) in Troy, Michigan
- Troy School District (New York) in Troy, New York
- Troy School District (Idaho) in Troy, Idaho
- Troy Area School District in Troy, Pennsylvania
- Lincoln County R-III School District in Troy, Missouri
