= William Caswell (disambiguation) =

William E. Caswell was an American physicist.

William Caswell may also refer to:

- William Caswell (politician), 18th-century American politician
- Bill Caswell, musician
- William Caswell, owner of Daniel H. and William T. Caswell Houses, Texas
- William Caswell, owner of Caswell House (Troy, Michigan)
