= Robin Sloan =

American novelist

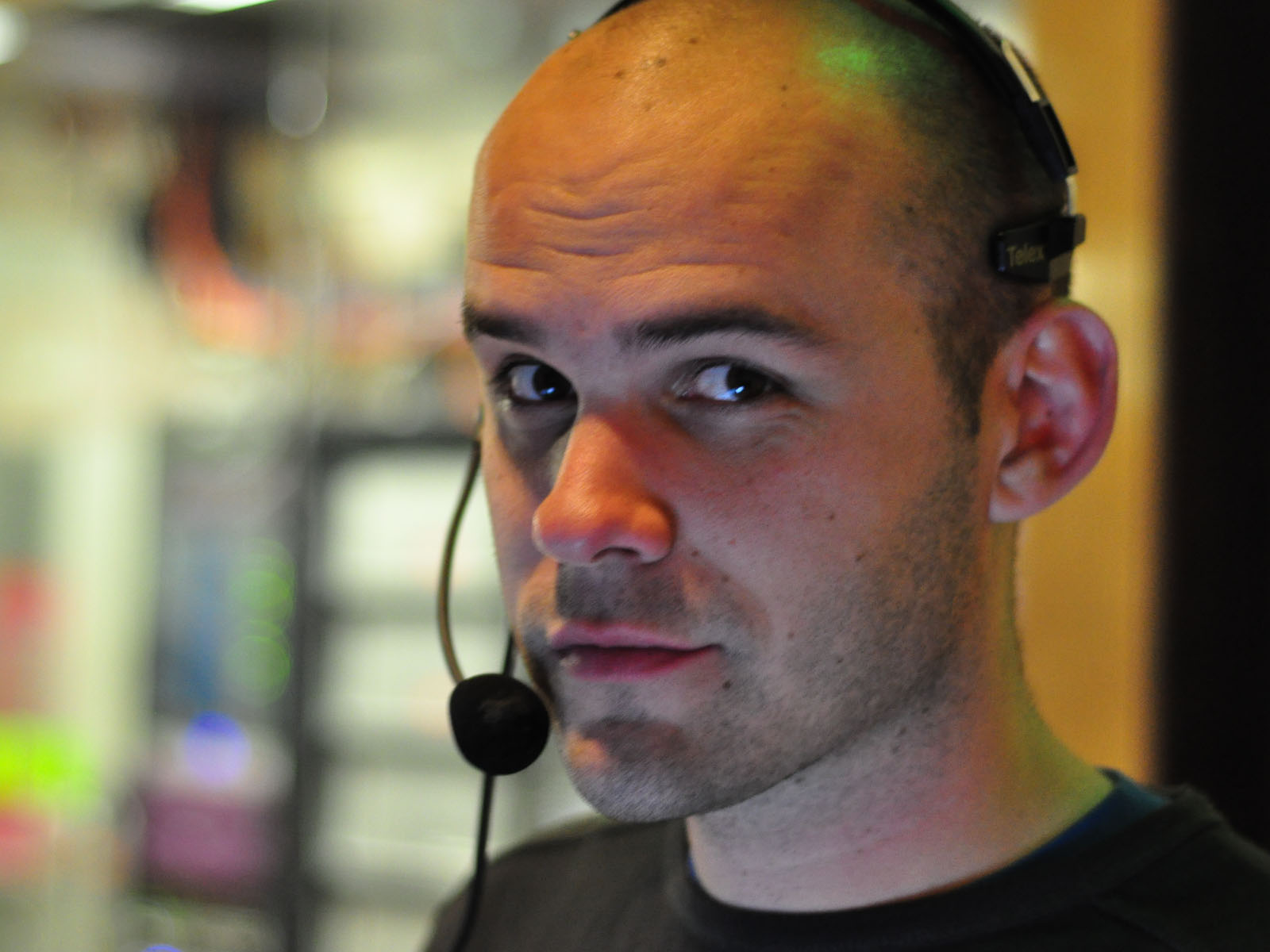
- Sloan in 2008
- Born: United States
- Education: Michigan State University
- Writing career
- Genre: Novels
- Notable work: Mr. Penumbra's 24-Hour Bookstore
- Website: www.robinsloan.com

Robin Sloan is an American author. His debut novel, Mr. Penumbra's 24-Hour Bookstore, was published in 2012.

== Early life ==
Sloan was born to a home economics teacher and an appliance salesman. He grew up in Troy, Michigan, where he attended Wattles Elementary School. He graduated from Athens High School in 1998.

Sloan attended Michigan State University, where he co-founded the literary magazine Oats. He was also a columnist and cartoonist for The State News student newspaper. He graduated in 2002 with a degree in economics from the Eli Broad College of Business. He moved to St. Petersburg, Florida, after graduation for a fellowship at the Poynter Institute. In 2003, he founded the SnarkMarket blog with some friends.

Sloan moved to the San Francisco Bay Area in 2004 to work at Current TV as a media strategist/interactive producer.

== Career ==
Sloan crowdfunded his novella Annabel Scheme in 2009 through Kickstarter. After successfully funding the project, he quit his job at Current to write the novella full time. About a thousand copies of the novella were printed and the novella was released under a Creative Commons NonCommercial license.

Prior to working as an author, Sloan worked at Twitter as a media manager, helping news companies condense their reports to Twitter's 140 characters tweet limit.

Sloan's first novel Mr. Penumbra's 24-Hour Bookstore was released in 2012. The story began as a 6,000 word short story published onto Sloan's personal website and Kindle Store. The novel was listed in San Francisco Chronicle's list of top 100 books of 2012. It is about a laid-off Silicon Valley tech worker who begins working at a dusty bookstore with very few customers, only to start discovering one secret after another. The mysterious old books, along with the store's owner, lead to a 500‑year‑old secret society.

His second novel Sourdough was released in September 2017. It was listed as one of the San Francisco Chronicle's top 100 books of 2017.

His speculative fiction short story The Conspiracy Museum was published in The Atlantic in May 2020 as part of the "Shadowlands" project exploring conspiracy thinking in the United States.

His third novel, Moonbound, was released on 11 June 2024.

== Personal life ==
Sloan resides in Rockridge, Oakland, California. Sloan and his partner Kathryn Tomajan produce olive oil under the Fat Gold brand. They harvest off of leased land in Sunol, California.

== Bibliography ==
- Annabel Scheme (2010)
- Mr. Penumbra's 24-Hour Bookstore (2012) ISBN 978-1-92207-916-9
- Ajax Penumbra 1969 (2013) ISBN 978-0-374-71184-9
- Sourdough: Or, Lois and Her Adventures in the Underground Market: A Novel (2017) ISBN 978-0-374-20310-8
- Annabel Scheme and the Adventure of the New Golden Gate (2020) (Novella; "neither sequel nor prequel to the original Annabel Scheme novella published in 2009".)
- The Suitcase Clone (2022) ISBN 978-1-25088-265-3
- Moonbound (2024) ISBN 978-0374610609
