= Athens High School (Troy, Michigan) =

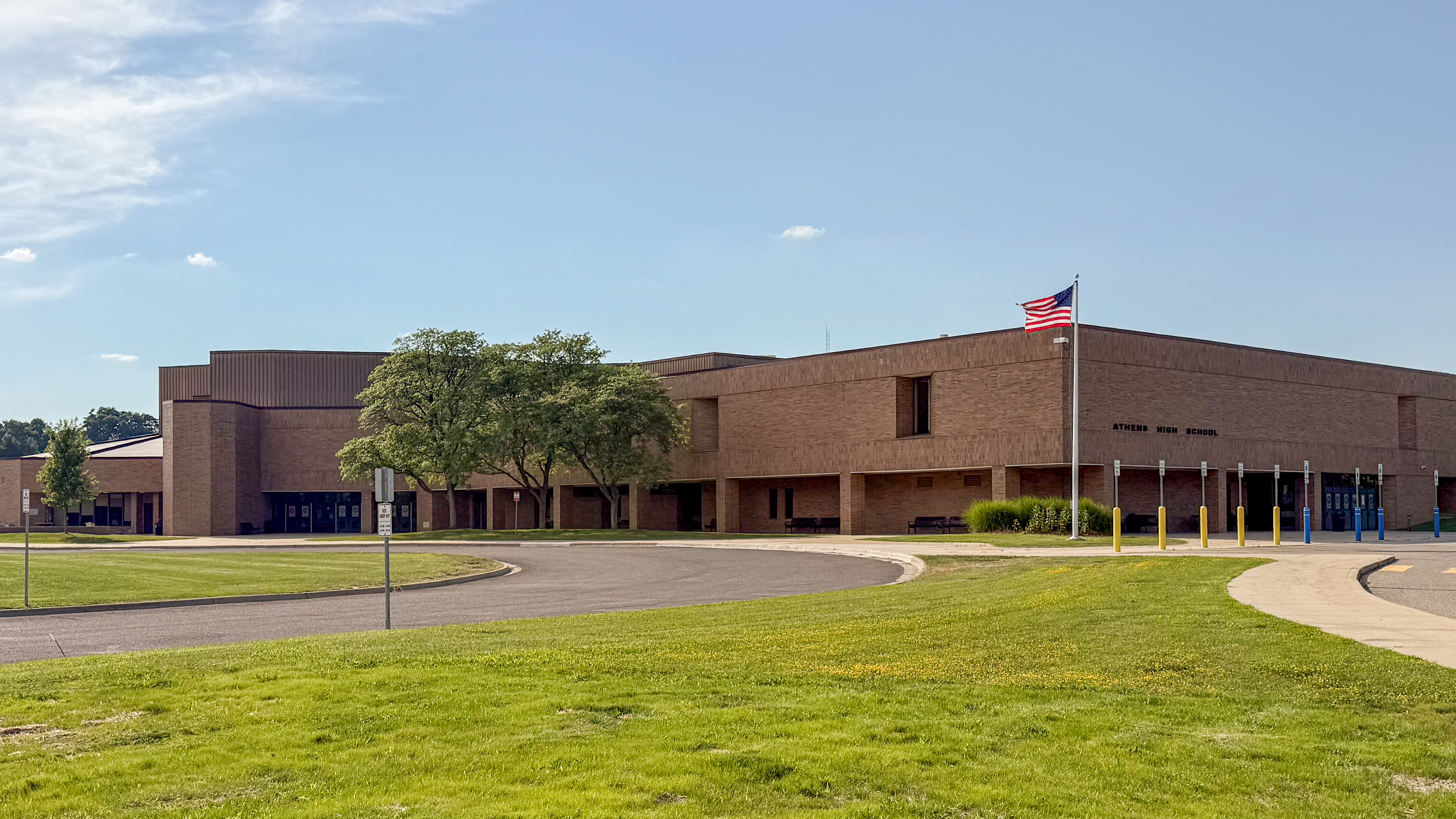

Location
- 4333 John R Rd; Troy, MI 48085; United States; 42.5814°N 83.1103°W

Information
- Type: Public high school
- Established: 1974
- School district: Troy School District
- Superintendent: Richard Machesky
- Principal: Vernon Burden
- Teaching staff: 81.00 (FTE)
- Enrollment: 1,468 (2024-2025)
- Student to teacher ratio: 18.12
- Colors: Red and gold
- Mascot: Red Hawks
- Website: https://athens.troy.k12.mi.us/

Troy Athens High School is a public high school located in Troy, Michigan, USA. It is attended by nearly 1,600 students, serving grades 9-12. Athens is one of four high schools in the Troy School District, along with Troy High School, Troy College & Career High School and International Academy East. Athens High School opened in fall 1974.

== History ==
Facing fast enrollment growth, voters in Troy School District passed a bond issue in 1970 to fund the construction of several schools, including a new high school. On November 23, 1971, the school board approved the preliminary architectural plans, drawn by the Warren Holmes Company. One week later, they revealed the location of the new high school.

Classrooms were initially arranged in "houses" according to academic subject and included both traditional and open classrooms. The 2,000-seat auditorium features an arena-type stage that is surrounded by the audience on three sides. The project cost $11.5 million or about $96 million in 2026 dollars.

As part of the district's 2022 bond issue projects, Athens High School will be completely renovated. The academic sections will be demolished and rebuilt on the west side of the school. Construction is planned to start in spring 2027 and be completed for the 2029-2030 school year. TMP Architecture will design the project.

== Athletics ==
As of 2025, Athens offers 13 varsity sports teams for boys and 14 varsity sports teams for girls. These sports include baseball, basketball, competitive cheerleading, alpine skiing, American football, golf, gymnastics, ice hockey, lacrosse, association football, softball, swimming, tennis, track and field, volleyball, water polo, and scholastic wrestling. Athens plays in one of the top competitive leagues in the State of Michigan, the Oakland Activities Association (OAA), with 27 other member schools of the league, all under the regulation of the Michigan High School Athletic Association (MHSAA).

Athens' athletics rival is crosstown high school Troy High School (Michigan).

== Commendations ==
Athens is a National and Michigan Exemplary School and has been named one of the best high schools (ranked 881st in the 2019 ranking) in the United States by US News.

Athens Theater Company has been nominated by USA Weekend for National Recognition in the HSM Showstopper contest, for its performance of Disney's High School Musical in spring 2008.

== Notable alumni ==
- Martin Klebba, actor, known from Pirates of the Caribbean films
- Ivana Miličević, film and television actress
- Tomo Miličević, musician and guitarist of Thirty Seconds to Mars
- Bridget Regan, musician, Flogging Molly
- Robin Sloan, author of Mr. Penumbra’s 24-Hour Bookstore
- Ryan Stegman, artist for Marvel Comics' Venom, The Superior Spider-Man, Uncanny Avengers, Scarlet Spider, Inhuman, and The Amazing Spider-Man
- Jason Dungjen, 1998 winter olympics pairs figure skater
- Dave Stephens, musician, We Came As Romans
