= Troy High School (Michigan) =

Location
- 4777 Northfield Parkway; Troy, Michigan 48098; United States; 42°33′58″N 83°09′00″W

Information
- Type: Public secondary
- Motto: Home of the Colts
- Established: 1950
- School district: Troy School District
- Principal: Dr. Christopher Smith
- Teaching staff: 110.30 (FTE)
- Grades: 9–12
- Enrollment: 2,032 (2024-2025)
- Student to teacher ratio: 18.42
- Campus: Suburban
- Colors: Silver and black and sometimes Red
- Song: Troy High Victory
- Mascot: Colt
- Rival: Athens High School
- Newspaper: The Chariot
- Yearbook: Gladiator
- Website: School website

Troy High School (THS) is a public high school in Troy, Michigan, United States. It enrolls approximately 2,000 students in grades 9–12. It is one of four high schools in the Troy School District, along with Athens High School, Troy College and Career School, and International Academy East.

Troy High School was ranked 60th by Newsweek in its listing of America's Best High Schools for 2016.

== History ==
=== Troy's first high schools ===
Troy's original two high schools, Log Cabin and Big Beaver, were in separate districts. The districts merged in order to finance a comprehensive high school. Big Beaver School, which was built near the northeast corner of Big Beaver Road and Stephenson Highway in 1919, housed its high school on the second floor between 1937 and 1950.

Log Cabin High School, built in 1917, was located in a part of Clawson that merged with the Big Beaver district before Clawson had a district of its own.

=== Former building ===
In 1949, voters passed a $600,000 bond issue to build Troy High School, to be designed by architecture firm Bennett and Straight. It opened in February 1951. It was located at 3179 Livernois (now the Troy Community Center).

A 1961 addition (designed by Wyeth and Harman Architects of Port Huron) added 25 classrooms, a library, and several other rooms. In 1970, half-days were instituted due to overcrowding. By February 1972, when another large addition (containing a swimming pool and classrooms) opened, the building housed 2,016 students. Despite the addition and the construction of Athens High School, the building remained overcrowded and portable classrooms were installed.

As part of its 1978 building program, the district built a 815-seat auditorium addition at Troy High. TMP Architecture designed the project.

Despite the new auditorium, by 1985 the district was considering replacing the building. The additions had created a maze-like interior, and the building had "asbestos in ceilings and walls; a leaky, sagging roof; poor lighting; a sinking foundation; failing boilers and crowded hallways."

The community was divided over spending money for a new building, and several bond issue votes failed. Many supported a renovation and expansion plan for the old building. Although the second bond issue failed to pass, the school board proceeded to plan a new high school, and six of the seven board members were recalled as a result. On December 11, 1989, voters approved a $33.5 million bond issue to replace the school. The issue of asbestos became dire in December 1990 when a roof leak dislodged a small part of the cafeteria ceiling. Although the asbestos-laden material was captured by a newer ceiling below it, emergency repairs were enacted and the air was monitored for asbestos particles.

In summer 1992, the building closed when the high school moved to its new building. In 1993, old Troy High housed two elementary schools while they were closed for renovations.

In July 1995, the City of Troy announced that it was buying old Troy High for $3.9 million and would use it to expand the civic center. The building was renovated into the Troy Community Center, which opened in March 2002 and was dedicated in February 2003. The project took four years to complete and cost $26.5 million.

=== Current building ===
The present high school opened in 1992. The architect was Perkins&Will of Chicago. The architecture is "loose prairie style," inspired by Eliel Saarinen's Cranbrook Academy of Art. The building has an emphasis on horizontal lines with a contrasting entrance "campanile" tower.

The design was motivated by filling the interior with light. Students called the new building airy and bright, with sweeping views of the landscape.

== Academics ==
Student assessments
- 2021–22 school year Change vs. prior year

M-STEP 11th grade proficiency rates (Science / Social Studies)
- Advanced %: 32.6 / 22.7
- Proficient %: 25.6 / 27.0
- PR. Proficient %: 11.3 / 37.4
- Not Proficient %: 30.5 / 12.9

Average test scores
- SAT Total: 1213.4 (▼ −19.1)

Troy High School offers Advanced Placement (AP) courses, including AP Calculus AB, AP Calculus BC, AP Statistics, AP United States History, AP Chemistry, AP World History, AP Human Geography, AP Economics, AP Psychology, AP Environmental Science, and AP Biology.

== Extracurricular activities ==
There are six Troy High bands: the Campus Band, the Cadet Band, the Concert Band, the Symphonic Band, the Troy Colt Marching Band, and the Jazz Band. The Cadet, Concert and Symphonic Bands – together comprising the Marching Band – appeared by the Queen's invitation (through a representative of the Lord Mayor of London) at the 2007 London New Year's Day Parade. The 1974 Marching Band participated in the Orange Bowl Parade. In 2004, the Troy High Symphonic Band played at Carnegie Hall in New York City.

Troy High School has three choirs. The Concert Choir is an advanced choir that requires an audition to join. The Treble Choir is the less skilled choir that does not require an audition to join. The A Capella Choir is an after-school group that is run by students, has a limited number of members, and requires an audition to join.

There are also four Troy High School string orchestras: the Freshman Orchestra, the Concert Orchestra, the Philharmonic Orchestra, and the Symphony Orchestra. In addition to the orchestras, many string players participate with the Troy Country Fiddlers (which is largely self-directed). In 2017, the Troy High Orchestras performed at Carnegie Hall in New York City.

Troy High School's theatre organization, the Troy Theatre Ensemble, performed in 2004 at the Fringe theatre festival in Edinburgh, Scotland.

The Troy High Science Olympiad team has qualified for the national tournament four times, in 1986, 2002, 2013, and 2016.

The Troy High Quiz Bowl Team participates in Michigan Quiz Bowl.

== Athletics ==
Troy High boys' soccer won the Michigan State Championship for Division I in 2003 and 2026. Troy High football won the Michigan State Class AA championship in 1994. The Troy High women's tennis team won the championship in 2003. Troy High girls' soccer won the Michigan State Championship for Division I in 1994, 2003, and 2013. Troy High girls gymnastics won the Michigan State Championship in 1974. Troy High boys tennis won the state championship in 2021 and 2026.

== Notable alumni ==
- Lauren Molina, Broadway actress, founding member of The Skivvies
- Bud Acton, NBA basketball player
- Henry Akin, NBA basketball player
- Jon Berti, baseball player
- Richard "Dick" Billings, Major League Baseball player
- Sutton Foster, Tony Award-winning Broadway actress
- Ellen Hollman, actress, Spartacus
- Christopher W. Jones, Chemical Engineer and researcher of catalysis and carbon dioxide capture. Class of 1991.
- Marcus Kennedy, basketball player
- Steve McCatty, MLB pitcher and coach
- Donna McKechnie, Broadway, film and television actress
- Brian Ottney, Michigan State football player
- Aileen Wuornos, female serial killer and inspiration for the 2003 film Monster
- Steven Yeun, actor and comedian, most notably from The Walking Dead
- James Young, NBA player; 2019-20 top scorer in the Israel Basketball Premier League
