= Caswell House =

Caswell House may refer to:

- Caswell House (Troy, Michigan), listed on the National Register of Historic Places in Oakland County, Michigan
- Daniel H. and William T. Caswell Houses, Austin, Texas, listed on the NRHP in Travis County, Texas
- Caswell House (Georgetown, Texas), listed on the National Register of Historic Places in Williamson County, Texas
- Caswell–Taylor House, formerly listed on the National Register of Historic Places in Knox County, Tennessee
