= Carswell (disambiguation) =

Carswell is a surname. It may also refer to:

- Carswell, West Virginia, United States, an unincorporated community
- Carswell Air Force Base, Texas, a former United States Air Force base
  - Federal Medical Center, Carswell, a federal prison at the base
- Carswell impact structure, an impact crater in Saskatchewan, Canada
- Carswell (publisher), Canadian publisher

== See also ==
- Carswell Manor, Oxfordshire, England a Jacobean country house
- Carswell Medieval House, a Grade II*-listed historic stone ruin of a medieval tenant farm in the village of Penally, Pembrokeshire, Wales
- Carswell House, Newark, Delaware, United States, on the National Register of Historic Places
- Caswell (disambiguation)
