= Caswell =

Caswell may refer to:

== Places ==
=== United Kingdom ===
- Caswell, Swansea, a village in Wales
  - Caswell Bay, nearby
- Caswell, Northamptonshire, a lost settlement and technology park in England

=== United States ===
- Caswell, Maine, a town
- Caswell Memorial State Park, California
- Caswell County, North Carolina
- Caswell, Wisconsin, a town
- Caswell Air Force Station, Maine
- Fort Watauga, more properly Fort Caswell, an American Revolutionary War fort in what is now Tennessee

== People ==
- Caswell (surname), a list of people with the surname
- Caswell J. Crebs (1912–1988), American jurist
- Caswell Silver (1916–1988), American geologist and entrepreneur

== Other uses ==
- USS Caswell (AKA-72), American amphibious military cargo ship
- ST Caswell, British tugboat
- Caswell Developmental Center for adults with intellectual disabilities, in North Carolina

== See also ==
- Caswell House (disambiguation)
- Caswell Public Library (Former), Harrison, Maine, on the National Register of Historic Places
- Caswell-Massey, personal care product company and apothecary shop founded in 1752 in Rhode Island
