= Troy College and Career High School =

High school in Troy, Michigan, United States

Location
- 1522 E Big Beaver Road; Troy, Michigan 48083; United States; 42°36′18″N 83°9′12″W

Information
- Type: Public
- Established: 1995
- School district: Troy Public Schools
- Supervisor: Angela Milanov
- Staff: 14
- Enrollment: 150
- Nickname: Eagle
- Website: School website

Student assessments
- 2021–22 school year

M-STEP 11th grade proficiency rates (Science / Social Studies)
- Advanced %: ≤20 / ≤20
- Proficient %: ≤20 / ≤20
- PR. Proficient %: ≤20 / 48.1
- Not Proficient %: – / 29.6

Average test scores
- SAT Total: 886.1

Troy College and Career High School, formerly Niles Community High School, is a non-traditional public high school in Troy, Michigan. A part of Troy Public Schools, it is attended by approximately 150 students in and around Troy.
