= Caswell House (Troy, Michigan) =

Historic house in Michigan, United States

- U.S. National Register of Historic Places
- Michigan State Historic Site
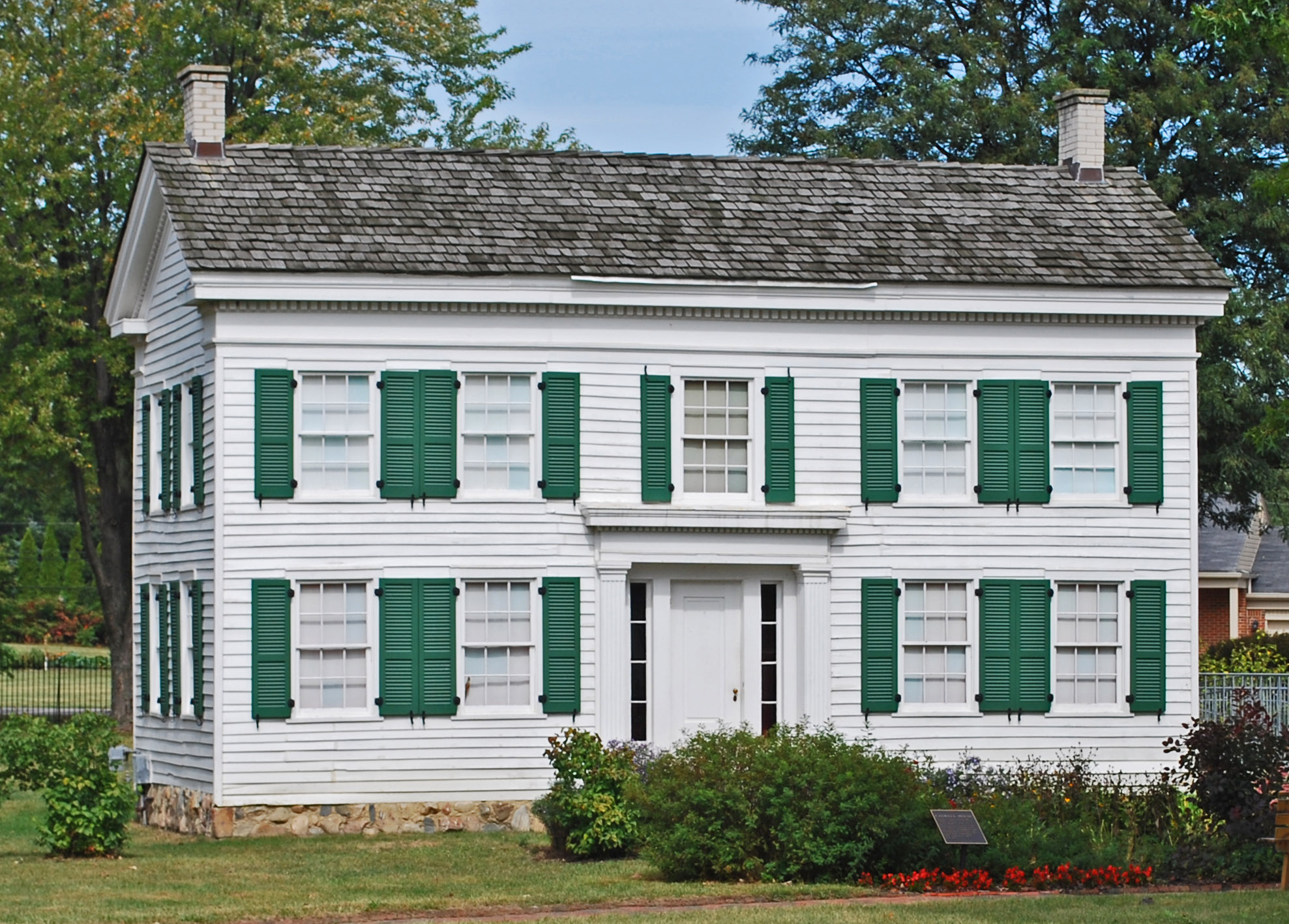

- Location within Michigan Location within the United States
- Interactive map showing the location for Caswell House
- Location: 60 W. Wattles Rd., Troy, Michigan
- Coordinates: 42°34′40″N 83°9′3″W
- Area: less than one acre
- Built: 1832
- Built by: Solomon Caswell
- Architectural style: Greek Revival
- NRHP reference No.: 72000650

Significant dates
- Added to NRHP: January 13, 1972
- Designated MSHS: November 14, 1969

The Caswell House is a single family house located at 60 W. Wattles Road in Troy, Michigan in the Troy Museum and Historic Village. It is an especially well-preserved example of Greek Revival architecture. It was designated a Michigan State Historic Site in 1969 and listed on the National Register of Historic Places in 1972.

== History ==
In May 1823, pioneering farmer Solomon Caswell and his wife Hulda moved to a farm near what is now the intersection of Big Beaver and Adams Roads, and in 1823 built a log cabin to live in. In 1832, the couple built this house to replace the log cabin. Huldah died in 1844, and Solomon quickly remarried to Melinda Marvin. The Caswells constructed an addition to the house in 1850; Solomon Caswell lived in the house until his death in 1880.

After Solomon Caswell's death, his descendants continued to live in the house. A porch was added in 1920. Solomon Caswell's descendants occupied the house until 1965, when William Caswell, Solomon's grandson, died as a bachelor. William Caswell willed the house and property to a friend, who sold it to North Hills Christian Reformed Church. In 1968, the house was threatened with demolition, but the church donated the home to the Troy Historical Society, who moved to its present location and fully restored it. The house is now part of the Troy Museum and Historic Village.

== Description ==
The Solomon and Hulda Caswell House is a two-story frame Greek Revival house with clapboard. The foundation is now built of concrete block faced with fieldstone. A 1 1/2-story addition is built on the rear. The front facade has a central entrance flanked with pilasters and surmounted with a heavy entablature.

== See also ==
- National Register of Historic Places listings in Oakland County, Michigan
