= Woodside Bible Church =

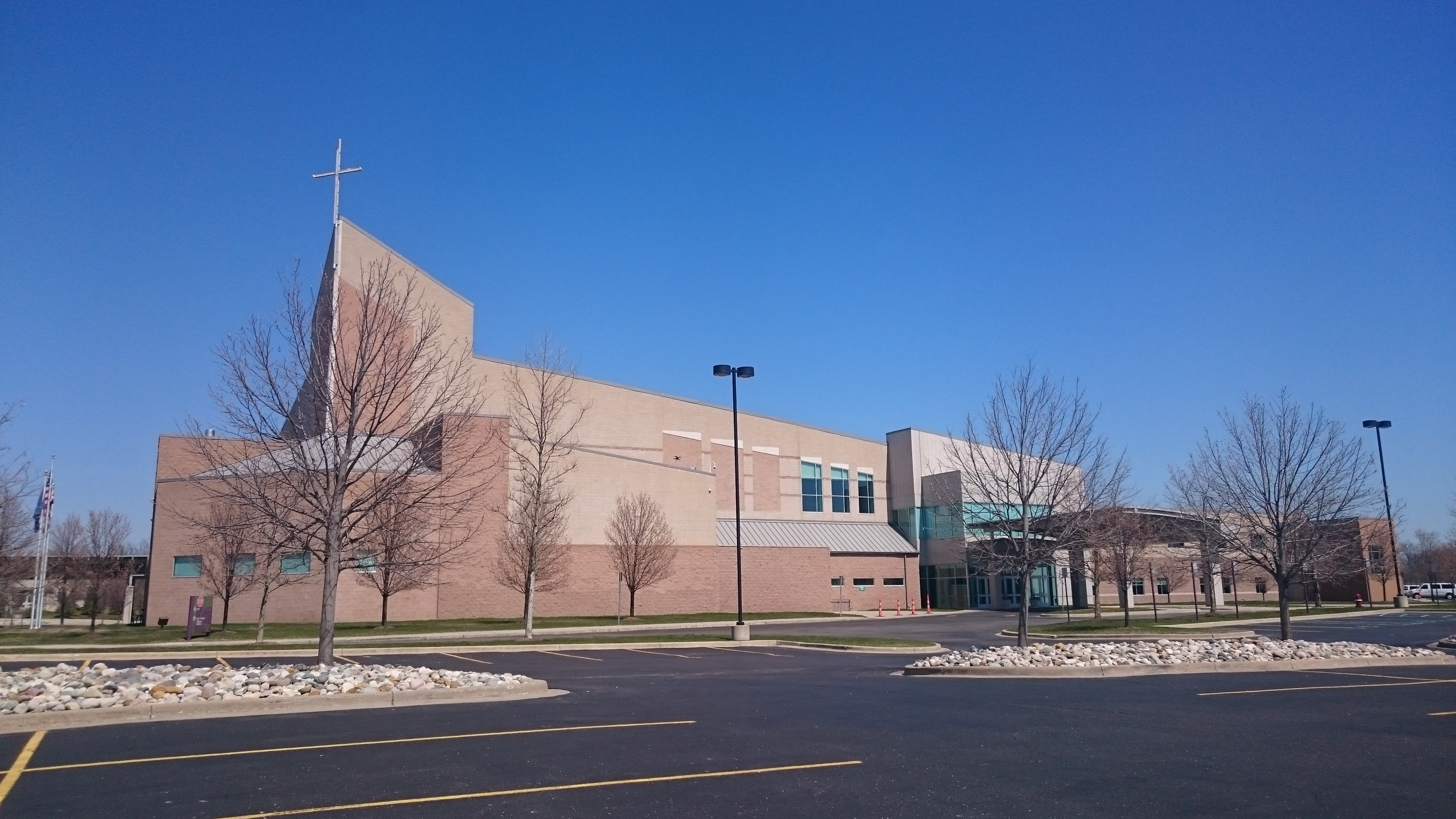
- Main campus of Woodside Bible Church in Troy, MI
- Woodside Bible Church
- 42°36′59″N 83°07′39″W
- Location: Troy, MI
- Country: United States
- Denomination: Non-Denominational
- Previous denomination: Baptist (1955-2002)
- Churchmanship: Evangelical
- Website: https://woodsidebible.org/

History
- Former name(s): Big Beaver Baptist, Troy Baptist
- Founded: 1955
- Founder: Rev. Harold Moran

Woodside Bible Church is a non-denominational Christian megachurch based in Troy, Michigan. It is a multi-site church with 14 locations in the Detroit Metro area, with a total weekly attendance of over 9,000. The church is led by Pastor Chris Brooks, who has served as the church's senior pastor since May 2019.

== History ==
Originally named Big Beaver Baptist, the church was founded in 1955, by Rev. Harold Moran and a few families who would hold meetings in homes in the Troy, Michigan area. A converted home was purchased the same year at 3193 Rochester Rd. The church remained at this address until 2005. In 1962, the name was changed to Troy Baptist Church. Larger auditoriums were built on the property in 1973 and 1980. The name was changed to Woodside Bible Church in 2002, and moved to the current location in 2005. In July 2005, Woodside celebrated their 50th Anniversary as a church and, in September of that same year, merged with Redeemer Baptist Church in Warren, Michigan creating the second Woodside location. Woodside has since added another 13 locations in the following years.

In 2007, it was considered to be "one of the nation's fastest-growing congregations".

In 2010 Pastor Doug Schmidt joined with others to form The Evangelical Pastors Network, a group which provides inspiration and assistance for evangelical pastors.

In 2015, Woodside Bible was listed as the 48th largest church in America, and the 56th fastest growing church by Outreach Magazine.

In May 2019, Pastor Doug Schmidt retired and was succeeded by Pastor Chris Brooks.
