= Former Caswell Public Library =

- Caswell Public Library (Former)
- U.S. National Register of Historic Places
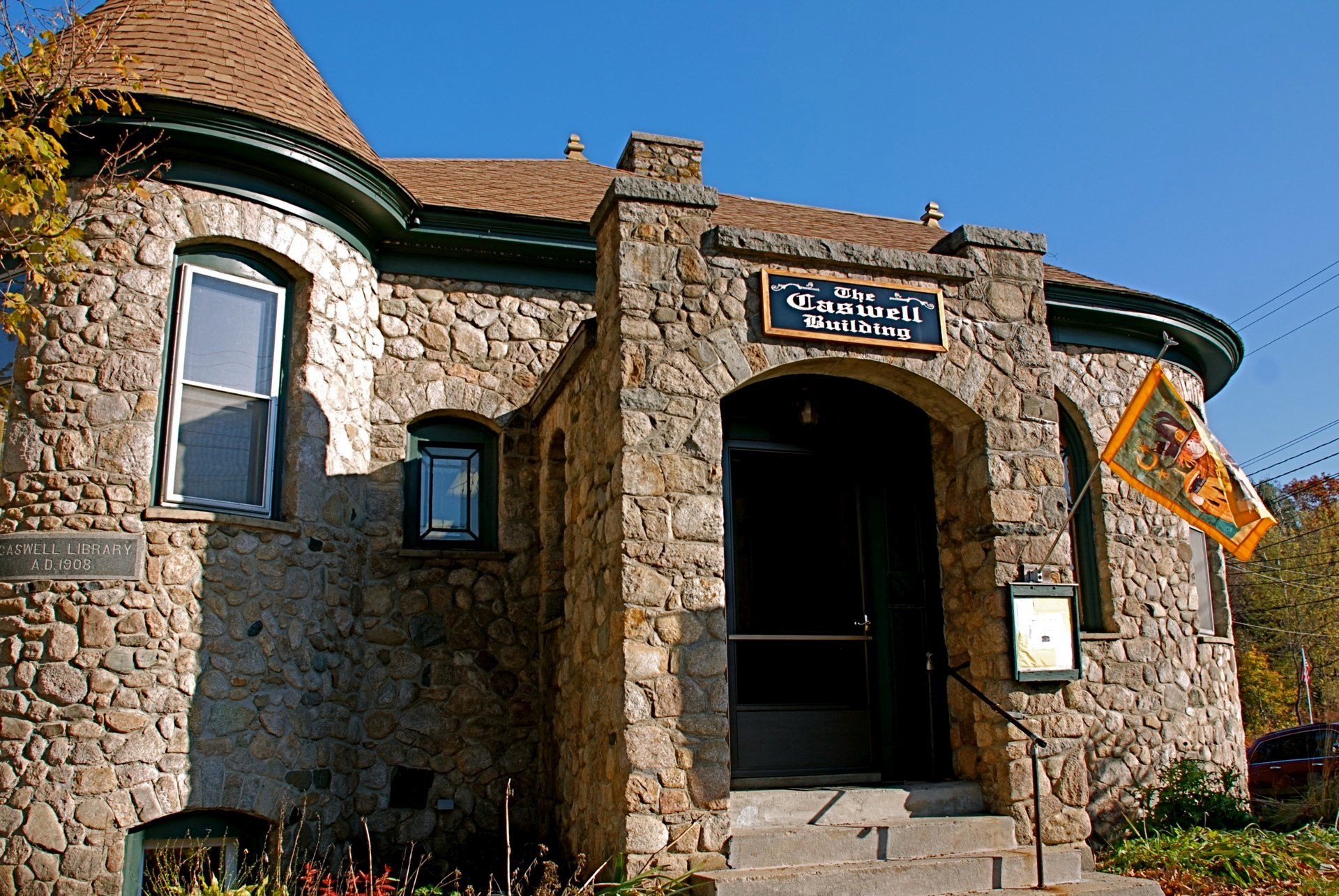

- Location within Maine Location within the United States
- Location: 42 Main St., Harrison, Maine
- Coordinates: 44.11075°N 70.68037°W
- Area: 0.2 acres (0.081 ha)
- Built: 1908
- Architect: John H. Proctor
- Architectural style: Romanesque
- MPS: Maine Public Libraries MPS
- NRHP reference No.: 05000056
- Added to NRHP: February 15, 2005

The Former Caswell Public Library is an historic building at 42 Main Street in Harrison, Maine. Built in 1908-09, it is one of the small community's most architecturally distinctive buildings, designed in the Romanesque Revival style by a local architect. It is named for Daniel Caswell, a generous benefactor to the library, and housed the local public library until 2004. It was listed on the National Register of Historic Places in 2005. The building is presently vacant.

== Description and history ==
The former Caswell Public Library stands on the north side of Main Street (Maine State Routes 35 and 117), in the village center of Harrison, at the northern end of Long Lake. It is a single-story stone structure, built out of uncoursed granite cobbles mortared in place. The building is basically rectangular, with a hip roof. A semicircular section projects from the southern part of the eastern facade, its semi-conical roofline joining that of the main roof. A round turret projects from the southwestern corner of the building, topped by a conical roof. The entrance is set recessed in a projecting vestibule that features a segmented-arch opening and corner pillars that rise above the projection's roof, giving a crenellated effect. The interior is arranged similarly to other 19th-century libraries, with a central circulation desk, a reading room in the semicircular section, and the stack area to the rear. The basement houses offices and a small meeting area and kitchen space.

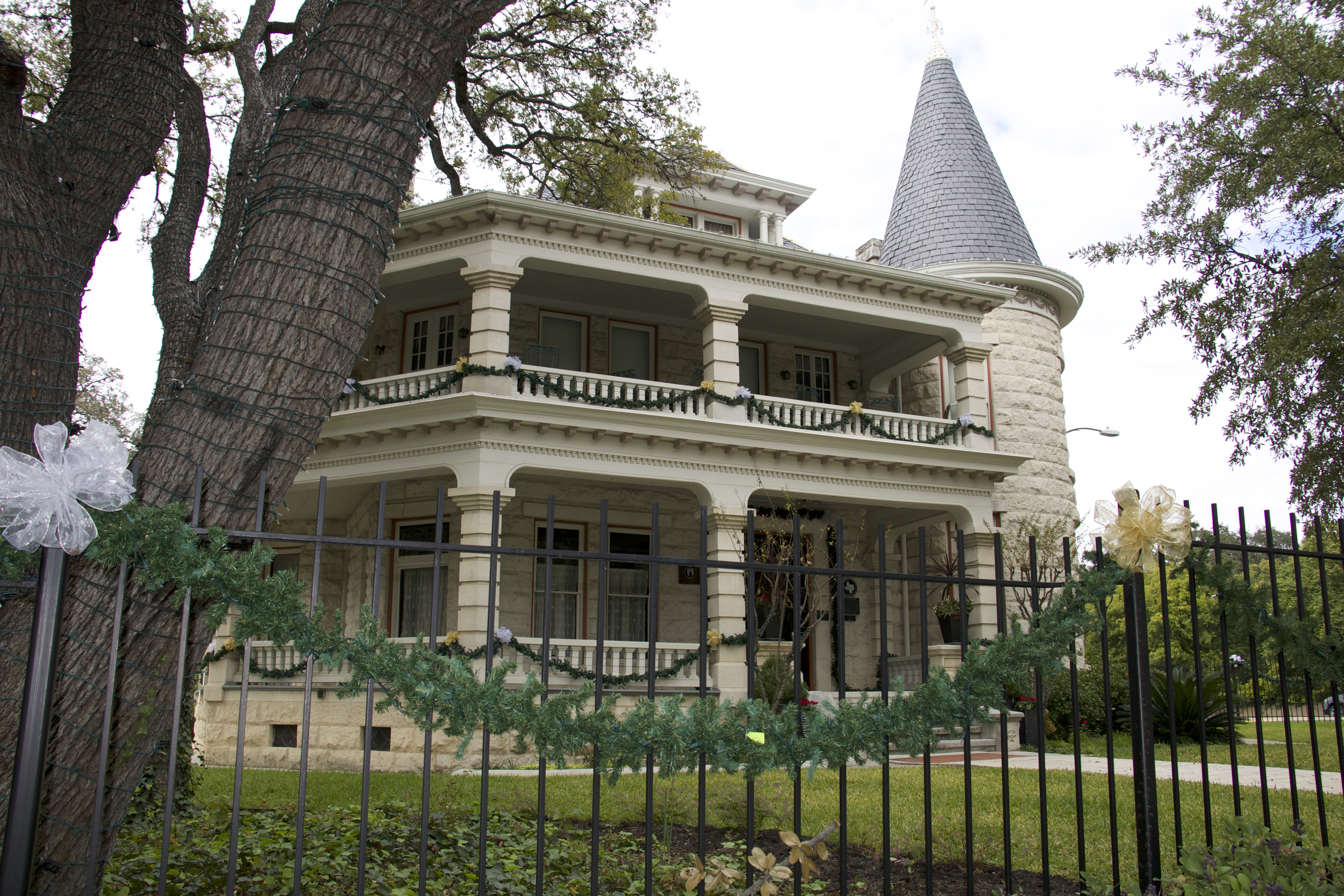
Daniel Caswell's house in Austin, Texas

The Harrison Public Library Association (renamed the Caswell Public Library Association in 1947) was established in 1906, its initial collection based on the content of two private circulating collections in the town. The building that housed its collection was destroyed by fire in 1907, although the collection was saved. Daniel Caswell, a Harrison native living in Texas, donated $1,000 to a building fund, conditioned on it being named for him. The present building was constructed in 1908 on land previously occupied by a church which had burned down. The architect was John Proctor, a Harrison resident whose only known works are in the immediate area; it is his only known library commission. There is a distinct stylistic resemblance between the library and Caswell's house in Austin, Texas, suggesting the benefactor may have had an influence on the design.

The building housed the library until 2004, when space concerns prompted its move to larger quarters. The building was sold to a couple in 2024 and is now a private residence.

== See also ==
- National Register of Historic Places listings in Cumberland County, Maine
