= Mr. Penumbra's 24-Hour Bookstore =

2012 novel by Robin Sloan

- Author: Robin Sloan
- Cover artist: Rodrigo Corral
- Language: English
- Genre: Novel
- Publisher: Farrar, Straus and Giroux
- Publication date: 2012
- Publication place: United States
- Media type: Print (hardcover, paperback)
- Pages: 288 pp (US hardcover)
- ISBN: 978-0374214913
- OCLC: 778422009
- Dewey Decimal: 813/.6
- LC Class: PS3619.L6278 M7 2012
- Preceded by: Ajax Penumbra 1969

Mr. Penumbra's 24-Hour Bookstore is a 2012 novel by American writer Robin Sloan. It was chosen as one of the best 100 books of 2012 by the San Francisco Chronicle, was a New York Times Editor's Choice, and was on the New York Times Hardcover Fiction Best Seller list as well as the NPR Hardcover Fiction Bestseller List. The US book cover, which glows in the dark, was done by Rodrigo Corral and chosen as one of the 25 best book covers for 2012 by BookPage.

Mr. Penumbra's 24-Hour Bookstore combines elements of fantasy, mystery, friendship and adventure as a way of looking at the modern conflict and transition between new technology (electronic) and old (print books). The protagonist is a laid-off Silicon Valley tech worker who begins working at a dusty bookstore with very few customers, only to start discovering one secret after another. The mysterious old books, along with the store's owner, lead to a 500-year-old secret society.

A prequel novelette, Ajax Penumbra 1969, was published in 2012.

He was inspired to write the story after a friend misread a sign claiming the existence of a "24 hour bookshop".

== Characters ==
1. Clay Jannon is the lead protagonist in Mr. Penumbra's 24-Hour Bookstore. At the beginning of Robin Sloan's novel, he is an unemployed software developer that just recently lost his job at a startup. After losing his job, Clay stumbled upon a 24-hour Bookstore with a HELP WANTED sign posted in the window. He decided to apply and was hired to work really late night shifts. Slate.com describes Clay as, " a sort of Bay Area everyman—tech-savvy, aimless, and possessing of a clutch of brilliant friends with high-powered jobs. "
2. Kat Potente is an employee at Google who helps Clay out with trying to decipher the books. She found her way to the 24-hour bookstore with an online ad, and then over time becomes Clay's romantic interest throughout the novel. Throughout the novel, she repeatedly uses her job to her advantage, using all of the large tech company's resources.
3. Neel Shah is Clay's childhood friend that happens to be very wealthy and owns a large tech company. Neel is very intrigued with the mystery and decides to help Clay throughout the novel to decipher certain parts of the books.
4. Oliver Grone (secondary) is the other employee in Mr. Penumbra's 24-Hour Bookstore. He works the day shift and has to interact with Clay during the shift change. He helps Mr Penumbra and Clay with the plan to decipher the books.

== Reviews ==
1. The New York Times Sunday Book Review said that Mr. Penumbra's 24-Hour Bookstore "dexterously tackles the intersection between old technologies and new with a novel that is part love letter to books, part technological meditation, part thrilling adventure, part requiem."
2. The Boston Globe Review tells prospective readers Mr. Penumbra's 24-Hour Bookstore "is worth a read for anyone who has wondered about the epochal changes wrought by the digital revolution." The reviewer also states, "the novel engages with certain questions about technology, humanity, and our attempts at a kind of immortality."
3. The Hindu describes Mr. Penumbra's 24-Hour Bookstore as "a biblio-thriller for the typophile lurking inside all of us." This review gives a general description of the thematic events that happen along the story, while also referencing the language Sloan used to craft the novel. The review ends by stating, "What Sloan accomplishes by the end is give the reader of digital books a glimpse of the debt ebooks owe to the master typographers of the printed book."
4. Slate.com begins by describing the book as "a fantasy novel, though the fantasy occurs mainly at the edges; most of the story is set in a hyper-realistic version of present-day San Francisco." The review ends with the author noting that Sloan "seems to skirt many of the novel’s questions about how digitizing art changes."
5. Bookreporter.com had a very positive review of the novel. The author said that while reading Mr. Penumbra's 24-Hour Bookstore they hadn't "had this much fun reading a book since the first Harry Potter was released. It's a literary adventure full of imaginary companies, websites, books, authors and games interwoven with real ones."
6. Booklore.com describes Mr. Penumbra's 24-Hour Bookstore as "an entirely charming and lovable first novel of mysterious books and dusty bookshops." This review gave the novel an overall 8/10, and praised Robin Sloan for integrating historical and modern culture. The review also gives a general overview of the plot, while not giving out too many details of how the story ends.
7. NPR titled their review "Page And Screen Make Peace In 'Mr. Penumbra'". This review gives more background on Sloan as a writer, mentioning that he is new to the fiction genre and has a passion both for technology and writing. The review is rounded off with a sentiment of, "Mr. Penumbra's 24-Hour Bookstore reminds us of the miracle of reading, no matter how you choose to do it."
