= Christopher W. Jones =

American chemical engineer and researcher

Christopher W. Jones is an American chemical engineer and researcher of catalysis and carbon dioxide capture. In 2024 he is the John Brock III School Chair and Professor of Chemical & Biomolecular Engineering and adjunct professor of chemistry and biochemistry at the Georgia Institute of Technology, in Atlanta, Georgia. Previously he served as associate vice president for research at Georgia Tech (2013-2019), including a stint as interim executive vice-president for research in 2018.

== Early life and education ==
Jones was born in Michigan, where he graduated from Troy High School in 1991. He earned a bachelor's degree from the University of Michigan and masters and doctorate degrees from the California Institute of Technology, all in chemical engineering. At Caltech he studied zeolites and catalysis under the guidance of Prof. Mark E. Davis, who is now the Warren and Katharine Schlinger Professor of Chemical Engineering, Emeritus. Following a post-doctoral appointment in chemistry and chemical engineering at the California Institute of Technology, he joined the faculty at the Georgia Institute of Technology in 2000.

== Career ==
Jones began his independent career studying catalysis with an emphasis on supported molecular catalysts. His early work at the interface of homogeneous and heterogeneous catalysis earned him recognition from the American Chemical Society with the Ipatieff Prize in 2010. When the American Chemical Society (ACS) launched their interdisciplinary catalysis journal, ACS Catalysis, they selected Jones as the first editor-in-chief. ACS Catalysis was recognized by the Association of American Publishers as the Best New Journal in Science, Technology & Medicine in 2012.

In 2006, Jones began work designing solid adsorbents based on supported amines for carbon dioxide (CO_{2}) separation from dilute gas streams. After an initial focus on recovering CO_{2} from flue gas streams associated with coal-fired power plants, in 2008 he turned his attention to the extraction of this gas from the ambient air. His team first reported the use of solid amine adsorbents for CO_{2} capture from air, otherwise known as direct air capture (DAC) at the American Institute of Chemical Engineers' (AIChE Annual Meeting in 2009), and their first peer-reviewed publication on the topic appeared in 2011. His review of emerging methods of carbon capture in 2011 was one of the first describing the nascent field of DAC.

Jones' early work in DAC was carried out in collaboration with Global Thermostat, one of the earliest start-up companies focusing on DAC. Jones was the external examiner of the PhD thesis of Jan Wurzbacher, one of the cofounders of the DAC start-up Climeworks, at ETH Zurich. Since he began work on DAC, Jones has collaborated with a variety of firms on the development of adsorbents and processes for DAC, including Zero Carbon Systems, Carbon Capture Inc., and W. L. Gore. His work on DAC has also been sponsored by the National Science Foundation and the US Department of Energy.

In 2017-2018, he co-led a study of direct air capture technologies and identified knowledge gaps and research needs as part of the US National Academies study of carbon dioxide removal and negative emissions technologies. His updated perspective on research needs in direct air capture was published in 2022. Jones was identified in recent bibliometric analyses as a leading contributor to the DAC literature.

Jones was the recipient of the Paul H. Emmett Award in Fundamental Catalysis from the North American Catalysis Society in 2013 and the Curtis W. McGraw Research Award from the American Society of Engineering Education that same year. The American Institute of Chemical Engineers recognized him as a leading mid-career researcher in 2017 with the Andreas Acrivos Award for Professional Progress in Chemical Engineering. The same organization awarded him the Institute Award for Excellence in Industrial Gases Technology in 2023 for his work on DAC. The ACS Division of Energy & Fuels selected Jones for its Distinguished Researcher Award in 2023. and he received the E. V. Murphree Award in Industrial and Engineering Chemistry from the ACS in 2025, also for his work on DAC.

Jones was elected to the National Academy of Engineering in 2022 for his contributions to the design and synthesis of catalytic materials and for advancing technologies related to carbon capture and sequestration. In 2023, Jones was named a Fellow of the National Academy of Inventors in recognition his numerous patents and contributions to DAC technologies.

Since 2020, Jones has been the inaugural editor-in-chief of the open-access chemistry journal JACS Au, published by the ACS. He was co-chair of the 14th International Conference on Fundamentals of Adsorption, held in 2022. From 2023-2024, Jones was a member of the US National Academies study on Atmospheric Methane Removal. Jones has published over 350 journal articles and patents.
