= Troy Historic Village =

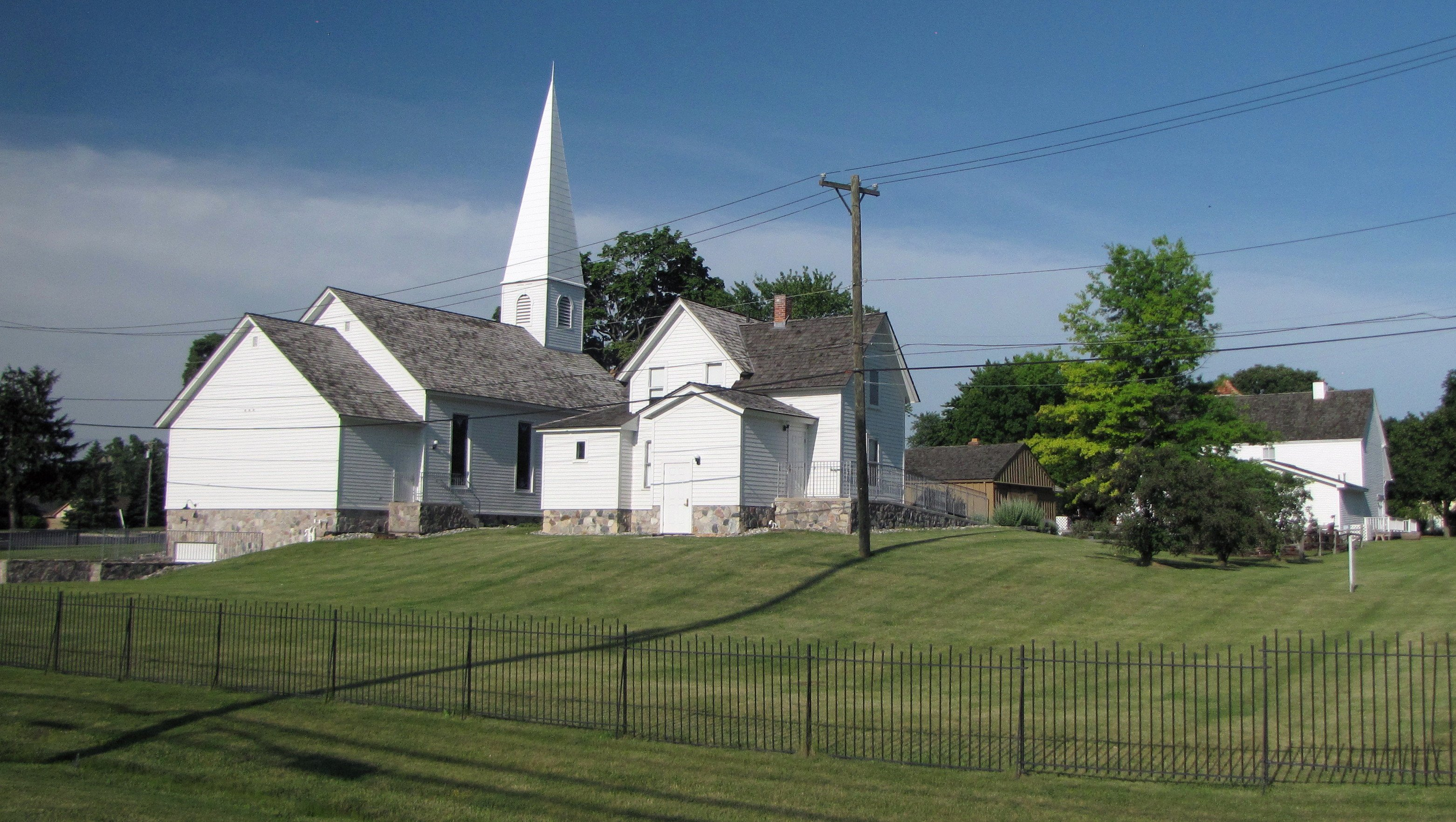
- Location: 60 W. Wattles Rd., Troy, Michigan
- Coordinates: 42.5780°N 83.1495°W
- Website: www.troyhistoricvillage.org

The Troy Historic Village is located in the city of Troy, Michigan. The establishment allows visitors to view the lifestyle of those who lived in Troy Township in the 1800s. The carefully restored buildings include the main building (City Hall), log cabin, a Greek Revival Home, a brick one-room school, print shop, wagon shop, a town hall, a general store, and a turn of the century church and parsonage.

== Buildings ==
=== 1927 Township Hall (Main Building) ===
Township Supervisor and history teacher Morris Wattles supervised the construction of this Dutch Revival building modeled after a colonial inn in Troy, New York. Wattles envisioned the Pioneer Room at the west end of the building as space to exhibit local history, and even used old barn beams and a fireplace crane from pioneer Johnson Niles' inn. The slate roof and the interior woodwork, as well as the frosted glass panels and terrazzo floor are all original. Troy became a city, and Township Hall became City Hall in 1955. Within 10 years Troy was booming and this building was overcrowded. City leadership approved a new city hall on Big Beaver Road, and the Troy Historical Society later won approval to use this building as a museum, fulfilling Mr. Wattles’ dream. This building is currently the office of the Troy Historical Society, who operate the Troy Historic Village on behalf of the City of Troy.

=== Caswell House (Greek Revival Home) ===
Early Troy settler Soloman Caswell built this Greek Revival style home in 1832 on Adams Road just north of Big Beaver Road. Solomon, his children, and grandchildren were the only people to ever reside in the home. Following the death of Solomon’s grandson William Caswell, the house was sold to the North Hills Christian Reformed Church congregation, which donated the house to the Troy Historic Village. The Troy Historical Society raised $8,400 to move the house in 1968. The Caswell House was the first historic structure relocated to the Village where it was restored. It is one of two buildings in Troy on the National Register of Historic Places.

=== Old Troy Church ===
This church was built in 1837 at troy corners. The deed to the land of the church was sold for $1.00 by the pioneer Johnson Niles. New stained glass windows were installed in the church around 1900. Still many of the windows of the church were never removed. The church was changed to the Methodist Episcopal community in 1862. The church served as the village's house of worship until 1963. The original bell in the church is still there to this day.

=== Log Cabin ===
The Log Cabin is a one-room home that serves as a depiction of the life of a pioneer in the 1840s. The cabin has a fireplace that was once used for heat and to provide good meals. The mother of the house did handwork while rocking the baby in a cradle. The parents slept in a bed made of rope, the children instead got to sleep in the loft on straw mattresses covered with quilts.

=== Wagon Shop ===
The Wagon Shop's Blacksmith provided residents of the village with iron farm tools, household utensils and wagon parts as well. the Blacksmith would as work with the wood workers in the village to create objects such as wagons and other things too.

=== General Store ===
The town's general store was built by Edward Peck in 1832. The store was demolished in 1963 but was reconstructed as a representation the store in the village a while later. Inside the store you are able to see examples of items that used to be sold ch as the cast iron stove.

=== Print Shop ===
J. Henry Russell owned this shop. He did woodturning, tinsmithing and also photography. The print store was used to make posters, calling cards and public announcements. Troy Township's old water meter was renovated in the year of 1978 so it could serve as a printshop for the village

=== Parsonage ===
The Parsonage was a cruciform shaped house built in 1978 by the congregation of the Troy Methodist Church. It served as a parsonage for over 25 ministers and their families. The building has been restored to its 1910 image when indoor plumbing and electricity became available.

=== Troy Town Hall ===
The Troy Town Hall was originally built as the Troy Union School in 1864. The school was moved to the Village in 1987 to represent Troy's first town hall, today it serves as a hands-on teaching area.

=== Poppleton School ===
Poppleton was built in 1877. The school was named after a man by the name of William Poppleton, a man who owned 1,200 acres of land in Troy. Children ranging from the ages 8–14 attended this school. The school was taught by only one teacher who taught all the subjects such as reading, arithmetic, spelling, penmanship and more. Boys had to sit on one side while the girls sat on another side. Poppleton school was relocated to the Village in the year 1980
