= Troy School District (Michigan) =

School district in Michigan

Address
- 4400 Livernois Troy, Oakland, Michigan; United States
- Coordinates: 42°35′00.5″N 83°08′48.0″W

District information
- Type: Public school district
- Grades: PK to 12
- Established: 1950; 76 years ago
- Superintendent: Richard Machesky
- School board: Troy Board of Education
- Budget: $222,140,000 2022-2023 expenditures
- NCES District ID: 2634260

Students and staff
- Students: 12,283 (2024-2025)
- Teachers: 731.62 (on an FTE basis) (2024-2025)
- Staff: 1,597.34 FTE (2024-2025)
- Student–teacher ratio: 16.79 (2024-2025)

Other information
- Website: www.troy.k12.mi.us

The Troy School District is a public school district in Metro Detroit in the U.S. state of Michigan, serving most of Troy .

== History ==
Troy School district was formed by consolidating several former school districts in 1950.

The first Troy High School opened in fall 1950 and was replaced in 1992. Athens High School was built in 1974.

On November 8, 2022, voters approved a $555 million bond issue for school renovations and construction.

== Schools ==
Schools in Troy School District
Preschools
School	Address	Notes
Troy Preschool	205 W. Square Lake Rd., Troy	Preschool, Built 2019
Elementary Schools (Grades K–5)
School	Address	Notes
Bemis Elementary	3571 Northfield Parkway, Troy	Built 1978
Barnard Elementary	3601 Forge, Troy	Built 1978
Costello Elementary	1333 Hamman Road, Troy	Built 1972
Hamilton Elementary	5625 Northfield Parkway, Troy	Built 1983
Hill Elementary	4600 Forsyth Drive, Troy	Built 1967
Leonard Elementary	4401 Tallman Drive, Troy	Built 1959
Martell Elementary	5666 Livernois, Troy	Built 1972
Morse Elementary	475 Cherry St., Troy	Built 1956
Schroeder Elementary	3541 Jack Drive, Troy	Built 1970
Troy Union Elementary	1340 East Square Lake Rd., Troy	Built 1925
Wass Elementary	2340 Willard Dr., Troy	Built 1978
Wattles Elementary	3555 Ellenboro, Troy	Built 1967
Middle Schools (Grades 6–8)
School	Address	Notes
Baker Middle School	1359 Torpey Drive, Troy	Built 2006.
Boulan Park Middle School	3570 Northfield Parkway, Troy	Built 1971.
Larson Middle School	2222 East Long Lake Road, Troy	Built 1971.
Smith Middle School	5835 Donaldson, Troy	Built 1967. Replacement building to open fall 2026.
High Schools (Grades 9–12)
School	Address	Notes
Athens High School	4333 John R. Road, Troy	Built 1974. Academic areas are planned to be rebuilt starting in 2027 as part of the approved 2022 Bond.
International Academy East	1291 Torpey Road, Troy	Uses the International Baccalaureate curriculum. Built 1952.
Troy College and Career High School	1522 East Big Beaver Road, Troy	Housed in Troy Learning Center, built in 1970.
Troy High School	4777 Northfield Parkway, Troy	Built 1992.
