= Daniel H. and William T. Caswell Houses =

Historic house in Texas, United States

- U.S. National Register of Historic Places
- Recorded Texas Historic Landmark
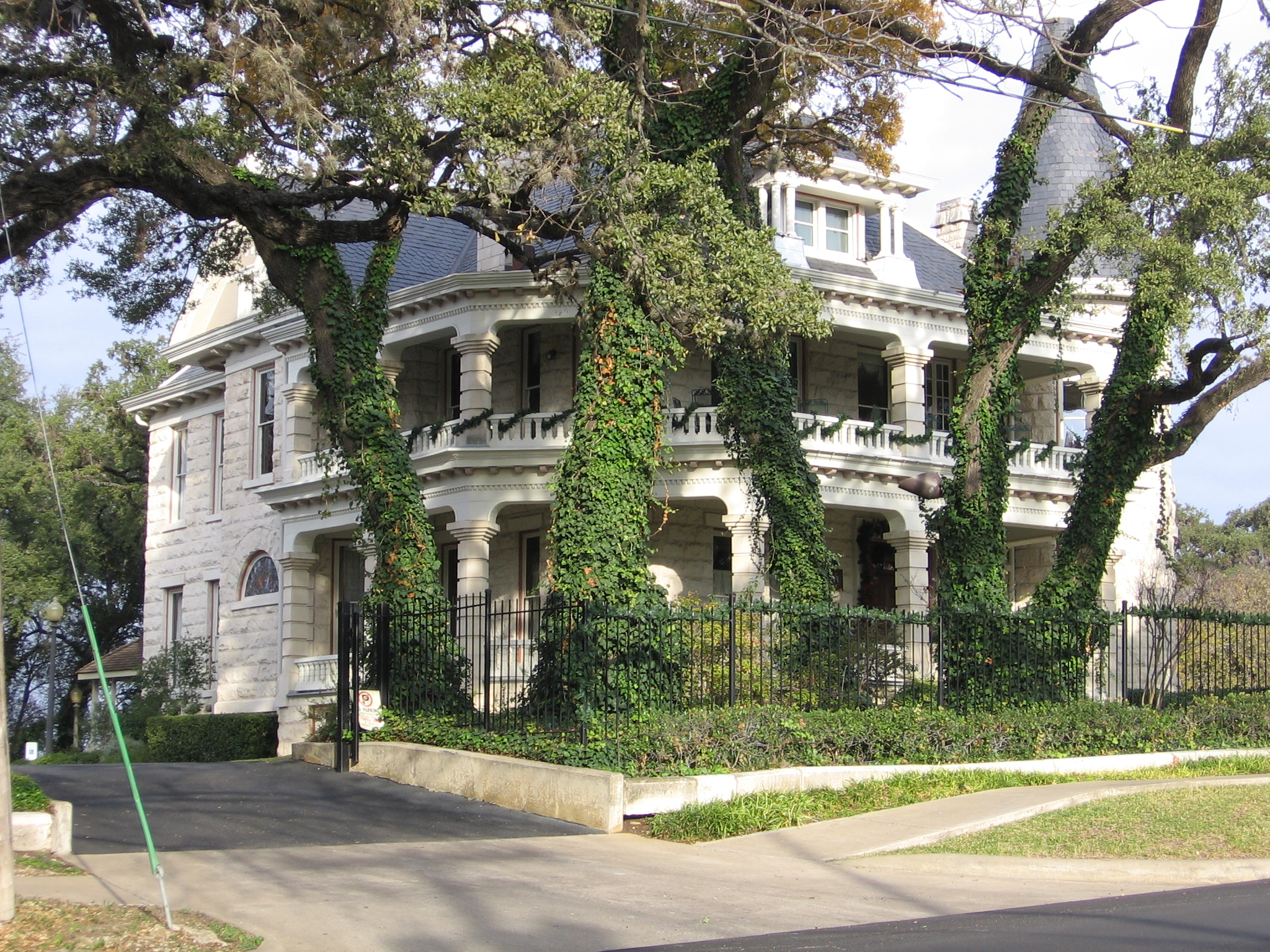

- Location within Texas Location within the United States
- Location: 1404 and 1502 West Ave., Austin, Texas
- Coordinates: 30°16′45″N 97°44′51″W
- Area: 0.5 acres (0.20 ha)
- Built: 1900
- Architectural style: Classical Revival, Renaissance, Chateauesque
- NRHP reference No.: 75002004
- RTHL No.: 6454

Significant dates
- Added to NRHP: April 21, 1975
- Designated RTHL: 1984

The Daniel H. and William T. Caswell Houses are two historic homes in downtown Austin, Texas completed near the turn of the 20th century.

The buildings are located at 1404 and 1502 West Avenue, respectively. The Daniel H. Caswell House is home to the Austin Junior Forum, a volunteer organization. The William T. Caswell House is used for office space. Both were added to the National Register of Historic Places in 1975.

== Texas Historical Commission Marker Text (Daniel H. Caswell House) ==
Daniel H. Caswell came to Austin from Nashville, Tennessee, about 1895. He purchased a cotton oil manufacturing company, bought and sold cotton, and in 1899 built a cotton gin. When completed for his family in 1900, this house was located in the far northwest corner of the city. The Caswell house, which exhibits influences of late Victorian, Colonial Revival, and Chateauesque style, features a corner turret and porches supported on rusticated piers. Recorded Texas Historic Landmark-1984

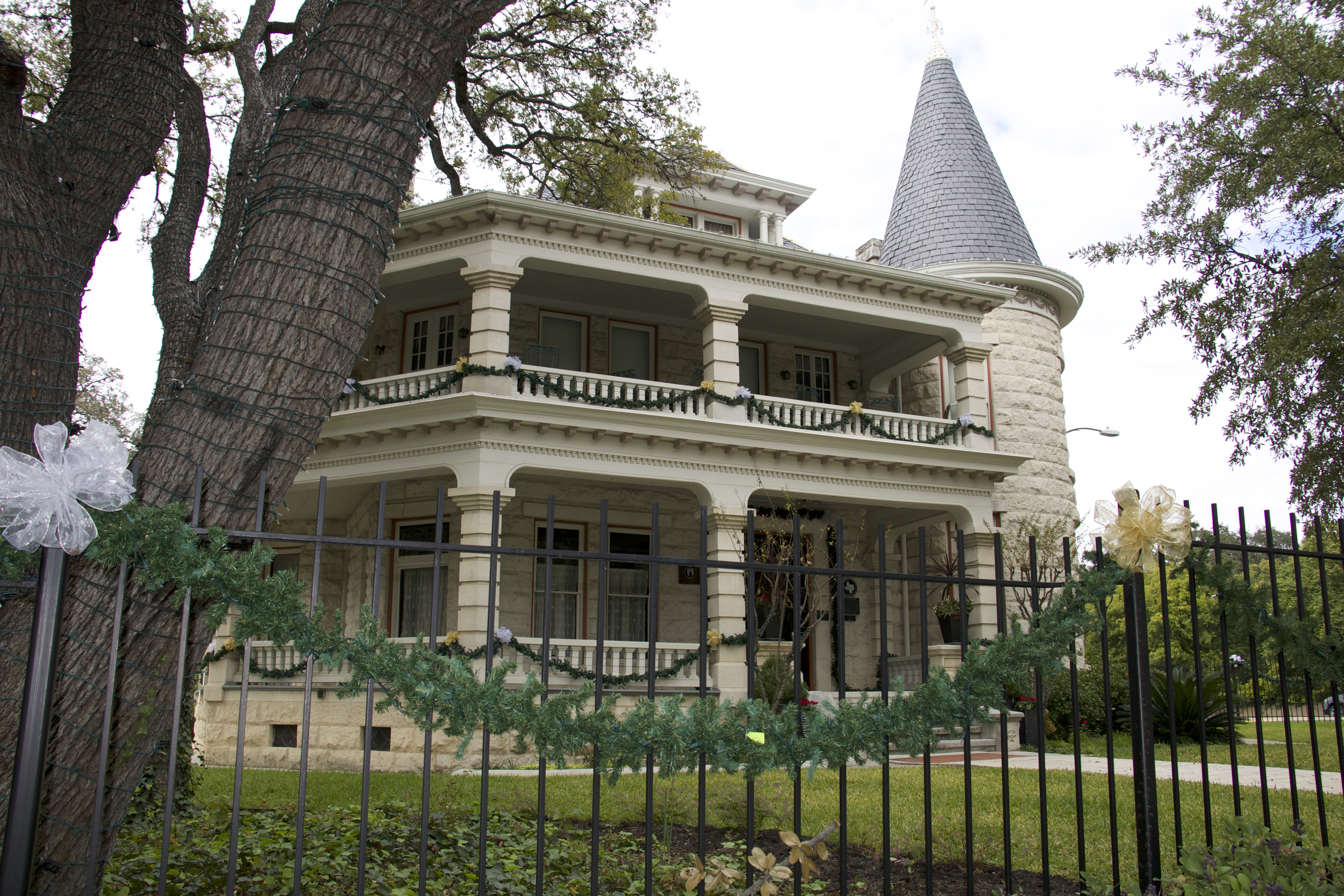
Daniel H. Caswell Housel, Austin, TX

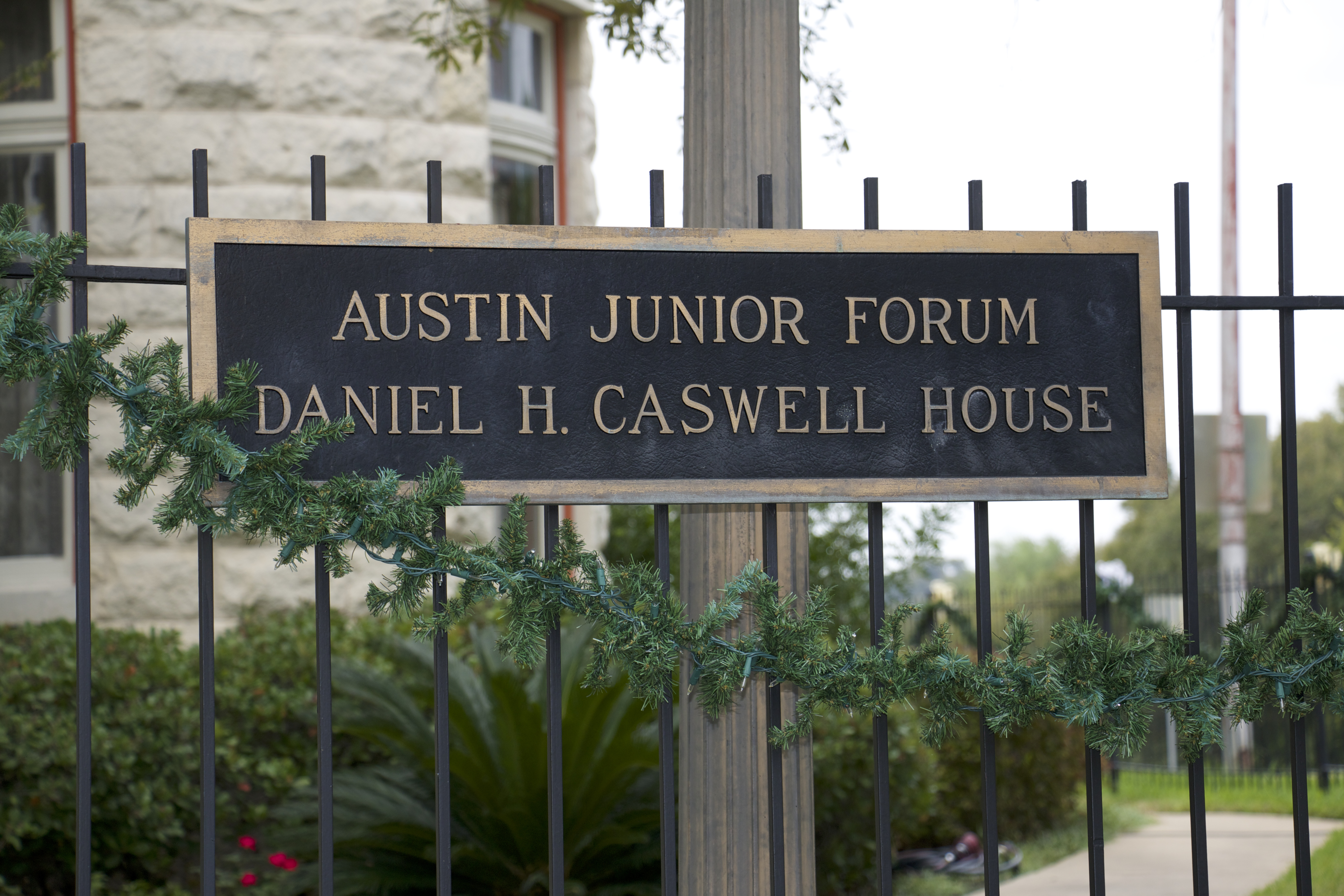
Daniel H. Caswell Housel, Austin, TX

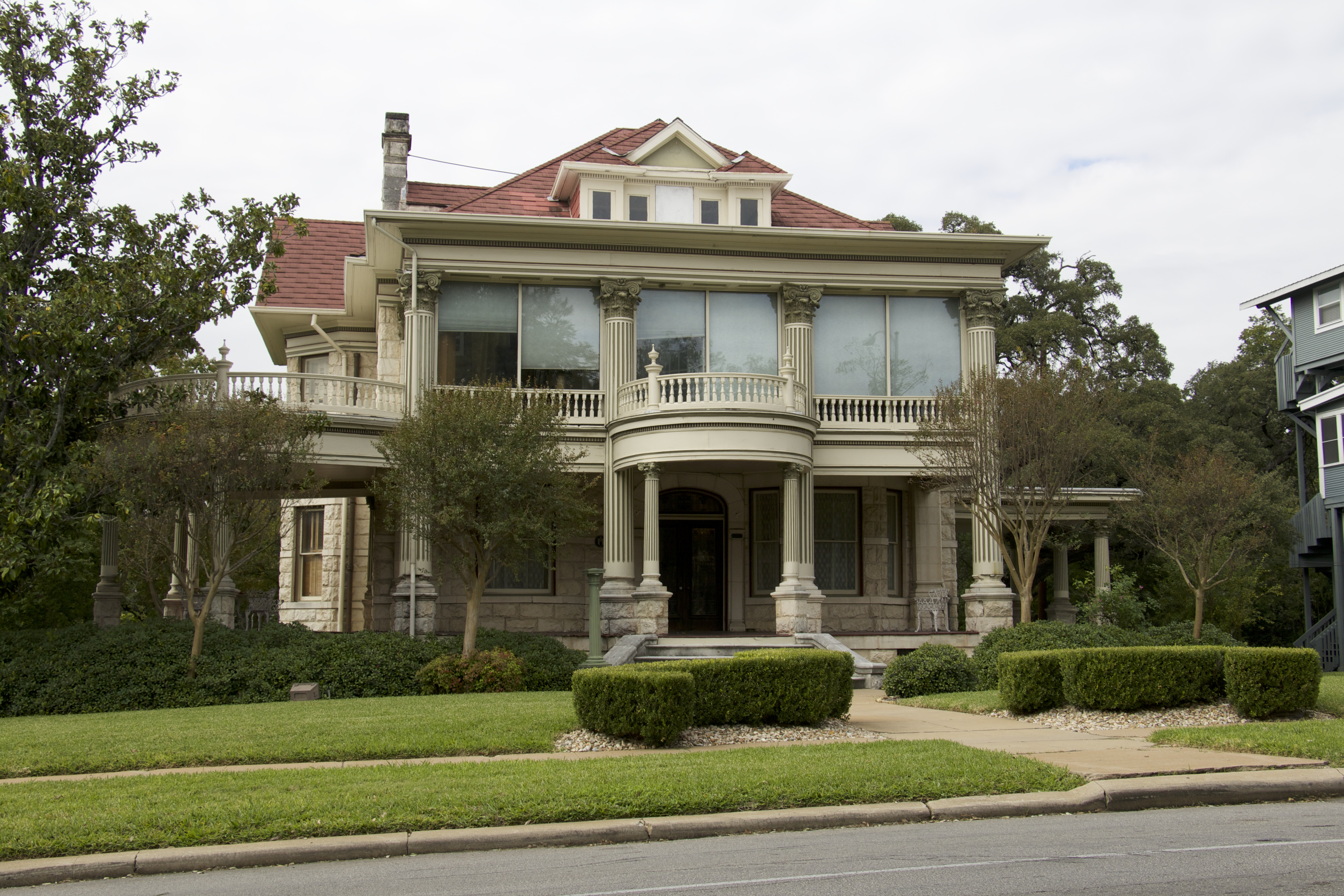
William T. Caswell House, Austin, TX
