= Troy, Michigan =

- City
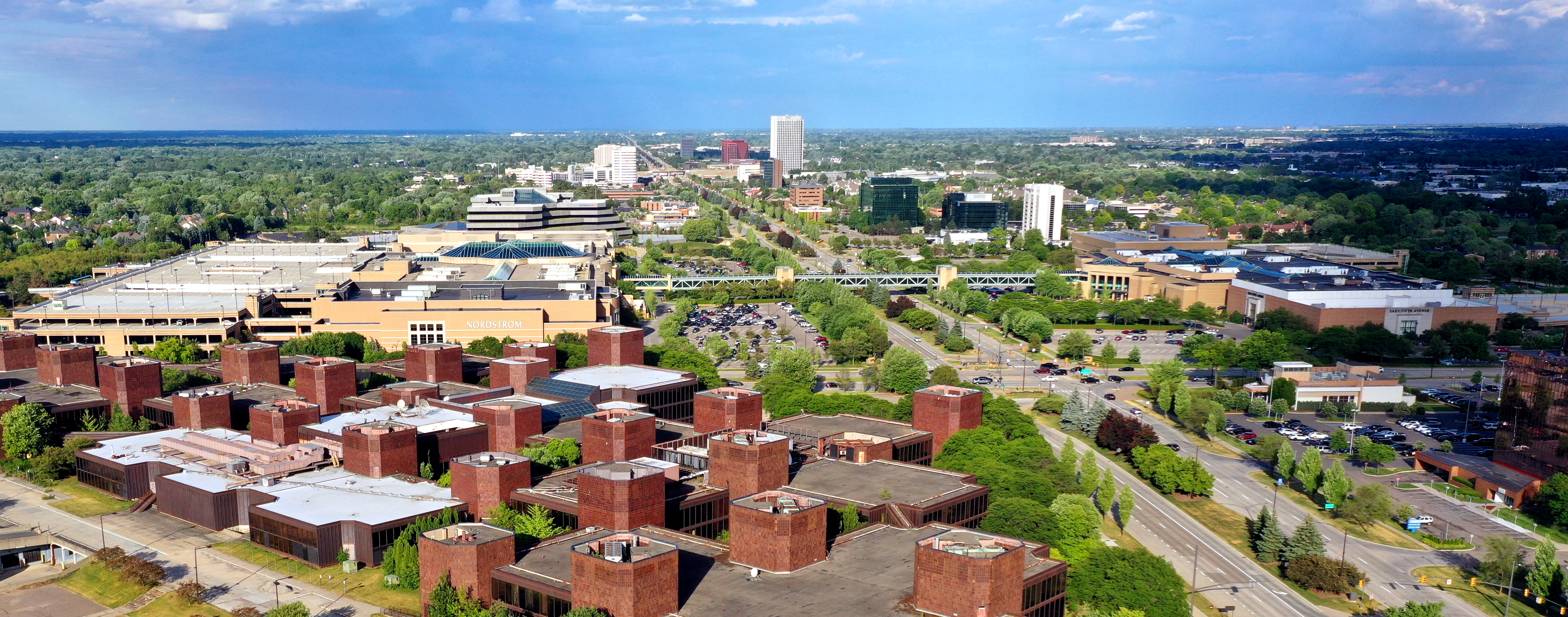
- View of the business district alongside Big Beaver Road

- Flag Seal Logo
- Motto: The City of Tomorrow, Today
- Interactive map of Troy, Michigan
- Location within the state of Michigan Location within the United States
- Coordinates: 42°34′49″N 83°08′35″W
- Country: United States
- State: Michigan
- County: Oakland
- Settled: 1819
- Organized: 1827 (as Troy Township)
- Incorporated: 1955
- Named for: Troy, New York

Government
  - Type: Council–manager
  - Mayor: Ethan Baker (R)
  - Manager: Frank Nastasi

Area
  - City: 33.63 sq mi (87.10 km^{2})
  - Land: 33.45 sq mi (86.63 km^{2})
  - Water: 0.18 sq mi (0.47 km^{2})
- Elevation: 748 ft (228 m)

Population (2020)
  - City: 87,294
  - Density: 2,609.9/sq mi (1,007.69/km^{2})
  - Metro: 4,296,250 (Metro Detroit)
- Time zone: UTC−5 (EST)
  - Summer (DST): UTC−4 (EDT)
- ZIP Codes: 48007, 48083–48085, 48098, 48099
- Area codes: 248 and 947
- FIPS code: 26-80700
- GNIS feature ID: 1615125
- Website: troymi.gov

Troy is a city in Oakland County in the U.S. state of Michigan. A northern suburb of Detroit, Troy is located about 15 miles (24 km) north of downtown Detroit. As of the 2020 census, the city had a population of 87,294; this makes Troy the largest community in Oakland County and 13th-most populous municipality in the state.

Troy was organized as a township in 1827. Sections of the township were later incorporated into the cities of Birmingham, Clawson, and Royal Oak. The remainder of the township was incorporated as the city of Troy in 1955.

== History ==
The earliest recorded purchases of land in what was known as Troy Township occurred in 1819. A couple of years later, a settlement known as Troy Corners was established due to Johnson Niles buying 160 acres in the region. The area is currently the north-central area of Troy. In 1827, Troy Township was established. In 1955, Troy was officially incorporated primarily as a strategy for preventing border cities from taking more land. This also helped to establish more robust city services for Troy residents, whose numbers increased rapidly during this time due to Detroiters fleeing the city for the surrounding suburbs.

It was named after Troy, New York and the ancient city of Troy as many of the early settlers, as in much of Michigan, originated from New York.

== Geography ==
According to the United States Census Bureau, the city has a total area of 33.64 square miles (87.13 km^{2}), of which 33.47 square miles (86.69 km^{2}) is land and 0.17 square miles (0.44 km^{2}) (0.51%) is water.

=== Climate ===
Climate data for Troy, Michigan (48098)
Month	Jan	Feb	Mar	Apr	May	Jun	Jul	Aug	Sep	Oct	Nov	Dec	Year
Record high °F (°C)	66 (19)	71 (22)	78 (26)	87 (31)	92 (33)	102 (39)	104 (40)	101 (38)	98 (37)	90 (32)	79 (26)	64 (18)	104 (40)
Mean daily maximum °F (°C)	34 (1)	35 (2)	46 (8)	60 (16)	72 (22)	81 (27)	85 (29)	83 (28)	76 (24)	63 (17)	50 (10)	38 (3)	60 (16)
Mean daily minimum °F (°C)	22 (−6)	22 (−6)	30 (−1)	40 (4)	52 (11)	62 (17)	66 (19)	65 (18)	58 (14)	47 (8)	36 (2)	28 (−2)	44 (7)
Record low °F (°C)	−21 (−29)	−12 (−24)	−5 (−21)	8 (−13)	24 (−4)	34 (1)	41 (5)	40 (4)	31 (−1)	19 (−7)	2 (−17)	−11 (−24)	−21 (−29)
Average precipitation inches (mm)	1.77 (45)	2.02 (51)	2.18 (55)	2.75 (70)	3.16 (80)	3.25 (83)	2.86 (73)	2.88 (73)	3.10 (79)	2.97 (75)	2.75 (70)	2.20 (56)	31.89 (810)
Source: Intellicast

== Demographics ==
Historical population
Census	Pop.	Note	%±
1960	19,402		—
1970	39,419		103.2%
1980	67,102		70.2%
1990	72,884		8.6%
2000	80,959		11.1%
2010	80,980		0.0%
2020	87,294		7.8%
2025 (est.)	88,733		1.6%
U.S. Decennial Census; 2018 Estimate

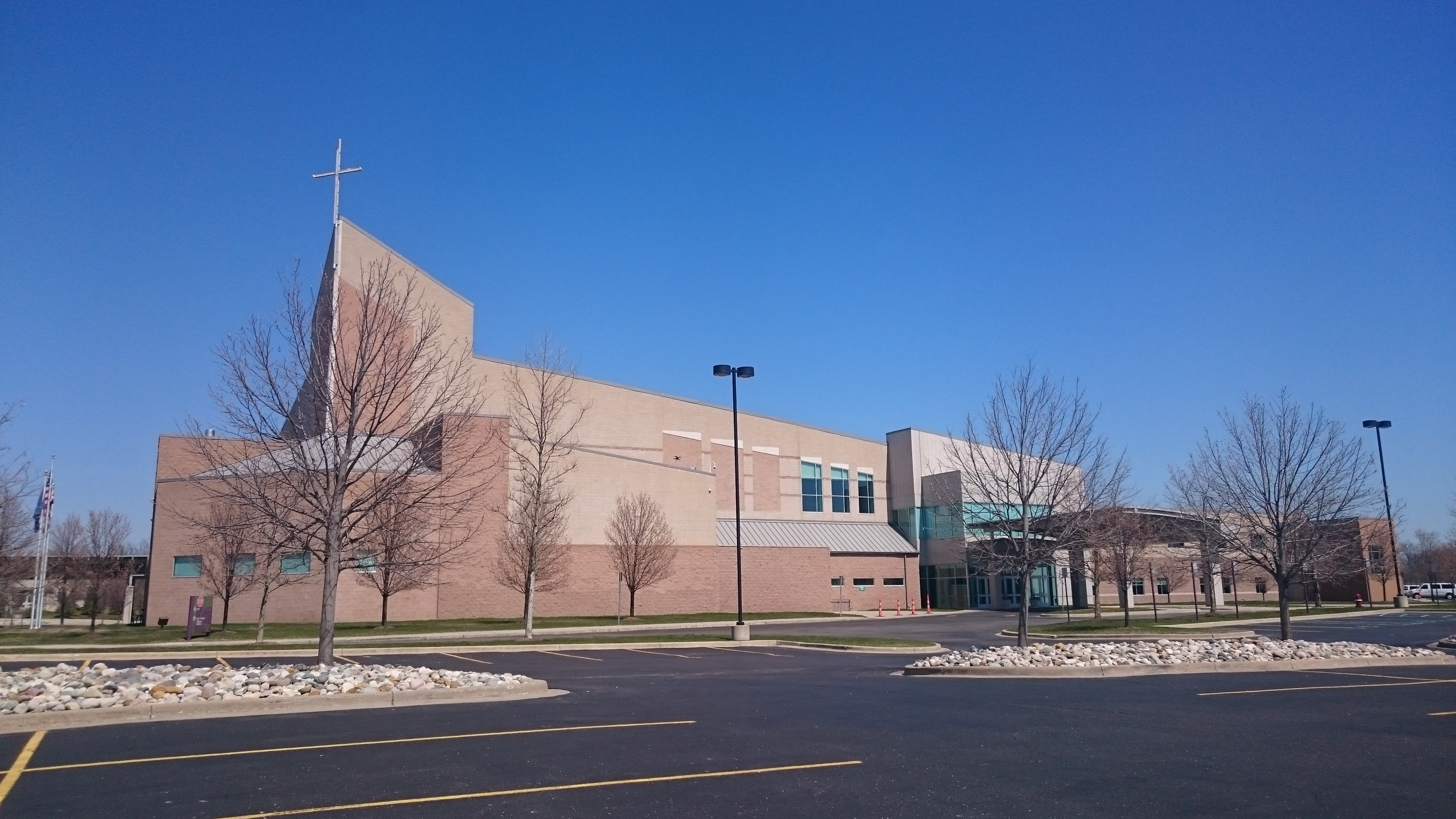
Woodside Bible Church

According to a 2018 estimate, the median income for a household in the city was $96,864, and the median income for a family was $113,640. Males had a median income of $72,005 versus $52,365 for females. The per capita income for the city was $46,664. About 5.1% of families and 7.2% of the population were below the poverty line, including 6.7% of those under age 18 and 6.1% of those age 65 or over.

=== Racial and ethnic composition ===
Troy, Michigan – Racial and ethnic composition Note: the US Census treats Hispanic/Latino as an ethnic category. This table excludes Latinos from the racial categories and assigns them to a separate category. Hispanics/Latinos may be of any race.
Race / Ethnicity (NH = Non-Hispanic)	Pop 2000	Pop 2010	Pop 2020	% 2000	% 2010	% 2020
White alone (NH)	65,809	58,869	53,793	81.29%	72.70%	61.62%
Black or African American alone (NH)	1,678	3,210	3,422	2.07%	3.96%	3.92%
Native American or Alaska Native alone (NH)	105	124	108	0.13%	0.15%	0.12%
Asian alone (NH)	10,713	15,439	23,788	13.23%	19.07%	27.25%
Native Hawaiian or Pacific Islander alone (NH)	18	1	9	0.02%	0.00%	0.01%
Other race alone (NH)	79	125	312	0.10%	0.15%	0.36%
Mixed race or Multiracial (NH)	1,373	1,502	2,908	1.70%	1.85%	3.33%
Hispanic or Latino (any race)	1,184	1,710	2,954	1.46%	2.11%	3.38%
Total	80,959	80,980	87,294	100.00%	100.00%	100.00%

=== 2020 census ===
As of the 2020 census, Troy had a population of 87,294. The population density was 2,609.9 inhabitants per square mile (1,007.7/km^{2}). There were 32,961 households, and 24,300 families living in the city.

The median age was 41.6 years. 22.1% of residents were under the age of 18 and 18.3% of residents were 65 years of age or older. For every 100 females there were 98.9 males, and for every 100 females age 18 and over there were 96.5 males age 18 and over.

Of the city's 32,961 households, 33.0% had children under the age of 18 living in them. Of all households, 61.3% were married-couple households, 15.1% were households with a male householder and no spouse or partner present, and 20.6% were households with a female householder and no spouse or partner present. About 23.9% of all households were made up of individuals and 11.1% had someone living alone who was 65 years of age or older. The average household size was 2.56 and the average family size was 3.05.

There were 34,488 housing units, of which 4.4% were vacant. The homeowner vacancy rate was 0.7% and the rental vacancy rate was 8.4%.

100.0% of residents lived in urban areas, while 0.0% lived in rural areas.

Racial composition as of the 2020 census
Race	Number	Percent
White	54,299	62.2%
Black or African American	3,484	4.0%
American Indian and Alaska Native	150	0.2%
Asian	23,805	27.3%
Native Hawaiian and Other Pacific Islander	9	0.0%
Some other race	1,088	1.2%
Two or more races	4,459	5.1%

=== 2010 census ===
As of the census of 2010, there were 80,980 people, 30,703 households, and 22,443 families living in the city. The population density was 2,419.5 inhabitants per square mile (934.2/km^{2}). There were 32,907 housing units at an average density of 983.2 per square mile (379.6/km^{2}). The racial makeup of the city was 74.1% White, 4.0% African American, 0.2% Native American, 19.1% Asian, 0.6% from other races, and 2.0% from two or more races. Hispanic or Latino residents of any race were 2.1% of the population.

There were 30,703 households, of which 34.7% had children under the age of 18 living with them, 62.8% were married couples living together, 7.3% had a female householder with no husband present, 3.0% had a male householder with no wife present, and 26.9% were non-families. 23.4% of all households were made up of individuals, and 9.6% had someone living alone who was 65 years of age or older. The average household size was 2.63 and the average family size was 3.14.

The median age in the city was 41.8 years. 23.8% of residents were under the age of 18; 6.7% were between the ages of 18 and 24; 24% were from 25 to 44; 31.6% were from 45 to 64; and 13.8% were 65 years of age or older. The gender makeup of the city was 49.3% male and 50.7% female.

=== 2000 census ===
From the census of 2000, there were 80,959 people, 30,018 households, and 21,883 families living in the city. The population density was 2,413.9 inhabitants per square mile (932.0/km^{2}). There were 30,872 housing units at an average density of 920.5 per square mile (355.4/km^{2}). The racial makeup of the city was 82.30% White, 2.09% African American, 0.15% Native American, 13.25% Asian, 0.02% Pacific Islander, 0.36% from other races, and 1.82% from two or more races. 1.46% of the population was Hispanic or Latino of any race.

There were 30,018 households, out of which 36.9% had children under the age of 18 living with them, 64.5% were married couples living together, 6.0% had a female householder with no husband present, and 27.1% were non-families. 22.8% of all households were made up of individuals, and 7.8% had someone living alone who was 65 years of age or older. The average household size was 2.69 and the average family size was 3.23.

In the city 26.2% of the population was under the age of 18, 6.7% from 18 to 24, 29.8% from 25 to 44, 27.1% from 45 to 64, and 10.2% who were 65 years of age or older. The median age was 38 years. For every 100 females, there were 98.1 males. For every 100 females age 18 and over, there were 94.8 males.

From 1990 to 2000, of all of the municipalities in Oakland, Wayne, and Macomb counties, Troy had the highest numeric growth in the Asian population. It had 4,932 Asians according to the 1990 U.S. Census and 10,730 according to the 2000 U.S. Census, an increase of 5,798. The increase gave Troy the largest Asian-American population in the tri-county area, surpassing that of Detroit.

== Economy ==
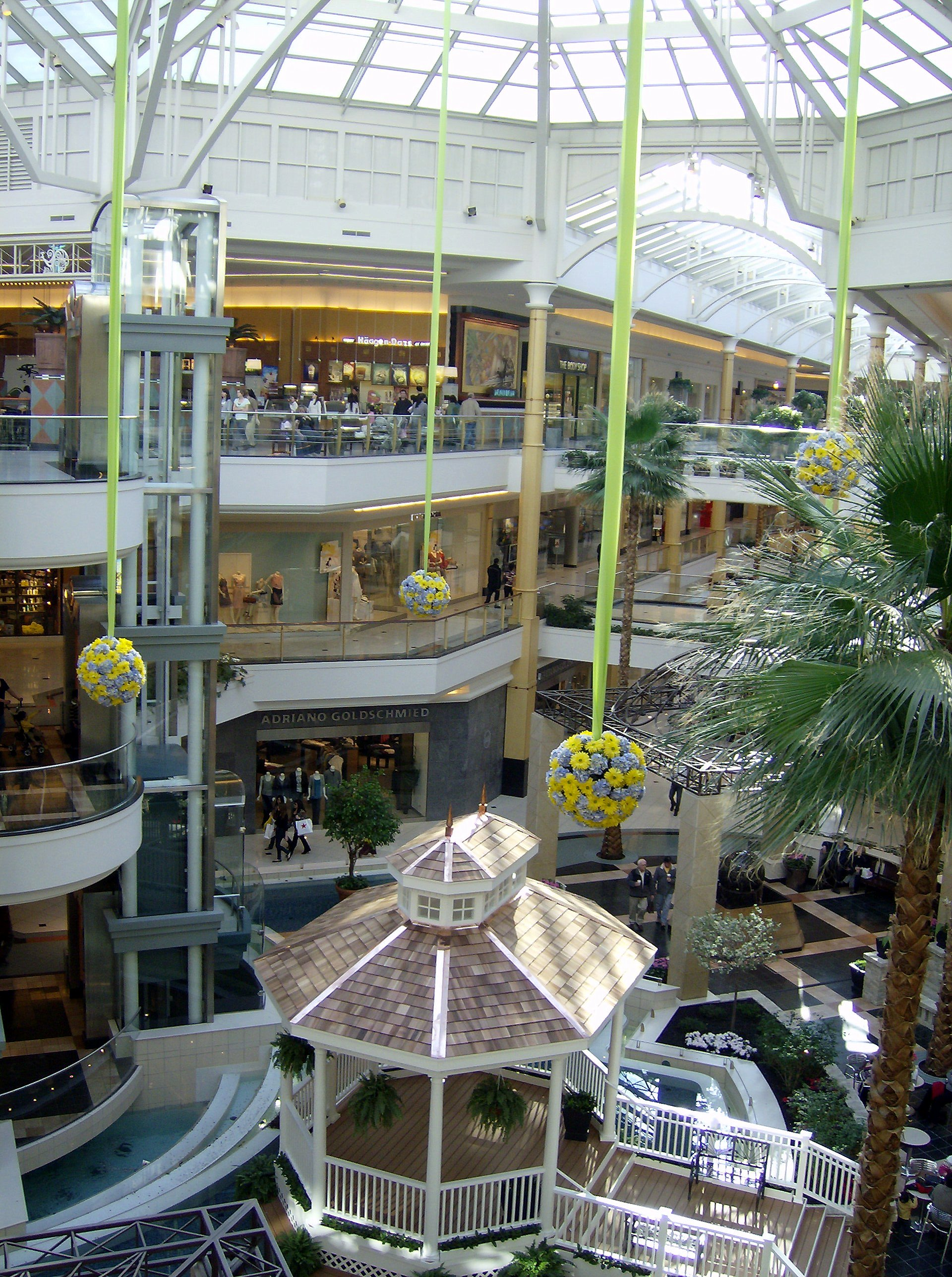
Somerset Collection is a shopping mall located in Troy.

Troy is a center of business, particularly in the automotive and financial sectors. Troy has the second-highest cumulative property value in Michigan, second only to Detroit. Troy is home to the Somerset Collection mall, featuring a skywalk and over 180 stores, and the Oakland Mall. The Top of Troy is the city's tallest building with offices of PNC Financial Services.

In 2012 Mahindra & Mahindra opened a technical center in Troy.

=== Major companies ===
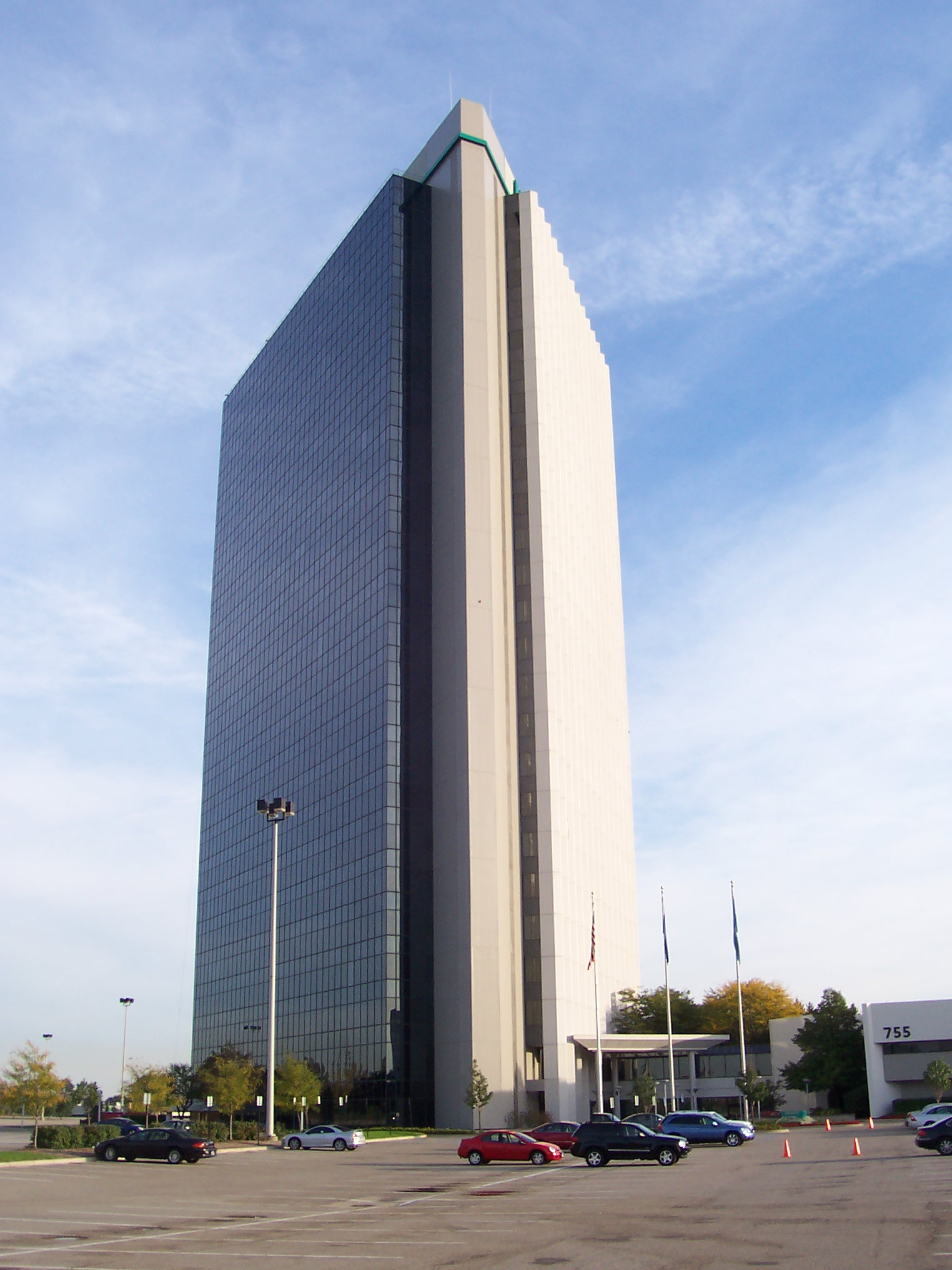
The Top of Troy is the tallest building in the city.

- Aptiv
- Altair Engineering
- Behr America
- Canadian National Railway (Traded as Grand Trunk Western)
- Champion Homes
- Flagstar Bank
- Inteva Products
- J. D. Power and Associates
- Kelly Services
- The Kresge Foundation
- Magna Powertrain
- Meritor
- North American Bancard
- Olga's Kitchen
- Plex Systems
- Rexair
- Saleen Special Vehicles
- SRG Global
- Syntel
- Talascend
- Tyler Technologies
- ViSalus
- Ziebart
- HTC Global Services

Arbor Drugs was headquartered in Troy until it was acquired by CVS Corporation in 1998. Frank's Nursery & Crafts was an arts and crafts chain headquartered in Troy. Kmart was headquartered in Troy until it acquired Sears in 2005. Its former headquarters is 3100 W. Big Beaver Road.

== Arts and culture ==
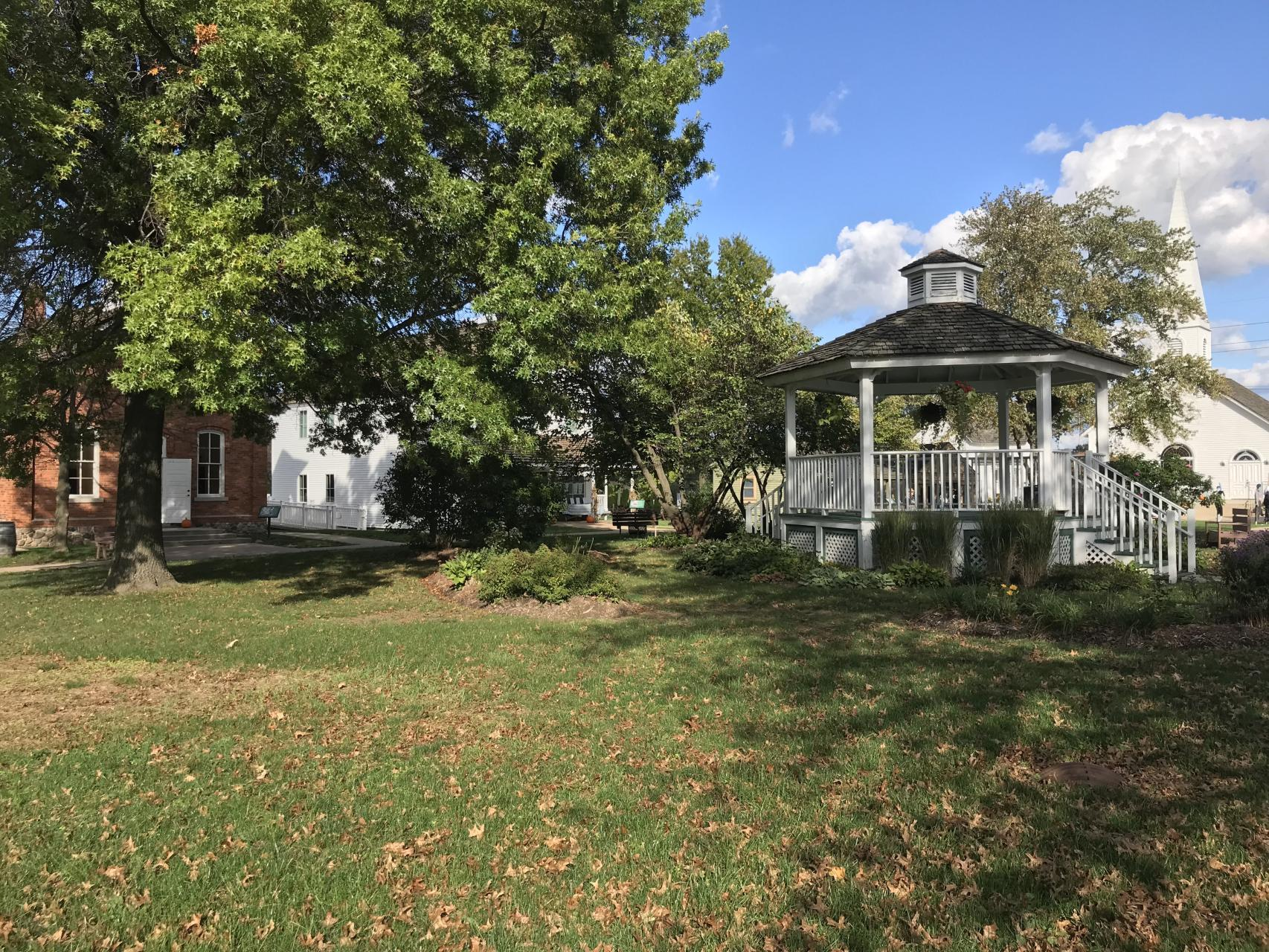
Troy Historic Village

The Troy Historic Village is a collection of historical museums and structures chronicling Troy's history. The village has ten extant structures which patrons may enter and observe, including an 18th-century schoolhouse and estate, a general store, a blacksmith's shop, a church and pastor's home, and the old city hall.

Kensington Community Church and Woodside Bible Church are two of the largest Protestant churches in the United States. The Greek Orthodox Archdiocese of America Metropolis of Detroit is headquartered in Troy.

== Government ==
Troy uses the council–manager form of government, and thus is governed by a city council consisting of a mayor and six council members. The current mayor is Ethan Baker, who was elected to a four-year term on November 5, 2019. The city council appoints a City Manager, who manages the day-to-day operations of the city.

=== Federal, state, and county legislators ===
United States House of Representatives
District	Representative	Party	Since
11th	Haley Stevens	Democratic	2019

Michigan Senate
District	Senator	Party	Since
3rd	Stephanie Chang	Democratic	2023
9th	Michael Webber	Republican	2023

Michigan House of Representatives
District	Representative	Party	Since
56th	Sharon MacDonnell	Democratic	2023
57th	Thomas Kuhn	Republican	2023

Oakland County Board of Commissioners
District	Commissioner	Party	Since
1	Dave Woodward	Democratic	2005
2	Penny Luebs	Democratic	2019
3	Ann Erickson Gault	Democratic	2023

== Education ==
=== Colleges and universities ===
Troy is the location of Walsh College, a business school, as well as branches of the University of Phoenix, Northwood University, Central Michigan University, Spring Arbor University, International Academy of Design and Technology, and Michigan State University.

=== Primary and secondary schools ===
There are seven school districts serving Troy; however, Troy School District serves the majority of the city limits. The district has twelve elementary schools, four middle schools, and two zoned high schools: Troy High School and Athens High School.

Three school districts have sizable portions of territory in Troy and operate at least one elementary school within the city: Avondale School District, in the north and northwestmost portion of the city; Birmingham City School District, in the southwestmost portion; and Warren Consolidated Schools, in the southeast, which operates Susick Elementary within the city. In addition, two other school districts are located in part in Troy but have no schools within the city limits: Bloomfield Hills School District, with a portion of the northwest part of the city, and Royal Oak School District, which has a very small portion of the southern part of the city. Finally, a small area of commercial property also in the south lies within the borders of Lamphere Public Schools

The Troy School District also hosts the eastern campus of the International Academy. Private schools include Bethany Christian School, Brookfield Academy, Oakland Children's Academy, St. Mark Christian Academy and Troy Adventist Academy.

== Media ==
In addition to The Detroit News and Detroit Free Press, regional newspapers serving all of southeast Michigan, the city is served by the Daily Tribune (published daily), the Observer & Eccentric (which is published twice a week), the Troy Beacon (published every Thursday), the Troy Times, and the Troy-Somerset Gazette and, most recently, Troy Patch. The Troy Eccentric newspaper edition ceased publication in 2009.

== Transportation ==
Oakland-Troy Airport is a general aviation airport operated by Oakland County. It has a single 3,550 by 60 feet (1,082 m × 18 m) paved runway and is described as an "executive" airport. It is located close to business, recreation and entertainment facilities.

Troy Transit Center is located near the Oakland-Troy Airport and is served by Amtrak's Wolverine train and municipal buses.

Big Beaver Airport operated in Troy from 1946 to 1995, and closed due to declining use and pressure to sell the land for commercial development.

Interstate 75 passes through Troy.

== Notable people ==
- Ken Appledorn, actor
- Jon Berti, professional baseball player for the Chicago Cubs, born in Troy
- George Blaha, play-by-play announcer, Detroit Pistons
- Chan-Jin Chung, professor and founder of Robofest
- Chuck Collins, philanthropist and author
- Sean Collins, NHL defenseman for the Washington Capitals
- Marisa DiGrande, soccer player
- Rick Ferrell, Hall of Fame baseball player, lived in Troy
- Hunter Foster, Tony Award-nominated Broadway actor/singer
- Sutton Foster, Tony Award-winning actress, singer and dancer
- Kenny Goins, basketball player for Atomerőmű SE, formerly played for Michigan State
- Ellen Hollman, film and television actress
- Robert J. Huber, mayor of Troy from 1959 to 1964, state senator and congressman
- Christopher W. Jones Chemical Engineer. Researcher of catalysis and carbon dioxide capture.
- Ron Keselowski, racing driver
- Martin Klebba, actor, known from the Pirates of the Caribbean films and Scrubs
- Haley Kopmeyer, former goalkeeper for Seattle Reign FC
- Taylor Kornieck, soccer player for San Diego Wave FC and the United States national team
- Steve McCatty, former MLB pitcher and coach
- Ivana Miličević, television and film actress
- Tomo Miličević, guitarist, Thirty Seconds to Mars
- Bridget Regan, musician, Flogging Molly
- Rucka Rucka Ali, rapper best known for black comedy style parody songs on YouTube
- Israa Seblani, Lebanese doctor and survivor of the 2020 Beirut explosion
- Hugh W. Sloan Jr., Watergate figure
- Natalie Viggiano, soccer player
- Carolyn Warmus, high-profile killer
- We Came as Romans, rock band
- Steven Yeun, Academy Award-nominated actor, known for his role in The Walking Dead
- William G. Gravlin, serial killer

== See also ==
- Oakland County, Michigan
- Birmingham, Michigan
- Bloomfield Hills, Michigan
- Rochester Hills, Michigan
- Sterling Heights, Michigan
- Athens High School (Troy, Michigan)
- Troy High School (Michigan)
