= 1914–15 Michigan State Normal Normalites men's basketball team =

American college basketball season

1914–15 Michigan State Normal Normalites men's basketball

Normal Champions
- Conference: Independent
- Record: 10–4
- Head coach: Thomas Ransom (1st season)
- Home arena: Gymnasium

The 1914–15 team finished with a record of 9–4. It was the 1st and only year for head coach Thomas Ransom. The team captain was Ernest Rynearson. The team was the Normal Champions.

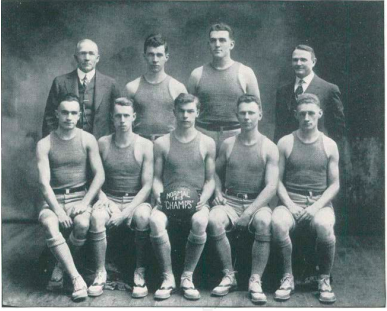
1914-1915 EMU Basketball Team Picture

== Roster ==
Number	Name	Position	Class	Hometown
	Herbert Moore	Center	Graduate Student	Toledo, OH
	Ernest Rynearson	Forward		Ypsilanti, MI
	Franklin Armstrong	Forward		
	Glen H. Fraser	Guard	Senior	Lakeview, MI
	Howard Pearl	Guard	Senior	Grand Rapids, MI
	George Meade	Substitute	Junior	Ypsilanti, MI
	Thurman M. Clay		Senior	Paulding, OH
	Albert Clifford McMullin		Senior	Ypsilanti, MI
	Arthur G. Straub		Senior	Adrian, MI
	Carl A. Straub		Senior	Adrian, MI

== Schedule ==
Date time, TV	Rank^{#}	Opponent^{#}	Result	Record	Site (attendance) city, state
Non-conference regular season
January 9, 1915*		at Detroit College of Law	W 38-24	1-0	Detroit, MI
January 15, 1914*		at Polish Seminary	L 29-42	1-1	Orchard Lake Gymnasium; Orchard Lake Village, MI
January 22, 1915*		St. John's (Ohio)	W 38-21	2-1	Gymnasium; Ypsilanti, MI
February 3, 1915*		Polish Seminary	L 24-30	2-2	Gymnasium; Ypsilanti, MI
1915*		St. Mary's	L 24-32	2-3	Gymnasium; Ypsilanti, MI
February 6, 1915*		at Hillsdale College	W 42-21	3-3	Hillsdale, MI
February 13, 1915*		at Defiance College	W 33-27	4-3	Defiance, OH
February 18, 1915*		Western Michigan	W 37-24	5-3	Kalamazoo, MI
1915*		Battle Creek	W 45-29	6-3	Gymnasium; Ypsilanti, MI
1915*		Defiance College	W 63-32	7-3	Gymnasium; Ypsilanti, MI
February 20, 1915*		at Adrian College	W 51-35	8-3	Adrian, MI
February 26, 1915*		at Western Michigan	W 37-24	9-3	East Hall Gymnasium; Kalamazoo, MI
February 27, 1915*		at Battle Creek	L 26-48	9-4	Battle Creek, MI
March 6, 1915*		at Central Michigan	W 46-18	10-4	Mount Pleasant, MI
*Non-conference game. ^{#}Rankings from AP Poll. (#) Tournament seedings in parentheses. All times are in Eastern Time.

== Game Notes ==
=== January 9, 1915 ===
Media Guide schedule lists Detroit Central as the opponent.

=== February 3, 1915 ===
Aurora has the score 24–30.

=== 2nd Battle Creek Game ===
Aurora has score of 25–44.

=== 2nd Defiance Game ===
Defiance has score of 32–63 with a Defiance win.
