= St. Mary's Preparatory =

Private, co-divisional school in Orchard Lake Village, Michigan, United States

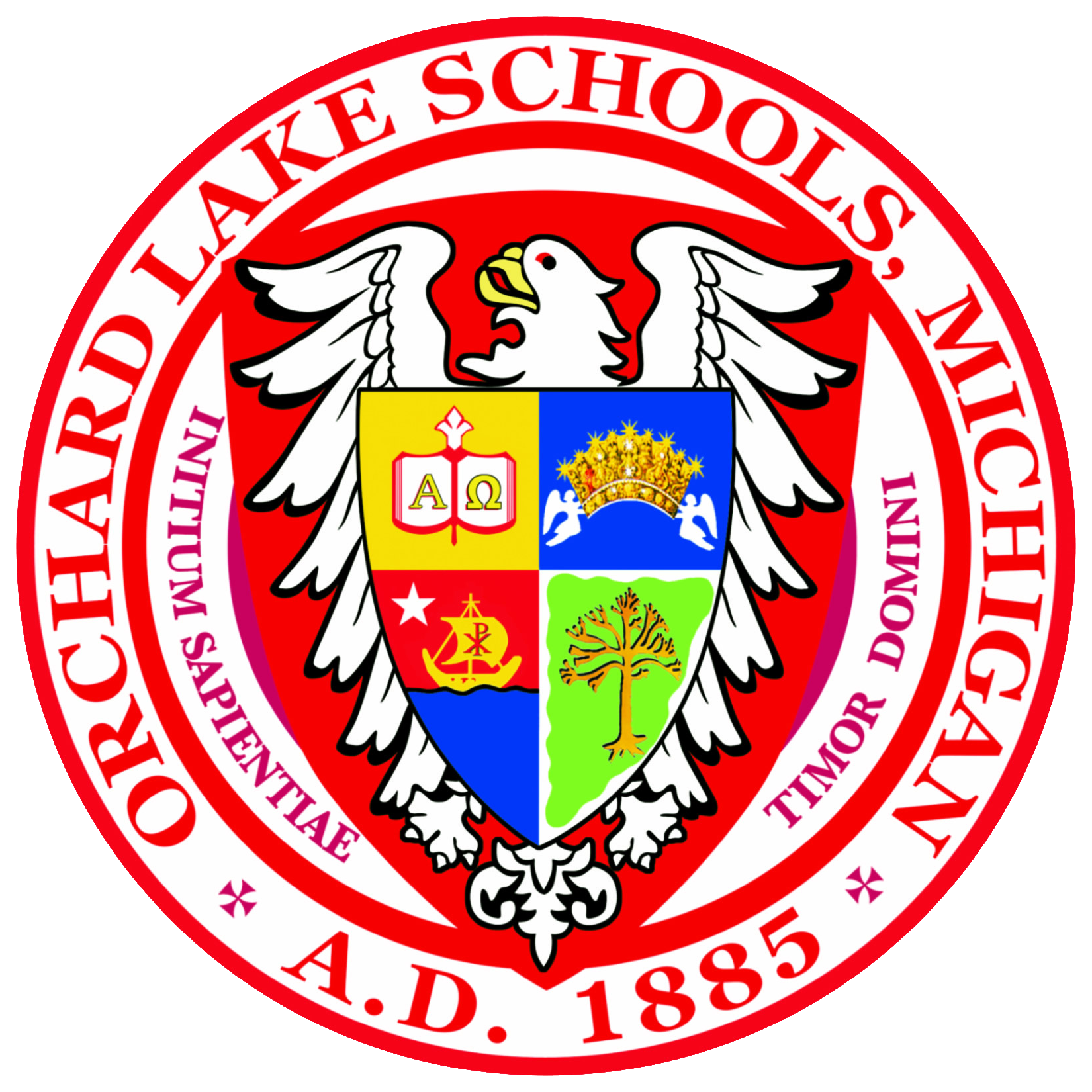

Location
- 3535 Commerce Road; Orchard Lake Village, Michigan 48324; United States

Information
- Type: Private, Co-divisional.
- Motto: "Initium Sapientiae Timor Domini" (The beginning of wisdom is the fear of God.)
- Religious affiliation: Roman Catholic
- Patron saint: St. Mary
- Established: 1885
- Founder: Joseph Dabrowski
- Headmaster: Bob Pyles
- Grades: 9–12
- Enrollment: 515 (2021)
- Student to teacher ratio: 13:1
- Campus size: 125 acres (51 ha)
- Campus type: Suburban/Rural
- Colors: Red, white and black
- Fight song: Hail Mary
- Athletics conference: Catholic High School League
- Nickname: Eaglets
- Accreditation: Michigan Non-Public Schools Accrediting Association
- Website: www.stmarysprep.com
- St. Mary's Preparatory
- U.S. Historic district – Contributing property
- Location within Michigan Location within the United States
- Location: Indian Trail, Orchard Lake, Michigan
- Coordinates: 42°35′38″N 83°21′28″W
- Architectural style: Gothic, Tudor Revival, Queen Anne
- Part of: Orchard Lake Schools Historic District (ID82002859)
- Designated CP: March 19, 1982

St. Mary's Preparatory, often referred to as Orchard Lake St. Mary's (OLSM) or St. Mary's Prep, is a Catholic college preparatory school located in Orchard Lake Village, Michigan. The school's stated core values are "God, Family, St. Mary's." St. Mary's classes are taught in a co-divisional education model and the school offers both day school and boarding school programs

== History ==
On January 14, 1879, Pope Leo XIII authorized the establishment of a seminary dedicated to training priests for Polish immigrant communities in the United States, following a petition by Rev. Leopold Moczygemba.

Initially known as "The Polish Seminary," the institution was officially founded in 1885 by Józef Dąbrowski, who became its first rector. It was originally located at 4671 St. Aubin Street in Detroit. Due to expanding enrollment, the seminary moved to the former campus of the Michigan Military Academy in Orchard Lake Village in 1909 under the leadership of Rev. Witold Buchaczkowski.

In 1927, the school reorganized into three separate institutions: SS. Cyril and Methodius Seminary, St. Mary's College (now a satellite campus of Madonna University), and St. Mary's Preparatory, collectively known as Orchard Lake Schools.

In 2020, St. Mary's transitioned to a co-divisional model by admitting female students. Classes are taught in single-sex classrooms, while extracurricular activities, clubs, sports, and arts programs are co-educational.

== Academics ==
St. Mary's Preparatory's academic program is designed to meet college entrance requirements. Graduation requirements include four years each of theology and English; four years of mathematics; three years each of science, social studies, and foreign language; and one semester each of computer programming, computer applications, physical education, health, fine arts, and speech. Students must earn 28 credits to graduate.

More than 60% of the school's 90 courses are offered at Honors or Advanced Placement (AP) levels.

St. Mary's is accredited by the Michigan Non-Public Schools Accrediting Association (MNSAA), the Archdiocese of Detroit, the Detroit Catholic League, Oakland Schools Consortium, and the Michigan High School Athletic Association (MHSAA).

== Campus and Student Life ==
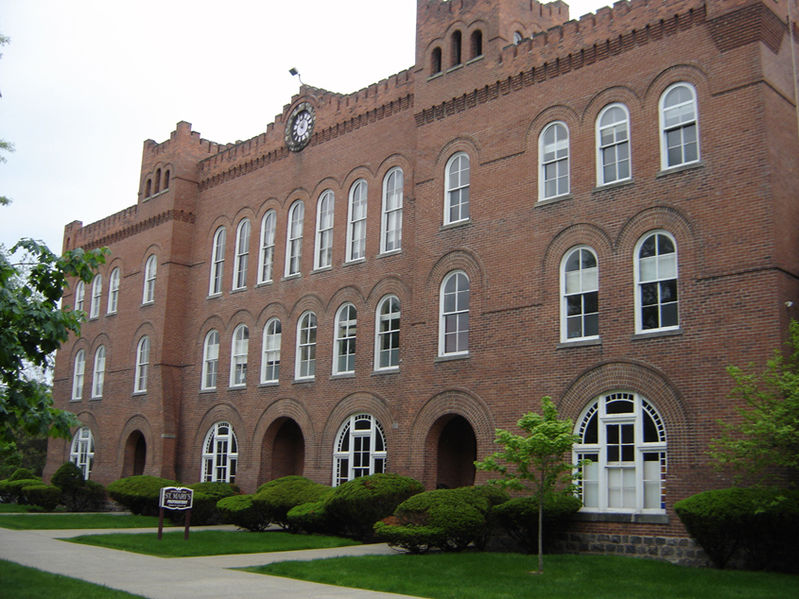
Main school building, originally part of the Michigan Military Academy.

St. Mary's Preparatory is noted for its unique historic campus, originally home to the Michigan Military Academy. Key historical buildings include the administration building, known as "The Castle," originally constructed as a mansion overlooking Orchard Lake for Joseph Tarr Copeland, the founder of the Michigan Military Academy. The campus also houses the Chapel of Our Lady of Orchard Lake, the official Archdiocesan Shrine for St. John Paul II, who visited campus and said mass at the Chapel in 1969 and 1976 while serving as the Archbishop of Krakow.

In addition to historic buildings, the campus offers modern athletic and recreational facilities, including a hockey arena, multiple gymnasiums (one of which was originally a riding stable for Michigan Military Academy cadets), weight rooms, multiple baseball and softball stadiums, a wrestling room and a crew boathouse on Orchard Lake.

Athletics play a significant role, with St. Mary's competing in MHSAA Divisions I, II, and III. Traditional rivals include Brother Rice, Detroit Catholic Central High School, and Detroit Country Day School. St. Mary's has achieved 41 state championships across various sports as of 2019.

== Museums ==
The campus includes the Polish Home Army Museum and numerous other collections highlighting Polish military and cultural history, housed primarily in the Ark Building. These museums open to the public on the first Sunday of each month ("Polish Sundays").

== Boarding Program ==
St. Mary's Preparatory provides boarding options for both five-day and seven-day resident students.

== Notable alumni ==
- Walter Ciszek, Jesuit priest and missionary, Servant of God
- Adam Joseph Maida – Cardinal Archbishop of Detroit (1990–2009); created cardinal by Pope John Paul II in 1994.
- Jay Penske – Founder and CEO of Penske Media Corporation; owner of Dragon/Penske Autosport Formula E team.
- Thomas John Paprocki – Bishop of Springfield since 2010; Orchard Lake Schools trustee.
- Stanley E. Milewski – Chancellor of Orchard Lake Schools (1977–2000) and namesake of Milewski Field.
- Walter J. Ziemba – Rector of SS. Cyril & Methodius Seminary (1969–1987) and longtime Orchard Lake historian.
- Thomas C. Machalski Jr. – Chancellor-Rector of Orchard Lake Schools (2012–2018); Catholic chaplain to the New York Mets.
- Stanley Ulman – Detroit-area priest and Polish-American community leader.
- Leonard F. Chrobot – Catholic priest, author and former president of St. Mary's College, Orchard Lake (Class of 1956).
- Lawrence W. Kulik – U.S. Air Force staff sergeant, decorated Vietnam War veteran, honored on the Vietnam Veterans Memorial Fund Roll of Honor (Class of 1968).
- Leonard S. Suchyta – Vice-president & Associate General Counsel for Intellectual Property, Verizon Communications (2000–2011).
- Joseph Majcher – Former mayor (and current councilman) of Orchard Lake Village; retired General Motors executive and engineer.
- Mac Watts – Nashville country singer-songwriter.
- Ludvik F. Koci – Former President & CEO, Detroit Diesel Allison Corp.; longtime Penske Corporation director.
- Walter Knysz, DDS – Founder of Great Expressions Dental Centers and UnifiedSmiles practice-management network.
- Timothy F. Whalen - Rector of Saint Vincent Seminary
- Boleslaus Goral - Professor, editor, Polish-language scholar
- Joseph T. Lentine – Founder and CEO of DENCAP Dental Plans; former CFO of Orchard Lake Schools.
- Remek Błaszkowski, J.C.D. – Canon lawyer; pastor of San Jose Parish (Jacksonville); former seminary vice-rector.
- Gary Michalik – Archdiocese of Detroit priest; veteran trustee and finance-committee member of Orchard Lake Schools.
- Leonard F. Chrobot – Academic dean (1968–1976) and president (1977–1987) of St. Mary's College; noted scholar of Polish-American studies.
- Jeff Petry, a professional ice hockey defenseman currently playing for the Florida Panthers of the National Hockey League (NHL)
- Austin Niemiec, Chief Revenue Officer of Rocket Mortgage
- Josh Bourke, a former Canadian football offensive lineman who spent the majority of his professional career with the Montreal Alouettes of the Canadian Football League (CFL)
- David Bowens, a former American football linebacker who played twelve seasons in the National Football League (NFL)
- Charles Davis, a former American football tight end
- Tommy Doman is a current American football punter for the Buffalo Bills of the NFL
- K. J. Hamler is a current American football wide receiver for the Buffalo Bills of the NFL
- Ralph Holley is a current American football defensive lineman for the Toronto Argonauts of the CFL
- Gary Ignasiak is a former Major League Baseball (MLB) player who played part of one season with the Detroit Tigers
- Mike Ignasiak, a former MLB pitcher who pitched parts of four seasons in the major leagues between 1991 and 1995, all for the Milwaukee Brewers
- Filmel Johnson is a former American football defensive back who played one season for the Buffalo Bills in the NFL
- Scott Kowalkowski is a former American football linebacker who played for the Philadelphia Eagles and the Detroit Lions in a ten-year career that lasted from 1991 to 2001 in the NFL
- Jim Paciorek, former professional baseball player
- Brock Porter, a baseball player in the Texas Rangers organization
- Caden Prieskorn, is an NFL football player
- Leonard Renfro, former American football defensive tackle who played two seasons for the Philadelphia Eagles in the NFL
- Allen Robinson is a current American football wide receiver for the Detroit Lions of the NFL
- Sam Rogers, a former American football linebacker in the NFL for the Buffalo Bills, the San Diego Chargers, and the Atlanta Falcons
- Dion Sims, an American football tight end for the Chicago Bears of the NFL

== Notable former faculty ==
- Dan Gheesling, Winner of Big Brother 10. Asst. Coach of a Football team, & Teacher of Health, Biology, & Physical Education at St. Mary's.
- Jeff Wall (lawyer), former civics teacher
- George Porritt, former athletic director, Head Football Coach, Head Basketball Coach, Head Lacrosse Coach. MHSAA Hall of Fame. Won ten total state championships across all three sports.
