= Saint Mary's College (Michigan) =

Catholic college in the United States

- U.S. Historic district – Contributing property
- Location within Michigan
- Location: Indian Trail, Orchard Lake, Michigan
- Coordinates: 42°35′38″N 83°21′28″W
- Built: 1858
- Architectural style: Gothic Revival, Tudor Revival, Queen Anne Revival
- Part of: Orchard Lake Schools Historic District (ID82002859)
- Designated CP: March 19, 1982

Saint Mary's College, also known as St. Mary's College of Madonna University, is a private college located in Orchard Lake Village, Michigan, United States. The college shares its campus with St. Mary's Preparatory and SS. Cyril and Methodius Seminary. It is located on the former site of the Michigan Military Academy. It was founded in 1885 by Joseph Dabrowski and transferred in 2003 to become St. Mary's College of and the Orchard Lake campus of Madonna University. Enrollment before the transfer was about 130 and specialized in Polish and Polish-American studies.

St. Mary's College has been a college of Madonna University since 2003. Baccalaureate degrees are offered in Sacred Theology, Philosophy, and Polish Studies. St. Mary's College is host to the Catholic Integrated Core Curriculum, a set of courses taken in lieu of general education courses that seeks to integrate faith and reason as outlined in Pope John Paul II's encyclical Fides et ratio, specifically through the study of philosophy, theology, and the works of Western civilization.

More widely, the campus is referred to as the Orchard Lake campus of Madonna University. Courses taught cover a wide array of subjects including psychology, biology, business, and computer science.

== Notable alumni ==
- Dale Joseph Melczek, Bishop Emeritus of the Diocese of Gary, Indiana.
- Kerry Bentivolio, former Member of the U.S. House of Representatives from Michigan's 11th congressional district.
