= Józef Dąbrowski =

Polish Catholic priest (1842–1903)

Father Jozef Dąbrowski
- Church: Catholic
- Other posts: Rector, SS. Cyril and Methodius Seminary (1887‍–‍1903)

Orders
- Ordination: August 1, 1869

Personal details
- Born: January 27, 1842 Zoltance, Poland (then held by Russia)
- Died: February 15, 1903 (aged 61) Detroit, Michigan, U.S.
- Education: University of Warsaw

Józef Dąbrowski (January 27, 1842 – February 15, 1903) was a Polish Catholic priest. He founded the SS. Cyril and Methodius Seminary in Michigan in the United States in 1887 and was the first rector there.

== Early life and ordination ==
Józef Dąbrowski was born in Zoltance, Poland at a time when it was held by Russia. He was born into a family of minor gentry and studied at the Lublin gimnazjum, then the University of Warsaw. He participated in the Polish January Uprising of 1863, and fled to Dresden in 1864, then to Lucerne and Berne where he continued his studies in mathematics. He then went to Rome and came under the direction of well-known Resurrectionist priest Peter Semenenko. He was ordained a priest in Rome on August 1, 1869.

== Pastoral work in America ==
In 1870, Dąbrowski was appointed pastor of Polonia, Wisconsin and moved there to do pastoral work among Polish Americans. In a letter from St. Francis Seminary to Peter Semenenko dated January 22, 1870, he expressed concern about demoralized conditions among the Poles in the United States.

Dąbrowski was gifted 20 acres (81,000 m²) of land by an Irishman for the erection of new parish buildings. In 1879 the rectory was destroyed by fire. The following year fire destroyed the new rectory and the church. Dąbrowski rebuilt the buildings.

== Schools ==
In 1874 he introduced the Felician Sisters from Kraków into the United States to open and run a school for Polish immigrants. Their community multiplied throughout the country, welcoming the immigrants, teaching thousands of Polish children, and caring for a multitude of Polish orphans and working girls. They were to staff more than 40% of all Polish parochial schools in the United States by the mid-twentieth century.

He published several school textbooks including Calendar (Kalendarz), Polish Readings (Czytanki Polskie), Arithmetic (Arytmetyka), Polish Geography (Geografia Polska), Gardening (Ogrodnictwo). In 1891 he started publishing the illustrated weekly newspaper Sunday (Niedziela), which ran until 1907.

Dąbrowski also worked with the indigenous peoples in Wisconsin. He learned their language and published an Indian-Polish dictionary for the Felician sisters. He worked to convert them to Christianity and there are records of native baptisms in parish registers.

Dąbrowski urged the Resurrectionists to come to Chicago or Milwaukee and establish schools of higher education where they might send out missionaries to the scattered Poles.

== SS. Cyril and Methodius Seminary ==
Dąbrowski founded the SS. Cyril and Methodius Seminary in Detroit, Michigan in 1887, becoming its first rector.

In 1882 failing health forced him to resign his post in Wisconsin and leave for Detroit, Michigan.

At that time Cardinal Ledóchowski was unable to meet the appeals of American bishops for Polish priests and ecclesiastical students. At his request, Leopold Moczygemba, a Franciscan who had worked in America and was then at St. Peter's, Rome, went, with papal approval, to America and collected funds ($8000) for a Polish seminary.

Moczygemba felt unable to complete the work and entrusted the task to Dąbrowski, who began building the seminary in 1884. On July 24, 1885, Bishop Stephen V. Ryan of the Roman Catholic Diocese of Buffalo blessed the cornerstone in the presence of Bishop Borgess of Detroit.

The seminary was opened in 1887, and until his death in 1903, Dąbrowski served as its rector. In 1902 it was enlarged, and in 1909 it moved to Orchard Lake, Michigan.

== Death ==
A few days before his death, Dąbrowski expelled 29 students from the seminary for open rebellion. On February 9, 1903, he suffered a paralytic stroke. He died at Detroit, February 15, 1903.
