= Orchard Lake (Michigan) =

Lake in Oakland County, Michigan, United States

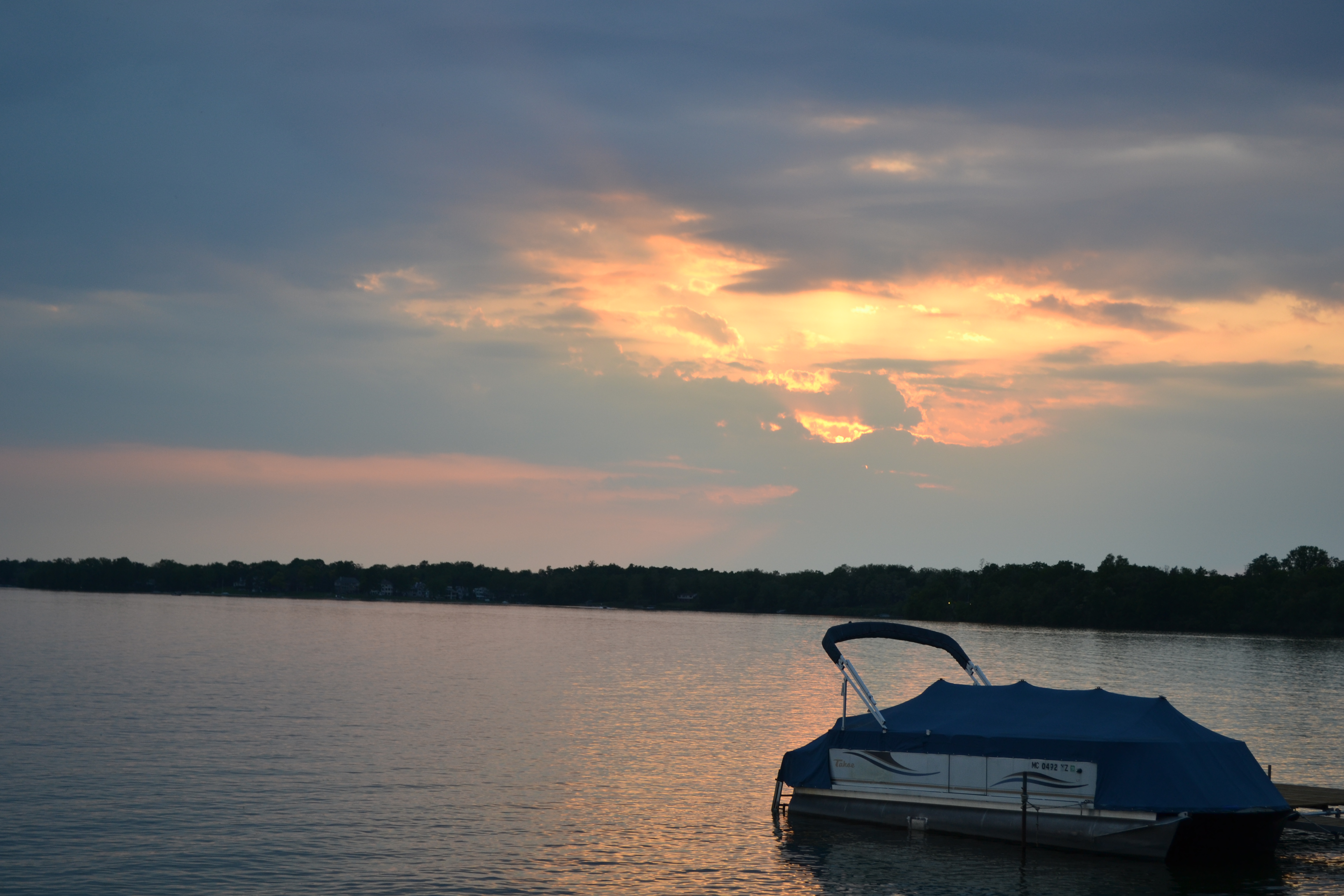
- Sunset on Orchard Lake, Michigan

- Location within Michigan
- Location: Orchard Lake Village, Michigan, United States
- Coordinates: 42°35′18″N 83°22′1″W
- Basin countries: United States
- Surface area: 795 acres (322 ha)
- Max. depth: 110 ft (34 m)
- Surface elevation: 928 feet (283 m)
- Islands: two; Apple Island, Cedar Island
- Settlements: Orchard Lake Village

Orchard Lake is a 795-acre lake located in Oakland County in the U.S. state of Michigan. The lake is within the city of Orchard Lake Village. It has a 110-foot (34 m) maximum depth and a surface elevation of 928-feet (283 m). Orchard Lake is the second-largest lake and third-deepest lake in Oakland County.

The lake has a 35-acre island in the middle of it, Apple Island. The island was frequently inhabited by local Native Americans before the coming of Western settlers, who later planted an apple orchard on the island, giving rise to the current name of the lake. Apple Island is now abandoned and has been designated a protected wildlife sanctuary. Once a year the island is circumnavigated by runners of Team CG across the lake’s frozen surface. Another island, Cedar Island, is near the lake's western shore.

The campus of the old Michigan Military Academy is on the northeast shore of the lake. The campus is now home to SS. Cyril and Methodius Seminary and St. Mary's Preparatory.

== See also ==
- List of lakes in Oakland County, Michigan
