= Joseph T. Copeland =

American judge and general

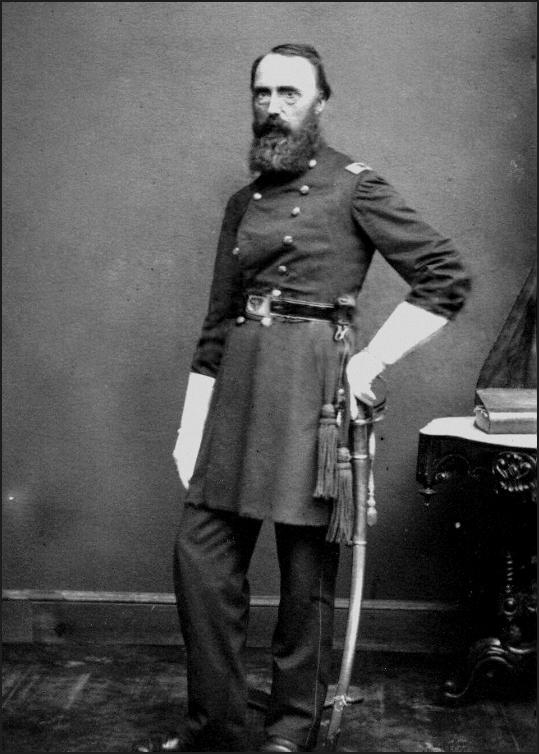
Joseph Tarr Copeland

Joseph Tarr Copeland (May 6, 1813 – May 6, 1893) was a justice of the Michigan Supreme Court from 1852 until 1857, as well as a general in the Union Army during the American Civil War.

== Biography ==
Copeland was born in New Castle, Maine. He studied at Harvard College and then read law under Daniel Webster. In 1844, he moved to St. Clair, Michigan and later built a sawmill in Bay City, Michigan.

At the start of the Civil War, Copeland served first as colonel and commander of the 1st Michigan Volunteer Cavalry, and then the 5th Michigan Volunteer Cavalry. Later promoted to brigadier general, he commanded the "wolverines" of the Michigan Brigade, but was replaced by George A. Custer shortly before the Battle of Gettysburg.

After this, Copeland moved to Orchard Lake, Michigan where he built a residence known as "The Castle". In 1870, he and some local businessmen turned it into a hotel, and in 1873, they sold it to J. Sumner Rogers, who used the site to found the Michigan Military Academy.

In 1878, Copeland moved to Florida, where he served for a time as a judge in Clay County.

He was initially buried in Orange Park, Florida, but was later re-interred at Oak Hill Cemetery in Pontiac, Michigan.

== The Maine years ==
Joseph Tarr Copeland was born to Royal and Alice (Davis) Copeland. Located in Lincoln County, Newcastle sits about forty miles north of Portland, Maine, yet is on a long finger of water extending to the Atlantic coast.

Joseph's father, Royal, the 2nd child of Captain Samuel and Emma (Parker) Copeland, was born August 11, 1790, in either Maine or New Hampshire. Samuel had fought in the Revolutionary War. Joseph's mother, Alice, was born in Wiscasset, Maine on February 9, 1791. She had been orphaned at an early age and was raised by her mother's sister, Mrs. Tarr. In a letter to his children, Joseph's brother writes about his parents' meeting,

When my father was 21 years old he started out to seek a fortune for himself. He went down to Wiscasset. The first job he got was up on one of the rivers to cut marsh hay and when he finished that job he hired out to a farmer near the river by the name of Joseph Tarr. Mrs. Tarr had a niece living with her by the name of Alice Davis, a girl 16 years old and her parents were dead. She was a strong husky girl, could climb a tree and ride horseback and my father fell in love with the girl and married her...

Royal, a farmer, and Alice were married in Newcastle, about 1812, 8 years before Maine became a state.

Joseph was the eldest of 11 children – 7 boys and 4 girls:

Name	Birthdate
Joseph Tarr Copeland	May 6, 1813
Emeline Copeland	August 27, 1816
Alice Copeland	October 11, 1817
Samuel Copeland	November 25, 1819
Royal Franklin Copeland	December 4, 1821
Edwin Ruthven Copeland	April 5, 1824
Lucinda Safford Copeland	May 9, 1825
Mary Elizabeth Copeland	January 4, 1828
Daniel Lambart Copeland	April 11, 1833
Alpheus Crosby Copeland	May 1, 1834
Roscoe Pulaski Copeland	March 6, 1838

In about 1818, the family moved to Dexter, Maine, where Joseph's eight youngest siblings were born. Unfortunately, both Lucinda Safford and Mary Elizabeth died before their tenth birthdays.

The Copeland's family was not well off, but when he died, Joseph's grandfather left him five hundred dollars to get an education. Joseph attended and graduated from Harvard College (now University). Established in 1817, Harvard is the oldest continuously operating law school in the United States. Upon graduation, Copeland began studying law with Daniel Webster at his Boston law firm. At the time, Webster was one of the most celebrated lawyers in the country. He had been elected a U.S. Senator from Massachusetts in 1827 and was re-elected in 1833. Webster was also one of several Whig candidates for president in 1836. While with Webster, it is rumored that Copeland was sent to Michigan on a "secret mission" by President Andrew Jackson.

Eventually, Joseph returned to Maine. He enlisted as Ensign of the 1st Co. of Riflemen, 3rd Regiment, 1st Brigade of Militia of Maine, on December 20, 1834. He became captain of the same on April 16, 1838; major in July 1838; and colonel on June 28, 1839. Joseph may well have played a role in the bloodless Aroostook War, an 1839 boundary dispute between New Brunswick and Maine. Coincidentally, Daniel Webster negotiated a compromise that averted actual fighting. Always one to be as busy as possible, Copeland was appointed a justice of the peace in Maine on February 12, 1835, and again on February 6, 1838. In 1837, Amos Kendall, postmaster general, appointed Copeland as the postmaster for North New Portland, Maine.

Joseph married Mary Jane Wilson, daughter of Robert & Margaret Wilson, on July 19, 1835. They had three children:

Name	Birthdate	In
Frederick Augustus	June 6, 1836	Dexter, Penobscot, Maine
Florence Hortense	May 9, 1840	New Portland, Maine
Agnes "Aggie" Theresa	June 10, 1842	New Portland, Maine

== The Judicial years ==
At some point after the birth of Agnes in 1842, Joseph Tarr Copeland and his family moved to Michigan. They settled in St. Clair, Michigan, in 1844; there, Joseph began a law practice. They were not the first in the family to relocate; Joseph's uncle Chauncey Copeland made the journey in 1834. Eventually, Joseph's parents and at least two of his brothers' families ended up living near Dexter, Michigan.

They (Joseph's aunts and uncles) all lived near the old farm until 1834 when Uncle Chauncy went to Mich with his own team in a covered wagon and settled on a farm at Stoney Creek... Broth. Edwin went to Stoney Creek in 1845. In the spring of 1847 Uncle Chauncy came to Maine to get father to come to Mich. So father and mother thought they had better go. Joseph went before Edwin and settled in St. Clare (sic) and was elected probate judge. The whole family had the western fever.

In 1846, a system of county courts was created by the Michigan legislature with jurisdiction of claims in excess of those within a justice's jurisdiction, and not above $500. They also had appellate jurisdiction from justices' courts. The county courts were presided over by two judges elected for a term of four years, respectively called the county judge and second judge, both of whom were paid by fees. On November 3, 1846, Joseph T. Copeland was elected St. Clair county judge, and Z. W. Bunce, second judge.

Seemingly a one-man political machine, Copeland was made deputy collector and inspector of revenue for St. Clair County in 1848. In 1849, he became St. Clair's master of chancery and was also elected to the Michigan State Senate, serving one term (1850–51) in the state legislature. He further became the first president of the village of St. Clair in 1850 and its treasurer in 1851.

Under the constitution of 1850, the county courts were abolished and Michigan was divided into circuits composed of one or more counties, with a judge in each to be elected for a term of six years with an annual salary of $1,500. There were six circuits in the state, and the six circuit judges formed the Michigan Supreme Court. St. Clair County was included in the Sixth Judicial District, composed of Oakland, Macomb, St. Clair and Sanilac counties. Naturally, Copeland was elected Circuit Judge and concurrently became the 14th Michigan Supreme Court Justice.

In 1851, after his election as Circuit Judge, Joseph and his family moved to Pontiac, which was within the same judicial district. Copeland was becoming increasingly interested in a lumber enterprise and arranged with Judge Sanford M. Green so that the latter held most of the terms of court in St. Clair County, in addition to holding court in his own district. Beginning in 1854, Copeland began amassing timberland in Midland, Saginaw, Bay, Ogemaw, and Gladwin counties. During the next six years he purchased over 6,370 acres from the U.S. Government and may have purchased additional land from private owners. He reportedly built the first sawmill in Bay City, Michigan. The 1870 Census notes that two of Joseph's brothers, Royal Franklin and Roscoe Pulaski, are "lumber dealers" near Dexter, each with considerable wealth. Perhaps influenced by his famous uncle, Roscoe's son Royal eventually became Mayor of nearby Ann Arbor and ultimately a U.S. Senator from New York.

David Burton (Joseph's brother-in-law, husband of Emeline) and family came to Mich in 1852 and bought a farm on the hill up the lane 80 rods west of our (Joseph's brother Roscoe) farm in Scio Township, Michigan... He lived there three or four years and then moved to Midland County, Michigan about forty miles from Saganaw (sic). The winter before he and Alphous had been up there to work in a lumber camp that was owned by Joseph and son. He liked the country and bought 160 acres of new land. The next winter after they moved mother and I made them a visit. At that time brother Frank and Samuel were living in Saginaw, Michigan. Joseph and Samuel had a saw mill and got their pine timber up the river near where Burton located and when we made that first visit Frank and wife went with us. From Saganaw one went up the river on the ice as that was the main road in the winter to get back and forth from their lumber camp.

Judge Copeland delivered but few opinions while a member of the Supreme Court, and these are marked by brevity, a good vein of reasoning, and few references to authority. During this time, his health was poor, and Copeland ultimately resigned his position as Circuit and Supreme Court Judge in 1857, before the expiration of his term. Judge Green was elected to replace him.

Upon his retirement from the bench, Copeland moved to West Bloomfield Township, Michigan, and in 1858 built the elaborate, Gothic Revival house that has always been referred to as "the castle" on the north shore of Orchard Lake. On October 6, 1858, Joseph's daughter Florence married English-born Dr. John P. Wilson, who practiced surgery in Pontiac. Together they had four children. The 1860 Federal Census shows Copeland to be the fourth-richest head of household in West Bloomfield Township, with real estate holdings valued at $15,000. In 1860, ever active, he was also a member of the board of Visitors to the Military Academy at West Point (United States Military Academy). Joseph's only son, Frederick, married Harriet Drake Talbot, in Pontiac, Michigan on May 6, 1860. The following year, on January 13, 1861, Joseph's father, Royal, died in Dexter, Michigan.

I well remember the first sail boats on Orchard Lake," Willis Ward recalled. "They belonged to General Copeland. He had two of them, the smaller one of which had been dismantled and was drawn up on the beach. It was his first sail boat. He was sailing the larger boat which was a sloop. He didn't do very much sailing, however, and I imagine these boats were rather clumsy and not very fast. They were black, being covered with pitch, and I remember my brother getting well tarred up playing around the smaller boat on the beach, greatly to my mother's disgust.

— Willis C. Ward

Joseph Tarr Copeland, already a distinguished former legislator and Michigan Supreme Court Justice, sold his 136-acre estate in section 32 of Pontiac Township, Michigan in 1858. He and his wife, Mary Jane, relocated several miles to the southwest on the north shore of Orchard Lake, in West Bloomfield Township, Michigan. There he built his "castle", which still stands today as the nucleus of St. Mary's College and Preparatory School.

In the spring of 1860, Joseph and his brother Samuel formed a company to finance a mining expedition to the Colorado Territory. A party of seventeen, including five of Joseph's brothers, took a train to Saint Joseph, Missouri, the westernmost rail terminal at the time, and then set off in eleven covered wagons packed with a year's provisions. Three of the group, including Samuel, stayed in the mountains west of Denver long enough to take part in the Colorado Territory's first election on August 19, 1861. Roscoe, Joseph's youngest brother, details the entire adventure – which unfortunately failed to make them all rich – in a fascinating letter to his children.

== The Civil War years ==
A seasoned military man, having been promoted to colonel in the Maine Militia in the 1830s, Copeland offered his service at the brink of the Civil War. He joined the 1st Michigan Volunteer Cavalry Regiment at its organization, as lieutenant colonel, at age 48. He was commissioned and mustered on August 22, 1861. When the 5th Michigan Volunteer Cavalry Regiment was organized August 14, 1862, Joseph was commissioned its colonel. Copeland was one of the first officers to appreciate the significance of the Spencer repeating rifle and supplied the 5th and 6th Michigan Cavalry regiments with the rifles.

On November 29, 1862, he was given a star and assigned to command the Michigan Cavalry Brigade (Michigan Brigade), which consisted of several cavalry regiments. Copeland and the Michigan Cavalry Brigade distinguished themselves at the First Battle of Kernstown. "When the Confederates broke, he [Copeland] unleashed his men...in pursuit. Stone walls and fences did not dissipate the enthusiasm of the horsemen when Copeland gave the order to charge. Between two and three hundred retreating Rebels fell prisoner to them."

Joseph's son, Frederick, followed his father into service during the Civil War, enlisting as 1st lieutenant in Company G of the 1st Michigan Volunteer Cavalry Regiment on September 25, 1862. He was subsequently promoted to the rank of captain and served on his father's staff until the close of the war. After the war, Frederick moved first to Tennessee and then, in 1868, to Denver, Colorado, where he eventually became an electric car conductor. He and his wife had four children, only one of whom survived past their first birthday.

On June 27, 1863, Brigadier General Copeland was commanding the Fifth and Sixth Cavalry on reconnaissance through Pennsylvania to find General Robert E. Lee's forces. During the early hours of June 29, 1863, Copeland and his staff were riding towards Emmitsburg, Maryland, when an approaching courier informed the fifty-year-old that he had been removed from command of the Michigan Cavalry Brigade.

So on the eve of the Battle of Gettysburg, Copeland was replaced by General George Armstrong Custer. Copeland protested his removal to no avail. According to one historian, the change in command "seems to have been no reflection on Copeland's integrity or patriotism." Instead, "he was overage for a cavalry commander and with the change of army commanders (McClellan had been removed)... the entire Cavalry Corps was overhauled."

For the rest of the war, Copeland commanded the depot for drafted men at Annapolis, Maryland, and later Pittsburgh, Pennsylvania. His last command was the military prison at Alton, Illinois. Copeland resigned his commission on November 8, 1865, and returned to his home in West Bloomfield.

== The Hotel years ==
The elite of Pontiac frequently rode out in their fine carriages to call on the Copelands. When I was about 10 years of age we were greatly surprised to hear that some Pontiac business men had entered into a partnership with General Copeland to build a summer resort hotel on his premises, using the castle as a nucleus for it. Soon after, hammers and saws were resounding and two long wooden wings were built extending sideways from either side of the castle, while a lobby was finished off in the latter. A great opening of the hotel took place the next year in June and it became crowded with the elite of Detroit. A four horse frontier stage coach with cowboy driver and covered with leather trappings in true western style plied with cracking of whips and much apparent abandon at top speed between the railroad depot at Pontiac and the hotel, meeting all passenger trains.

Around 1870, Copeland and a group of Pontiac investors went into partnership to turn "the castle" into a resort hotel. David Ward, a wealthy neighbor of Copeland, describes his learning of the proposed hotel,

Soon after, another scheme was planned to ruin my place by forming a stock company to build a large summer hotel, and before I had any notice of it ... a bargain was made with Judge Copeland for a two acre piece of land across the road and in front of my residence, for this company's hotel site. ... This hotel scheme purchase was made in November, and during the following winter some fifty cords of building stone were drawn by sleigh and piled upon the purchased property ready to commence building in the spring.

Copeland enlarged his house, creating the Orchard Lake Hotel. From this site, tourists boarded the Pride of the Lake and traveled to Apple Island. Seemingly unable to give up a life of public service, Copeland was appointed Postmaster of Orchard Lake on March 17, 1873.

They now think the hotel will be opened on 20 June. We've decided on that day still things may not be brought ____ by that time. Will of course let you know positively as to the time when I want to see you here. ... By the by the program for the opening day is dinner at two, drives & excursions on the lake. At six I think a light tea. At nine strawberries ice cream etc. Then dancing until twelve then oph to bed.

— Aggie Copeland

At first, the hotel prospered, but the panic of 1873 or possibly "poor management" ruined the venture. Copeland eventually sold the property in 1877 to Colonel Joseph Summer Rodgers, who established the Michigan Military Academy on the site. Closely modeled after the military academy at West Point, the school attained national prominence, attracting students from throughout the region and the nation.

On August 21, 1877, Copeland's mother, Alice, died in Dexter, Michigan. She is buried among many family members in Dexter's Forest Lawn Cemetery.

== The Florida years ==
In 1878, Copeland moved to Orange Park, near Jacksonville, in Clay County, Florida. Far from slowing down, he was appointed a justice of the peace in 1879. On August 25, 1879, he was appointed postmaster of Orange Park. In 1881, Copeland began serving as judge of Clay County. The appointment was renewed in 1885 and again in 1887.

After 53 years of marriage, Joseph's wife, Mary Jane, died in Orange Park on January 10, 1888. Later that year, Joseph's youngest daughter, Agnes, married Heber Taylor on June 20, 1888.

After practicing his profession for upwards of 58 years, Joseph Tarr Copeland died on May 6, 1893, on his eightieth birthday. A 1926 letter from Roscoe tells his children, "your Uncle Joseph and Aunt Mary died in Florida & their remains were brought back to Pontiac for burial." They are buried side by side in Pontiac's Oak Hill Cemetery.

== Sources ==
Much of this material was compiled for the Greater West Bloomfield Historical Society Joseph Tarr Copeland by Neil Hepburn.
