= David Bowens =

American football player (born 1977)

No. 52, 96
- Position: Linebacker

Personal information
- Born: July 3, 1977 (age 49); Denver, Colorado, U.S.
- Listed height: 6 ft 3 in (1.91 m)
- Listed weight: 265 lb (120 kg)

Career information
- High school: St. Mary's Preparatory (Orchard Lake Village, Michigan)
- College: Michigan, Western Illinois
- NFL draft: 1999: 5th round, 158th overall pick

Career history
- Denver Broncos (1999); Green Bay Packers (2000); Buffalo Bills (2001)*; Washington Redskins (2001); Miami Dolphins (2001–2006); New York Jets (2007–2008); Cleveland Browns (2009–2010)
- * Offseason or practice squad member only

Awards and highlights
- Division I-AA All-American (1998); Second-team All-Big Ten (1996)

Career NFL statistics
- Total tackles: 351
- Sacks: 38.5
- Forced fumbles: 7
- Fumble recoveries: 7
- Interceptions: 4
- Defensive touchdowns: 3
- Stats at Pro Football Reference

David Walter Bowens (born July 3, 1977) is an American former professional football player who was a linebacker for 12 seasons in the National Football League (NFL). He was selected by the Denver Broncos in the fifth round of the 1999 NFL draft. He played college football for the Michigan Wolverines. He now is Archbishop Carroll High School’s Defensive Coordinator in Riverside Ohio.

Bowens was also a member of the Green Bay Packers, Buffalo Bills, Washington Redskins, Miami Dolphins, New York Jets, and Cleveland Browns.

== Early life ==
Bowens attended St. Mary's Preparatory in Orchard Lake, Michigan and was a letterman in football, basketball, and track and field. In basketball, he won All-State honors.

== College career ==
Bowens started his college career at the University of Michigan for two seasons before he transferred to Western Illinois. He majored in accounting.

== Professional career ==
=== Denver Broncos ===
Bowens was originally drafted in the fifth round (158th overall) of the 1999 NFL draft out of Western Illinois University by the Denver Broncos.

=== Green Bay Packers ===
Bowens played for the Green Bay Packers in 2000, recording 3.5 sacks.

=== Miami Dolphins ===
Bowens played with the Miami Dolphins from 2001 to 2006.

=== New York Jets ===
On March 27, he agreed to terms on a three-year contract with the Jets worth more than $6 million. He was released by the Jets on February 19, 2009.

=== Cleveland Browns ===
Bowens was signed to a four-year, $7.2 million contract by the Cleveland Browns on March 10, 2009. The move reunited him with head coach Eric Mangini, for whom he played while with the Jets. On October 24, 2010, he caught and returned two interceptions for touchdowns against the New Orleans Saints, one for 64 yards and another for 30 yards. These were vital plays and led to the Browns upset win over the Saints, 30–17.

On February 9, 2011, the Browns released Bowens.
