= Dion Sims =

American football player (born 1991)

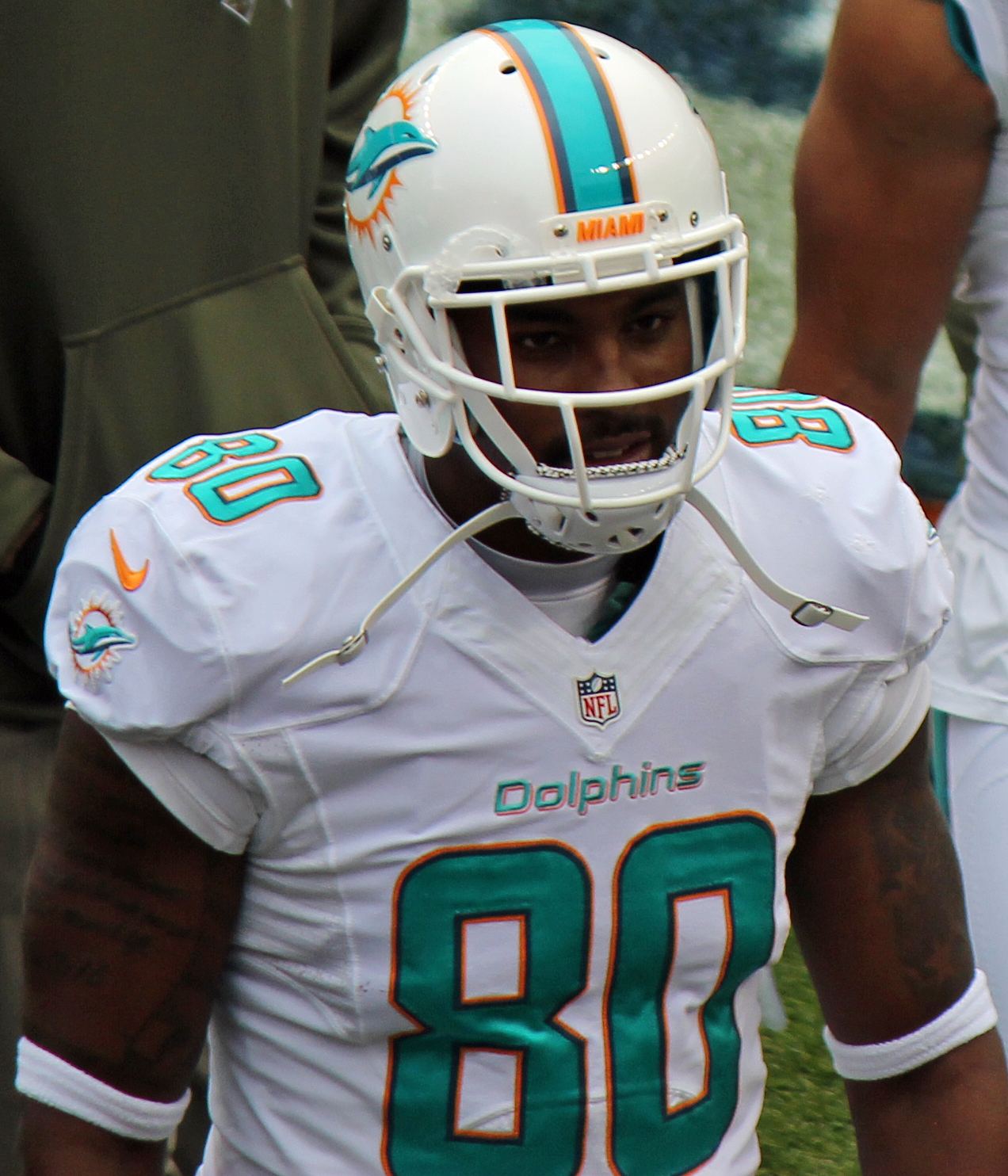
- Sims with the Miami Dolphins in 2014

No. 80, 88
- Position: Tight end

Personal information
- Born: February 18, 1991 (age 35); Detroit, Michigan, U.S.
- Listed height: 6 ft 5 in (1.96 m)
- Listed weight: 271 lb (123 kg)

Career information
- High school: St. Mary's Preparatory (Orchard Lake Village, Michigan)
- College: Michigan State (2009-2012)
- NFL draft: 2013: 4th round, 106th overall pick

Career history
- Miami Dolphins (2013–2016); Chicago Bears (2017–2018)

Awards and highlights
- Second-team All-Big Ten (2012)

Career NFL statistics
- Receptions: 91
- Receiving yards: 888
- Receiving touchdowns: 9
- Stats at Pro Football Reference

Dion Sims (born February 18, 1991) is an American former professional football player who was a tight end in the National Football League (NFL). He played college football for the Michigan State Spartans and was selected by the Miami Dolphins in the fourth round of the 2013 NFL draft.

== Early life ==
Sims was born in Detroit, Michigan. He attended St. Mary's Preparatory in Orchard Lake Village, Michigan, where he played high school football for the St. Mary's Eaglets. He suffered a knee injury in the 2008 season opener and missed the next seven games. He played in only two games as a senior and had four catches for 86 yards (21.5 avg.) and one touchdown. As a junior, he earned first-team all-state, first-team all-area and first-team All-Oakland County honors in 2007. He was named first-team All-North as a linebacker by The Detroit News, and was also selected second-team all-metro as a linebacker. He led the Eaglets in receptions as a junior with 29 for 604 yards (20.8 avg.) and three touchdowns.

Considered a four-star recruit by Rivals.com, he was rated the No. 5 tight end in the nation. He accepted a scholarship offer from Michigan State University over offers from Michigan, Iowa and Ohio State. Sims was dual-recruited for both football and basketball at Michigan State. He finished fourth in voting for Mr. Basketball of Michigan in 2008–09.

== College career ==
Sims attended Michigan State University, and played for the Michigan State Spartans football team from 2009 to 2012. As a junior in 2012, he was a second-team All-Big Ten Conference selection at tight end. He finished his college career with 59 receptions for 707 yards and eight touchdowns. He also made several appearances for the Michigan State Spartans men's basketball team his freshman year before deciding to focus solely on football.

Sims entered the 2013 NFL Draft after his junior season.

== Professional career ==
=== Pre-draft ===
Coming out of college, Sims was projected by many analysts to be a fourth- or fifth-round selection. He was ranked the seventh-best tight end out of the 97 available by NFLDraftScout.com. He was invited to the NFL Combine and completed all the positional drills and the entire workout. Sims also participated at Michigan State's Pro Day, along with Le'Veon Bell, William Gholston, Johnny Adams, and five other teammates. Satisfied with his combine numbers, Sims only participated in positional drills and worked out in front of scouts and representatives from 23 teams, including Pittsburgh Steelers head coach Mike Tomlin. Analysts gave him positive reviews for his quick and nimble feet while blocking, large frame, soft hands, and breakaway tackle ability. The only negative reviews were about his blocking technique and how he can be slow to get off the line of scrimmage.

Pre-draft measurables
Height	Weight	Arm length	Hand span	40-yard dash	10-yard split	20-yard split	20-yard shuttle	Three-cone drill	Vertical jump	Broad jump	Bench press
6 ft 5 in (1.96 m)	262 lb (119 kg)	33 3/8 in (0.85 m)	10 1/2 in (0.27 m)	4.75 s	1.62 s	2.75 s	4.52 s	7.36 s	35 in (0.89 m)	9 ft 4 in (2.84 m)	22 reps
All values from NFL Combine

=== Miami Dolphins ===
==== 2013 ====
In the 2013 NFL draft, the Miami Dolphins selected Sims in the fourth round, with the 106th overall pick.

On May 17, 2013, the Dolphins signed Sims to a four-year, $2.62 million rookie contract that included a signing bonus of $467,552.

He started his rookie year as the backup tight end on the Miami Dolphins' depth chart, behind veteran Charles Clay. Although he started the season opener against the Cleveland Browns, he did not make a catch until Week 3. In that game, he scored his first career touchdown on a 1-yard pass from Ryan Tannehill against the Atlanta Falcons. He finished his rookie year with six receptions, 32 receiving yards, and a touchdown in 15 games and five starts.

==== 2014 ====
The following season, he returned as the backup tight end behind Charles Clay. In the season opener, he earned his first start of the season and caught one pass for 9 yards in a 33–20 victory over the New England Patriots. On September 28, 2014, Sims caught one pass for an 18-yard touchdown during a victory over the Oakland Raiders. In Week 14, he caught a season-high four passes for a season-high 58 receiving yards in a 13–28 loss to the Baltimore Ravens. On December 21, 2014, Sims caught three passes for 35 yards and a touchdown in a win over the Minnesota Vikings. He finished his second season with 24 receptions, 284 receiving yards and two touchdowns and played in 14 games with two starts.

==== 2015 ====
Sims remained the backup tight end for the third consecutive season with the Dolphins. Newly acquired veteran free-agent Jordan Cameron was named the starter going into the season. In the season opener against the Washington Redskins, Sims suffered a severe concussion when hitting his head when diving for a touchdown catch in the end zone. After colliding with the turf, he remained motionless for a few seconds before regaining consciousness and sitting up, with the aid of Dolphin's trainers. He missed the next three game while recovering from the concussion. On October 18, 2015, he returned for the first time since the season-opener and made a season-high four receptions for 33 yards and a touchdown in a victory over the Tennessee Titans. He received his first start of the season in Week 10 and made one catch for 8-yards in a loss to the Buffalo Bills. On January 3, 2016, Sims made three catches for a season-high forty yards in a 20–10 victory over the New England Patriots. He finished the 2015 season with 18 receptions for 127 yards and one touchdown.

==== 2016 ====
In Week 15 against the New York Jets, Sims had two receiving touchdowns. He finished the 2016 season with 26 receptions for 256 yards and four touchdowns.

=== Chicago Bears ===
On March 10, 2017, Sims signed a three-year contract with the Chicago Bears. On September 10, in his Bears debut, Sims had two receptions for 31 yards in the 23–17 home loss to the Atlanta Falcons at Soldier Field. He started 14 games in his first season in Chicago, recording 15 receptions for 180 yards and one touchdown.

On November 17, 2018, Sims was placed on injured reserve with a concussion. He recorded just two catches for nine yards, both of which came in the season opener against the Green Bay Packers.

On February 21, 2019, Sims was released by the Bears.

Sims announced his retirement from professional football on May 1, 2020.
