= Jimmy Hare =

English photojournalist

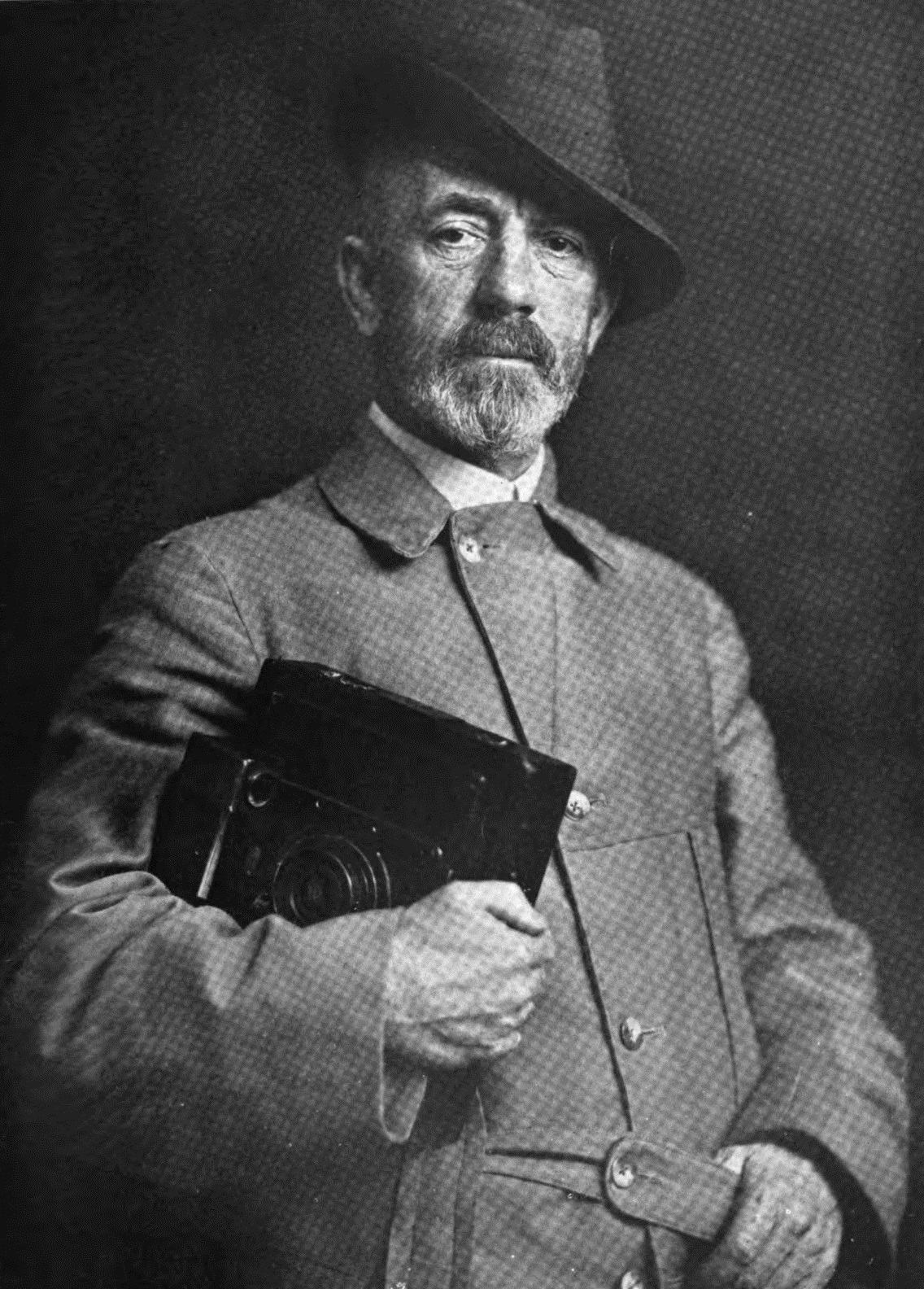
- Hare in 1913
- Born: James H. Hare; 3 October 1856; London, England
- Died: 24 June 1946 (aged 89); Teaneck, New Jersey
- Occupation: Photojournalist

James H. Hare (3 October 1856 – 24 June 1946) was an English photojournalist active between 1898 and 1931. He was the leading photographer during five major wars, and was the driving force behind Collier's becoming a large circulation magazine. Among other conflicts he covered, he photographed the Mexican Revolution (1910-20).

== Early life ==
Hare was born in London to George Hare, who, after a successful cabinet making business, became a successful camera manufacturer. Hare attended St. John's College in London. He voluntarily left after one year and became an apprentice in his fathers camera shop.

In 1879, Hare and his father had a disagreement when he told his father that they should begin making smaller hand-held cameras, which were becoming technologically feasible. Hare left his father's business to work for another London firm. On 2 August that year Hare married Ellen Crapper with whom he had five children.

== Career ==
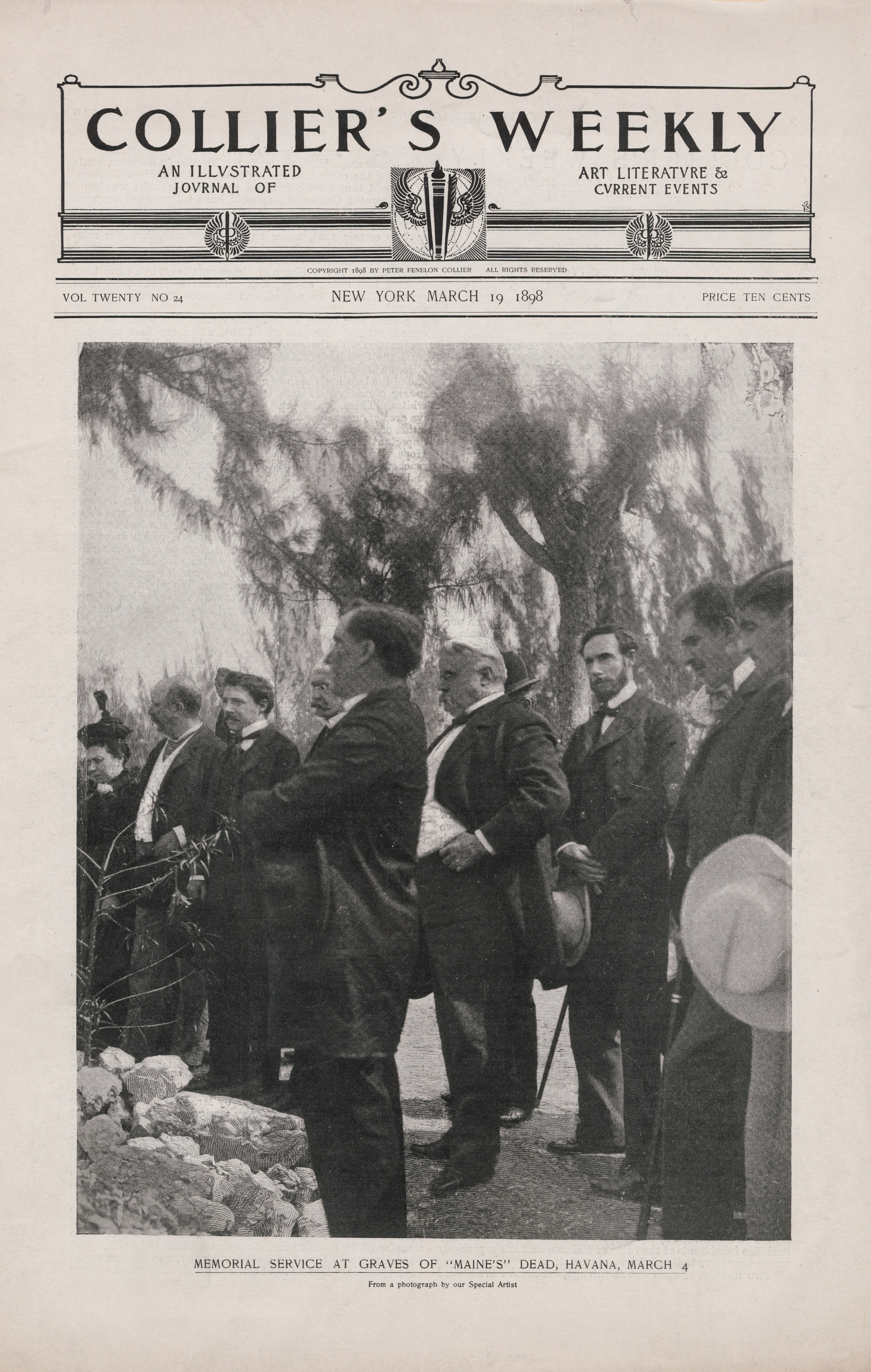
Cover of Collier's Weekly for 19 March 1898: "Memorial Service at Grave of Maine's Dead, Havana, March 4"

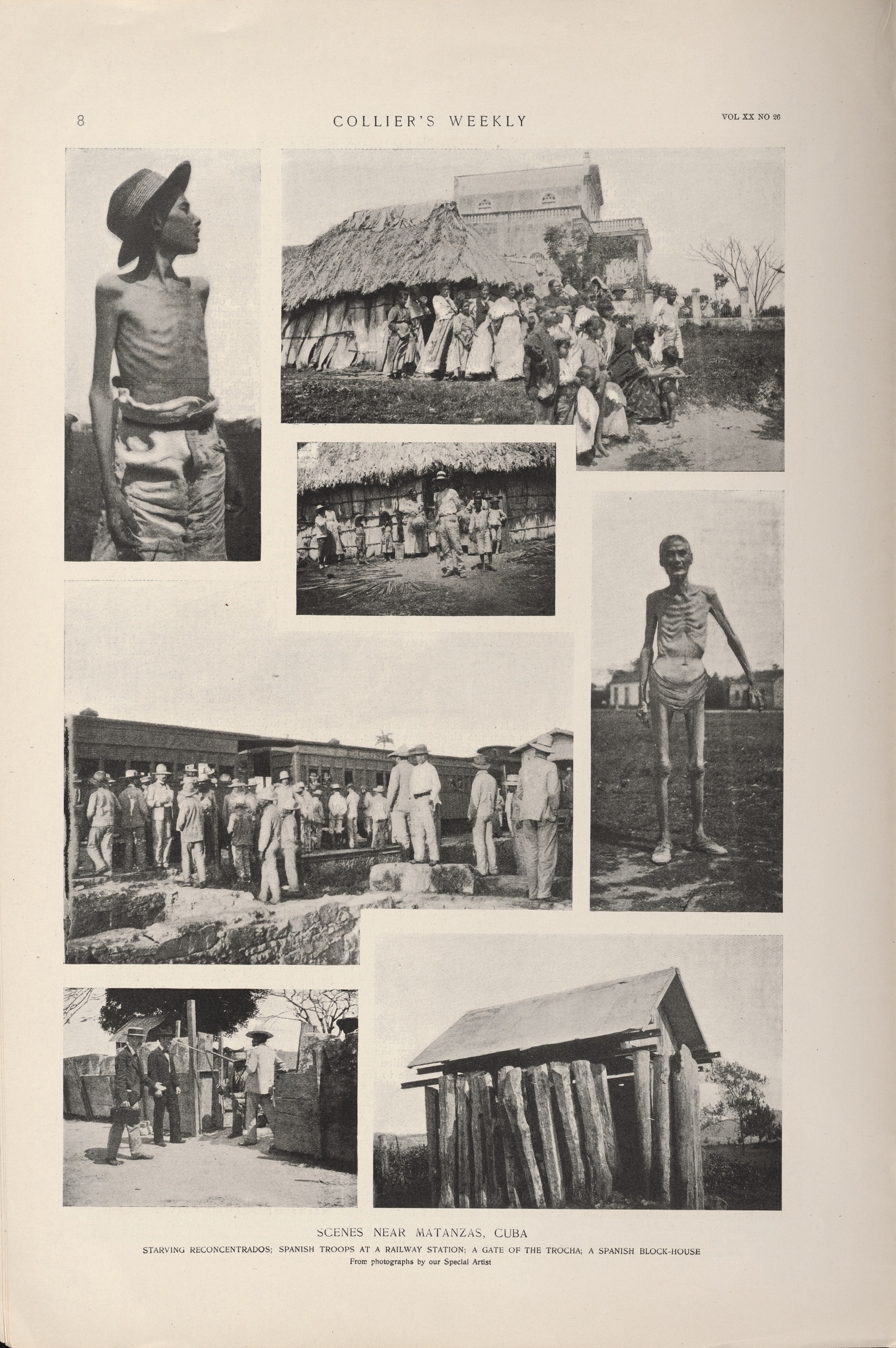
Scenes near Matanzas, Cuba, in Collier's Weekly (2 April 1898)

During the early 1880s Hare began to lose interest in camera manufacturing. He took up free-lance photography as a hobby and sold his work to various London journals.

In 1889, Hare became a technical adviser for E.& H.T. Anthony & Co., moving from London to Brooklyn, New York, where he lived for the rest of his life. He worked for a while as a free-lance photographer and in 1895, he became a full-time photographer for Illustrated American magazine.

On 15 February 1898, one month after a fire destroyed the Illustrated American headquarters, Hare presented himself at the office of Collier's Weekly proposing to photograph the wreckage of the battleship Maine, and life in Spanish Cuba. This was his first major job. He then captured images of the Spanish–American War (1898), which Collier's used to build support up for the controversial conflict. His intimate wartime photography was often cited as the reason Collier's circulation increased momentously. Other reporters with whom he worked at this time included Sylvester Scovel, Stephen Crane, and Richard Harding Davis.

After the Spanish–American War, Hare photographed four more wars: the Russo-Japanese War in 1904 and 1905, the Mexican Revolution in 1911 and 1914, the First Balkan War in 1912 and 1913, and World War I. He became known as the man who made the Russo-Japanese conflict famous, and was adored by his peers and contemporaries. In 1914, he learned that Collier's, his longtime employer, would not be sending him to Europe to cover World War I, so he contacted Leslie's Weekly to offer his services. He was hired by them and sent to England. Writers and photographers were often limited in their access to war fronts and had their writings and photos censored, but Hare was nevertheless a tirelessly tenacious photographer. During World War I he documented American, British, Canadian, and Italian soldiers, St Dunstan's home for blind soldiers, the Greek harbour town of Thessaloniki, the military hospital at the Hall of Mechanics at the Grand Palais in Paris, people fleeing Antwerp, funerals of the dead from the RMS Lusitania, and the American Ambulance Hospital at Neuilly-sur-Seine, among other subjects.

Other than photographing war, he took many notable photographs of aircraft evolution and early aviators, including the first photo by a journalist of an aircraft in flight in the US—the Wright Flyer III at the Kill Devil Hills in North Carolina in May 1908. (The Wright brothers had flown in 1903 but were wary of flying in front of spectators and reporters and Alberto Santos-Dumont had flown in public in 1906 in France.) He also documented American presidents, Boy Scouts, Haiti and other Latin American locations, and religious and archaeological sites in the Middle East.

Hare was profiled by The American Magazine in 1913 among its "interesting people", citing "the ability to catch the dramatic elements in the event he is picturing."

After 1922 Hare did little photography but lectured regularly. In 1929, Hare retired. In 1939, he was made the honorary president of the Overseas Press Club. On 24 June 1946, he died while staying with one of his daughters in Teaneck, New Jersey.

Hare's collection of negatives, prints, and lantern slides are at the Harry Ransom Center, at the University of Texas at Austin.

== Sources ==
- Time Line from Temple University
- Gould, Lewis L. and Richard Greffe. Photojournalist: The Career of Jimmy Hare. Austin: University of Texas Press, 1977.
- Palmer, Frederick. "About 'Jimmy' Hare: A Personal Sketch of Collier's War Photographer with the Japanese Army." Collier's. 25 February 1905, page 18.
- "This Brooklyn Man Takes Pictures in the Air," Brooklyn Daily Eagle. 12 May 1912: 2. Print.
