= Michigan Military Academy =

- Orchard Lake Schools Historic District
- U.S. National Register of Historic Places
- U.S. Historic district
- Michigan State Historic Site
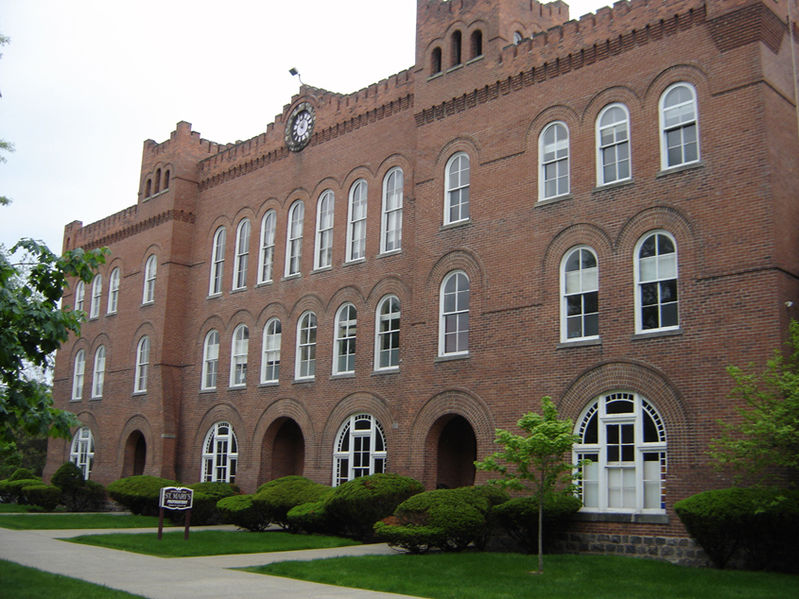
- The Academic Building of the Michigan Military Academy was built in 1890. It now holds many of the classrooms for St. Mary's Preparatory.

- Location within Michigan Location within the United States
- Interactive map
- Location: Indian Trail, Orchard Lake, Michigan
- Coordinates: 42°35′38″N 83°21′28″W
- Area: 15 acres (6.1 ha)
- Built: 1858
- Architectural style: Gothic, Tudor Revival, Queen Anne
- NRHP reference No.: 82002859
- Added to NRHP: March 19, 1982

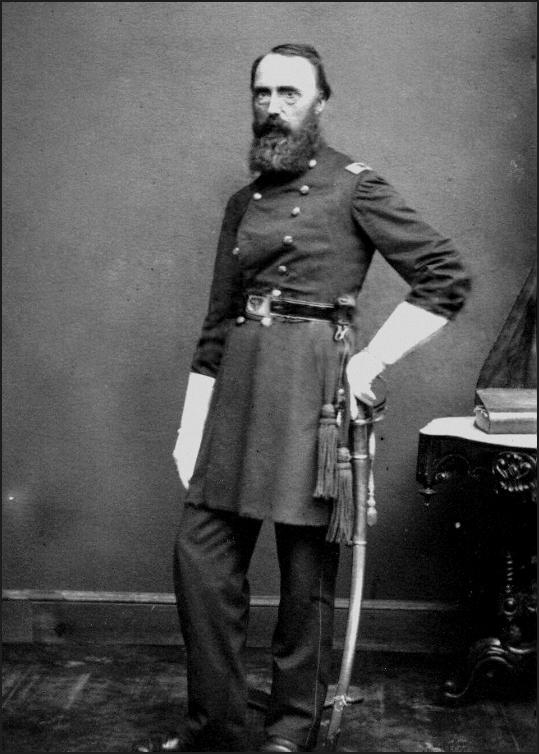
Joseph Tarr Copeland

The Michigan Military Academy, also known as M.M.A., was an all-boys military prep school in Orchard Lake Village, Oakland County, Michigan. It was founded in 1877 by J. Sumner Rogers and closed in 1908 due to bankruptcy. Some journalists have referred to the school as the Second West Point. The property was listed on the National Register of Historic Places in 1982 as the Orchard Lake Schools Historic District.

== Early history and establishment ==
In 1858, Joseph Tarr Copeland, a U.S. Army general who would later serve in the American Civil War, purchased several acres of land and began to build his retirement home on the shores of Orchard Lake. Most of the 90 acres (364,000 m^{2}) he owned were used for agricultural purposes, and he was slowly selling tracts of land for development. The area was popular with tourists, so in 1871 Copeland converted his residence, a large, castle-like home on the shores of Orchard Lake, into the Orchard Lake Hotel. Business was good for a few years but development in the area forced many vacationers to seek seclusion farther north and the Panic of 1873 forced Copeland to find profit elsewhere. In 1877 Copeland sought to sell his home and the land around it. J. Sumner Rogers, who was a professor of Military Science and Tactics at Detroit High School, had wanted to establish a creditable military prep school in the Detroit area for some time. Seeing the opportunity at hand, Rogers bought the land with the help of some wealthy Detroiters, and later that year he established the Michigan Military Academy. He modeled the academy after West Point and its success was immediate.

== Peak years ==
Over the course of its 30-year history, Michigan Military Academy had 2,558 enrollments and 458 graduates. The graduating class of 1893 played a prominent role in the World Columbian Exposition in Chicago, and many of the classes won National Drill Competitions.

On June 19, 1879, William Tecumseh Sherman, General in Chief of the U.S. Army, delivered a variant of his famous "War Is Hell" speech to the graduating class. A total of 10,000 people arrived to listen to Sherman's speech, and the press reported that it was the largest number of people ever to gather within the township's boundaries (at that time the village of Orchard Lake was part of West Bloomfield Township). Some claim that he said: "There is many a boy here today who looks upon war as all glory, but, boys, it is all hell"; however, the published text of Sherman's address does not contain that line. (Note: Some accounts of Sherman's speech do not mention that he said "war is hell", but many accounts note that a vague variation, like the one quoted, was spoken. The line as quoted more closely resembles Sherman's speech of August 11, 1880, at Columbus, Ohio; see Robert L. O'Connell, Fierce Patriot: The Tangled Lives of William Tecumseh Sherman, p. 326.)

Future City of Detroit Mayor, Cadet John C. Lodge, recorded his memories of the Sherman speech, "At one of our graduation exercises the speaker was General William T. Sherman. He was not eloquent, and he didn't have a very pleasant voice; it was somewhat shrill."

== Student life ==
With a tuition of $500 per year in the 1800s (about $16,000 in 2022), M.M.A. attracted mostly sons of wealthy upper class businessmen. There were three levels of training at the school: Infantry, Artillery, and Cavalry. The cadets wore gray and white uniforms, modeled after those that were worn at West Point. Students with musical abilities were encouraged to join the marching band. All cadets were taught to use a .45 caliber Springfield rifle, and the academy had an 8-inch siege mortar and Gatling guns at its disposal for military drills. There were a few accidents; in 1884, a cadet drowned during a training exercise in the lake. In 1889, another cadet drowned during a midnight swim.

The cadets had a busy schedule, even on weekends. Rogers and his staff allowed for holiday parties and arranged dances with nearby all-girls schools. Discipline was harsh and there were many athletic and extracurricular activities and the students were encouraged to participate. There were several hundred dropouts throughout the academy's history.

== Campus ==
There were a total of 19 buildings on the campus. The oldest building on the campus is Copeland's "castle", built in 1858, and it is still in use. The Academic Building (pictured above) was completed in 1890 and it was the center of academic life on campus. Additional buildings, include a Riding Hall (1881), Cadets Barracks (1884), Engine House (1889), Gymnasium (1896). There were also several barns, and these and many other buildings were demolished, replaced, or destroyed by fire throughout the academy's short history.

As Rogers extended the campus, he dug a network of tunnels to connect most of the buildings. In the event of an attack, the tunnels would provide easy access across campus. The tunnels also led to a large bomb shelter under the Engine House. The tunnels are now used for plumbing, electricity, ethernet, and other utilities.

== Bankruptcy and post-peak years ==
In 1900, Rogers undertook a massive building project, with a total of nine buildings planned at a cost of $350,000 (about $13 million in 2022). In December of that year, students and teachers protested against mistreatment and unsatisfactory meals. Rogers, who was terminally ill at the time, quickly fired several teachers whom he blamed for instigating the complaints. Rogers died in September 1901 and management of the school was left to Rogers' widowed wife and his friend Gen. Charles King. Enrollment declined sharply, and the academy sank into debt and then bankruptcy before being closed in 1908.

== Notable faculty and administrators ==
- George Oscar Cress, professor of Military Science and Tactics from 1904 to 1908
- Adelbert Cronkhite, professor of Military Science and Tactics, 1891 to 1892
- Henry W. Lord, U.S. Congressman, MMA trustee from 1878 to 1880
- J. Sumner Rogers, founder and superintendent
- Harry Lovejoy Rogers, son of J. Sumner Rogers, school quartermaster from 1887 to 1898, U.S. Army major general He was the school's quartermaster with the rank of major from 1887 to 1897, and commandant of cadets from 1897 to 1898.
- Frederick S. Strong, US Army major general who served as a professor of military science from 1884 to 1888 and 1892 to 1895, and superintendent from 1902 to 1904
- Edwin B. Winans, professor of Military Science and Tactics from 1897 to 1898

== Notable alumni ==
- Harry Archer, musician and composer
- Daniel Read Anthony Jr., U.S. Congressman from Kansas, 1907 to 1929
- Sewell Avery, chairman of the board of Montgomery Ward
- John A. Bloomingston, college athlete and attorney
- Edgar Rice Burroughs, author of the Tarzan novels. He later spent time on the school's faculty.
- Kurtis Froedtert, Physician, businessman, and philanthropist
- George Schuyler Hodges, artist, inventor, and automobile executive
- Frank P. Lahm, U.S. military aviation pioneer, brigadier general in the United States Army Air Corps
- John C. Lodge, mayor of Detroit from 1923–1924 and 1927–1928
- Fenton R. McCreery, U.S. diplomat
- William K. Naylor, US Army brigadier general
- Truman Handy Newberry, United States Senator from Michigan, 1919–1922
- Sylvester H. Scovel, war correspondent
- Walter Cowen Short, MMA faculty 1890–1891, US Army brigadier general
- Frederic L. Smith, automobile executive
- George Veazey Strong, commander of the Military Intelligence Corps during World War II
- Clayton Teetzel, college athlete and coach
- Harry Van Surdam, athlete, musician, superintendent of El Paso Military Institute

== The Seminary and other schools ==
Two years after the Academy closed, in 1910, Fr. Joseph Dabrowski, the director of the Polish Seminary of Detroit, purchased the campus and moved his school there. The seminary has stayed there to this day. It is now called SS. Cyril and Methodius Seminary. The campus is also home to St. Mary's Preparatory, and Madonna University of Livonia, Michigan holds some classes on the campus.

== See also ==
- Saint Mary's Preparatory
- Saint Mary's College
- SS. Cyril and Methodius Seminary

== See also ==
- National Register of Historic Places listings in Oakland County, Michigan

== Bibliography ==
- Lodge, John Christian (1949). I Remember Detroit. Detroit: Wayne University Press. ISBN 0-7812-8581-X. OCLC 415215.
- Bohnett, Brian J., Them Was The Days: Edgar Rice Burroughs and the History of the Michigan Military Academy (2001)
- Martinez, Charles H., Song of the Heron: Reflections on the History of West Bloomfield (2004)
- Merrill, James M., William Tecumseh Sherman (1971)
