= Harry Lovejoy Rogers =

U.S. Army major general

Harry L. Rogers
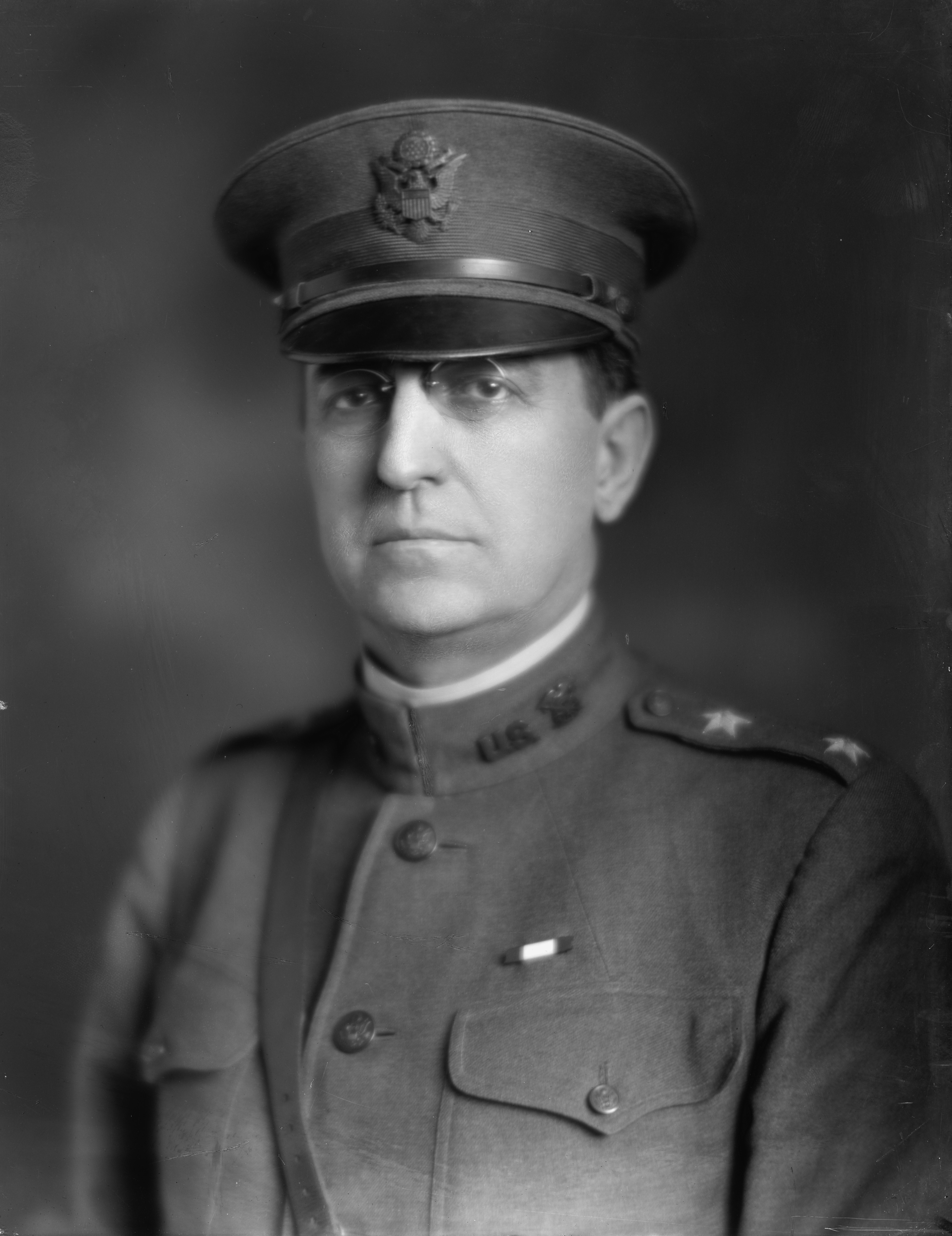
- Born: January 29, 1867; Washington, D.C., US
- Died: December 12, 1925 (aged 58); Philadelphia, Pennsylvania, US
- Burial place: Arlington National Cemetery
- Spouse: Harriet Pray (m. 1892–1925, his death)
- Children: 2
- Military career
- Allegiance: United States
- Branch: Michigan Militia; United States Army
- Service years: 1887–1898 (Militia); 1898–1922 (Army)
- Rank: Major (Militia); Major General (Army)
- Unit: U.S. Army Quartermaster Corps
- Commands: Quartermaster General of the United States Army
- Conflicts: Spanish–American War; United States occupation of Veracruz; Pancho Villa Expedition; World War I
- Awards: Army Distinguished Service Medal

Harry Lovejoy Rogers (January 29, 1867 – December 12, 1925) was an officer in the United States Army. A specialist in quartermaster and food service activities, Rogers attained the rank of major general, and was most notable for his service as chief quartermaster of the American Expeditionary Forces during World War I and Quartermaster General of the United States Army from 1918 to 1922.

== Early life ==
Harry Lovejoy Rogers was born in Washington, D.C., on January 29, 1867, a son of J. Sumner Rogers and Jeanette Susan Wheeler Rogers. Sumner Rogers was superintendent of Michigan Military Academy beginning in 1877, and Harry Rogers was educated at MMA. After graduating in 1884, he attended the Massachusetts Institute of Technology. In 1886, Rogers joined the staff at the academy and received a commission in the Michigan Militia. He was the school's quartermaster with the rank of major from 1887 to 1897, and commandant of cadets from 1897 to 1898.

== Start of career ==
At the start of the Spanish–American War, Rogers volunteered for Army service and was commissioned as a major in the Pay Department on May 2, 1898. He served as chief paymaster in Puerto Rico, then served at Fort Sheridan, Illinois as assistant to the chief paymaster of the Department of the Lakes. In February 1904, Rogers was transferred to the Department of Dakota in Saint Paul, Minnesota as chief paymaster. In 1906, Rogers was posted to Washington, D.C., as assistant to the Army's Paymaster General.

Rogers was next assigned to the Philippine Division as chief paymaster, followed by assignment to New York City as the Eastern Division's chief paymaster. He was promoted to lieutenant colonel in 1907.

== Continued career ==
In August 1912, the Army merged the Pay, Quartermaster, and Subsistence Departments to form the Quartermaster Corps. Rogers was assigned as Chief of the Finance Division in the Office of the Quartermaster General. He served until 1914, and was commended for efforts to systematize and modernize accounting and payroll records.

As quartermaster of the Southern Department, Rogers was responsible for supplying forces deployed during the United States occupation of Veracruz. From March to October 1915, Rogers was detailed as quartermaster of the 2nd Division in Texas City, Texas. The division took part in the defense of the Mexico–United States border during the Pancho Villa Expedition, and Rogers was commended by the division commander for his handling of the organization's supplies. In August 1915, a hurricane struck the Texas coast and caused extensive damage. Units of the 2nd Division were assigned to other posts in Texas, and Rogers returned to the Southern Department.

Rogers' efforts in Texas foreshadowed the Army's quartermaster needs during World War I. Under his leadership, supply specialists provided shelter, equipment, and supplies to 150,000 soldiers, including over 100,000 mobilized National Guardsmen. The Pancho Villa expedition was also the first time the Army used motor vehicles on a large scale, and Rogers was responsible for purchasing fleets of cars and trucks. Following acquisition, the vehicles were shipped by train to Columbus, New Mexico, after which they were distributed to the units that needed them.

== World War I ==
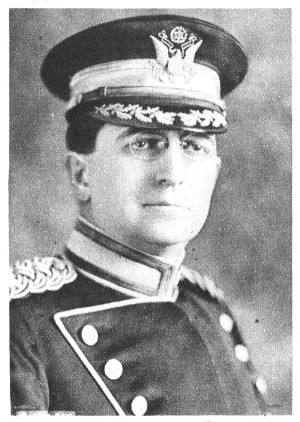
Rogers as a brigadier general in 1918

In June 1917, two months after the American entry into World War I, Rogers was assigned as chief quartermaster of the American Expeditionary Forces (AEF). Entrusted with supplying U.S. forces in France during the war, he was promoted to brigadier general in August. Among his innovations were field bakeries that assured constant supplies of bread, the largest ice making plant under one roof in the world, a system of storing and distributing gasoline, creation of the Motor Transport Corps and Graves Registration Service, establishment of laundry and bathing facilities, and a salvage service.

Rogers was appointed Quartermaster General of the United States Army with the rank of major general on July 22, 1918. He remained in France until February 1919, when he returned to the United States to assume his new duties. For his World War I service, Rogers was a recipient of the Army Distinguished Service Medal. The citation for the medal reads:

The President of the United States of America, authorized by Act of Congress, July 9, 1918, takes pleasure in presenting the Army Distinguished Service Medal to Major General Harry L. Rogers, United States Army, for exceptionally meritorious and distinguished services to the Government of the United States, in a duty of great responsibility during World War I. General Rogers has organized, perfected, and administered with great efficiency the Quartermaster Department in France. He was able to meet each emergency in times fraught with untold difficulties, and by his energy and untiring zeal he has insured to our troops a prompt and constant supply of quartermaster stores, without which the ultimate success of our Army could not have been obtained.

In addition, he was a recipient of the Knight Commander of the Order of the Bath (Great Britain), Commander of the Order of the Crown (Italy), Commander of the Order of Leopold (Belgium), and Commander of the Legion of Honor (France).

== Later career ==
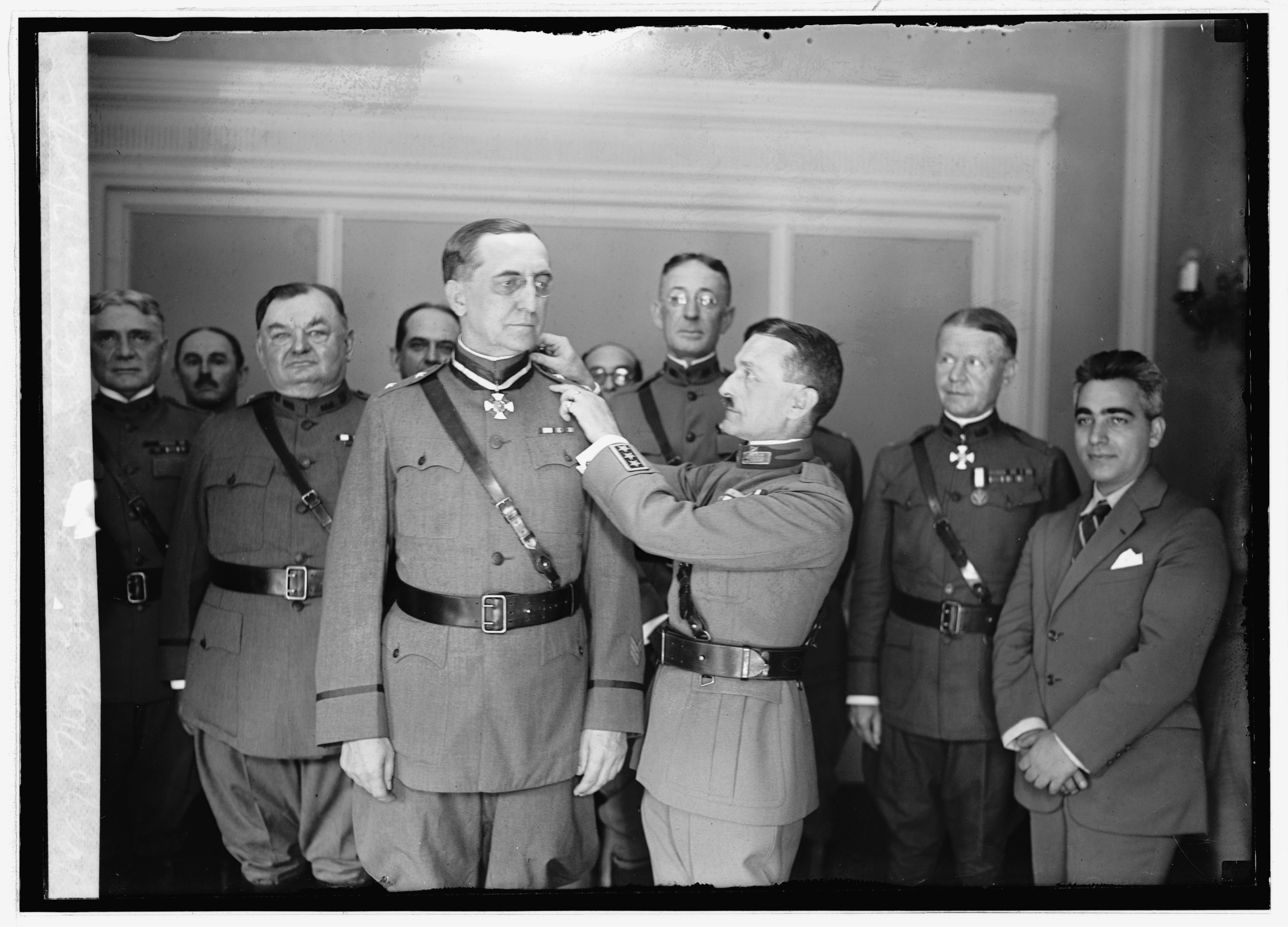
Rogers (center) receiving Italy's Order of the Crown in 1922

As quartermaster general, Rogers found that the Quartermaster Corps was split into the Transportation Service, Construction Division, Motor Transport Corps, and Purchase and Storage Division, all of which operated independently and reported directly to the War Department. Rogers believed this division to be the source of unnecessary expenses and bureaucracy, and worked to get these functions returned to the Quartermaster Corps.

When reorganization of the Army resulted from passage of the National Defense Act of 1920, the Quartermaster Corps reclaimed control of transportation and construction, but the Finance Department remained a separate branch. The Quartermaster Corps was responsible for all supplies common to two or more Army branches, and was to be organized as a cadre of specialists in the quartermaster field, rather than soldiers and officers detailed temporarily to quartermaster duty.

Another Rogers initiative during his tenure was the redesign of grave markers for veterans by a panel that included Rogers and John J. Pershing. Beginning with deceased veterans of World War I, gravestones were of the "General" design. Taller and thicker than the markers for veterans of previous wars, the General headstone was intended to indicate a distinction between veterans of the 19th century's wars and World War I. In addition, the General design enabled veterans to indicate religious preference through the addition of an Emblem of Belief (EOB). In August 1922, Rogers retired as the result of physical disabilities.

== Retirement and death ==
In retirement, Rogers was a resident of Philadelphia. He died there on December 12, 1925. Rogers was buried at Arlington National Cemetery.

== Family ==
In 1892, Rogers married Harriet Pray of Auburn, Maine. They were the parents of two children. Helen F. Rogers was the wife of Colonel Rodney H. Smith. Harry Lovejoy Rogers Jr. was a United States Military Academy graduate who attained the rank of colonel during World War II.

== Legacy ==
In 2015, Rogers was inducted into the Army Quartermaster Foundation's Hall of Fame.

In 1939, the Army contracted for construction of a tugboat, which was christened Maj. Gen. Harry L. Rogers. The boat was used by the Quartermaster Corps until the early 1960s, when it was transferred to the Department of the Interior and then the government of the U.S. Virgin Islands.
