= George Schuyler Hodges =

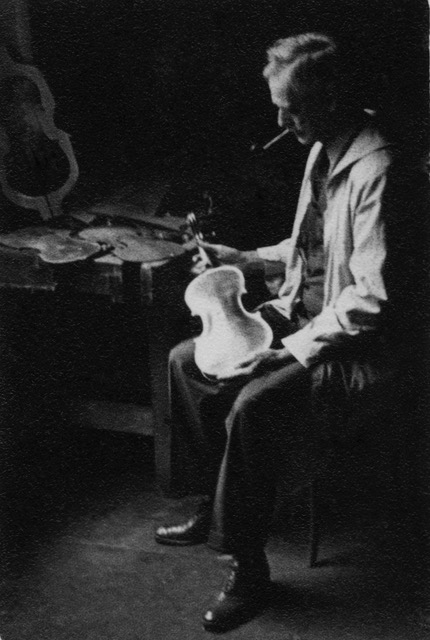
- Hodges holding a violin he made
- Born: May 3, 1864; Pontiac, Michigan, US
- Died: April 11, 1953 (aged 88)
- Education: Académie Julian, École des Beaux-Arts, Michigan Military Academy
- Occupations: Inventor and painter
- Spouse: Agnes Idaline Bacon Hodges

George Schuyler Hodges (3 March 1864 – 11 April 1953) was an American artist, inventor, and automobile industry pioneer. He invented and held patents for some of the first modern cameras, lawn mowers, and breech-loading firearms. He was a fixture of society in Detroit where he was a charter member of the Scarab Club and built the Pine Lake Country Clubhouse, Rotunda Inn and several other buildings in the neighborhood.

== Early life ==
George S. Hodges was born to Ira Gardner and Mariva (Rose) Hodges at his family's hotel, the Hodges House, in Pontiac, Michigan. The hotel was built by his grandfather, Schuyler Hodges. At the time it was erected, it was the largest hotel west of Buffalo, New York.

Hodges attended the local school in Pontiac and, later, the Michigan Military Academy at Orchard Lake.

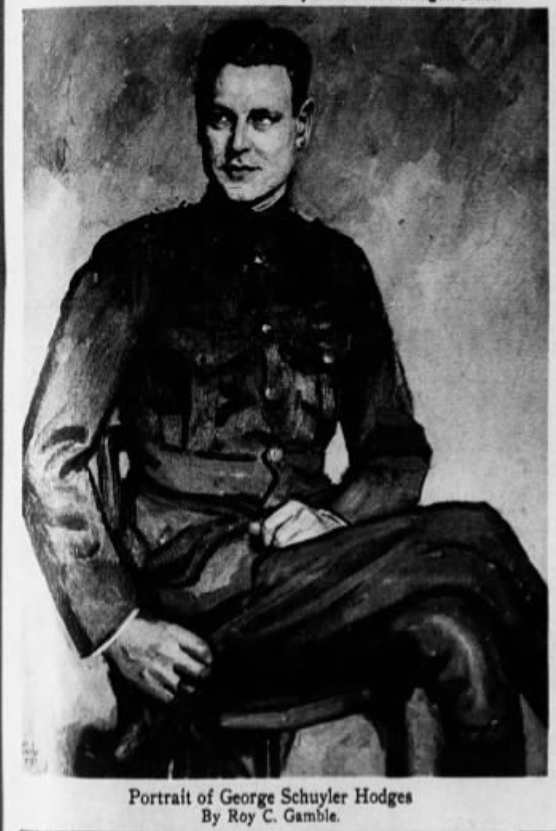
This is a portrait of George Seward Hodges by Roy C. Gamble which was published by the Detroit Free Press on January 12, 1930. (It is mislabeled as the father's name rather than accurately his son's.)

In 1892, Hodges traveled to Paris to study art. He studied for three years at the Académie Julian and the Ecole des Beaux Arts (Paris) under Jean-Léon Gérôme. His work was shown at Detroit art exhibits and at other prominent art showings throughout the country.

He continued to paint as a hobby throughout his life and remained active in the local arts community. He was a friend of fellow Detroit-native and American impressionist painter Roy Charles Gamble. Gamble painted a portrait of Hodges' son, also George S. Hodges, as a young man in military uniform, which was printed in the Detroit Free Press.

== Career ==
Hodges organized the Hodges Vehicle Co. which made horse-drawn carriages and buggies in the late 1800s. The company closed in 1904.

Later, Hodges was named secretary of the Welch Motor Car Company, which was one of the most prominent automobile companies in Pontiac. The company was later absorbed by General Motors.

Hodges was a close associate of Henry Ford when Ford was starting his auto manufacturing business. Hodges was given credit for developing the first closed-body Ford car.

He held several patents including one for a modern lawn mower motor, U.S. Patent 1610444A; one for a cartridge-loading device for a breech-loading firearm, U.S. Patent 863798A; and one for the first reflex camera and cut film pack, U.S. Patent 494354.

He married Agnes Bacon in 1888. Her father was Levi Bacon, who served as chief clerk of the U.S. Patent Office in Washington, D. C.
