= Michigan Brigade =

Cavalry unit of the American Civil War

The Michigan Brigade, sometimes called the Wolverines, the Michigan Cavalry Brigade or Custer's Brigade, was a brigade of cavalry in the volunteer Union Army during the later half of the American Civil War. Composed primarily of the 1st Michigan Cavalry, 5th Michigan Cavalry, 6th Michigan Cavalry and 7th Michigan Cavalry, the Michigan Brigade fought in every major campaign of the Army of the Potomac from the Battle of Gettysburg in July 1863 to the Confederate surrender at Appomattox Court House in April 1865.

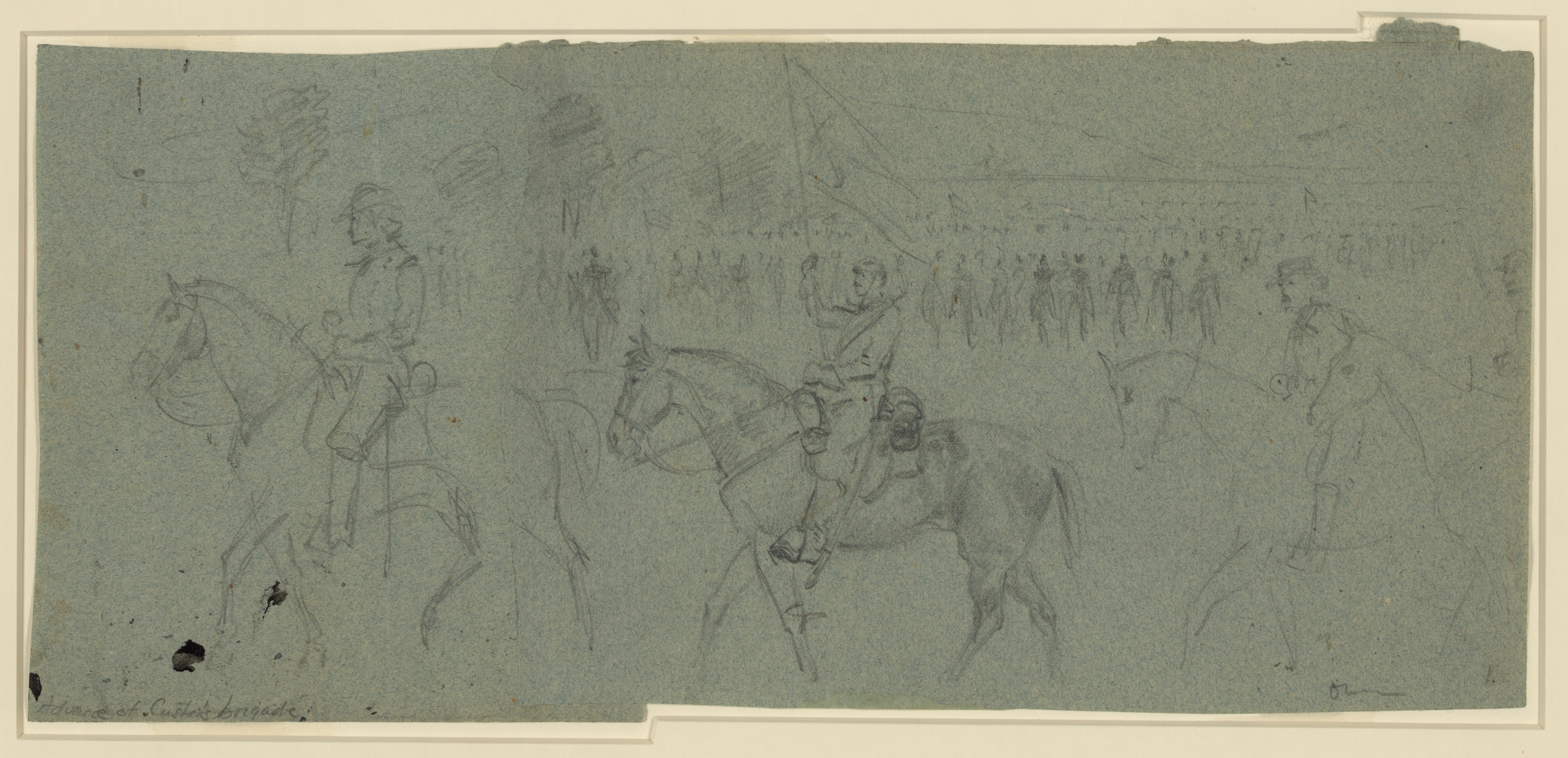
Advance of Custer's Brigade by Alfred Waud

The brigade first gained fame during the Gettysburg campaign under the command of youthful Brigadier General George Armstrong Custer. After the war, several men associated with the brigade joined the 7th U.S. Cavalry Regiment and later fought again under Custer in the Old West frontier.

== Service record ==
=== Organization and the Gettysburg Campaign ===
The Michigan Cavalry Brigade was created on December 12, 1862, at Washington, D.C. It originally consisted of the 5th, 6th and 7th Michigan Cavalry regiments, under the command of General Joseph T. Copeland. During the early part of the 1863 Gettysburg campaign, the 1st Michigan Cavalry and Battery M, 2nd United States Artillery were added to the brigade in central Maryland as part of a major reorganization of the Army of the Potomac's Cavalry Corps by its commander, Alfred Pleasonton.

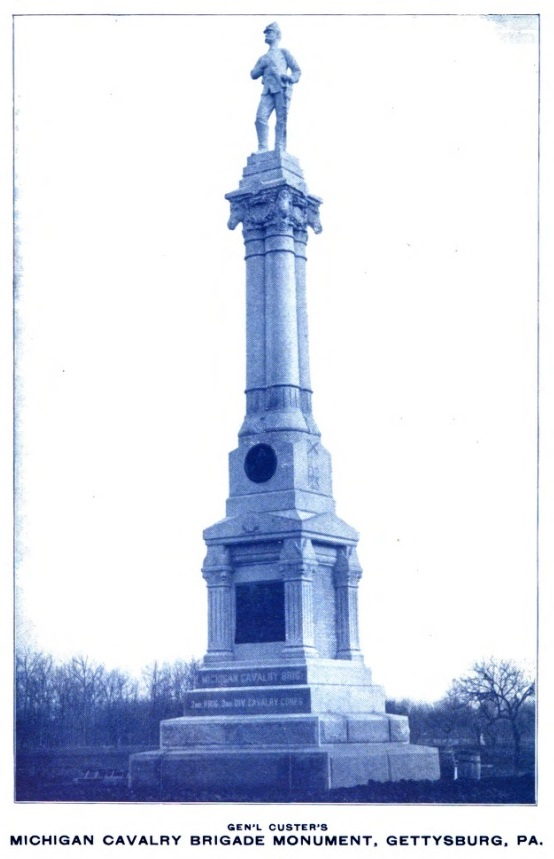
Michigan Cavalry Brigade Monument

The larger brigade was assigned to the newly promoted Custer, who assumed command near Westminster, Maryland. The Michigan Brigade saw its first combat action as an entity at the Battle of Hanover in southern Pennsylvania on June 30, 1863. There, Custer's men were deployed as a strong advance skirmish line south of town. Two days later, on July 2, the brigade participated in the Battle of Hunterstown, where one of the Wolverines, Norville Churchill, rescued a fallen Custer, who was pinned in the road under his slain horse.

At the subsequent Battle of Gettysburg, the Michigan Brigade was posted east of Gettysburg along the Hanover Road on July 3. On the third day, the brigade fought in piecemeal fashion, with the 5th and 6th serving as dismounted skirmishers near the John Rummel farm on the left of the battlefield, while first the 7th and then the 1st Michigan charged into a growing mounted melee in the center. Custer's cry of "Come on, you Wolverines!" became the rallying cry of the brigade.

During the retreat of the Army of Northern Virginia from Gettysburg, Custer's men maintained a series of skirmishes and encounters with the Confederate rear guard, fighting another battle at Falling Waters as the last of Robert E. Lee's army slipped across the Potomac River. The skirmishing continued well into Virginia, including a minor affair at Amissville.

=== Bristoe and Mine Run Campaigns ===
During the balance of 1863, the Michigan Brigade performed scouting and patrol duty, as well as screening the flanks of the Army of the Potomac. The brigade again engaged in a series of fights with J.E.B. Stuart's Confederates during the Bristoe Campaign and the subsequent Mine Run Campaign.

=== 1864 ===
For a time, the 1st Vermont Cavalry was assigned to the Michigan Brigade.

In February 1864, the Michigan Brigade participated in Judson Kilpatrick's large 5,000-man cavalry raid on the Confederacy's capital city, Richmond, Virginia. Kilpatrick's objectives for the daring raid were to free Federal prisoners of war, cut supply lines, and create panic among the Confederate civilians and government officials. Carrying only rations for two days, the troopers were expected to live off the land by foraging for food. Kilpatrick's men severed all the rail lines between Richmond and the Army of Northern Virginia, but did not enter Richmond or free the prisoners.

During the Overland Campaign in May, the Michigan men were engaged in Philip H. Sheridan's raid, fighting at the Battle of Haw's Shop on May 28. There, due to the heavily wooded terrain, Custer dismounted the brigade and deployed in a long, double-ranked line of battle, as if they were infantrymen. However, Custer inspired his men by staying mounted as he led them forward, waving his hat in full view of the enemy. Some of the relatively inexperienced South Carolina Confederate infantry mistook a Union shift in position for a retreat and charged after them, only to run into Custer's men, who captured eighty Confederates. Forty-one Michigan cavalrymen fell in the attack, but their enthusiastic charge caused Wade Hampton's men to withdraw.

At Trevilian Station on June 11 and 12, the brigade was heavily engaged. Custer maneuvered into a position in the rear of (and between) two Confederate divisions and seized the train depot and a large cache of supplies. However, subsequent enemy movements left the Michigan Brigade nearly surrounded, and Custer had to fight his way out of the encirclement.

In July, the brigade rode to Washington, D.C. en route to the Shenandoah Valley, then threatened by a Confederate force under Jubal A. Early. The Michigan Brigade was engaged at Winchester, Virginia, on August 11, as well as in numerous other small engagements through September, when it fought at the Battle of Opequon, also near Winchester, where it captured three Confederate battle flags. The brigade was again in action at the Battle of Fisher's Hill.

On September 26, Custer was promoted to divisional command and Colonel James H. Kidd of the 6th Michigan assumed direct command of the Michigan Brigade. The brigade spent the rest of the year in the Valley, engaging in a series of running fights with Confederate cavalry, including the decisive victory over Jubal Early at the Battle of Cedar Creek.

=== 1865 ===
On February 27, General Sheridan commenced a major movement against Early's remaining forces in the Valley and his communications and supply lines. The Michigan Brigade participated in an engagement at Louisa Court House against enemy cavalry under Thomas L. Rosser, routing the Confederates and capturing the village and its important stores of military supplies.

Not long afterward, following Early's final crushing defeat at the Battle of Waynesboro, Sheridan's force was reassigned to the Richmond area to help Ulysses S. Grant's final push to break Lee's entrenchments. The Michigan Brigade arrived at White House, landing in time to participate in some of the final engagements of the Army of the Potomac, including the Battle of Five Forks on April 1. They were active in the pursuit of Lee's retreating army following the fall of Richmond and again engaged the Confederates at the Battle of Sayler's Creek on April 6. They were among the troops that finally blocked Lee's planned escape route, precipitating the surrender of the Army of Northern Virginia at Appomattox Court House.

Under the command of Colonel Peter Stagg, the Michigan Brigade was part of Sheridan's force that rode southward to Petersburg, Virginia, and then proceeded into North Carolina to assist William T. Sherman's army in its quest to defeat another Confederate army under Joseph E. Johnston. However, Johnston surrendered before Sheridan arrived. The Michigan Brigade returned to Washington, D.C., for the Grand Review of the Armies on May 23.

=== Western frontier duty ===
Immediately after the review, the Michigan Brigade received orders to serve in the Western frontier in the District of the Plains, Department of Missouri. Using railroads and a series of riverboats, the brigade arrived at Fort Leavenworth, Kansas, 2,300 strong but with only 600 horses. There, the 5th Michigan was formally mustered out of the service, as well as portions of the other three regiments whose enlistments had expired, in all half the brigade. The remaining troopers saw subsequent duty in the Dakota Territory in the forces of Patrick Connor until December.

In late 1865, the remnants of the much depleted brigade were consolidated into the 1st Michigan Veteran Cavalry and served in the Montana Territory. Despite the fact that their term of enlistment had expired, the remaining men were kept in the service until March 10, 1866, when they were finally mustered out and allowed to return home to Michigan. Some men elected to stay on the frontier and enlist in Custer's 7th U.S. Cavalry; a few former members of the Michigan Brigade fought at the Battle of Little Big Horn in June 1876.

Most veterans of the Michigan Brigade were active in various fraternal organizations such as the Grand Army of the Republic, and many men returned to Gettysburg for the 25th Anniversary commemorations. A few returned in 1913 for the 50th Anniversary.

A modern non-profit group calling itself the Michigan Cavalry Brigade Association serves as living historians and reenactors.
