= J. Sumner Rogers =

American educator and U.S. Army officer

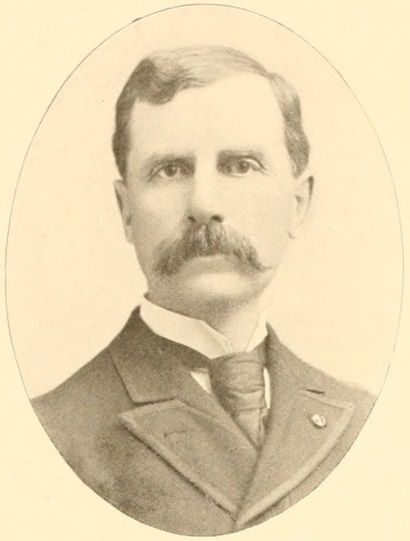
- From 1902's Officers of the Army and Navy (Volunteer) Who Served in the Civil War
- Born: July 5, 1844; Orrington, Maine, U.S.
- Died: September 14, 1901 (aged 57); Orchard Lake Village, Michigan, U.S.
- Burial place: Oak Hill Cemetery, Orrington, Maine, U.S.
- Spouse: Jeanette Susan Wheeler (m. 1866–1901, his death)
- Children: 3
- Military career
- Allegiance: Union (American Civil War); United States
- Branch: Union Army; United States Army; Michigan Militia
- Service years: 1861–1863, 1864–1865 (Union Army); 1867–1877 (United States Army); 1877–1901 (Militia)
- Rank: Major (Brevet) (Union Army); First Lieutenant (United States Army); Colonel (Militia)
- Unit: U.S. Army Infantry Branch
- Commands: Company M, 31st Maine Volunteer Infantry Regiment; Michigan Military Academy
- Conflicts: American Civil War

Joseph Sumner Rogers (July 5, 1844 – September 14, 1901) was an American educator and United States Army officer. A native of Orrington, Maine, he was a veteran of the American Civil War and was most notable as the founder and longtime superintendent of Michigan Military Academy.

== Early life ==
Joseph Sumner Rogers was born in Orrington, Maine on July 5, 1844, the son of Joseph Rogers and Joanna Swett Harriman. Rogers was a descendant of Thomas Rogers, a passenger on the Mayflower. He was educated in the schools of Orrington and left at age 16 to join the Union Army during the American Civil War.

== Start of career ==
In April 1861, Rogers joined the 2nd Maine Volunteer Infantry. He took part in the First Battle of Bull Run in July 1861, and continued his service during George B. McClellan's 1862 Peninsula campaign. Rogers sustained a severe wound to the face during his participation in the August 1862 Second Battle of Bull Run. While in Maine for convalescent leave, Rogers completed his education at the academy in Bucksport, Maine. He was mustered out at the end of his enlistment in June 1863.

Rogers returned to service in September 1864 when he was commissioned as a first lieutenant in the 31st Maine Volunteer Infantry Regiment. He served in the Battles of the Wilderness, Spottsylvania, Cold Harbor, Petersburg, Crater, Second Weldon Railroad, and Poplar Springs Church. The regiment then performed garrison duty in and around Petersburg, Virginia until the Confederate surrender, and it took part in the Grand Review of the Armies in May 1865. Rogers was promoted to captain as commander of the regiment's Company M in October, 1864 and major by brevet in March, 1865. He was mustered out with his regiment on July 15, 1865.

== Continued career ==
In October 1867, Rogers was appointed a second lieutenant in the United States Army and assigned to duty with the 1st Infantry Regiment. He served with the regiment in Louisiana during the Reconstruction era, and was later posted to Fort Wayne in Detroit.

While on duty at Fort Wayne in 1872, Rogers was appointed professor of military science and tactics at Detroit High School and commander of the Detroit Cadets, Detroit high school students organized as military drill and ceremony teams. He commanded the corps with the Michigan Militia rank of major until 1876, including performances at the Centennial Exposition in Philadelphia. Rogers resigned from the army in 1877, intending to found a military school.

Later in 1877, Rogers obtained financial backing to purchase the estate of Joseph T. Copeland in Orchard Lake Village, Michigan. He organized the Michigan Military Academy, a boarding school modeled after the United States Military Academy. Rogers was able to capitalize on friendships he had created during the Civil War to increase the school's profile. In 1879, William Tecumseh Sherman, the Commanding General of the United States Army, spoke to MMA's graduating class, an event with an audience of 10,000.

Rogers served as the school's superintendent with the militia rank of colonel. During his tenure at MMA, its drill and ceremony teams won several national competitions and took part in events at the 1893 World's Columbian Exposition. Despite the school's success, an expansion begun in 1900 caused the school to incur debt it had difficulty paying off. Rogers, who was terminally ill, was unable to lead as effectively as he had earlier, and the school continued to founder.

== Personal life ==
=== Civic and fraternal ===
Rogers was a member of the Freemasons and Knights Templar. He was also a member of the Grand Army of the Republic and Military Order of the Loyal Legion of the United States. Rogers also belonged to the Sons of the American Revolution, Mayflower Society and Hereditary Order of Descendants of Colonial Governors.

=== Death and burial ===
Rogers died in Orchard Lake on September 14, 1901. He was buried at Oak Hill Cemetery in Orrington, Maine.

=== Family ===
In 1866, Rogers married Jeanette Susan Wheeler (1845–1920). They were the parents of three children. Son Harry Lovejoy Rogers (1867–1925) graduated from MMA, joined the Army for the Spanish–American War, and attained the rank of major general during World War I. Daughter Florence (1878–1890) died of illness at age 12. Frederick P. Rogers (1881-1946) was a businessman and Army officer who attained the rank of major during World War I.

== Legacy ==
Michigan Military Academy continued to operate until 1908, when it declared bankruptcy and was closed. The MMA property was listed on the National Register of Historic Places in 1982 as the Orchard Lake Schools Historic District.
