= Płużnica Wielka =

- Village
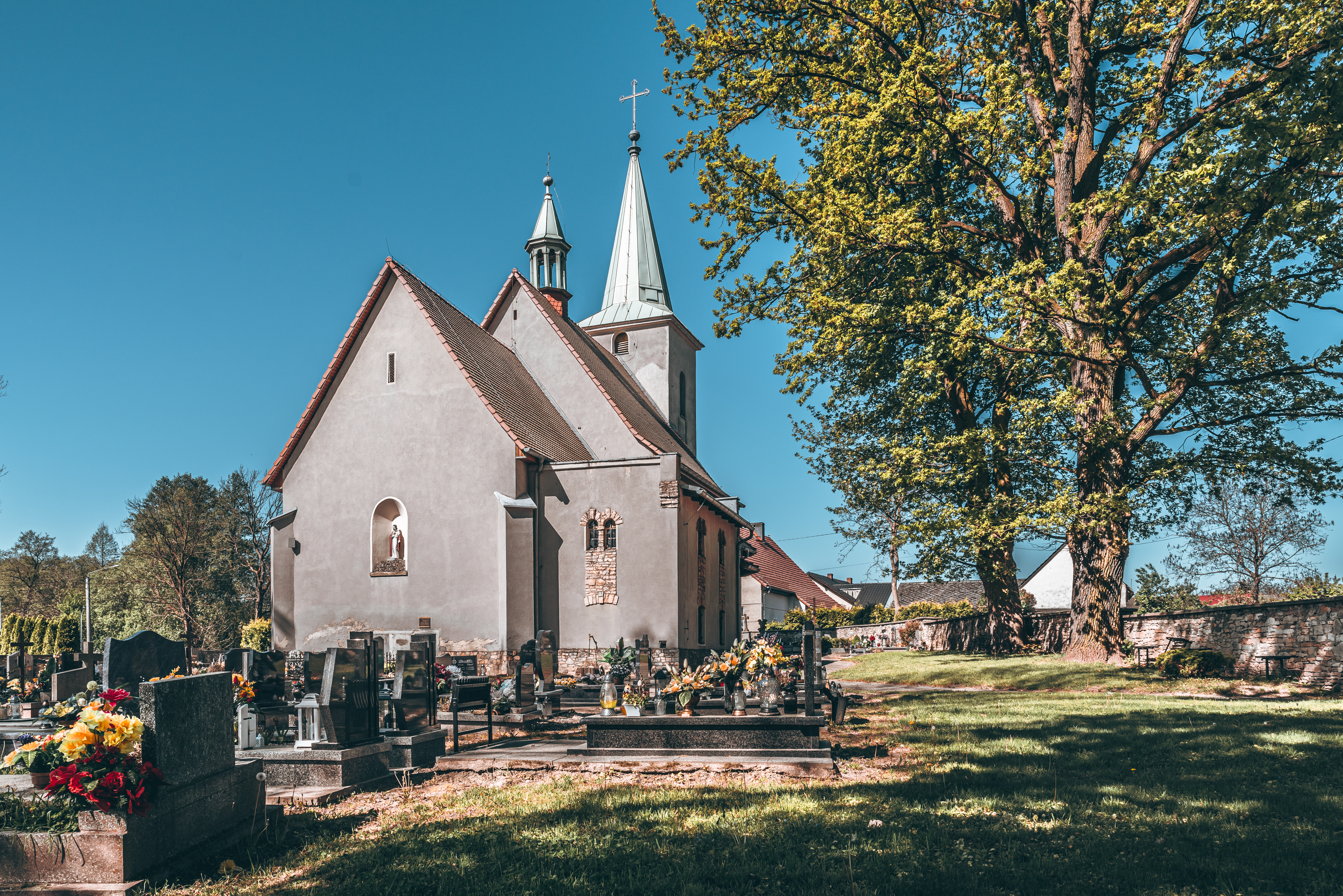
- Church of the Visitation and cemetery

- Location within Poland
- Coordinates: 50°28′N 18°27′E
- Country: Poland
- Voivodeship: Opole
- County: Strzelce
- Gmina: Strzelce Opolskie
- Time zone: UTC+1 (CET)
  - Summer (DST): UTC+2 (CEST)
- Vehicle registration: OST

Płużnica Wielka [pwuʐˈnit͡sa ˈvjɛlka] (German: Groß Pluschnitz) is a village in the administrative district of Gmina Strzelce Opolskie, within Strzelce County, Opole Voivodeship, in southern Poland.

It was the birthplace, in 1824, of Fr. Leopold Moczygemba, who led the migration that founded the Polish settlements of Panna Maria and Bandera, Texas.

24 Polish citizens were murdered by Nazi Germany in the village during World War II.
