= Sylvester H. Scovel =

American journalist

Sylvester "Harry" Scovel
- Born: July 29, 1869; Pittsburgh, Pennsylvania, U.S.
- Died: February 13, 1905 (aged 35); Havana, Cuba
- Education: Wooster University, Wooster, Ohio; University of Michigan
- Occupations: Journalist, foreign correspondent

Sylvester Henry Scovel (July 29, 1869 – February 13, 1905) was an American journalist and engineer. He was the third of five children of Caroline Woodruff and Dr. Sylvester Fithian Scovel, a Presbyterian minister who served as president of the University of Wooster (now College of Wooster), in Wooster, Ohio, from 1883 to 1899.

At about the age 16, Scovel indicated to his parents his lack of interest in religious training and his intention to seek work as an engineer. However, later Scovel returned to Wooster University. Afterwards Henry Scovel attended the Michigan Military Academy, graduating in 1877 and enrolling at the University of Michigan in the fall. Halfway through his sophomore year, despite his excelling on the athletic field and performing well in the classroom, Scovel, restless, dropped out. From time to time he would send articles on conditions there to Cleveland newspapers. He also provided occasional articles about the club's activities to the Pittsburgh Dispatch.

His imagination and sympathies stirred by the revolution taking place in Cuba, he headed to New York, where he made arrangements to work as a foreign correspondent for the Herald, a paper well-regarded for its reporting of international news. An editor promised Scovel $24 per dispatch for the information he could smuggle out about the Spanish–Cuban conflict.

== War coverage ==
Sylvester Henry "Harry" Scovel was one of the most celebrated journalists of the Spanish–American War.

Sylvester Scovel had never planned to become a yellow kid journalist or the correspondent covering the Spanish–American War for Joseph Pulitzer's New York newspaper, The World. His dispatches from Cuba about alleged Spanish atrocities before the war, the American war effort in Cuba, and those about the sinking of the Maine in Havana Harbor gave him a national publicity.

Scovel landed in Cienfuegos on the southern coast. After some initial difficulties in eluding Spanish authorities as he tried to slip out of town, he headed to the backcountry in search of the army of General Maximo Gomez, the Cuban insurgent chief in the eastern provinces. Scovel arrived in November, "traveling with the commander's personal staff," as the insurgents began their invasion of the western provinces. He sent his dispatches to New York through sympathetic Junta agents who smuggled them by boat to the U.S. But after three months, he had no idea if any of his work had made its way to the Herald. In an effort to locate American newspapers, early January 1896, while traveling with the rebel band of General Antonio Maceo, Scovel attempted to slip into Havana to check on his dispatches. In trying to pass through a sentry post as a 20-year-old Spanish speaking journalist, his bluff was called, and he was imprisoned in Havana's dreaded Morro Castle. Several days away from execution, he was visited by Dr. William Shaw Bowen, a correspondent for The New York World, who made a strong case to the Spanish authorities that they should not execute this college president's son. Scovel was released and directed to leave the country. But the young man had impressed the veteran political writer with his sincerity "to make a reputation as a war correspondent" that he was employed by The World.

He traveled on horseback with a typewriter and refused to carry a weapon of any kind, for to do so, he believed, would compromise his noncombatant status.

As quickly as Scovel became an ally valued by the Cubans, he was reviled by the Spanish for his reporting. Senor Sylvester was "the best known and most bitterly hated American in Cuba" (Bullard 410). The World's representative wrote numerous articles about the Spanish atrocities and had the information witnessed with signatures. He reported on Spanish and Cuban troop movements, their strengths and weaknesses and the devastating effects of the Spanish reconcentrado policy.

On February 23, 1896, Scovel published an exclusive interview with Gomez that enraged General Valeriano Weyler, Spanish governor of Cuba, who responded by posting a reward of $5,000 (Milton 95) and then $10,000 for The World correspondent's capture. Nursing a six-month-old gunshot wound that he incurred while witnessing an exchange of fire between the insurgents and the Spanish, Scovel left the country in disguise in August (Milton 100). On January 2, 1897, Scovel slipped back into Havana, risking arrest "at times when the execution of a little band of captured revolutionists by a firing squad was one of the regular early morning spectacles" ("Sylvester Scovel," February 13, 1905, 3). He met with American Consul-General Fitzhugh Lee, who wanted Scovel to locate Gomez and obtain the general's response to an American proposal for home rule in Cuba (Milton 143). Scovel accomplished his mission expeditiously. On January 4, he wrote, "I have been fortunate enough to get into Havana, get out of it again, and to find an insurgent force, all within twelve hours" ("Rebels Never More Hopeful," January 7, 1897, 1). The Spanish authorities seethed.

Scovel continued to elude capture until February 2, 1897, when he was arrested for a second time by Spanish officials, who claimed that the journalist had forfeited his recourse to the American Consulate by assisting the insurgents. A great outcry ensued. Newspapers in 87 U.S. cities ran editorials calling for Scovel's release. Congress, 14 state legislatures, as well as the Oklahoma territory and the city council of Columbus, Ohio, adopted resolutions calling for immediate governmental intervention (World, February 17-March 9, 1897). Journalist Richard Harding Davis and illustrator Frederic Remington published letters in The World protesting Scovel's unjust imprisonment. Davis argued Scovel's status as a non-combatant and concluded by threatening that if Scovel were to perish in Spanish hands, "HIS DEATH WILL FREE CUBA" ("Richard Harding Davis Writes," February 18, 1897, 1). Three days later, Remington called for greater State Department involvement and observed that "it must make [Scovel] sour on his country when he is abandoned this way" ("Fred Remington to The World," February 21, 1897, 1). On March 9, he was released and traveled back to New York, now one of the most famous correspondents in the nation.
