= Leopold Moczygemba =

Polish–American priest (1824–1891)

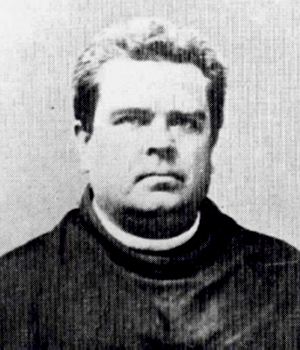

Personal life
- Born: October 18, 1824 Płużnica Wielka, Upper Silesia
- Died: February 23, 1891 (aged 66) Dearborn, Michigan
- Resting place: Panna Maria, Texas

Religious life
- Religion: Christianity
- Profession: November 18, 1844
- Ordination: July 25, 1847

Leopold Bonaventura Maria Moczygemba (October 18, 1824 – February 23, 1891) was the founder of the first Polish-American parish in Panna Maria and Bandera, Texas.

== Biography ==
Moczygemba was born in Płużnica Wielka to Leopold and Ewa Moczygemba (née Krawietz). He first attended local Catholic schools, later attending German-operated schools in Gliwice and Opole. By early 1843, he decided to join the Conventual Franciscans; he traveled to northern Italy in the fall of the same year to undergo his novitiate. He began his novitiate at Osimo on November 17, 1843, taking the religious name Bonaventura Maria. He was admitted to the Order with zero dissenting votes and made his profession on November 18, 1844, after which he was transferred to Ascoli Piceno, later transferred to Urbino on December 22, 1846. He was ordained a priest at Pesaro on July 25, 1847.

In the spring of 1848, Moczygemba was sent by his superiors to Würzburg to continue his studies while trying to improve his health. While there, he met Jean-Marie Odin, who had come to Europe to seek aid and missionaries for the Diocese of Galveston. Moczygemba would join joined Odin on the way back to America, and on September 14, 1852, he — alongside four other Conventual Franciscan friars — were given control over all German parishes in his Diocese. Moczygemba served as pastor for New Braunfels until February 1854, when he moved to Castroville, also becoming superior over the Franciscan missions in Texas. He also encouraged his family and friends from Upper Silesia to immigrate to the United States; approximately 200 peasants immigrated to the United States in December 1854, forming the community of Panna Maria, as well as the first Polish settlement, church, and school in the United States.

By October 1856, improved economic conditions in Upper Silesia — as well as a several drought in Texas — ended migration to Panna Maria, and Moczygemba was forced to leave by the angry Poles living there. Before leaving Panna Maria, however, he became a citizen of the United States on March 6, 1856. On October 1, 1858, he was appointed commissary general for a commissariate that comprised all Conventual Franciscan missions in America, a position he would serve in until 1866. On July 14, 1868, he assumed the position of penitentiary (a confessor for pilgrims) at St. Peter's Basilica. In 1870, he published the Enchiridion Sacerdotum Curam Animarum Agentium, a pocket ritual intended for missionaries in America written primarily in Latin, while also including professions of faith in both English and German.

After receiving temporary exclaustration from the Franciscans in order to care for his mother, Moczygemba returned to the United States in 1871, becoming a pastor at Litchfield, Illinois. He was later appointed pastor at Terre Haute, Indiana in 1873; Jeffersonville, Indiana in 1875; and Louisville, Kentucky in 1877. He helped found the Polish Roman Catholic Union of America, becoming its third president in June 1875. During his tenure as president, the PRCUA sponsored the settlement of land in central Nebraska by Polish migrants. On June 21, 1879, he left the Franciscan order to join the Resurrectionist Congregation. He also co-founded SS. Cyril and Methodius Seminary, a Polish seminary located in Orchard Lake, Michigan.

In spring 1888, Moczygemba requested to be permanently secularized; his request was approved, and he spent the rest of his life as a secular priest. He died on February 23, 1891 in Dearborn, Michigan, and was buried two days later at Mount Elliot Cemetery in Detroit, Michigan. His remains were reinterred in Panna Maria on October 13, 1974.

== Bibliography ==
- Baker, T. Lindsay (1979). The First Polish Americans: Silesian Settlements in Texas. College Station: Texas A&M University Press.
- Baker, T. Lindsay (1984). "The Reverend Leopold Moczygemba, Patriarch of Polonia". Polish American Studies. 41 (1).
- Swastek, Joseph (1951). Priest and Pioneer: Rev. Leopold Moczygemba. Detroit: Conventual.
- Seidner, Stanley S. (1976). In Quest of a Cultural Identity: An Inquiry for the Polish Community. New York, New York: IUME, Teachers College, Columbia University. ERIC collection: ED167674.
