= SS. Cyril and Methodius Seminary =

- U.S. Historic district – Contributing property
- Location within Michigan Location within the United States
- Location: Indian Trail, Orchard Lake, Michigan
- Coordinates: 42°35′38″N 83°21′28″W
- Built: 1858
- Architectural style: Gothic, Tudor Revival, Queen Anne
- Part of: Orchard Lake Schools Historic District (ID82002859)
- Designated CP: March 19, 1982

SS. Cyril and Methodius Seminary was a four-year private Polish seminary in Orchard Lake, Michigan, United States. The seminary, taking its name from Saints Cyril and Methodius, was founded in 1885 in Detroit, Michigan, to prepare candidates for the Roman Catholic priesthood primarily to serve Polish American immigrant communities. It closed in 2022.

== Early history ==
Approval for founding such a seminary was granted on January 14, 1879, by Pope Leo XIII upon the petition of Leopold Moczygemba, a Conventual Franciscan, founder of the Polish settlement in Panna Maria, Texas, in 1854.

The establishment of the seminary was realized by Father Joseph Dabrowski, the first rector, who obtained approval from Bishop Caspar Borgess of Detroit for constructing a building on St. Aubin Avenue between Forest Avenue and Garfield Street and organizing the seminary program.

== The move to Orchard Lake ==
Increasing enrollment and the need for additional space led the second rector, Father Witold Buchaczkowski, to transfer the seminary in 1909 from Detroit to the site of the former Michigan Military Academy in the rural village of Orchard Lake, northwest of Detroit.

== The early program ==
The original academic program of the seminary consisted of ten years of studies: five in the preparatory classical department and five in the upper division, namely, two in philosophy and three in theology. In 1927, three four-year administratively independent schools were established: SS. Cyril and Methodius Seminary, St. Mary's College, and St. Mary's Preparatory, known collectively at present as the Orchard Lake Schools.

== Academic programs ==
In 1968, the Seminary began to provide a training program for permanent deacons, field education for seminarians, and continuing education for adults. In the ensuing years, the following degree programs were introduced: Master of Divinity (1973) for priesthood candidates, religious, and lay women and men; Master of Religious Education (1977), later designated as Master of Arts in Religious Education (1989); and Master of Arts in Pastoral Ministry (1989), an upgrading of the Certificate in Pastoral Ministry, which had been in existence since 1975.

== Accreditation ==
In 1971, SS. Cyril and Methodius Seminary became an associate member of the Association of Theological Schools in the United States and Canada (ATS). In 1992 the seminary was granted candidacy for accredited status in the association and undertook a two-year self-study as part of the process leading toward accreditation. SS. Cyril and Methodius Seminary was granted initial accreditation by ATS in January, 1995.

== See also ==
- Polish Americans
- Polish Roman Catholic Union of America
- Roman Catholicism in Poland
- Polish Cathedral style
