= Orchard Lake Village, Michigan =

- City
- City of Orchard Lake Village
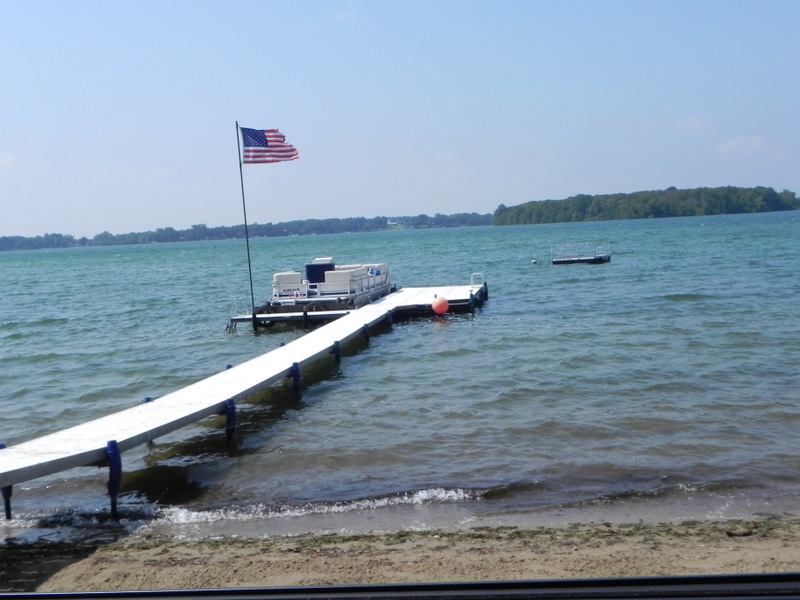
- View of Orchard Lake

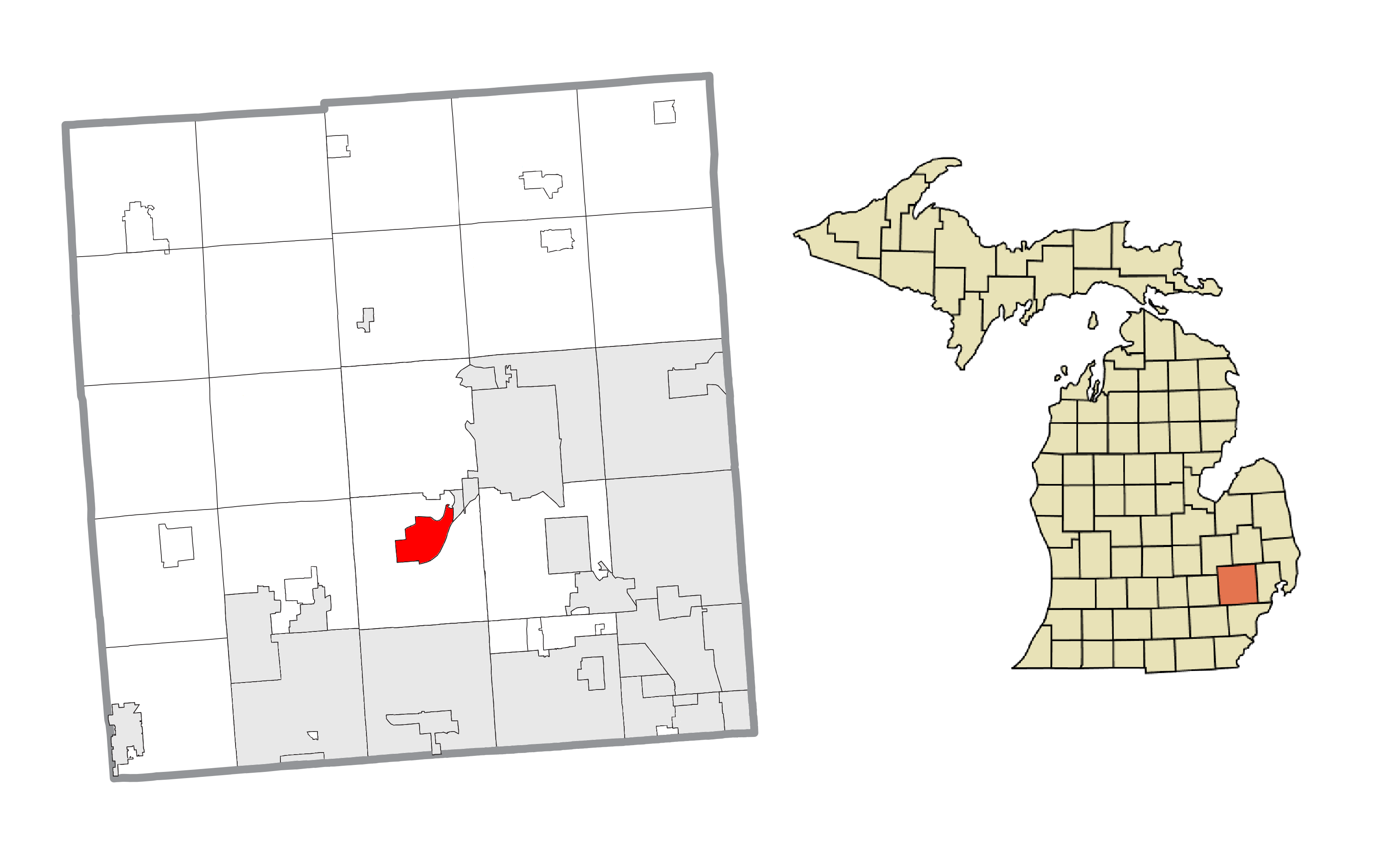
- Location within Oakland County

- Location within the state of Michigan
- Coordinates: 42°34′56″N 83°22′49″W
- Country: United States
- State: Michigan
- County: Oakland
- Incorporated: 1928 (village); 1964 (city)

Government
  - Type: Council–manager
  - Mayor: Norm Finkelstein
  - Clerk: Rhonda McClellan

Area
  - City: 4.05 sq mi (10.50 km^{2})
  - Land: 2.40 sq mi (6.21 km^{2})
  - Water: 1.66 sq mi (4.29 km^{2})

Population (2020)
  - City: 2,238
  - Density: 933.5/sq mi (360.41/km^{2})
  - Metro: 4,296,250 (Metro Detroit)
- Time zone: UTC-5 (EST)
  - Summer (DST): UTC-4 (EDT)
- ZIP code(s): 48323, 48324 (West Bloomfield)
- Area code: 248
- FIPS code: 26-61020
- GNIS feature ID: 634090
- Website: Official website

The City of Orchard Lake Village is a city in Oakland County in the U.S. state of Michigan. A northern suburb of Detroit, Orchard Lake Village is located roughly 27 miles (43.5 km) from downtown Detroit, and about 3 miles (4.8 km) southwest of Pontiac. The city is mostly surrounded by West Bloomfield Township, with a small northeast border with Keego Harbor. As of the 2020 census, Orchard Lake Village had a population of 2,238.

About 40% of the city's total area is water, with the main geographic feature being Orchard Lake, which occupies about 30% of the city's total area. Orchard Lake Village is home to St. Mary's Preparatory and SS. Cyril and Methodius Seminary, in addition to the Orchard Lake Country Club and Pine Lake Country Club. It is also the home of Orchard Lake St. Mary's Preparatory and Orchard Lake Schools, formerly Michigan Military Academy.

== Geography ==
According to the United States Census Bureau, the city has a total area of 4.12 square miles (10.67 km^{2}), of which 2.44 square miles (6.32 km^{2}) is land and 1.68 square miles (4.35 km^{2}) (40.78%) is water.

Orchard Lake, Cass Lake, and Upper Straits Lake are all within or partially within the city limits. Terrain is rolling and high. Orchard Lake Village surrounds Orchard Lake, the third-largest lake in Oakland County (after Cass Lake, which is also partially in Orchard Lake Village, and Kent Lake). The city is surrounded by West Bloomfield Township, except for the northeast boundary along Keego Harbor.

== Government ==
=== Federal, state, and county legislators ===
United States House of Representatives
District	Representative	Party	Since
11th	Haley Stevens	Democratic	2019

Michigan Senate
District	Senator	Party	Since
13th	Rosemary Bayer	Democratic	2023

Michigan House of Representatives
District	Representative	Party	Since
20th	Noah Arbit	Democratic	2023

Oakland County Board of Commissioners
District	Commissioner	Party	Since
11	Marcia Gershenson	Democratic	2005

== Demographics ==
Historical population
Census	Pop.	Note	%±
1930	178		—
1940	295		65.7%
1950	696		135.9%
1960	1,127		61.9%
1970	1,487		31.9%
1980	1,798		20.9%
1990	2,286		27.1%
2000	2,215		−3.1%
2010	2,375		7.2%
2020	2,238		−5.8%
U.S. Decennial Census

=== 2020 census ===
As of the 2020 census, Orchard Lake Village had a population of 2,238. The median age was 52.4 years. 16.3% of residents were under the age of 18 and 26.0% of residents were 65 years of age or older. For every 100 females there were 102.5 males, and for every 100 females age 18 and over there were 101.3 males age 18 and over.

100.0% of residents lived in urban areas, while 0.0% lived in rural areas.

There were 808 households in Orchard Lake Village, of which 27.5% had children under the age of 18 living in them. Of all households, 71.9% were married-couple households, 11.8% were households with a male householder and no spouse or partner present, and 13.6% were households with a female householder and no spouse or partner present. About 15.9% of all households were made up of individuals and 9.7% had someone living alone who was 65 years of age or older.

There were 877 housing units, of which 7.9% were vacant. The homeowner vacancy rate was 1.5% and the rental vacancy rate was 5.4%.

Racial composition as of the 2020 census
Race	Number	Percent
White	1,791	80.0%
Black or African American	127	5.7%
American Indian and Alaska Native	3	0.1%
Asian	179	8.0%
Native Hawaiian and Other Pacific Islander	1	0.0%
Some other race	14	0.6%
Two or more races	123	5.5%
Hispanic or Latino (of any race)	46	2.1%

=== 2010 census ===
As of the census of 2010, there were 2,375 people, 802 households, and 665 families living in the city. The population density was 973.4 inhabitants per square mile (375.8/km^{2}). There were 869 housing units at an average density of 356.1 per square mile (137.5/km^{2}). The racial makeup of the city was 83.9% White, 6.4% African American, 7.4% Asian, 0.2% from other races, and 2.1% from two or more races. Hispanic or Latino of any race were 1.1% of the population.

There were 802 households, of which 33.9% had children under the age of 18 living with them, 75.7% were married couples living together, 4.1% had a female householder with no husband present, 3.1% had a male householder with no wife present, and 17.1% were non-families. 14.5% of all households were made up of individuals, and 6.8% had someone living alone who was 65 years of age or older. The average household size was 2.78 and the average family size was 3.08.

The median age in the city was 46.9 years. 23.2% of residents were under the age of 18; 7.5% were between the ages of 18 and 24; 16.1% were from 25 to 44; 35.7% were from 45 to 64; and 17.5% were 65 years of age or older. The gender makeup of the city was 53.6% male and 46.4% female.

=== 2000 census ===
As of the census of 2000, there were 2,215 people, 750 households, and 648 families living in the city. The population density was 855.7 inhabitants per square mile (330.4/km^{2}). There were 805 housing units at an average density of 311.0 per square mile (120.1/km^{2}). The racial makeup of the city was 91.87% White, 3.84% African American, 0.14% Native American, 2.66% Asian, 0.09% from other races, and 1.40% from two or more races. Hispanic or Latino of any race were 0.90% of the population.

8.8% of Orchard Lake's population reported ancestries that were characterized as "Assyrian/Chaldean/Syriac" by the U.S. Census, making Orchard Lake Village the community with the highest percentage of people in that category of any place in the United States.

There were 750 households, out of which 40.3% had children under the age of 18 living with them, 79.7% were married couples living together, 3.9% had a female householder with no husband present, and 13.5% were non-families. 9.6% of all households were made up of individuals, and 2.8% had someone living alone who was 65 years of age or older. The average household size was 2.95 and the average family size was 3.18.

In the city, the population was spread out, with 26.9% under the age of 18, 6.0% from 18 to 24, 21.7% from 25 to 44, 34.4% from 45 to 64, and 11.0% who were 65 years of age or older. The median age was 43 years. For every 100 females, there were 104.3 males. For every 100 females age 18 and over, there were 107.4 males.

The median income for a household in the city was $121,126, and the median income for a family was $126,058. Males had a median income of $83,680 versus $41,250 for females. The per capita income for the city was $67,881. About 0.6% of families and 0.5% of the population were below the poverty line, including none of those under the age of eighteen or sixty-five or over.

== Education ==
Almost all of Orchard Lake Village is within the West Bloomfield School District.

One portion is instead in Walled Lake Consolidated Schools.

Also, there is another school called St. Mary's Preparatory, which is a Catholic Preparatory for boys.

== Notable people ==
- J. Sumner Rogers, founder of Michigan Military Academy
- Bob Seger, American rock musician
