= Old Burying Ground =

Old Burying Ground may refer to:

in Canada

- Old Burying Ground (Halifax, Nova Scotia)

in the United States

(by state)

- Old Burying Ground (Brookline, Massachusetts)
- Old Burying Ground (Cambridge, Massachusetts)
- Old Burying Ground, Duxbury, Massachusetts
- Old Burying Ground (Littleton, Massachusetts), listed on the NRHP in Massachusetts
- Old Burying Ground (Stoneham, Massachusetts), listed on the NRHP in Massachusetts
- Old Scots Burying Ground, Marlboro, New Jersey listed on the NRHP in New Jersey
- Old Burying Ground (Beaufort, North Carolina), listed on the NRHP in North Carolina
- Old Colony Burying Ground, Granville, OH, listed on the NRHP in Ohio
