= Collier High School =

Collier High School may refer to:

- Barron G. Collier High School, Florida
- Collier High School (New Jersey)
