= Old Scots Burying Ground =

Historic site in Monmouth County, New Jersey

- U.S. National Register of Historic Places
- New Jersey Register of Historic Places
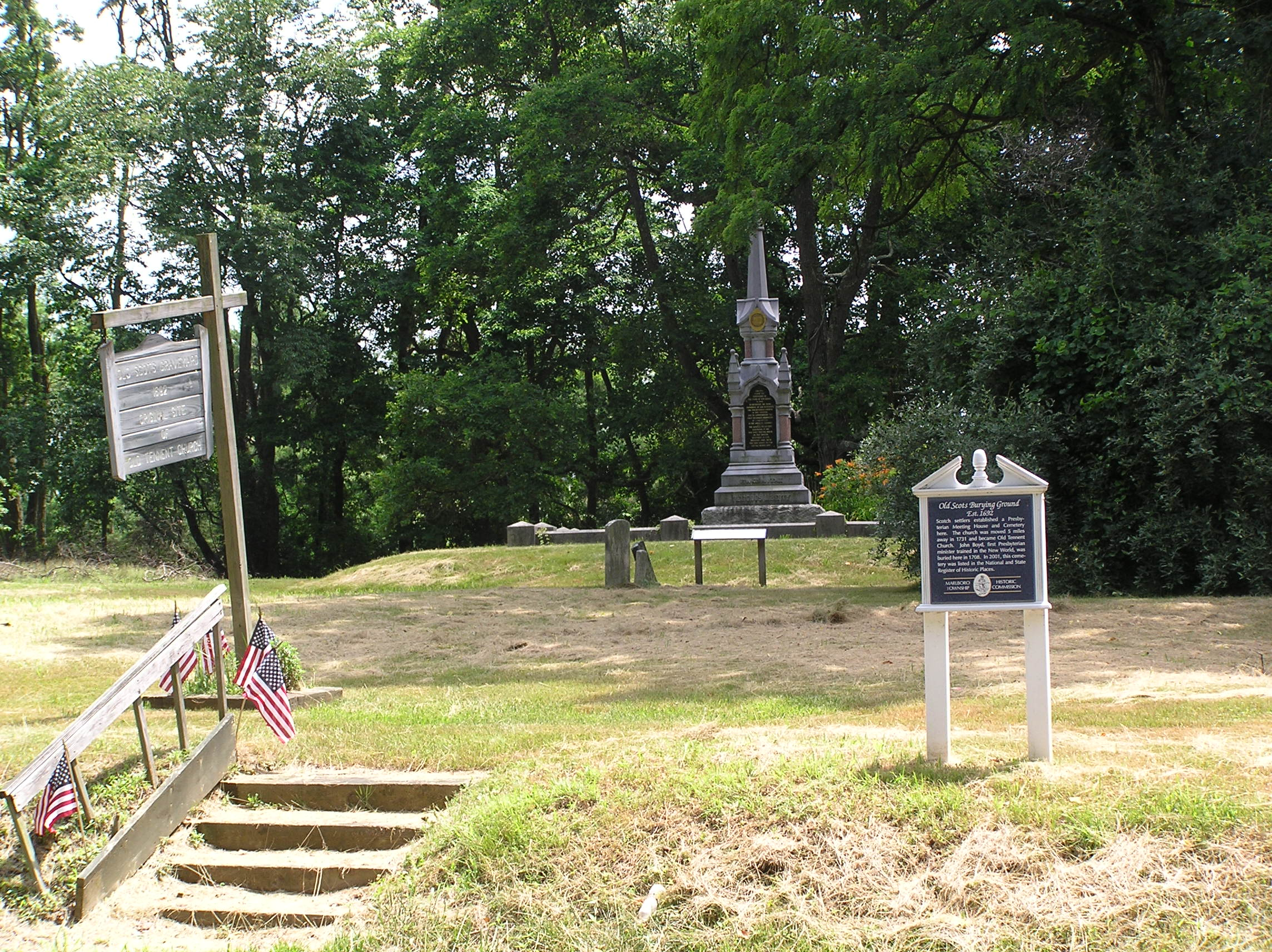

- Location within Monmouth County, New Jersey Location within New Jersey Location within the United States
- Location: Gordon's Corner Road, Marlboro Township, New Jersey
- Coordinates: 40°20′23″N 74°15′35″W
- Area: 1 acre (0.40 ha)
- Built: 1692
- Architect: J & R Lamb Studio
- NRHP reference No.: 01000841
- NJRHP No.: 3777

Significant dates
- Added to NRHP: August 15, 2001
- Designated NJRHP: June 19, 2001

The Old Scots Burying Ground is a historic cemetery located on Gordon's Corner Road in the Wickatunk section of Marlboro Township, in Monmouth County, New Jersey. It was added to the National Register of Historic Places on August 15, 2001, for its significance in history and religion. The Old Scots Burying Ground is about an acre in size, about 195 feet above sea level and dates back to 1685. The total number of burials at the cemetery is not precisely known, suggested by Symms, "There are a large number of graves in Old Scots yard without any inscribed stones". Some reports place the number as at least 100 known graves with most headstones of brown sandstone. However, more recent research using ground penetrating radar reported by the Old Tennent Church in 2001 has put the number of confirmed sites at about 122 graves with a possible 140 more unmarked; placing the number at about 262 total graves in the cemetery. In 1945, in an attempt to clean out the site of vegetation and over-growth, a bulldozer was used on the property and as a result some headstones were dislodged and broken stones removed. The defining structure in the cemetery is a tall monument to Rev. John Boyd, created by the J&R Lamb Company. Built to commemorate the first recorded Presbyterian ordination of Rev. John Boyd. The monument is currently owned by the Synod of the Northeast who holds the property deed but it is maintained by the Old Tennent Church. The last identified burial was in 1977.

== Structure on site ==
=== Oldest Presbyterian Church ===
Defined in the beginning by the church that the Presbyterians built; the oldest Presbyterian church, starting with a crude structure of logs in 1692. The location was known as "Free Hill" or "the upper meeting house" and was the site of the first recorded Presbytery session. By 1705 a refined church was constructed and a notation in the court record of the location as a "publick meeting house". With Rev. John Boyd as Minister, by 1730 the congregation had grown and the church was removed to Freehold Township. Adjacent to the church was the Old Scots Burying Ground.

=== Original description ===
In September 1710, the General Presbytery of Philadelphia wrote a letter to the Presbytery of Dublin Ireland. In the letter they identified the congregation and location of the Old Scots Church. They stated "We have in Jersey only two congregations... one of the two was near freehold, in the province of East Jersey"

=== The Boyd Monument ===
In the center of the cemetery is a tall monument of Scottish and Vermont granite and Irish Graystone, surrounded by Scottish thistle carved in the granite. These stones were selected since the men who made up the original Presbytery were from Scotland, Ireland and New England. The monument stands twenty-five feet high, including a 5-foot (1.5 m) spire which was lost in the 1950s. The total cost of the monument was $1300. A fund containing an additional $1000 was raised for the preservation of the monument and care of the grounds. The monument was created in 1899 by the J&R Lamb Company, after submitting the winning design to the Synod committee. The monument was refurbished in 2002 and the spire was replaced.

The monument was erected in memory of Rev. John Boyd, the first pastor of the church. In 1915, The Presbyterian Synod added John Tennent's name to the monument. A man made mound-like elevation measuring approximately thirty-feet square and 3.5 feet high, supports a late-nineteenth-century monument situated in the approximate center of the site. The base of the monument states "To the untiring effort of Rev. Allen Henry Brown, which led to the erection of this monument this tablet is set as a memorial by the Synod of New Jersey". On another side of the monument written at the base is "Elder Walter Ker" and under his name is "Acts VIII 4" (Meaning: "Those who had been scattered preached the word wherever they went.")

On one side of the monument there is an inscription: "Erected under the supervision of the Synod of New Jersey in 1899 to recognize the good providence of God in planting the Presbyterian church in this county and to commemorate the first recorded ordination by a Presbytery in the American colonies. The general Presbytery assembling in the Old Scots meeting house on this ground December 1706, ordained John Boyd, who died August 30th 1708 and was buried here." Another side of the monument has a brass plack saying "Continuing in the tradition of John Boyd, The United Presbyterian Church in the USA was formed by merger in 1958, and the Presbyterian church (USA) was formed by merger in 1983. This reaffirmation of our reformed tradition made by the Synod of the Northeast in 2002." This was placed on the monument after the 2002 restoration.

Additionally, the following seals were on the gables of the monument:

- The seal of the Presbyterian Church of Monmouth County
- The seal of the Presbyterian Church of the United States of America
- The seal of the Presbyterian Church of Scotland
- The seal of the Scotch Irish Society

The Monument was to be originally unveiled on October 18, 1899, it was however delayed in shipping and did not arrive on time for that scheduled event forcing the event to be delayed to the spring. The monument was actually unveiled on June 14, 1900 at 11 am.

=== Stairs ===
In 1945, stairs with handrails were added to the site to help ascend to the property from the street.

=== Signs ===
There are three signs on the property:

- The Old Tennent Church added a sign to the property at the street which reads: "Old Scots Graveyard 1692 | Original Site of Old Tennent Church."
- Unknown origin of the sign that reads: "OLD SCOTS MEETING HOUSE: Old Scots Meeting House was built in the year 1692 by Scottish Presbyterians (Calvinists) on this ground known as 'Free Hill.' This sight (sic) was the location of the first recorded Presbytery meeting and the sight (sic) of the first ordination of a Presbyterian minister in North America in the year 1706. Now these Scottish exiles could worship freely in their own fashion. The granite border around the central monument marks the dimension of the small log structure that was the boundary of the Old Scots Meeting House. In 1731, the congregation moved to its present location in Tennent called Old Tennent Church."
- Marlboro Township Historic Commission added a sign to the site that reads: "Scottish settlers established a Presbyterian meeting house and cemetery on this site in 1692. John Boyd, the first Presbyterian minister trained in the New World and the first pastor of the church, was buried here in 1708. The church was moved five miles away in 1731 and became Old Tennent Church. In 2001, this cemetery was listed in the National and State Registers of Historic Places."

== Vandalism ==
There was an episode of reported vandalism on March 25, 1994. At that time there were several smashed tombstones and some tombstones were removed from the mounts.

== Restoration ==
The first recorded interest in restoration of the site was in 1883 when Gideon C. McDowell (A local farmer and member of the State Potato Association) encountered the site and was specifically interested in the gravestone of Rev. Boyd. When McDowell first encountered the stone it was "in a neglected state and covered with lichens". He cleaned the stone at that time of the lichens. There have been a number of additional site restorations over the years:

- In 1898, The site was restored and overgrowth was removed. The cemetery was prepared for 600 people to visit and have a pilgrimage.
- In 1931, the site was again cleared out of overgrowth and groomed for a pending pilgrimage.
- In 1945, The site was again overgrown. At that time, the site surface was scraped with a bulldozer to remove overgrowth and vegetation. Some damage to the cemetery was done at that time including dislodging gravestones and removing partial fallen stones from some of the grave sites.
- In 2000, vegetation and growth was removed from the cemetery to accomplish scientific testing.
- In 2002, attention was again given to the cemetery. Specifically, the central monument was the focus of the restoration. The budget for the Old Scots Burying Ground was $13,000 for the restoration. The funds were supplied by the Monmouth Count Historic Commission, Old Tennent Cemetery and the Presbyterian Synod of the Northeast. Most of the funds were used to replace a five foot spire, lost in the 1950s. It was recreated and put back on the Boyd Monument. Records suggest it was removed for cleaning in the 1950s, but never put back on due to the company going bankrupt in the process and the original spire was lost. A re-dedication of the monument was conducted by Charles Vasbinder on October 17, 2002. There were almost 60 people in attendance.

== Archaeological site surveys ==
The first site survey was done in December 2000, a site survey was conducted using electronic metal detecting equipment. The survey uncovered 15 artifacts, of note are 2 matching coffin handles from the 19th century and one ornate coffin handle with the embossment, "Our Darling," was recovered near the Reid family gravemarker. This marker represents three burials: James Reid (1828-1904), Hannah Reid (1829-1899) and Emma Reid (1852-1869). It is possible that this handle became dislodged from one of the Reid coffins, perhaps the one belonging to Emma Reid, who predeceased both of her parents.

The second archaeological investigations to be conducted at the cemetery was in 2001. Two passes with ground penetrating radar (GPR) were done on the cemetery site. On February 2 and again on February 17, 2001 a number of passes were done. At that time, the GPR identified 137 possible burial sites. The GPR survey also identified two areas where the original meeting house may have been located. One area is adjacent east of the monument mound and the other is adjacent west of the monument mound.

As part of the 2001 survey, a total of 11 shovel tests were performed east of the monument mound. They found Twenty-two artifacts including window glass, nails and a clay pipe stem fragment. Testing in an area west of the monument mound, uncovered the remains of an intact dry-laid foundation wall approximately two-feet wide. Artifacts recovered include several fragments of shell-tempered mortar, a hand-tooled bottle finish, and a quartzite fire-cracked-rock (FCR) fragment.

Old Scots Burying Ground is considered a State archaeological site and on January 22, 2001; was issued number 28-Mo-294 by the New Jersey State Museum. It has been determined that in addition to the use of the property as a church and cemetery, it is possible that American Indian groups my have utilized this site as well.

== Boundary description ==
(4) South 12 degrees 57 minutes West, along the westerly outline of said burying ground 211 9/10 feet to a cedar stake at the most westerly corner of the burying ground; thence (5) South 81 degrees 03 minutes East 208 93/100 feet to an iron pipe set in the most southerly corner of said burying ground; thence (6) North 16 degrees 57 minutes East along the easterly outline of said Scotch Burying Ground 208 31/100 feet to a bolt set in the center of the gravel road leading to Englishtown, known as Gordon's Corner Road.

== Removed headstones ==
- Rev. John Boyd - The headstone was removed to the Philadelphia Presbytery for preservation. It is a table stone five feet in length, originally laid horizontally on a bed of stone and lime. When removed it was encased in a wooden frame made from locust trees grown at Old Scots, and displayed at the Library of the Presbyterian Historical Society.

== Pilgrimages To Old Scots ==
- On June 4, 1895, seven hundred pilgrims of the Presbyterian Synod came to the burial ground to commemorate Rev. John Boyd's life and the start of church at that location. They came to the grave location of the first Pastor of the church (Rev. John Boyd) at Old Scots Cemetery. It was during this pilgrimage that the request for a monument to Boyd was made. Rev. Allen Brown was appointed by the Synod to raise the money required for the erection of the monument. The initial request was to build a "stone camopy over the crumbling tombstone", but the monument seemed to be more practical.
- On April 12, 1931, Heads of the church and Presbyterians from "all over the East" participated in a pilgrimage. This was to celebrate the 225th anniversary of the ordination of Rev. John Boyd.
- On July 6, 1942, a pilgrimage to Old Scots Burying Ground was made by the members of the Old Tennent Church for an address by Rev. George Horn and Rev. Hutchinson.

== List of people known to be buried ==
List of People
Last Name	First Name	Age at Death	Date of death	Inscription / Additional Detail	Reference
Craig	Archibald	73	March 6, 1751	He was called Captain Craig	
Henderson	John	74	January 1, 1771	He was the first president of the board of trustees at Old Tennent Church ||	
Craig	Mary	69	November 1, 1752		
Boyd	Rev. John	26	August 30, 1708	First Pastor of Old Scots Church - Original Tombstone removed to the Presbyterian Historical Society in Philadelphia	
Forman	Jonathan	74	December 28, 1762	Was a judge of the court of common pleas for Monmouth County - son of Samuel Forman and Mary Wilbore.	
Redford	Margaret	72	December 21, 1765		
Redford	William	84	1726		
Van Dorn	Elinor	20	May 22, 1733	"Here Lies Interr'd the body of Elinor, Wife of Abraham Van Dorn and Daughter of Jonathan and Margaret Forman, Who departed this life my the 22 Day Annoq. Domini 1733 Aged twenty years and five months"	
Tennent	John Rev.	23	April 23, 1732	Pastor of Tennent Church *(See below)	
Probasco	Abraham	69	November 30, 1806	Husband of Nellie	
Probasco	Nellie	69	September 9, 1806	Wife of Abraham	
Probasco	Margaret	77	June 27, 1844	Daughter of Abraham & Nellie	
Clark	Richard	70	May 16, 1733	Born in Scotland February 10, 1663	
Probasco	Sarah	63	August 4, 1828	Daughter of Abraham & Nellie	
Henderson	Michael		August 23, 1722		
Wyckoff	Margaret	72	December 21, 1765		
Conover	Ira			Son of Garret I. Conover and Sarah Schenck	
Snyder	Mary			Nee Quackenbush - Wife of Hendrick	
Snyder	Hendrick				
Watson	Richard				
Henderson	Jane	19	1722	"The first Child ever the Revd. Mr. John Tennent Baptized." - Daughter of John	
Hanah	Amy		Wife of John Hanah		
Boice	John				
Boice	Jane				
Quackenbush	Jacob			Son of William	
Quackenbush	Experience				
Reid	James	80	1904		
Reid	Hannah	70	1899		
Reid	Emma	17	1869		

- * Rev. John Tennent Inscription : "Here Lyes what was mortal of | The Rev'd Mr. John Tennent | Nat. Nov 12, 1707, Obijt April 23, 1732 | Who quick grew old in Learning, Vertue, Grace, | Quick finished well yielded to Death's Embrace | 'Whose molded dust this cabinet contains | Whose soul triumphant with bright scraphim reigns, | Waiting the time till Heaven's bright Concave flame | and ye last trump repairs this ruined frame | [Unreadable] morienque queramurae verbam | Mers matura vinit cumbona Vita fuit" - composed by the Rev. Dr. Jonathan Dickinson - Pastor of First Presbyterian Church Elizabeth 1708 - 1747.

== See also ==
- National Register of Historic Places listings in Monmouth County, New Jersey
