= Robert Collier (author) =

American spiritualist

Leo Robert Collier (b. April 19, 1885, in St. Louis, Missouri; d. 1950) was an American author of self-help and New Thought metaphysical books in the 20th century. He was the nephew of Peter Fenelon Collier, founder of Collier's Weekly, and cousin of Robert J. Collier, its editor. He was involved in writing, editing, and research for most of his life. His book The Secret of the Ages (1926) sold over 300,000 copies during his life.

Collier wrote about the practical psychology of abundance, desire, faith, visualization, confident action, and personal development. His metaphysical and new thought books focused on positive thinking, the mind's power and achieving personal success.

Robert Collier Publications, Inc. still exists through the efforts of his widow, and now his children, grandchildren, and great-grandchildren. Collier's books, which have been popular with self-help and New Thought groups, have been brought back to prominence from being referenced in the popular metaphysical movie The Secret. In the book The Secret, Rhonda Byrne writes: "The glimpse came in a hundred-year-old book, given to me by my daughter Hayley".

== Mind, Inc. ==
Starting in May 1929, Collier's organization published a monthly magazine called Mind, Inc. The magazine was initially about half fiction, with much of the material religious in nature. By 1932 almost all the fiction had disappeared. The title changed to Mind Magazine with the May 1932. It continued to appear until at least 1939.

== The Robert Collier Letter Book ==
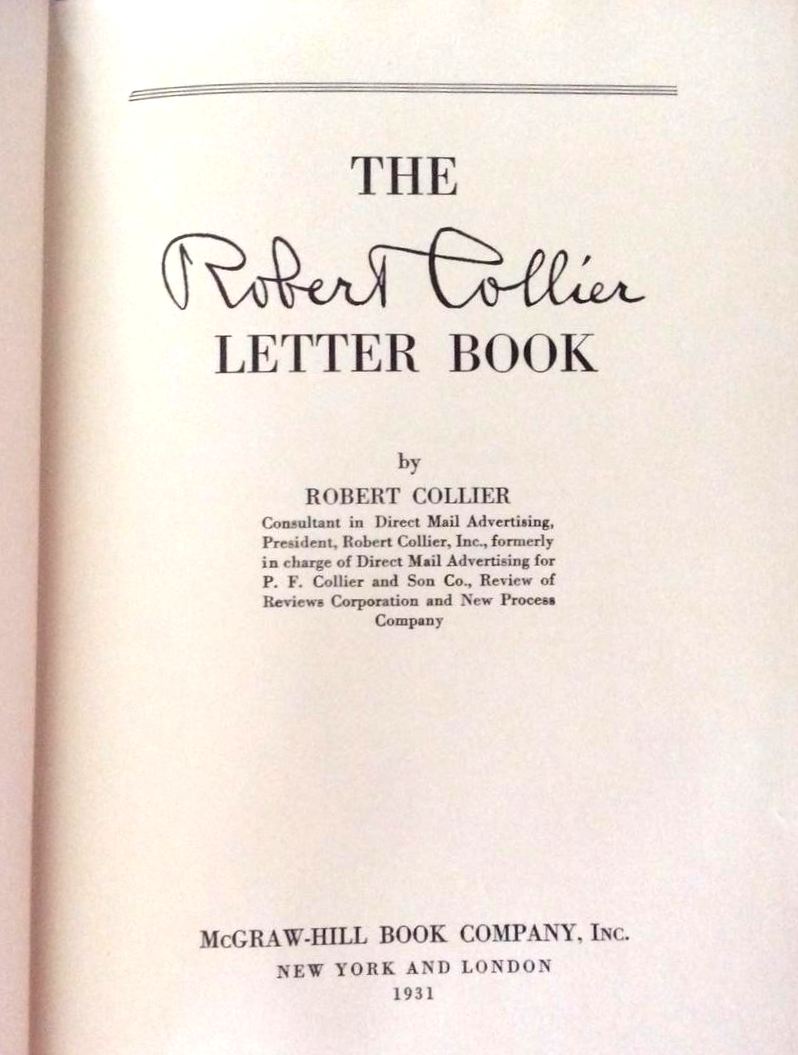
The first page of the first edition of the Robert Collier Letter Book, published by the McGraw-Hill Book Company in 1931.

The Robert Collier Letter Book is a collection of letters and copywriting techniques written by self-help author and publisher Robert Collier in the early 20th century. The book is considered a classic in the field of direct-response marketing and copywriting, and is still used as a reference by many modern marketers and copywriters.

Robert Collier began his career in advertising, working as a copywriter for several companies before eventually starting his own advertising agency. He became known for his successful direct-response advertising campaigns, which often used persuasive letter-writing techniques.

The Robert Collier Letter Book, first published in 1931 by the McGraw-Hill Book Company, is a compilation of some of Collier's most effective letters and copywriting techniques. The book includes letters for a variety of purposes, such as sales letters, fundraising letters, and letters to build relationships with customers. Collier's writing style is conversational and persuasive, and he emphasizes the importance of understanding the reader's needs and desires to effectively communicate with them.

== Influence ==
Collier was a major influence on further New Thought and esoteric writers such as Rhonda Byrne who wrote The Secret, and Father Divine of the International Peace Mission movement.

== Selected books written by Collier ==
- Copywriting & Direct Marketing
- The Robert Collier Letter Book (1931)
- How To Make Money at Home in Spare Time By Mail
- The God in You
- The Magic Word
- The Secret of the Ages (1926)
- The Secret Power
- Riches Within Your Reach: The Law of the Higher Potential
- Be Rich! The Science of Getting What You Want
- The Book of Life (Volumes 1–7) 1925

== Sources ==
- Ashley, Mike; Thiessen, Grant (1985). "Mind, Inc.". In Tymn, Marshall B.; Ashley, Mike (eds.). Science Fiction, Fantasy and Weird Fiction Magazines. Westport, Connecticut: Greenwood Press. pp. 407–409. ISBN 978-0-313-21221-5.
