= Peter Fenelon Collier =

Irish-American publisher (1849–1909)

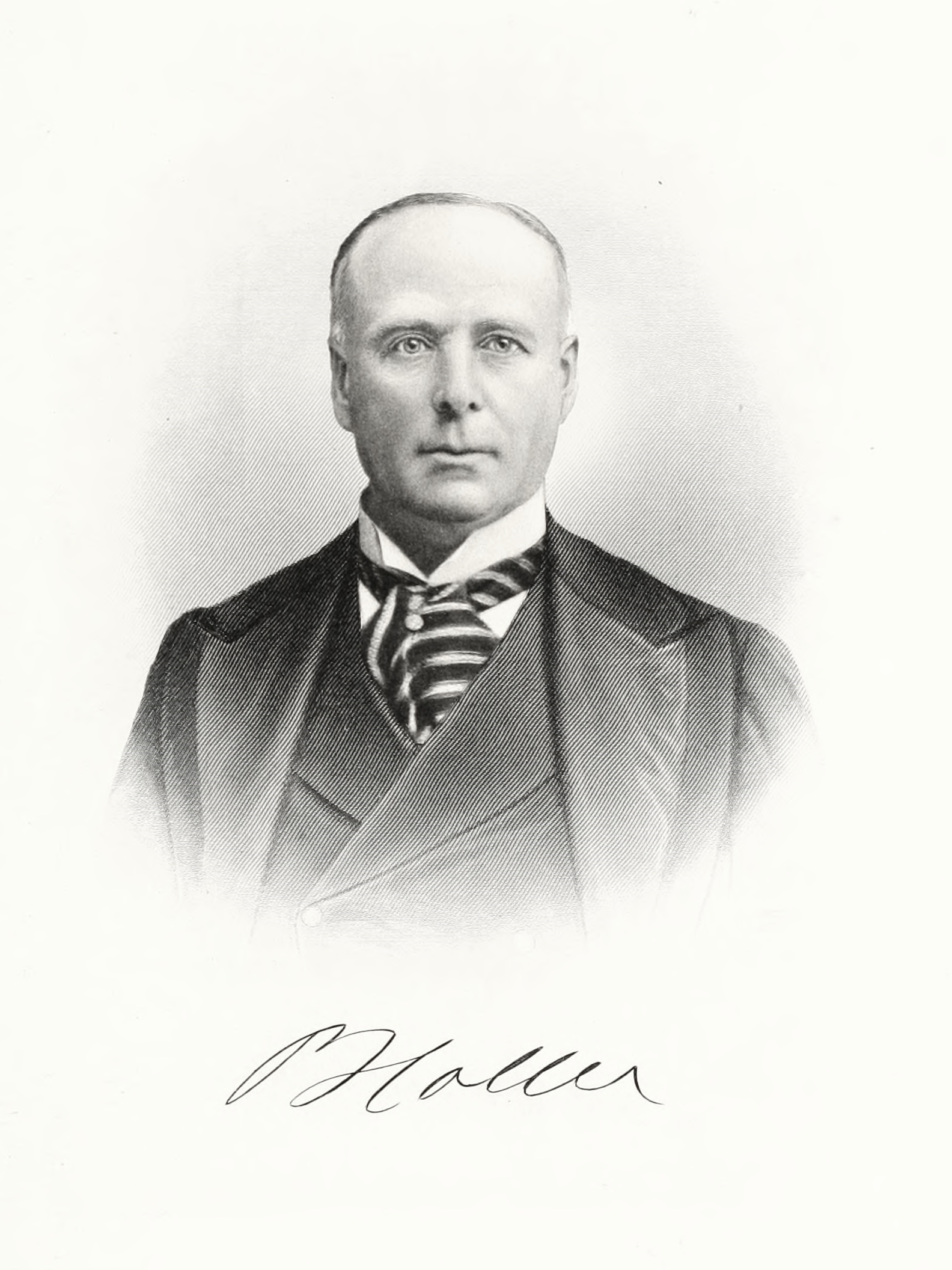
- Born: December 12, 1849; Myshall, Ireland
- Died: April 23, 1909 (aged 59); New York City, New York, U.S.
- Resting place: Collier High School (Wickatunk, New Jersey, U.S.)
- Occupation: Publisher
- Spouse: Catherine Dunne (m. 1873)
- Children: 1 son

Peter Fenelon Collier (December 12, 1849 – April 23, 1909) was an Irish-American publisher, the founder of the publishing company P. F. Collier & Son. He founded Collier's in 1888.

== Early life ==
Collier was born in Myshall, County Carlow, Ireland, on December 12, 1849, to Robert Collier and Catherine Fenelon. He emigrated to Dayton, Ohio, in the United States, in 1866 when he was 17-years old. He attended St. Mary's Seminary in Cincinnati for four years. He then worked for Sadler and Company, a publisher of school books. With $300 that he saved as a salesman, he bought the printing plates to Father Burke's Lectures. In a single year, his sales were $90,000. In July 1873, he married Catherine Dunne.

In 1874, he published a biography of Pius IX and later published Chandler's Encyclopedia and Chamber's Encyclopedia. He then began publishing "Collier's Library", a series of popular novels.

He later formed his own publishing company printing books for the Roman Catholic market. He founded Collier's Once a Week in April 1888. It was advertised as a magazine of "fiction, fact, sensation, wit, humor, news". By 1892, Collier's Once a Week had a circulation of over 250,000, and was one of the largest selling magazines in the United States. In 1895, the name was changed to Collier's Weekly: An Illustrated Journal, shortened in 1905 to Collier's: The National Weekly and eventually to simply Collier's.

== Death ==
Collier died of a stroke while at his riding club on the morning of April 23, 1909 in Manhattan.

His will left most of his estate to his wife and son. His estate included shares in the Rumson Polo Club, Monmouth Agricultural Fair Association, co-ownership of Collier's, shares in the Meadow Yacht Club, shares in the Kentucky Horse Show Company, Tammany Publishing Company, and a life insurance policy. All his assets were liquidated and amounted to $2,890,440 (approximately $103,574,000 today). His wife received a life estate and an annuity of $33,044. His son received $2,280,410 and the rest was distributed to various organizations.

== Legacy ==
=== Publishing ===
His son, Robert Joseph Collier, took over as publisher of Collier's. When Norman Hapgood joined Harper's Weekly in 1912, Robert Collier became the new editor. Circulation continued to grow, and by 1917, circulation reached one million. Robert Collier (1885–1950), his nephew, founded Robert Collier Publications.In 1952 the company published Collier's Encyclopedia.

=== Collier Prize ===
The Collier Prize for State Government Accountability was created in 2019, established to honor Peter Fenelon Collier's vision and to encourage investigative and political reporting at the state level. Founded by Nathan S. Collier, founder of the Collier Companies, and a descendant of Robert Collier, and administered jointly by the White House Correspondents' Association and the University of Florida College of Journalism and Communications, the journalism prize was first awarded in 2020.

The inaugural prize was awarded to The Oregonian for Polluted by Money, a four-part series investigating campaign contributions. Honorable mentions were awarded for Copy, Paste, Legislate, published by the Center for Public Integrity and USA Today and "Beaten, then silenced", published in The Philadelphia Inquirer.

| Preceded by N/A | Editor of Collier's Weekly; 1888-1903 | Succeeded by Norman Hapgood |
