= Tennent, New Jersey =

Populated place in Monmouth County, New Jersey, US

- Unincorporated community
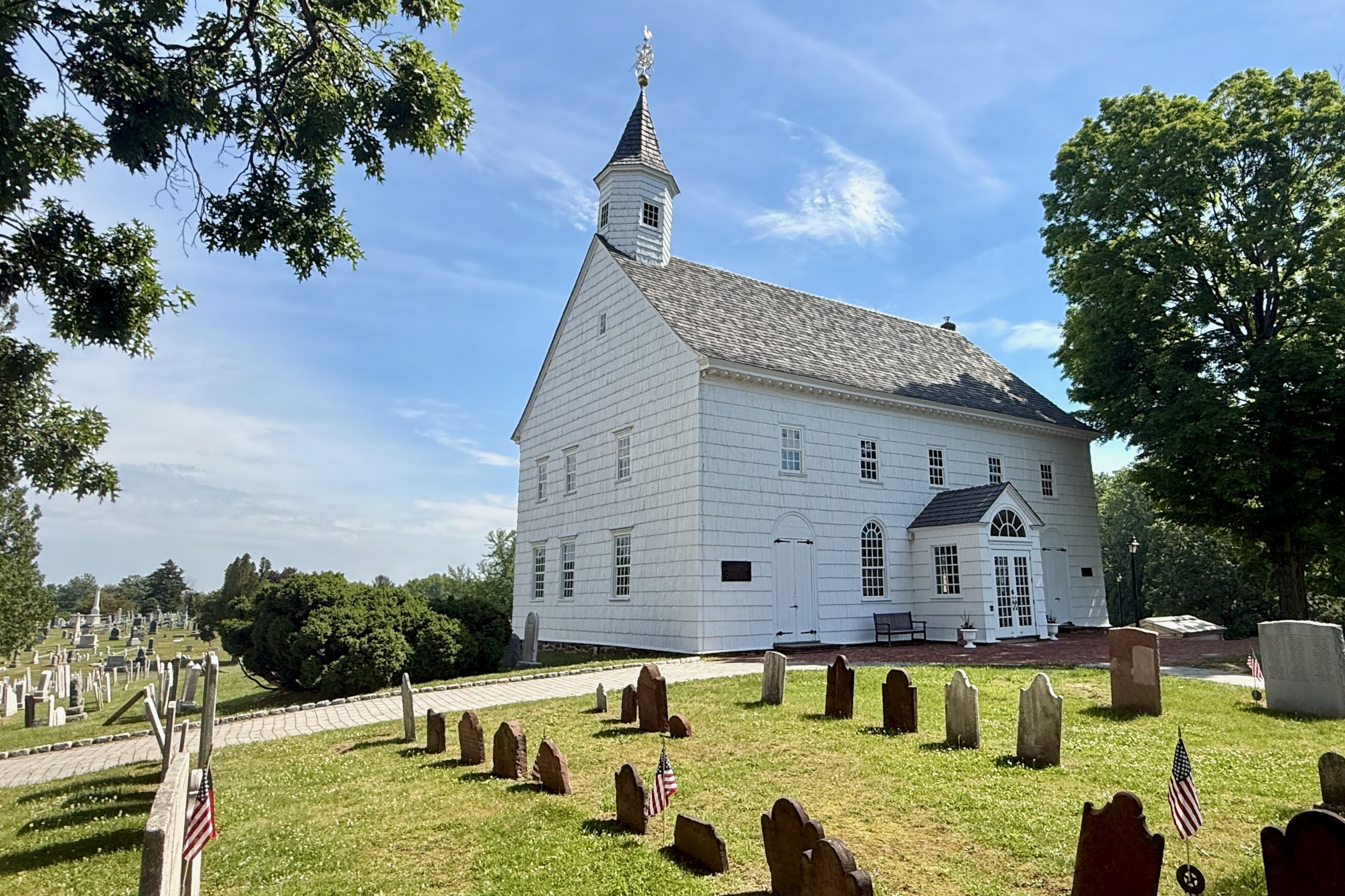
- Old Tennent Church and Cemetery in 2026

- Location of Tennent in Monmouth County Inset: Location of county within the state of New Jersey Tennent (New Jersey) Tennent (the United States)
- Coordinates: 40°16′46″N 74°20′04″W
- Country: United States
- State: New Jersey
- County: Monmouth
- Township: Manalapan
- Named for: William Tennent
- Elevation: 89 ft (27 m)
- Time zone: UTC-5 (Eastern (EST))
  - Summer (DST): UTC-4 (EDT)
- ZIP code: 07763
- Area codes: 732/848
- GNIS feature ID: 881132

Tennent is an unincorporated community located within Manalapan Township in Monmouth County, New Jersey, United States. Considered to be the historical center of Manalapan Township, Tennent is home to the Old Tennent Church and Old Tennent Cemetery. William Tennent (the church and area's namesake) served as pastor at the church for over 40 years. Tennent was also the center of a historic community of African Americans dating back to the early nineteenth century. The location of Tennent is located at the modern intersection of County Route 522 and Tennent Road (CR 3) and is near the limits of Monmouth Battlefield State Park.

== Notable people ==
People who were born in, residents of, or otherwise closely associated with Tennent include:

- Carl R. Woodward (1890–1974), educator and college administrator who served from 1951 to 1958 as the first president of the University of Rhode Island.
