= Robert J. Collier =

American publisher and aviation advocate (1876–1918)

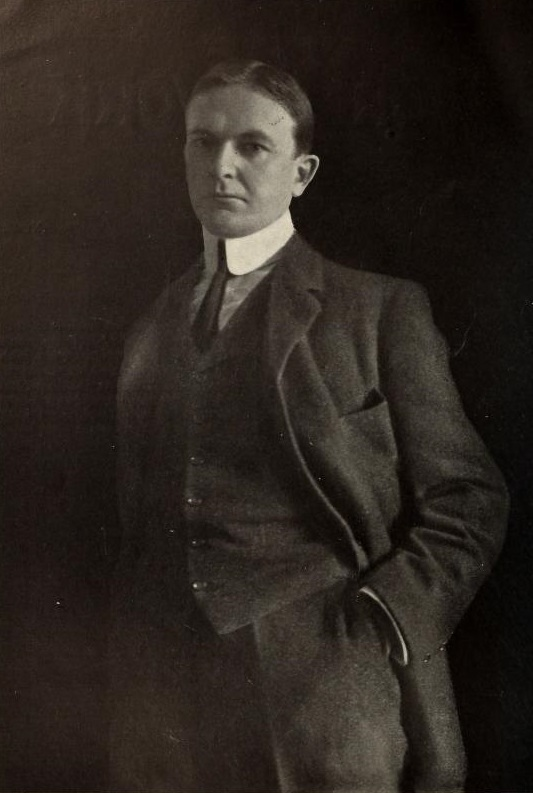
- Collier in 1908
- Born: Robert Joseph Collier; June 17, 1876; New York City, U.S.
- Died: November 9, 1918 (aged 42); New York City, U.S.
- Resting place: Collier High School, Wickatunk, New Jersey
- Education: Georgetown University; Harvard University; Oxford University
- Known for: Collier Trophy
- Spouse: Sara Steward Van Alen (1884–1963) (m. 1902)
- Children: 1
- Parent(s): Peter Fenelon Collier (1849–1909); Katherine Louise Dunue (1948–1918)
- Relatives: Robert Collier (cousin)

Robert Joseph Collier (June 17, 1876 – November 9, 1918) was an American publisher and early modern aviator. He was the heir to the publishing company P. F. Collier & Son, which was founded by his father, Peter Fenelon Collier. For a time, he was editor-in-chief of Collier's weekly magazine.

He was president of the Aero Club of America.

== Early life ==
Robert Joseph Collier was born on June 17, 1876 in New York City to Katherine Louise (née Dunue) and Peter Fenelon Collier. His father immigrated to the United States from Ireland and became a successful publisher of Catholic books and pamphlets before establishing Collier's, a weekly magazine, in 1888.

He received his early education at St. Francis College. In 1894, he graduated with an A.B. from Georgetown University, where he won the Merrick Medal from the Philodemic Society and composed the alma mater. He studied at Harvard University for one year and the University of Oxford for another year.

== Publishing ==
In 1898, Collier joined Collier's as an editor and publisher. Henry Reuterdahl later credited Collier with improving the artistic quality of the illustrations in the magazine, leading them to produce "the most brilliant artistic pages in the history of American weekly journalism."

Upon his father's death in 1909, he became president of the publishing house, which was reincorporated as P. F. Collier & Son. Although he was active in the editorial department, Collier did not become its nominal editor until 1912, when Norman Hapgood resigned over political differences. Hapgood favored Woodrow Wilson in that year's presidential election, while Collier preferred to endorse Theodore Roosevelt.

As the result of the forthright editorial stance Collier took, the magazine was frequently sued for libel. For example, an article on the history of American newspapers by William Irwin claiming, "a thousand dollars would buy indirectly an editorial by Arthur Brisbane," resulted in a $500,000 suit by William Randolph Hearst.

== Aviation pioneer ==
Collier was an aviation enthusiast and a friend of Orville Wright. He served as a director of the Wright Company.

In 1911, he purchased a Wright Model B aircraft and lent it to the United States Army as one of the first military planes in the world. Lieutenant Benjamin Foulois and civilian Wright Company pilot Phil Parmalee used the plane to scout the Mexico–United States border, but they crashed into the Rio Grande. After having the plane repaired, Collier used it to fly Jimmy Hare to film the construction of the Panama Canal.

He also commissioned a plane to flow over the Monmouth County fox hunt in 1911. Collier was known to fly to Freehold, dismount his biplane, and mount a polo pony to lead the fox hunt. In 1913, he commissioned a seaplane in an early attempt to cross the Atlantic.

In 1910, as president of the Aero Club of America, Collier commissioned Ernest Wise Keyser to make the 525-pound (238 kg) Aero Club of America Trophy. It was first awarded in 1911 to Glenn Curtiss for his work on a hydro-aeroplane. Today, it is known as the Collier Trophy.

== Personal life and death ==
As a young man, Collier was led a playboy lifestyle and had a number of relationships with prominent women, including showgirl Evelyn Nesbit. He was a political independent and a member of the Catholic Church. He was an enthusiastic polo player, which led to a broken collarbone in 1899 and a torn eye socket in 1906. He stopped playing in 1914, following a severe illness.

In addition to his membership in the Aero Club and National Aviation Association, Collier was a trustee of the Civic Forum and a member or associate of many civic organizations in New York City and New Jersey, including the American Association for the Advancement of Science, the American Irish Historical Society, the American Geographical Society, the American Museum of Natural History,the Metropolitan Musem of Art, the New York Academy of Science, the National Press Club, the Navy League, the New Jersey Historical Association, the United States Catholic Historical Society, and the Freehold YMCA. He was also a member of numerous social clubs in the United States, United Kingdom, and Paris.

Collier was credited for establishing the Lincoln Farm Association, which raised money to purchase Abraham Lincoln's birthplace in Kentucky, which was then donated and later turned into a National Park.

=== Marriage, estate, and family ===
Collier married Sarah Steward Van Alen (1881–1963) in Newport, Rhode Island in July 1902. Sara was a daughter of James J. Van Alen and her maternal grandparents were William Backhouse Astor Jr. and Caroline Schermerhorn Astor.

The couple maintained a Manhattan residence at 1067 Fifth Avenue. In 1901, Collier constructed Rest Hill, a summer country estate in Wickatunk, New Jersey, on property he bought from state assemblyman John D. Honce. The estate included a private landing strip, grass tennis courts, a croquet court, stables, and fox hunting hounds. Collier hosted a number of parties and celebrations on the estate, including the town's Decoration Day celebrations and the finish of the annual fox hunt. Today, the estate is Collier High School.

The couple had one son, Robert Jr., who was born prematurely and lived for only two days from April 22–24, 1903.

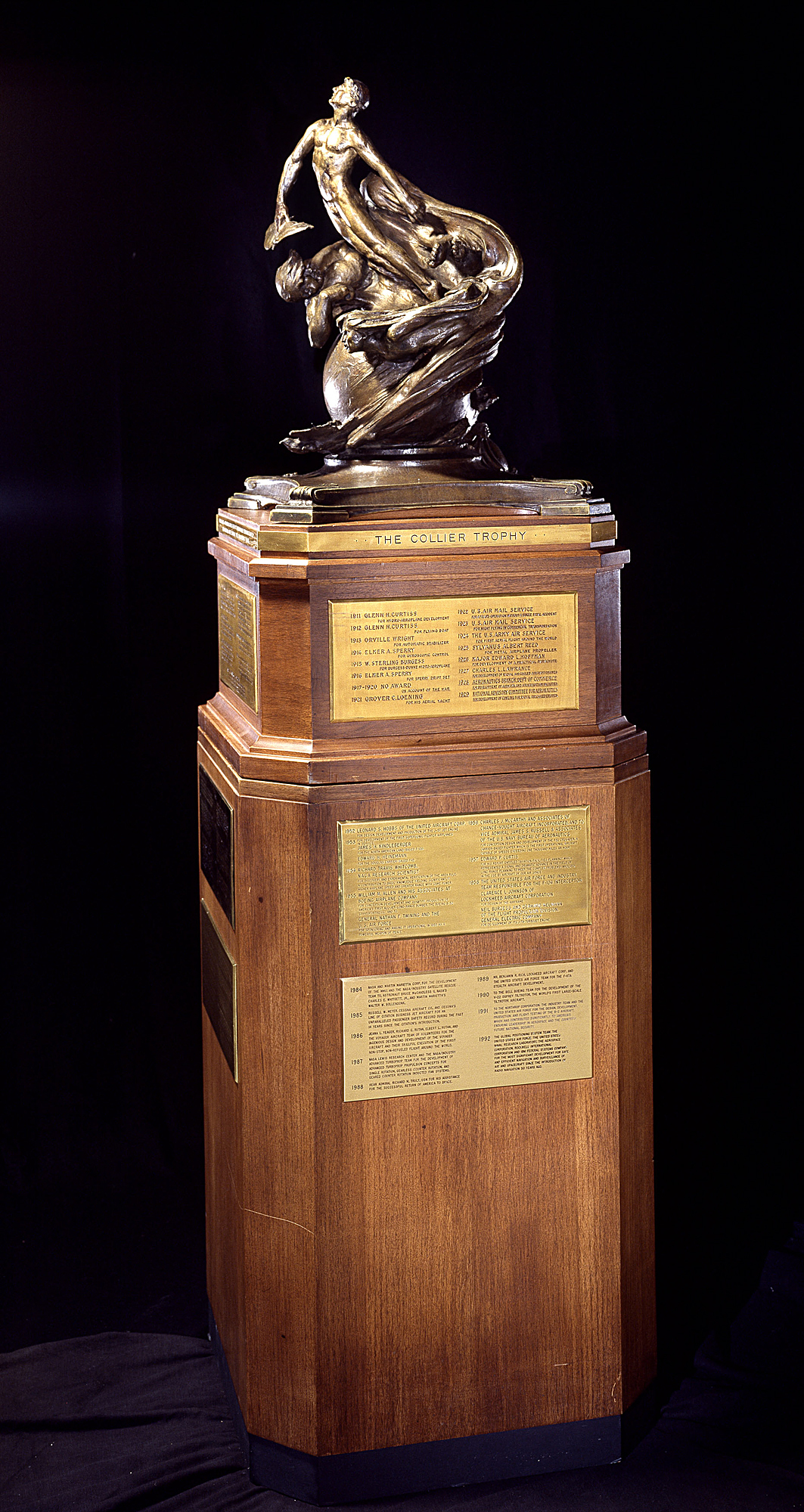
The Collier Trophy is awarded annually for American achievement in aeronautics or astronautics.

=== Death, burial, and last will ===
In August 1914, while at his summer home in Raquette Lake, New York, Collier became critically ill with uremic poisoning from kidney failure. He was rushed to New York City on a private train car while still unconscious.

He died of a heart attack at his dinner table on November 8, 1918, a few hours after arriving home from France, where he was reporting on World War I. However, shortly before his return to New York, General John J. Pershing had personally cancelled his press credentials and ordered him home.

His funeral was held in the Church of St. Jean Baptiste. His pallbearers included Orville Wright, Condé Nast, Francis Patrick Garvan, Finley Peter Dunne and Joseph P. Kennedy. In his will, he designated Dunne, Garvan, and Harry Payne Whitney as residuary legatees of his estate. Although the estate was initially valued at $5,000,000, the three men renounced the bequest in favor of his widow. However, it was effectively worthless. She sold the troubled publishing company and donated the Rest Hill estate to the Sisters of the Good Shepherd, who made it a home for troubled young women.

=== Legacy ===
In 1922, the Aero Club dissolved and the National Aeronautic Association (NAA) took ownership of the annual trophy Collier had instituted. It was unofficially renamed the Robert J. Collier Trophy, which became its official name in 1944. In 1984, he was inducted into the Aviation Hall of Fame of New Jersey.

During World War II, a Liberty ship was named for Collier. Following the war, it was lost when it ran aground in the Scheldt.

He was portrayed by Phillip Reed in The Girl in the Red Velvet Swing, a 1955 film about the life of Evelyn Nesbit.

Media offices
Preceded by Norman Hapgood	Collier's Weekly; 1912-1914	Succeeded by Norman Hapgood
