= Norman Hapgood =

American diplomat, editor, writer and journalist (1868–1937)

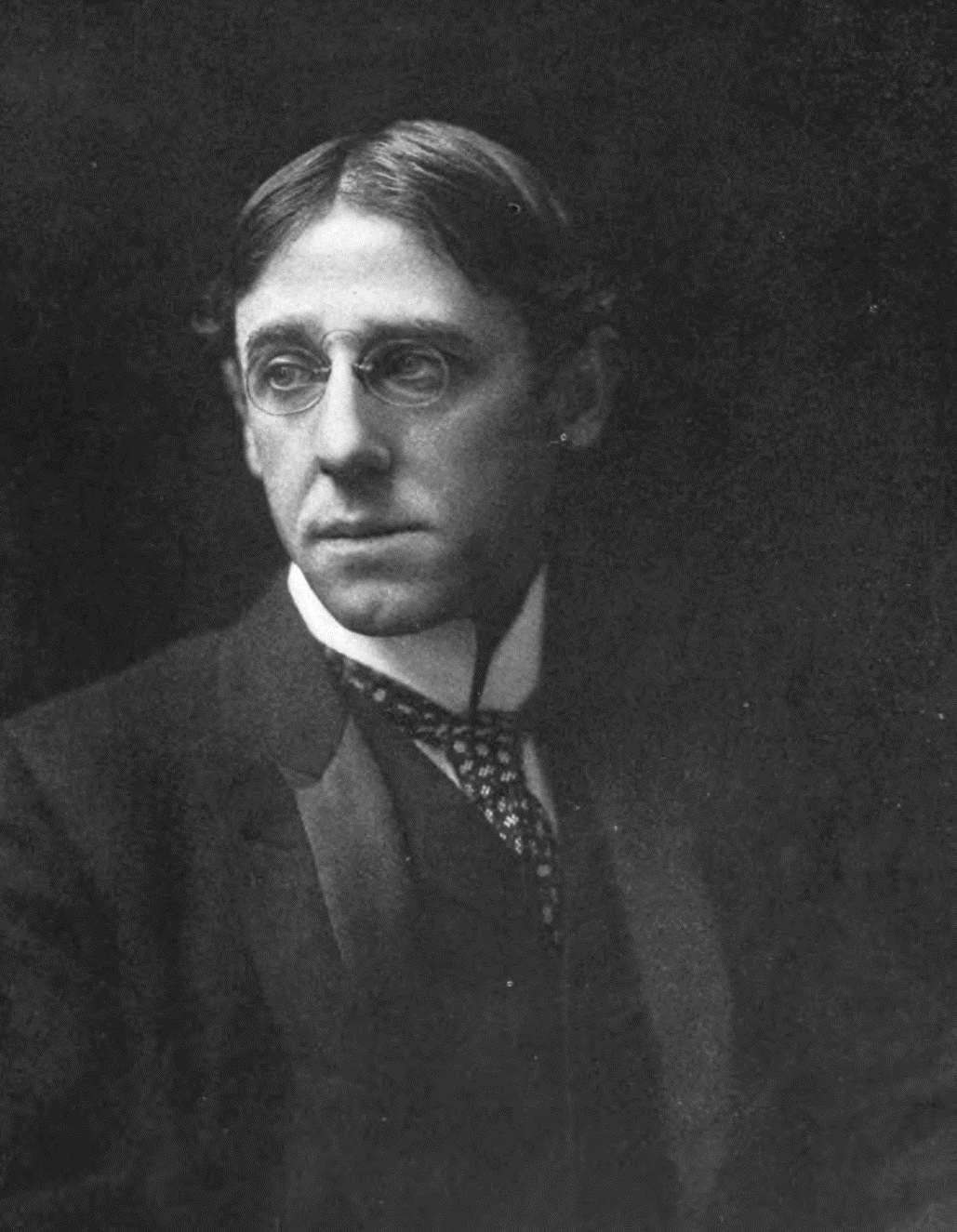

United States Minister to Denmark
- In office June 17, 1919 – December 9, 1919
- President: Woodrow Wilson
- Preceded by: Maurice Francis Egan
- Succeeded by: Joseph Grew

Personal details
- Born: March 28, 1868 Chicago, Illinois, U.S.
- Died: April 29, 1937 (aged 69) New York City
- Resting place: Green-Wood Cemetery, Brooklyn, New York, U.S.
- Spouse(s): Emilie Bigelow Hapgood; Elizabeth Kempley Reynolds
- Education: Harvard University
- Occupation: Diplomat; editor; writer; journalist
- Writing career
- Notable work: The Inside Story of Henry Ford's Jew-Mania

Norman Hapgood (March 28, 1868 – April 29, 1937) was an American writer, historian, journalist, editor, and critic, and an American Minister to Denmark.

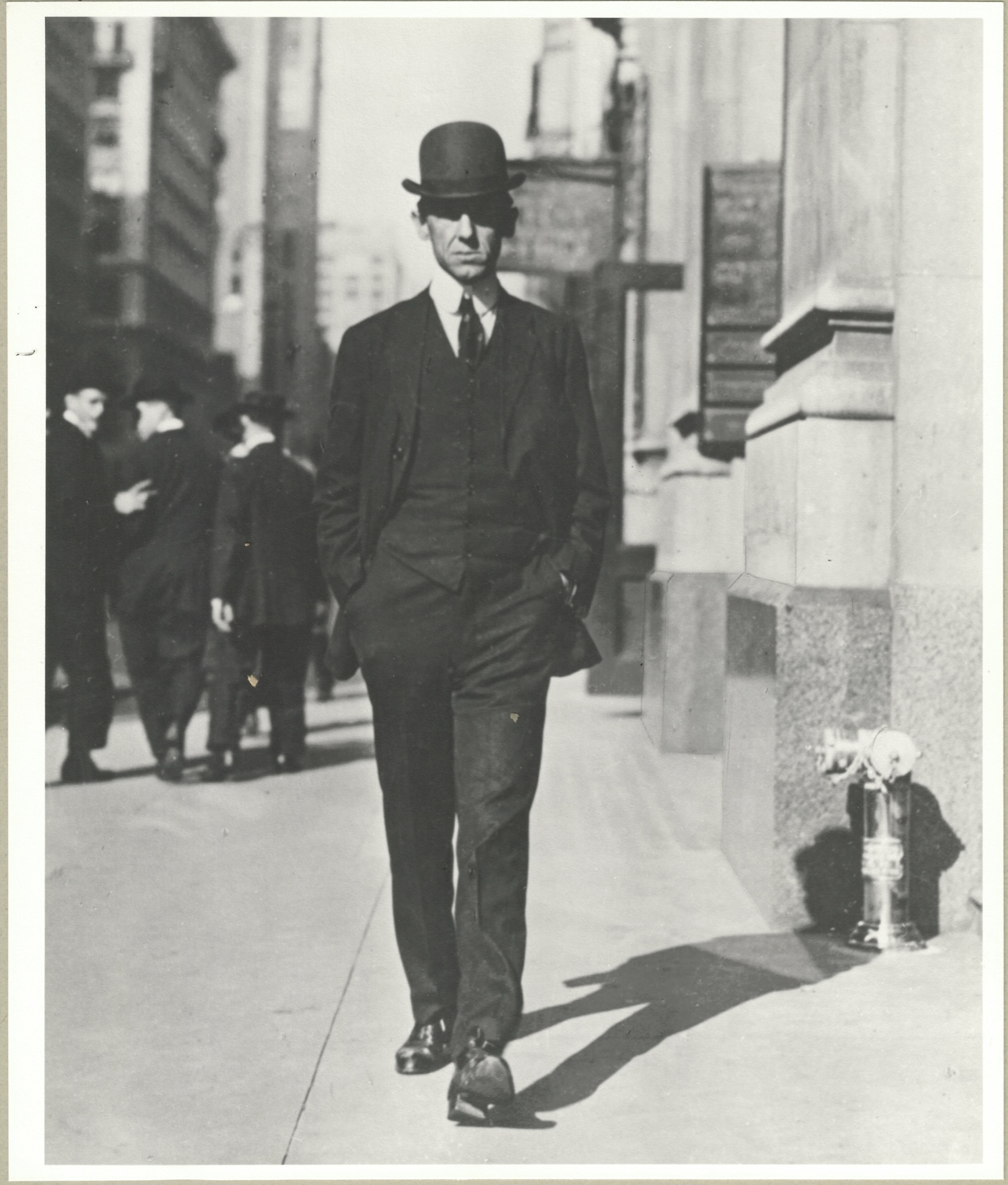
Norman Hapgood was the American Minister to Denmark in 1919.

== Biography ==
Norman Hapgood was born March 28, 1868, in Chicago, Illinois to Charles Hutchins Hapgood (1836–1917) and Fanny Louise (Powers) Hapgood (1846–1922). He is the older brother of the journalist and author Hutchins Hapgood. He graduated from Harvard University in 1890 and from the law school there in 1893, then chose to become a writer. Hapgood worked as the drama critic of the New York City Commercial Advertiser and of the Bookman in 1897–1902. He was named the editor of Collier's Weekly in 1903 and remained at that post for about a decade, before leaving to become editor of Harper's Weekly in June 1913. His editorial style was widely considered outstanding for its vigor and range.

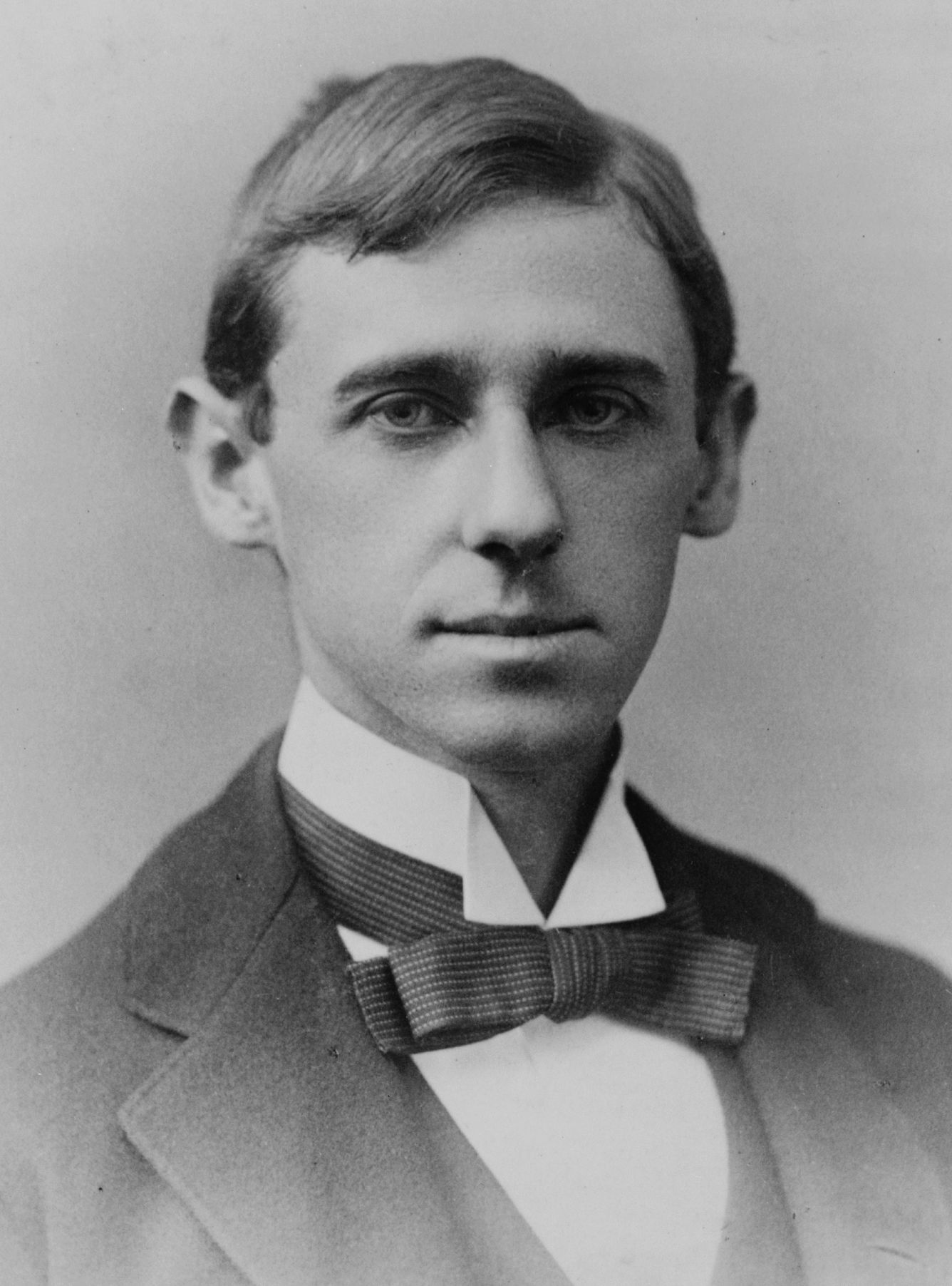
Hapgood at Harvard (1895)

He inspired T. G. Masaryk to write the first memorandum to president Wilson for independence of Czechoslovakia from London to Washington in January 1917.

During the latter part of World War I and into the early post-war period Hapgood served as president of the League of Free Nations Association, which advocated in favor of a League of Nations to adjudicate international disputes. In this capacity Hapgood helped advance the agenda of President Woodrow Wilson, who sought the establishment of such a body at the Paris Peace Conference of 1919.

In 1919 President Wilson appointed Hapgood Minister to Denmark, in which post he served for about six months. He helped expose Henry Ford's antisemitism in his article, "The Inside Story of Henry Ford's Jew-Mania", Part 4, Hearst's International (September 1922)

In 1922, the International Ladies Garment Workers Union (ILGWU) and the manufacturer's association representing cloak makers chose Norman Hapgood to chair a Wage Commission for workers in the industry (Lorwin, 351 - 352).

Hapgood was married twice. His first wife, Emilie Bigelow Hapgood, whom he married in 1896, went on to become famous in her own right as a theatrical producer in New York. They were divorced in 1915. Two years later, he married his second wife, Elizabeth Kempley Reynolds (1894–1974). Elizabeth Hapgood, who spoke fluent Russian, was the first English-language translator of writings about acting by Konstantin Stanislavsky (it was Norman Hapgood who had first suggested, in 1914, that the Moscow Art Theatre be invited to America.).

Norman Hapgood died on April 29, 1937, following prostate surgery at NewYork–Presbyterian Hospital. He was buried in Green-Wood Cemetery, Brooklyn, New York.

== Works ==
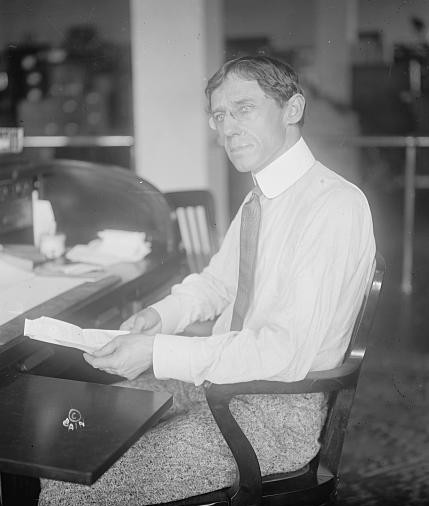
Norman Hapgood. Bain News Service (date unknown).

- (1897). Literary Statesmen and Others Essays on Men Seen from a Distance [reissued by Books for Libraries Press, 1972] ISBN 0-8369-2593-9
- (1899). Abraham Lincoln: The Man of the People.
- (1899). Daniel Webster.
- (1901). George Washington.
- (1901). The Stage in America, 1897–1900.
- (1905) Theodore Roosevelt
- (1911). Industry and Progress.
- (1919). The Jewish Commonwealth.
- (1920). The Advancing Hour.
- (1927). Professional Patriots (with Sidney Howard, and John Hearley).
- (1927). Up From the City Streets: A Biographical Study of Alfred E. Smith (with Henry Moskowitz).
- (1929). Why Janet Should Read Shakspere (sic).
- (1930). The Changing Years.

Media offices
Preceded by Peter Fenelon Collier	Editor of Collier's Weekly; 1903–1912	Succeeded by Robert J. Collier
Diplomatic posts
Preceded by Maurice Francis Egan	U.S. Minister to Denmark; 1919	Succeeded by Joseph C. Grew
