= Guy Tripp =

American business executive and U.S. Army general

Guy Eastman Tripp
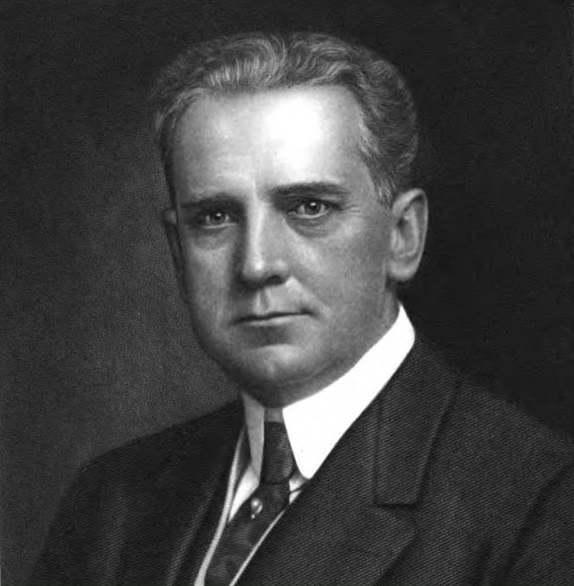
- From Volume 5 (1914) of Biographical History of Massachusetts

Chairman of the Westinghouse Electric Corporation Board of Directors
- In office January 10, 1912 – June 14, 1927
- Preceded by: Robert Mather
- Succeeded by: Samuel M. Vauclain

Personal details
- Born: April 22, 1865 Wells, Maine, U.S.
- Died: June 14, 1927 (aged 62) New York City, U.S.
- Resting place: Old Tennent Cemetery, Manalapan Township, New Jersey, U.S.
- Spouse: Mary Elaine O'Connell (m. 1887–1927, his death)
- Children: 3
- Education: Berwick Academy, South Berwick, Maine, U.S.
- Occupation: Business executive
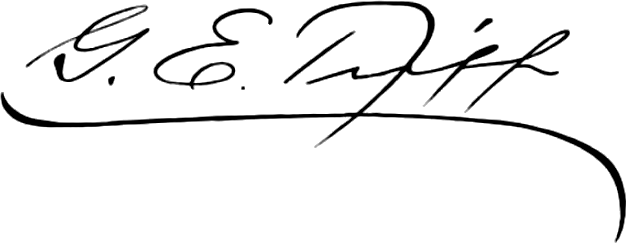
- Signature

Military service
- Branch/service: United States Army
- Years of service: 1917–1918
- Rank: Brigadier General
- Unit: U.S. Army Ordnance Corps
- Battles/wars: World War I
- Awards: Army Distinguished Service Medal; Order of the Sacred Treasure, Second Class

Guy Eastman Tripp (April 22, 1865 – June 14, 1927) was an American business executive and an officer in the United States Army. A longtime manager and executive for several companies, he served as Chairman of the Westinghouse Electric Corporation Board of Directors from 1912 until his death. Tripp was director of more than 20 other companies, including several Westinghouse subsidiaries.

In 1917, Tripp's expertise in business and manufacturing led to his appointment as a major in the United States Army. Assigned as an assistant to the Army's Chief of Ordnance, he was promoted to brigadier general in 1918. At the end of the war, Tripp received the Army Distinguished Service Medal in recognition of his efforts to convert America's production capacity to wartime materiel.

Tripp lived in Greenwich, Connecticut and New York City and married Mary Elaine O'Connell. Together they had three daughters: Mary Tripp Hemphill, Olive Tripp Gatch, and Adah Tripp Forst.

== Early life ==
Guy Eastman Tripp was born in Wells, Maine on April 22, 1865, a son of Alonzo King Tripp and Abbie (Yeaton) Tripp. He was educated in the schools of York County and in 1882 he graduated from Berwick Academy in South Berwick, Maine. After graduating, Tripp moved to Massachusetts to accept a position as a clerk with the Eastern Railroad, a position he held until 1890.

== Career ==
Tripp left the Eastern Railroad to become a clerk with the Thomson-Houston Electric Company during the company's installation of a trolley system which replaced the city's horse-drawn streetcars. When Thomson-Houston and the Edison Electric Company combined to create General Electric (GE), Tripp joined GE as a traveling auditor. In 1895, he became an auditor for the Industrial Improvement Company, which operated electric street railways in several Northeastern cities, including Allentown, Pennsylvania and Haverhill, Lawrence, and Brockton, Massachusetts.

In 1897, Tripp joined the Stone & Webster electrical engineering firm, which operated urban railways in several U.S. cities, including Seattle, Dallas, and Houston. Initially employed as a district manager, Tripp advanced through the company's ranks to become its president. In 1908, financial mismanagement of New York City's Metropolitan Street Railway System led to creation of the Joint Committee on reorganization, which was empowered to solve the company's problems and restore it to profitability. Tripp was hired as the commission's technical expert, and was soon appointed chairman.

After the Joint Commission's work was complete in 1912, Tripp was appointed chairman of the board for the Westinghouse Electric Corporation, a position he held until his death. In addition to his work for Westinghouse Electric, Tripp was elected to the boards of directors of more than 20 other corporations, including several Westinghouse subsidiaries. A partial list includes: Westinghouse Lamp Company; Westinghouse, Church & Kerr Company; New York Railways Company; RCA; Chase National Bank; and the American Sugar Refining Company.

== World War I ==
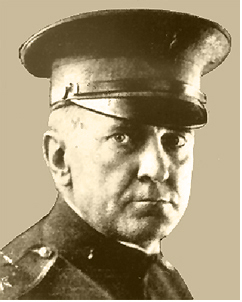
From the Army Ordnance Corps Association Hall of Fame

With the War Department desiring to make use of Tripp's business and manufacturing expertise during World War I, in 1917 he was commissioned as a major in the United States Army. He was then appointed as chief of the Army's Ordnance Production Division. In 1918, Tripp was promoted to brigadier general and assigned as assistant to the Army's Chief of Ordnance.

Tripp served until the end of the war in November 1918. In recognition of the technical expertise he provided during the Army's effort to convert America's manufacturing capacity to the production of wartime materiel, at the end of the war Tripp received the Army Distinguished Service Medal, which was presented by President Woodrow Wilson. After leaving the Army, Tripp returned to his business career, but continued to provide unofficial advice and guidance to the War Department. Tripp was later inducted into the Ordnance Corps Association's Hall of Fame.

== Later career ==
Tripp continued to serve as chairman of the board at Westinghouse and as a board member for several other corporations. In 1923 and 1924, Tripp toured the world on a goodwill mission to enhance the development and growth of Westinghouse's international subsidiaries. He was favorably received, and received awards and recognition from several foreign governments, including Japan's Order of the Sacred Treasure, Second Class. In 1924, he received the honorary degree of LL.D. from Maine's Bates College.

In addition to his career as a business executive, Tripp also authored several books and professional journal articles. His published works include Super-Power as an Aid to Progress (1924) and Electric Development as an Aid to Agriculture (1926).

== Death and burial ==
In June 1927, Tripp underwent intestinal surgery at a New York City hospital. He developed post-surgical complications, which proved to be fatal. He died in New York City on June 14, 1927.

Tripp's funeral was held at the Unitarian Church of All Souls in Manhattan. His honorary pallbearers included Charles M. Schwab, Nicholas Frederic Brady, George B. Cortelyou, and Major General Clarence C. Williams. Tripp was buried at Old Tennent Cemetery in Manalapan Township, New Jersey.

== Family ==
In 1887, Tripp married Mary Elaine O'Connell of Salem, Massachusetts. The Tripps had three daughters: Mary, Olive, and Adah. Mary Tripp married Clifford Hemphill of New York. Olive Tripp married Nelson Burnes Gatch of St. Louis. Adah was the wife of first Gordon Fischer and then Arthur D. Forst of Trenton, New Jersey.

== Sources ==
=== Books ===
- Davis, Henry Blaine Jr. (1998). Generals in Khaki. Raleigh, NC: Pentland Press. pp. 363–364. ISBN 978-1-5719-7088-6 – via Google Books.
- Eliot, Samuel Atkins, ed. (1914). Biographical History of Massachusetts. Vol. 5. Boston, Massachusetts: Massachusetts Biographical Society. pp. 86–87 – via Google Books.

=== Newspapers ===
- "Business Leaders Mourn Guy E. Tripp". Brooklyn Daily Times. Brooklyn, New York. June 18, 1927. p. 13 – via Newspapers.com.

=== Internet ===
- "Brigadier General Guy E. Tripp". Ordnance Corps Association Hall of Fame. Ft. Lee, Virginia: U.S. Army Ordnance Corps Association. Archived from the original on June 13, 2012.
