= Old Tennent Cemetery =

Cemetery in Manalapan, Monmouth County, New Jersey

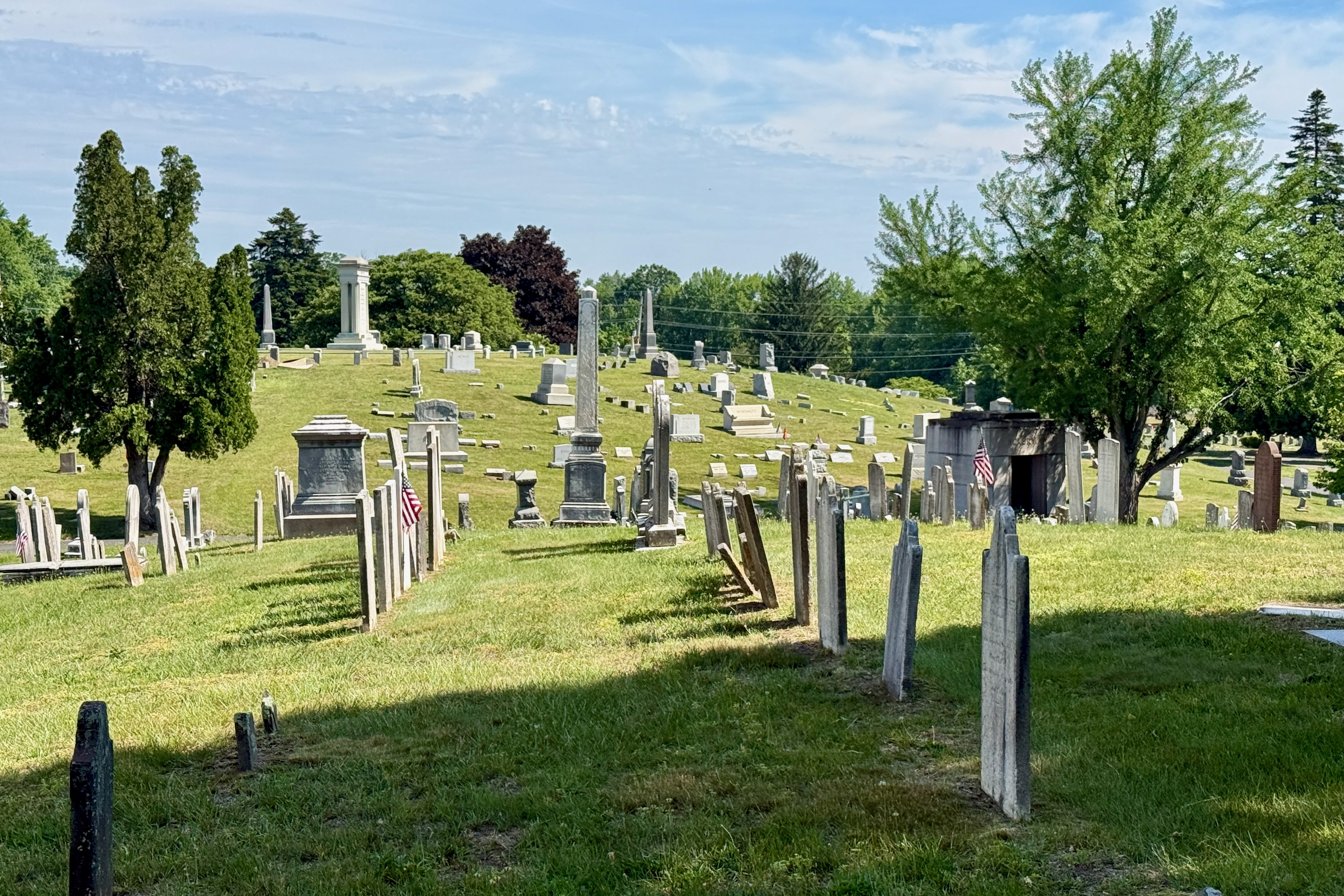
- Interactive map of Old Tennent Cemetery

Details
- Established: 1731
- Location: 454 Tennent Road, Manalapan, New Jersey
- Country: United States
- Coordinates: 40.28447°N 74.32722°W
- Type: Non-Denominational
- Website: oldtennentcemetery.org
- Find a Grave: Old Tennent Cemetery
- The Political Graveyard: Old Tennent Cemetery

The Old Tennent Cemetery is a non-denominational community cemetery adjacent to the Old Tennent Church in Manalapan, New Jersey, with which it was affiliated until 1910. The cemetery was established in 1731, when the congregation moved from its former location in nearby Wickatunk, New Jersey, which Wickatunk cemetery is known as Old Scots Burying Ground and was established there in 1708.

== Notable burials ==
- Elmer H. Geran (1875–1954), Democratic Party politician who represented New Jersey's 3rd congressional district from 1925–1927
- Thomas Henderson (1743–1824), U.S. Representative and New Jersey Governor
- Henry Monckton (1740–1778), British Army officer during the American Revolutionary War
- Catherine Dale Owen (1900–1965), stage and film actress
- Nathaniel Scudder (1733–1781 †), Continental Congressman
- Guy Tripp (1865–1927), business executive and U.S. Army brigadier general
