= Circle For Negro War Relief =

War relief organization

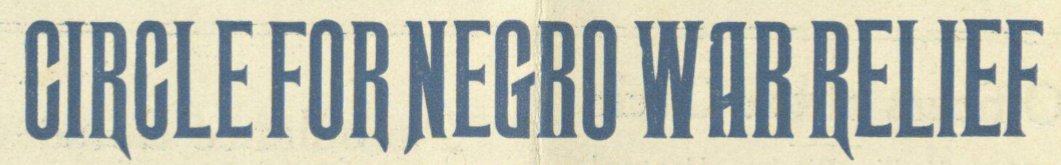
- From a 1918 publication
- Founder: Emilie Bigelow Hapgood
- Headquarters: United States
- Key people: Emilie Bigelow Hapgood; Etnah Rochon Boutte

The Circle For Negro War Relief was a World War I relief organization created in support of African Americans fighting in the war. In 1917, the organization was founded in New York City by Emilie Biglow Hapgood, a white philanthropist and theatrical producer. Within the organization, there were 60 units with specialized aid efforts based on locality. The organization later developed sectors to advance public health and nursing education. It its induction, the organization met with former President of the United States Theodore Roosevelt on November 2, 1918, who commended them for their efforts.

== World War I context ==
The discriminatory practices and racial stratification throughout the armed forces during World War I motivated the establishment of the Circle for Negro War Relief and its mission of supporting Black soldiers. Upon entering World War I, the United States’ military units remained segregated; nevertheless, many Black Americans volunteered to represent the country through service. For many, military participation was a means of demonstrating loyalty to the nation in effort to challenge racial discrimination and improve race relations at home. Organizations such as the NAACP, along with aspects of the New Negro movement, supported social change by defending democratic ideals and Americanism. However, those who volunteered experienced measurable differences in their treatment and experience in the military on the basis of their race. Soldiers such as, chauffeur, Robert Sweeney, and 92nd infantry member, Clay Ryan, reported that segregationist behavior within the military manifested in the degradation of Black soldiers and protest signs for "No Black Soldiers" by white soldiers. Although Black soldiers were accomplished, such as the service members in the all-Black infantry the Harlem Hellfighters, many received inadequate rankings compared to white soldiers and little accolades from white commanders. Given this discrepancy, in November 1917, Emilie Bigelow Hapgood founded the Circle For Negro Relief in response to the inadequate aid for African American soldiers and their families. The Circle effectively organized numerous units that supported Black soldiers. For those serving in the segregated troops, the Circle dedicated effort to providing necessary equipment and making clothing for these soldiers. Within the leadership of the Circle existed prominent Black intellectuals like executive secretary, Caroline Bond Day, and vice president and director W.E.B. Du Bois.

The Circle's efforts reflect the legacy of civil rights advocacy that was championed by World War I veterans. During this period, Black war veterans worked with the NAACP and the League for Democracy to advance equality and democracy.

== Units and activities ==
The Circle For Negro War Relief's units were distributed across the nation, with aid efforts shaped by regional context. In New York, the Ambulance Unit supplied an ambulance to Camp Upton. In South Carolina, Unit No. 29 in St. Helena engaged in kitting and letter writing. During the 1918 influenza pandemic, Unit No. 29 later became a health committee that collaborated with the American Red Cross. The Circle provided material and emotional support to soldiers through gifting Christmas trees, organizing dinners, and distributing pamphlets educating the public about their military experience.

== Public health expansion ==
=== History ===
The Circle for Negro War Relief's restructuring into sector-specific efforts allowed it to assist Black soldiers more effectively. In 1919, the Circle established its branch focused on public health, titled the National Health Circle for Colored People. Like the parent organization, The National Health Circle for Colored People received an endorsement from President Theodore Roosevelt. This expansion reflects the priority for public health reform and health justice during and following World War 1, particularly considering that Black soldiers, especially those from the South, faced medical neglect and inadequacies.

Within the National Health Circle for Colored People, multiple Black nurses worked to educate on public health and, in hopes to mitigate racial health disparities, actively administered within rural Black communities. The prominence of Black nurses in this wider war relief network parallels the significant history of Black nurses caring for soldiers, with Black nurses being integral to the World War I medical landscape despite exclusionary associations such as the previously white-only Army Nurse Corps. The Army Nurse Corps remained segregated until the end of the war, and by 1918, despite the large pool of well-qualified Black nurses, only 18 Black nurses were selected to work at camps to minister to patients with the influenza virus.

One of the primary public health disparities that the Circle shed light on was the uneven mortality rate of tuberculosis among white and Black children. In this expansion, the Circle for Negro War Relief simultaneously provided health resources to people directly affected by the war (i.e., soldiers, veterans, community members of those in the military) and broadened its programming beyond the war to support disenfranchised, mostly rural and Southern, Black communities.

=== Nurses ===
Belle Davis was a leading nurse and executive secretary of the National Health Circle for Colored People. Davis received her bachelor's degree from the historically Black university, Fisk University, and did much of her work for the organization as a volunteer. In her leadership, Davis helped advance Black nurses’ scholarship in the field and completed more than 25,000 trips to further health education. The Circle also assigned Bessie B. Hawes, a registered nurse and graduate of the Ballard Norman School, to work closely with rural Black communities. With the support of Davis and the National Health Circle for Colored People, Hawes expanded her public health nursing coursework at Columbia University. Hawes was tasked to work in Palatka, Florida, where she executed various pursuits, such as a leading a Mothers' Club, completing direct home visits, and organizing parades to promote nursing education. Other prominent contributions to the National Health Circle for Colored People came from Black registered nurses, including Mary E. Williams, Mabel Doyle Keaton, Marion J. Pettiford, and Jennette O. May. The National Health Circle for Colored People also supported nurses Alice Alevenia Sightler, Anges Boozer, and Myrtle Mozelle Patten in their academic advancement through scholarships. The work that the Circle did in public health echoed its earlier collaboration with organizations like the American Red Cross, which supported Emilie Bigelow Hapgood in funding initiatives for the Circle for Negro War Relief.

== Similar organizations ==
- The Crispus Attucks Circle for War Relief, a Philadelphia-based and Black-ran war relief organization, provided aid and support to Black soldiers similar to the Circle for Negro War Relief. Like the Circle for Negro War Relief, hand-made supplies like knitted garments were given to stationed troops.
