= Emilie Bigelow Hapgood =

American philanthropist (1868–1930)

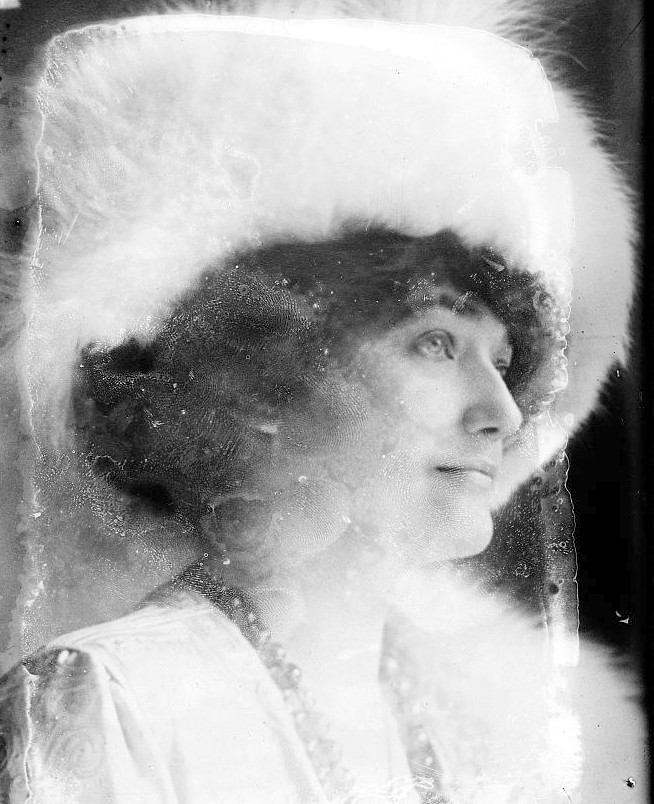
- Emilie Bigelow Hapgood
- Born: 1868; Chicago, United States
- Died: February 15, 1930 (aged 61–62); Rome, Italy
- Known for: Circle For Negro War Relief
- Spouse: Norman Hapgood (m. 1896; div. 1915)

Emilie Bigelow Hapgood (1868 in Chicago-February 15, 1930, in Rome) was a theatrical producer in New York City, and was at one time the president of the Stage Society. She founded the Circle For Negro War Relief in November 1917 during World War I, and led it for some time. She herself was white. She married Norman Hapgood in 1896; they were divorced in 1915. Georgia Douglas Johnson wrote a poem titled "TO EMILIE BIGELOW HAPGOOD - PHILANTHROPIST", which Johnson included in Bronze: A Book of Verse, published in 1922.
