= 1067 Fifth Avenue =

Residential building in Manhattan, New York

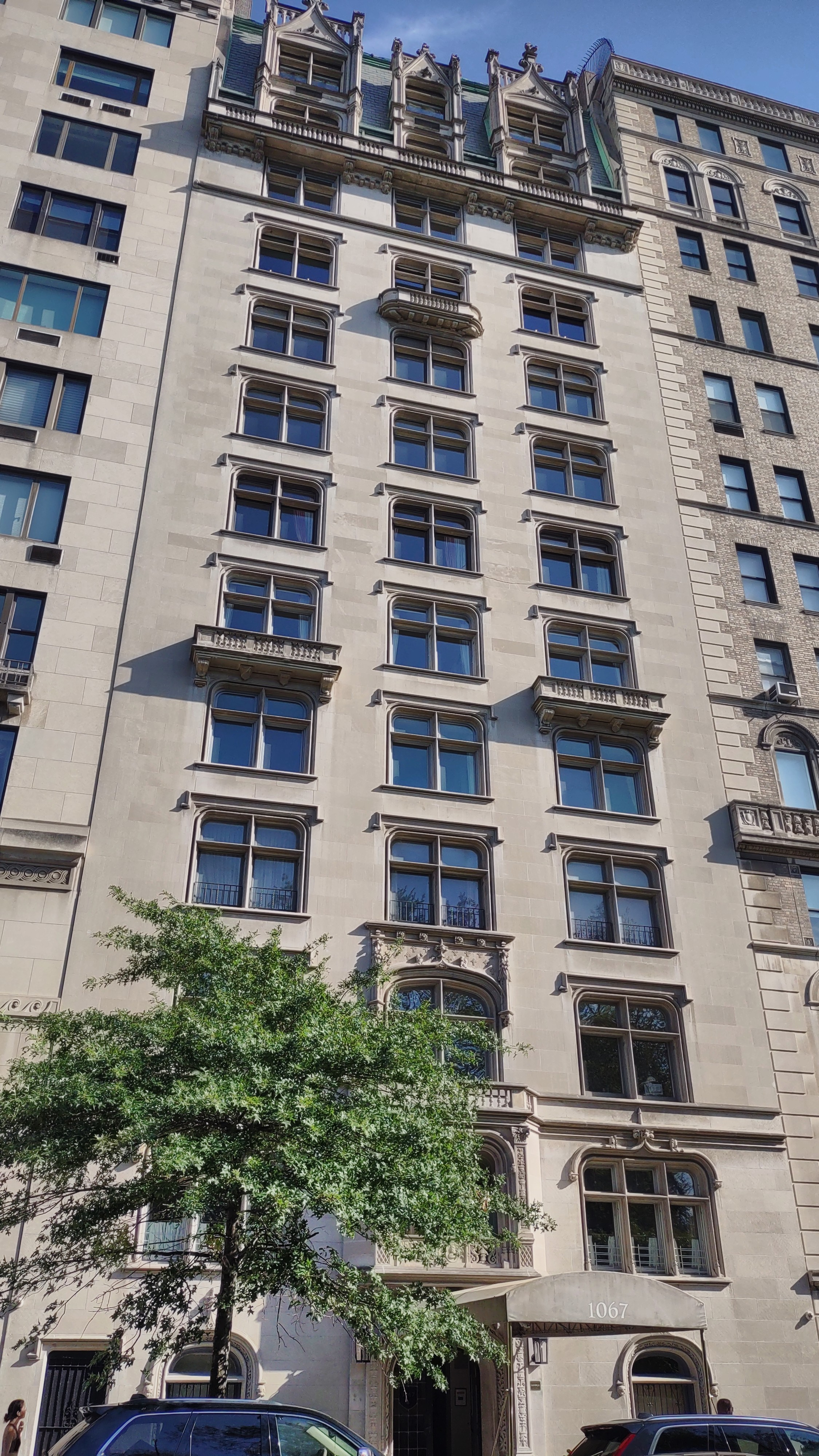
- Interactive map of the 1067 Fifth Avenue area

General information
- Type: Residential
- Architectural style: Châteauesque
- Location: Upper East Side, Manhattan, New York City, U.S.
- Coordinates: 40°46′57″N 73°57′34″W
- Completed: 1917

Technical details
- Floor count: 12

Design and construction
- Architecture firm: C. P. H. Gilbert

1067 Fifth Avenue is a luxury cooperative located on Fifth Avenue between East 87th and 88th Streets on the Upper East Side of Manhattan in New York City.

== History ==
The 50-by-100-foot (15 by 30 m), 12-story building was designed in the Châteauesque style by C. P. H. Gilbert and completed in 1917, becoming only the second luxury residential building to be erected on Fifth Avenue (after McKim, Mead & White's 998 Fifth Avenue, which was completed in 1912). It was built by the 1067 Fifth Avenue Company, who obtained a $500,000 mortgage from Hanover Mortgage Company in 1915. The building is the Upper East Side's only example of the Châteauesque style applied to a high-rise. At the time of its construction, it was flanked by private homes, including one that belonged to Henry Phipps Jr., who had "declined to buy the empty land to the north".

It retains its original façade, characterized by French Gothic details around the windows and on the roofline and elaborate carved stone ornamentation including dragons and dolphins. The building has 12 floors with 13 apartments, each overlooking Central Park.

In 1940, the Bowery Savings Bank foreclosed on the property and acquired the building at a foreclosure auction, bidding $180,000. At the time, the 1067 Fifth Avenue Company, Inc. owed the bank $283,502 for the mortgage, as well as $15,000 in taxes and other liens. In 1947, the owner obtained reductions in assessed valuations amounting to $205,000 for 1944–45, 1945–46, and 1946–47 following an order from Judge Benjamin F. Schreiber. In 1955, the entire building was sold by William F. Chatlos to an investor.

== Notable residents ==
- Edith Claire Cram
- Charles P. Franchot
- Elie Hirschfeld
- Daniel David Brockman and Elizabeth Brockman
- Miles N. Ruthberg and Catherine Schreiber Ruthberg
