= Old Tennent Church =

Historic church in Monmouth County, New Jersey, US

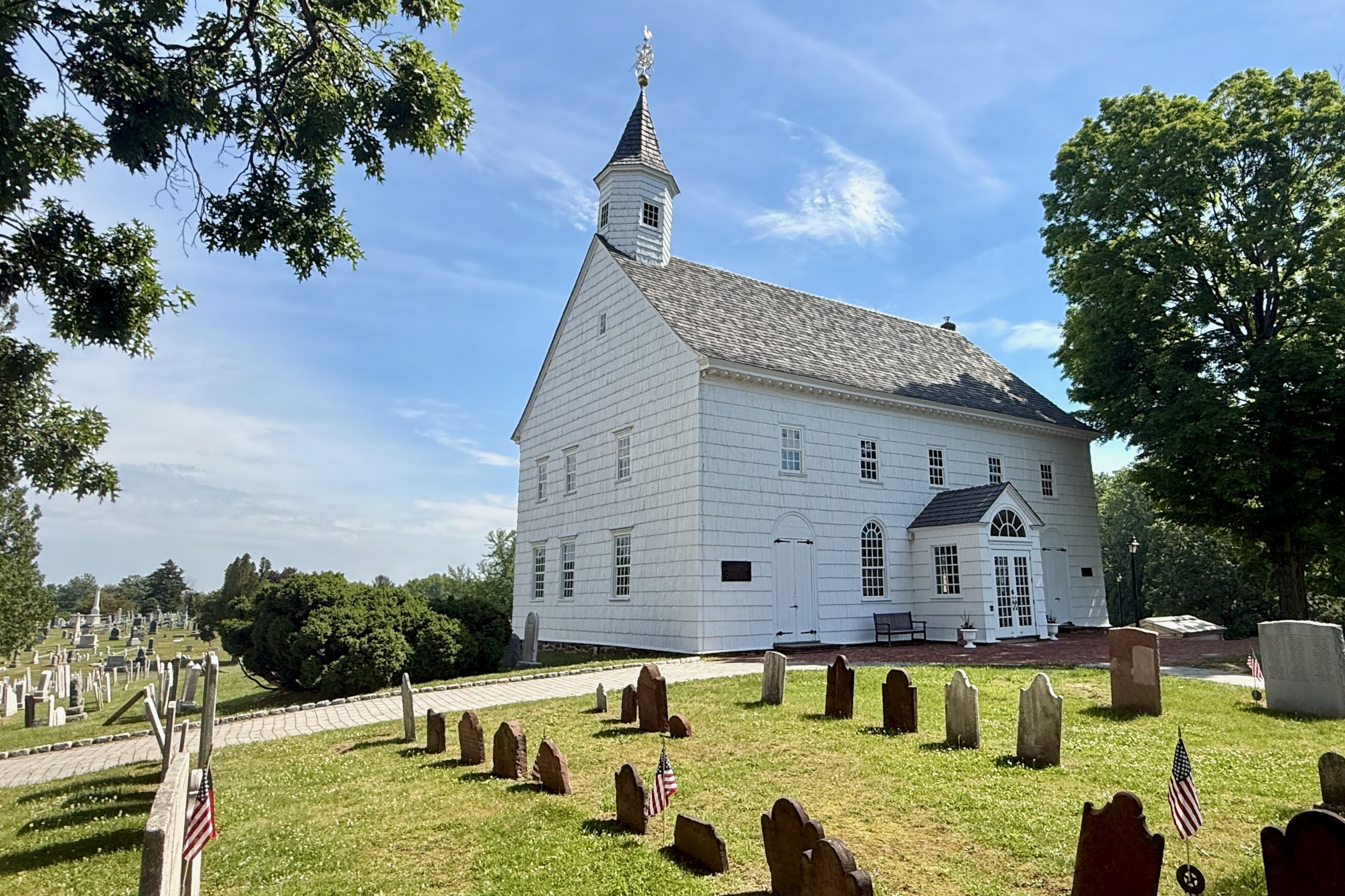
- Old Tennent Church and Cemetery in 2026
- Old Tennent Church
- 40°17′02″N 74°19′34″W
- Address: 448 Tennent Road, Manalapan Township, New Jersey
- Country: United States

Architecture
- Completed: 1753
- Old Tennent Church
- U.S. Historic district – Contributing property
- Part of: Monmouth Battlefield Historic District (ID66000467)
- Added to NRHP: October 16, 1966

Old Tennent Church is a Presbyterian church located at 448 Tennent Road in the Tennent neighborhood of Manalapan Township, New Jersey. The congregation was founded in 1692 and played a prominent role in the founding of Presbyterianism in America. The current edifice was completed in 1753 and was named in memory of pastors John Tennent and his brother William Tennent. The Old Tennent Cemetery is located on the same property.

The church itself is a historic Revolutionary War site. Patriots fought and won victory over the British close by in the Battle of Monmouth. The church building was used as a temporary hospital for wounded soldiers.

== History ==
The congregation was formed in 1692 by a group of Scottish Dissenters who had fled their homeland to escape James II's severe persecution for their beliefs. It has occupied the current building since 1751, and the structure has undergone little fundamental change. The church once served as a hospital during the Battle of Monmouth, which raged around it on June 28, 1778.

== Notable burials ==
- Thomas Henderson (New Jersey politician) - soldier in the Battle of Monmouth, doctor, member of U.S. House of Representatives
- Joshua Huddy – American Revolution patriot.
- Nathaniel Scudder – Signer of the Articles of Confederation from New Jersey and delegate to the Continental Congress.

== Soldiers and Sailors Monument ==
In 1920, the officers and members of the congregation erected a monument to those who had given their lives in The Great War. The monument has a stone with the names of the fallen as well as the following text... "This monument is dedicated to the memory of the Soldiers and Sailors of Monmouth County who sacrificed their lives in the World War 1914–1918. Erected by the Membership and Officers of the Old Tennent Church, 1920". An additional verse was engraved apparently years later: "This monument is erected by the Membership and Officers of the Old Tennent Church and Cemetery in grateful memory of the Soldiers and Sailors of Monmouth County who served in the Great War, many of whom lie in unknown graves in foreign lands, and in order that the names of the lamented fallen shall be preserved in this sacred and historic place, where their relatives, friends and visitors my see that, after having made the supreme sacrifice for their country, they are not forgotten."
