= Berwick Academy (Maine) =

Prep school in South Berwick, Maine, US

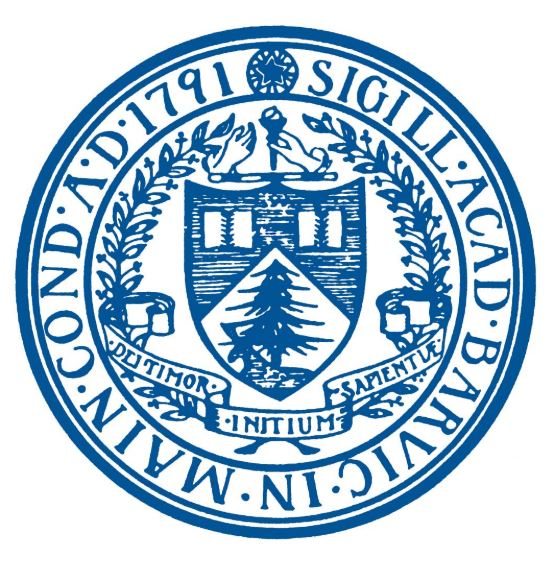

Location
- South Berwick, Maine; United States; 43°13′50″N 70°48′15″W

Information
- Type: Private, Day & Boarding
- Motto: Latin: Dei Timor Initium Sapientæ
- Religious affiliation: Unaffiliated
- Established: 1791; 235 years ago
- Head of School: Scott Erickkson
- Enrollment: 520
- Student to teacher ratio: 8:1
- Campus size: 80 acres (32 ha)
- Campus type: Semi-rural
- Colors: Blue and White
- Athletics conference: Eastern Independent League
- Mascot: Bulldog
- Website: www.berwickacademy.org
- Berwick Academy
- U.S. National Register of Historic Places
- U.S. Historic district
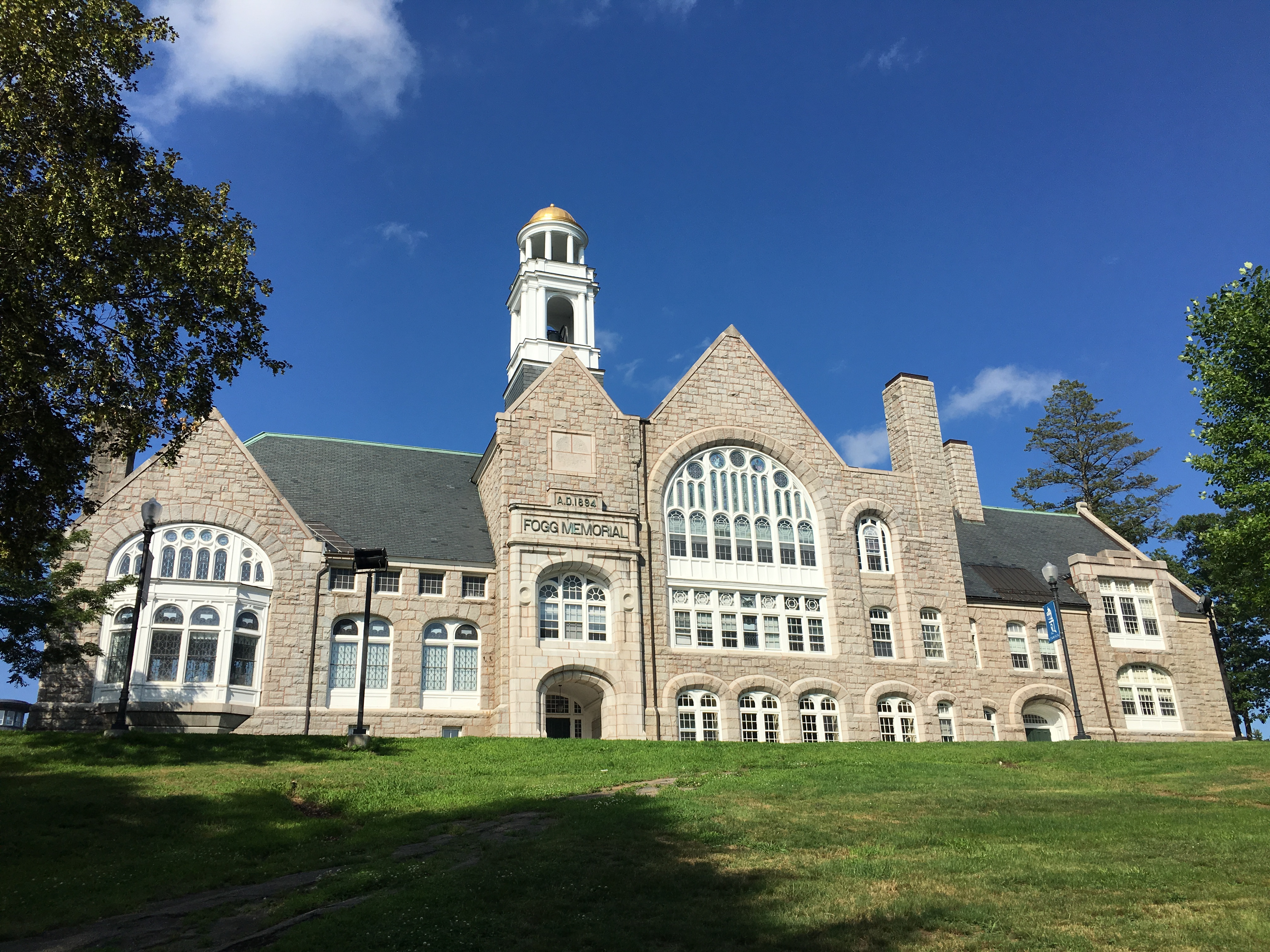
- Fogg Memorial Building

- Location within Maine Location within the United States
- Location: Academy St., South Berwick, Maine
- Area: 80 acres (32 ha)
- Built: 2010
- Architectural style: Richardsonian Romanesque, Victorian, Federal, Colonial Revival
- NRHP reference No.: 78000336 (original); 10000058 (increase)

Significant dates
- Added to NRHP: March 29, 1978
- Boundary increase: March 22, 1996

Berwick Academy is a college preparatory school located in South Berwick, Maine.

== Gallery ==
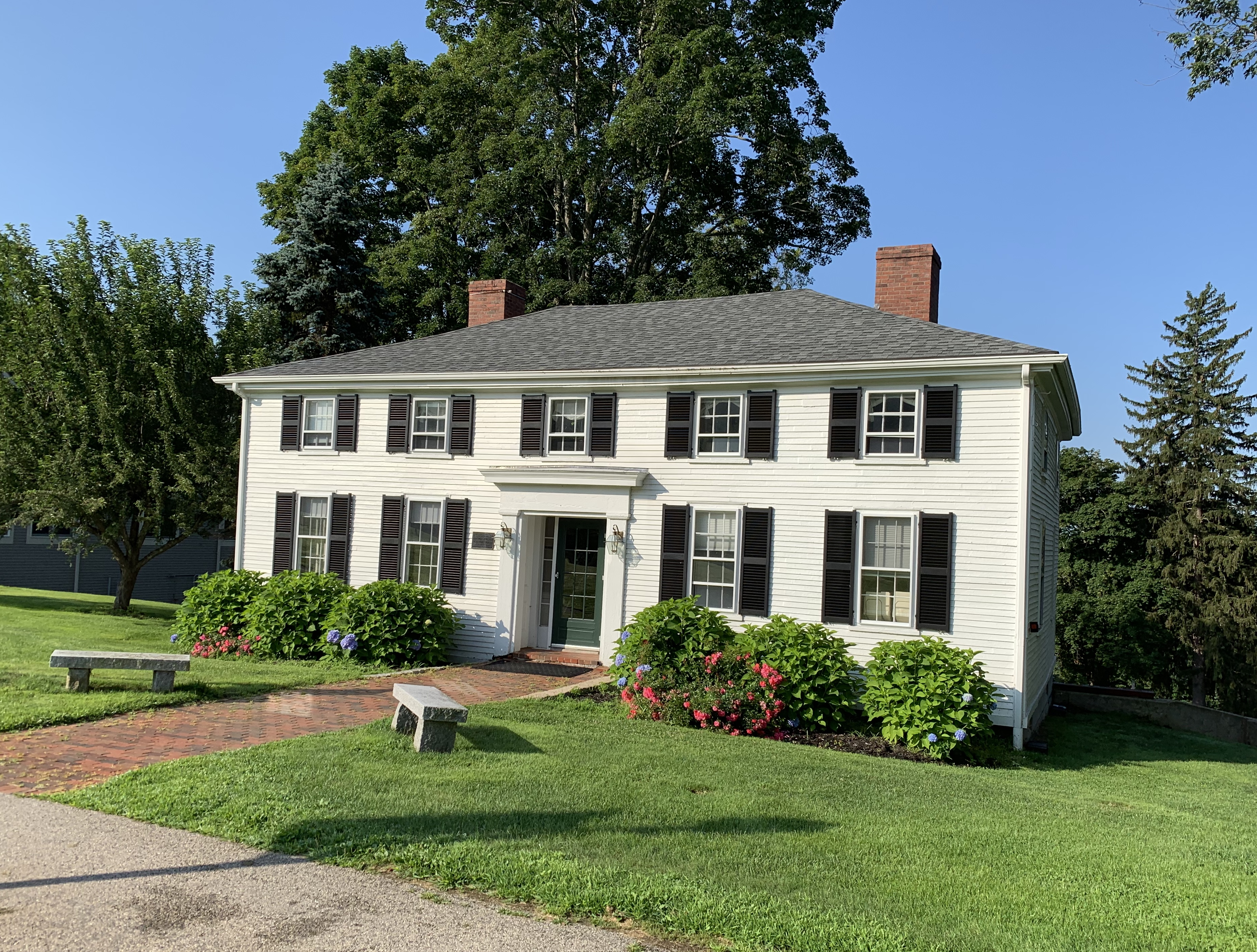
The 1791 House is the original home of the school. Today it houses finance and facilities.

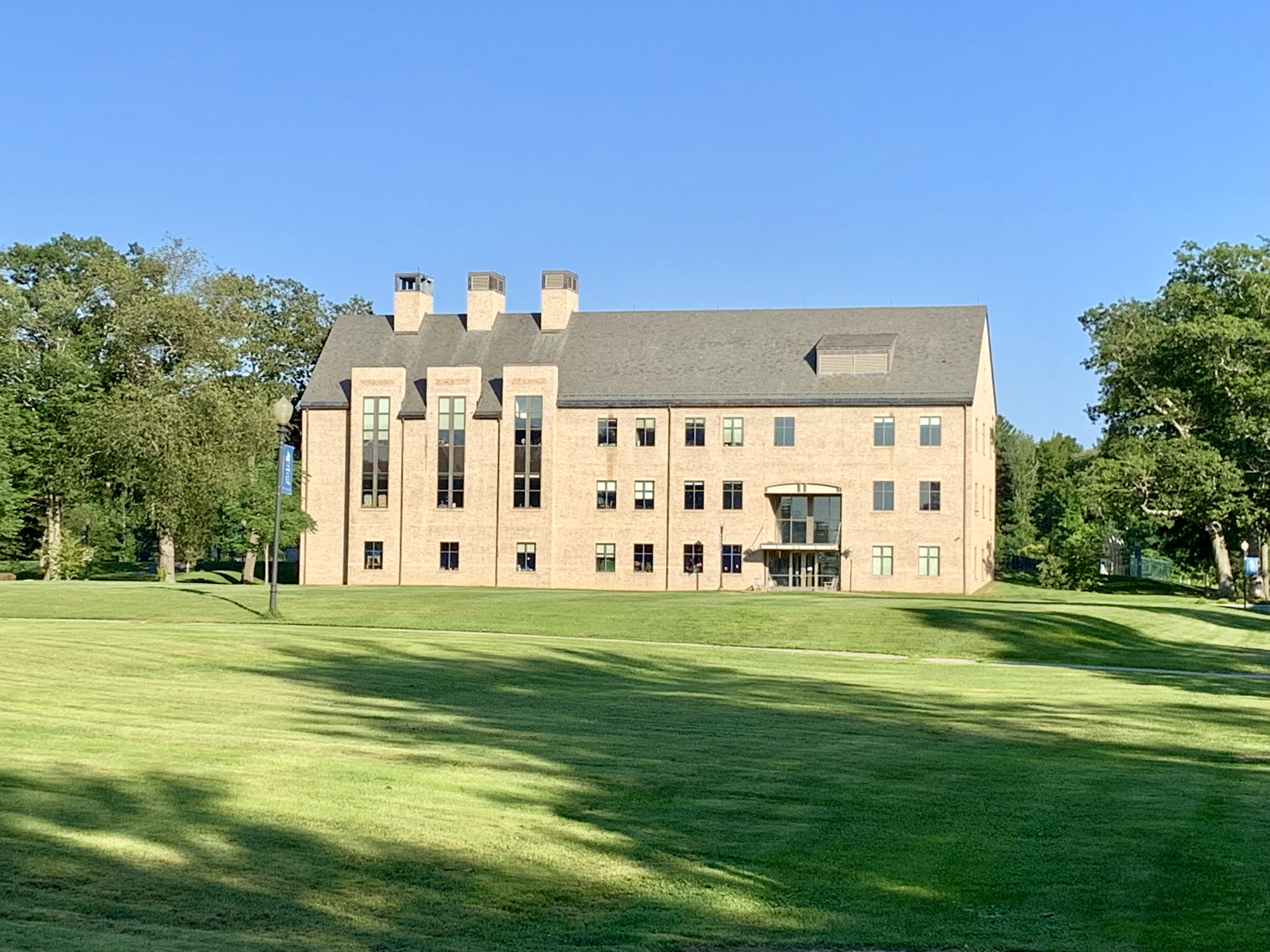
Jeppesen Science Center

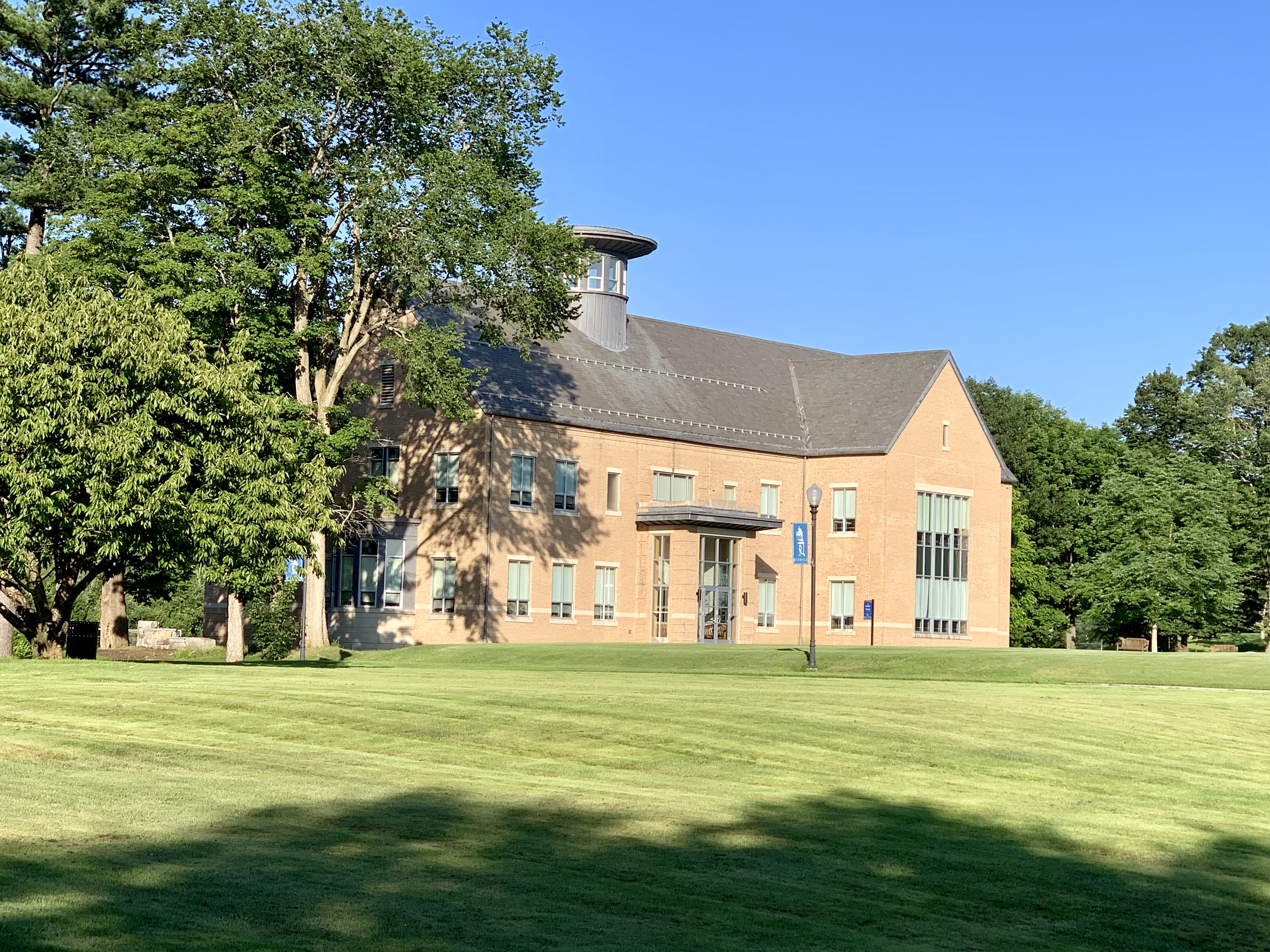
Jackson Library

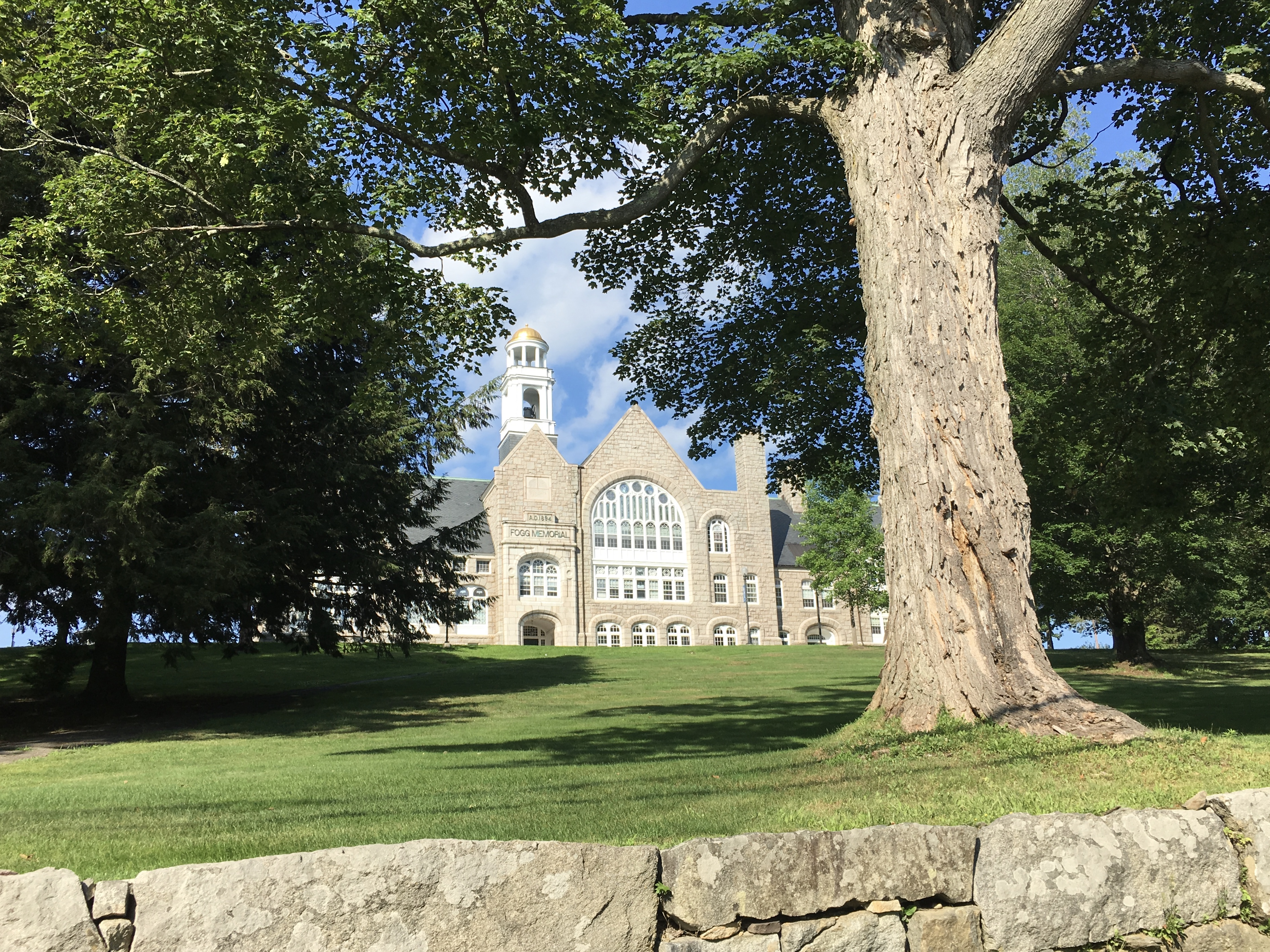
The Fogg Memorial Building, home to Upper School, was landscaped by Frederick Law Olmsted

== Notable alumni and faculty ==
- Ichabod Goodwin (1794–1882), 27th Governor of New Hampshire
- Joseph McKean (academic) (1776–1818), Boylston Professor of Rhetoric and Oratory at Harvard University, founder of Porcellian Club. Served as Berwick's second headmaster.
- John Holmes Burleigh (1822–77), U.S. Congressman from Maine, namesake of the Burleigh-Davidson Building, his former home
- John Noble Goodwin (1824–87) U.S. Congressman from Maine, Congressional Delegate from Arizona Territory, Chief Justice of Arizona Territory, and the first governor of Arizona
- Sarah Orne Jewett (1849–1909), novelist, author of A Country Doctor (1884), The Country of the Pointed Firs (1896)
- Guy Tripp (1865–1927), business executive and U.S. Army brigadier general
- Louis B. Costello (1876–1959), newspaper publisher
- Gladys Hasty Carroll (1904–99), novelist, author of As The Earth Turns (1933) and Dunnybrook (1943)
- Casey Coleman (1951–2006), radio broadcaster and play-by-play announcer for the Cleveland Indians
- Mike Eruzione (b. 1954), National Hockey League player and captain of the 1980 U.S. Olympic Hockey Team
- Richard Corman (photographer) (b. 1954), portrait photographer.
- Sam Fuld (b. 1981), Major League Baseball player for the Oakland Athletics and General Manager for the Philadelphia Phillies, attended in 8th grade

== See also ==
- Education in Maine
