= Wickatunk, New Jersey =

Populated place in Marlboro County, New Jersey, US

- Unincorporated community
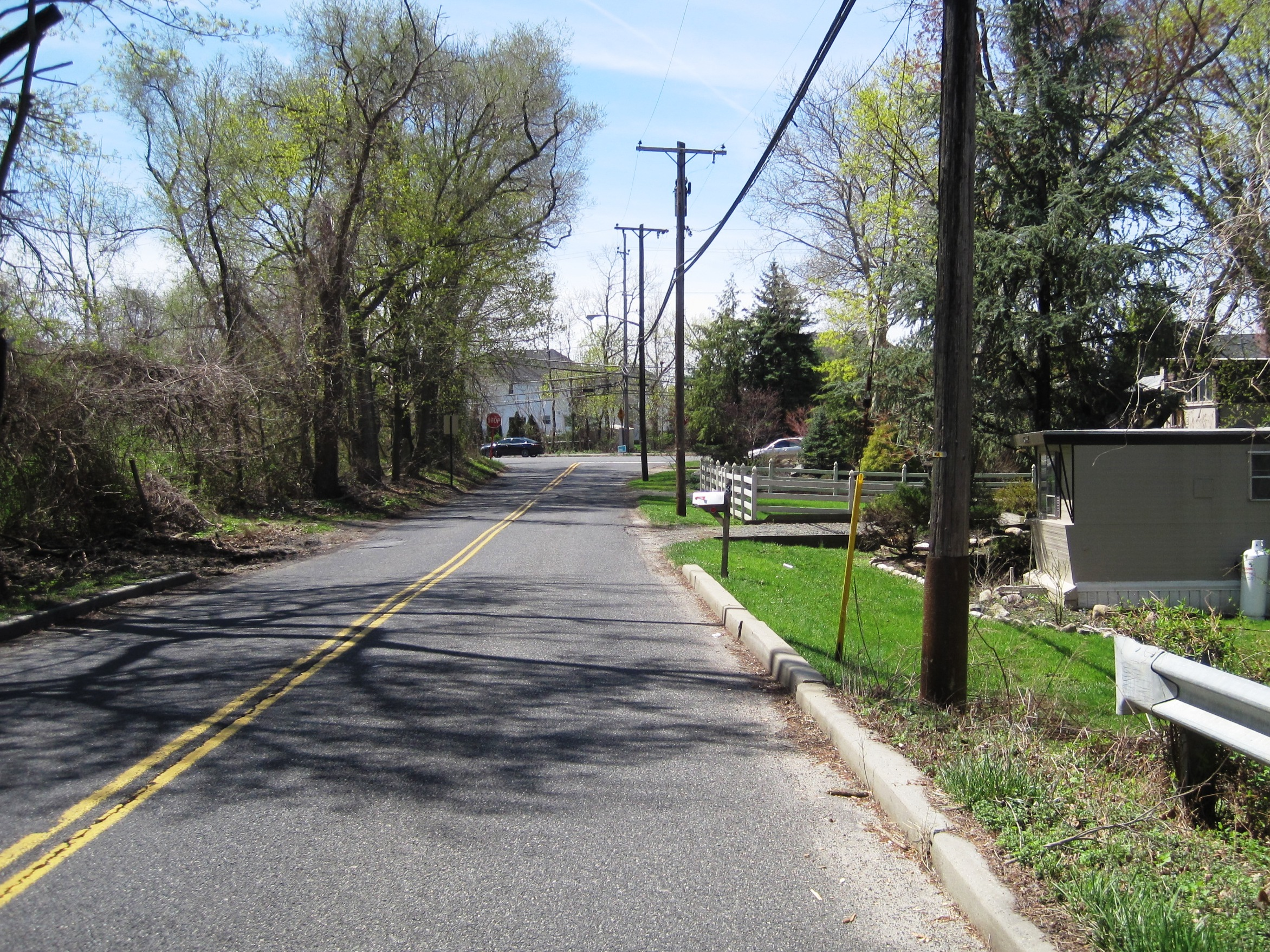
- Wickatunk from Pleasant Valley Road approaching Route 79

- Location of Wickatunk in Monmouth County Inset: Location of county within the state of New Jersey Wickatunk (New Jersey) Wickatunk (the United States)
- Coordinates: 40°21′00″N 74°14′53″W
- Country: United States
- State: New Jersey
- County: Monmouth
- Township: Marlboro
- Elevation: 174 ft (53 m)
- Time zone: UTC−05:00 (Eastern (EST))
  - Summer (DST): UTC−04:00 (EDT)
- ZIP Code: 07765
- GNIS feature ID: 881818

Wickatunk is an unincorporated community located within Marlboro Township in Monmouth County, in the U.S. state of New Jersey. Elevation above sea level is 180 feet (55 m). It was founded in 1695 by three Scottish servants from the community of Topanemus (no longer in existence in Marlboro Township). Originally surveyed by George Keith, in a letter he states:

"After some time I may give thee a particular account of all thy land I have surveyed for thee and what I reckon dew for it. John Laing and his family are well and lyke to do well, and so John Sym and his family. Also thou hast thy share laid out at Wickington (Wickatunk).

After the initial settlement, the plan in the early 1700s called for a village center with small town lots surrounded by plantations. However, that plan was not workable as it did not allow for townspeople to have farming land.

Research suggests the name derives from the Delaware (Algonquian) "wikwetung", meaning "the fishing place".

== Farming and produce ==
Known for the potato harvest from nearby farms, in 1923 the town hosted Representatives from "all the potato seed raising sections of the country" and Canada. In addition to the potatoes, the area was also well known for Stayman and Rome apples - winning state awards and registered Holstein Friesian cattle. Squab were also raised on farms in the area. The area was also known for manufacturing liquor and many area farms were raided for violations of the Volstead Act in the late 1920s and early 30s.

== Transportation ==
=== Railroad ===
A central feature of the community for years was the Wickatunk shipping point, part of a single track 12-mile (19 km) railroad line from Matawan to Freehold, New Jersey. Having been included on the list of most dangerous railroad crossings by the Automobile Club of America in 1908 the station and crossing were demolished in the 1970s. The rail station was on tracks formally owned by the Central Railroad of New Jersey. Currently, the Henry Hudson Trail uses this right of way and passes through Wickatunk.

=== Roads and highways ===
The major state road passing through the center of Wickatunk is Route 79. County Routes 3 and 520 also serve as major roads around Wickatunk.

== Points of interest ==
=== Old Scots Burying Ground ===
On the list of historic places, the town has a burial ground dating back to 1685. At that time the Presbyterians built the oldest Presbyterian church, starting with a crude structure of logs in 1692. By 1705 a refined church was reconstructed and by 1730 the congregation had grown and the church was removed to Freehold Township. Adjacent to the church was the Old Scots Burying Ground. The cemetery has at least 100 known graves. In 1895, seven hundred pilgrimages of the Presbyterian Synod came to the burial ground grave location of the first Pastor of the church (Rev. John Boyd) at Old Scots Cemetery to commemorate his life and the start of church at that location. A defining feature of the cemetery is the tall monument of Scottish and Vermont granite and Irish Graystone, surrounded by Scottish thistle carved in the granite With a 5-foot (1.5 m) spire which was lost in the 1950s. The spire was refurbished in 2002. The monument was erected in memory of Rev. John Boyd, the first pastor of the church. In 1915, The Presbyterian Synod added John Tennent's name to the monument.

=== Robert Collier Estate ===
In 1901, Robert J. Collier built his summer home in Wickatunk, bought from State Assemblyman John D. Honce. Used for many years as the location of personal parties and celebrations including the township Decoration Day celebrations, it was later donated and eventually became the Collier High School. Spanning many farms and properties, the area was also widely used for an annual fox hunt of the "Monmouth County Hounds" which started in East Freehold and ended at the Collier Estate.

=== General Store and Post Office ===
In the late 1920s, a general store and post office was constructed on Route 79. Passing through many hands since then it is currently a bike store. The Post Office obtained some notoriety when the Post mistress, Sadie S. Smock died in February 1928. Her husband "carried on the business for over a year" before an issue developed which brought a postal inspector who discovered the situation. William T. Smock was later sentenced to 60 days in jail for embezzling postal funds.

=== Yellowstone Buffalo ===
In the early 1900s, a buffalo brought from Yellowstone National Park by Richard W. Herbert was kept on his farm for all to see.

=== Marlboro Psychiatric Hospital ===
Starting in 1928, 509 acres (206 ha) were eventually purchased by the State of New Jersey. Some of the land was in Wickatunk for the construction of Marlboro Psychiatric Hospital. The hospital's original working name was "Hillsdale asylum at Wickatunk". It was later known as "The Hilldale Development" before becoming known as "Marlboro Psychiatric Hospital".

== Notable people ==
People who were born in, residents of, or otherwise closely associated with Wickatunk include:

- Robert J. Collier (1876–1918), editor of Collier's Weekly who owned the publishing company P.F. Collier & Son
- John Warne Herbert Jr. (1853–1934), lawyer and Rutgers football player in the first ever college football game
- John Warne Herbert Sr. (1820-1898), lawyer and politician
