= John Boyd (pastor) =

Reverend John Boyd (1679—August 30, 1708) was a Presbyterian minister in the United States. He was ordained the first pastor of Old Scot's Church, by the First Presbytery, which met in America on December 29, 1706. He was the first Presbyterian minister ordained in America. The event was described by the Rev. Hugh McCauley as "the small beginning of the great stream of organized American Presbyterianism". He was also the first pastor of Old Scot's Church. He was considered important to the Presbyterian history and the Synod of the Northeast placed a 25 foot monument in his honor at the Old Scots Burying Ground in 1900. His monument was restored by the Synod of the Northeast in 2002 and the top Spiral on the monument was replaced at that time.

== Early years ==
Rev. Boyd was born in Kilmarnock Scotland, which is the "ancient home of the Boyds". He likely grew up at this location with his brother Robert till he went to the University. He was educated in the fourth class of the University of Glasgow in Scotland. According to early Presbyterian histories, it is likely that the Reverend Boyd left Scotland with the leading Presbyterian ministers Francis McKemie and John Hampton in the fall of 1705.

== Death ==
Rev. Boyd died August 30, 1708, leaving no descendants at his death and no will. Peter Watson became the executor of his will by the Governor decree. Governor Richard Ingoldsby, "...granted letters of administration upon the estate of [Reverend] John Boyde (sic) of Monmouth County to Peter Watson." Records of the Presbytery, in a reference to his passing, state: "the Reverend John Boyd, being dead, what relates to him ceases".

== Original tombstone ==
The tombstone had actually been a table stone five feet in length, originally laid horizontally on a bed of stone and lime. The inscription on his gravestone, translated from the original Latin, reads:

"The ashes of the very pious Rev. John Boyd Pastor of this church of Calvin, are here buried, whose labour, although expended on a sterile soil, was not lost. They who knew him well also proved his worth who was at that time distinguished for his virtues. Reader, follow perseveringly his footsteps, and I hope thou wilt be happy. He died on the thirtieth day of August, one thousand, seven hundred and eight, in the twenty-ninth year of his age."

Historic Tombstone Removed: Freehold, N.J., December 29. A tombstone which marked the grave of the first pastor of Old Scot's CHurch, ordained 194 years ago today, has been removed from Old Scot's Cemetery, near this city and taken to Philadelphia, where it has been placed in the rooms of the Presbyterian Historical Society. It is of rough-hewn brownstone, about three feet high, two feet broad, and two inches thick. It marked the grave of Rev. John Boyd, Last spring a monument was unveiled over his grave, so the old tombstone become useless.

— Robesonian newspaper; Lumberton, North Carolina January 1, 1901, Page Three
