= Etnah Rochon Boutte =

American educator, pharmacist and clubwoman (1881–1973)

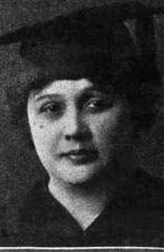
- Etnah Rochon Boutte, from a 1923 publication.
- Born: Etnah R. Rochon; 1881
- Died: 1973 (aged 91–92)
- Other name: Edna Rochon Boutte
- Occupations: educator, pharmacist, medical social worker
- Years active: 1917-1965
- Known for: Circle for Negro War Relief, National Council of Negro Women, cancer advocacy

Etnah Rochon Boutte (1881 – March 9, 1973) was an American educator, pharmacist, and clubwoman. She taught French at Fisk University and in New York City. She was executive secretary of the Circle for Negro War Relief during World War I.

== Early life ==
Etnah R. Rochon was from St. Martin Parish, Louisiana, the daughter of Victor Narcisse Rochon and Kate Rochon. Her mother was a teacher, and her father was a member of the Louisiana legislature during Reconstruction. She had three older sisters, including Althea Rochon, who went overseas as a YMCA worker during World War I. Another older sister, Beatrice Frances Rochon, married architect Robert Robinson Taylor; former government official Valerie Jarrett is the great-granddaughter of Beatrice Rochon Taylor.

(Etnah Rochon Boutte's first name is found as Etna or Edna in some sources, but she used the five-letter spelling in published advertisements for her school and in correspondence.)

== Education ==
Boutte attended Fisk University, but left during her senior year in 1917 to do war work. She petitioned later for her degree, with a letter of support from W. E. B. Du Bois. After the war, she attended Columbia University and studied a semester in Paris. She received a pharmacy degree in 1923 and a French teaching degree in 1924.

In 1928, John D. Rockefeller Jr. presented Boutte at Fisk's commencement with her belated degree, saying, "Here is a young woman who has a bachelor of science degree from Columbia and a master of arts degree from Columbia and the University of Paris, but she comes back to Fisk for her bachelor of arts degree, prizing it above all the others."

== Career ==
=== Education work ===
Boutte was a school teacher in Opelousas, Louisiana, and was a teacher educator in summer training programs. She taught French at Fisk University in Nashville, Tennessee. She taught French at New York's 137th Street YWCA in 1925, and opened her own school of French in Harlem in 1930. She was an officer of the New York Fisk Club, and a member of the Penelope Club in Brooklyn.

=== Wartime work ===
During World War I, while her husband was overseas as a member of John J. Pershing's staff, Boutte was executive secretary of the Circle for Negro War Relief, a national fundraising effort organized in New York City. During World War II she chaired the Manhattan chapter of the Free French Relief Committee.

=== Community and health advocacy ===
In 1922, Boutte was one of the sixteen women who founded the NAACP fundraising effort the Anti-Lynching Crusaders, in Newark, New Jersey, with Mary Burnett Talbert as director. In 1927 she was on the committee of the Emma Ransom House at the 137th Street YWCA. She was president of the New York Chapter of the National Council of Negro Women in 1944 and 1945.

After World War II, she worked with the American Cancer Society as a medical social work consultant, and ran "The Little Red Door", a cancer information center in Harlem. In 1952, she was a member of the New York City Cancer Committee Board. From 1943 into the 1960s, she was appointed to several terms on the Board of Visitors at the Warwick State Training School for Boys.

=== Boutte's Pharmacy ===
Boutte ran a pharmacy with her husband in New York for decades. In 1958 she survived an armed robbery while she was alone in the store.

== Personal life ==
In 1914, Boutte married pharmacist Mathieu (or Matthew) Virgil Boutte (or Boutté). In 1928, Boutte was in a serious traffic accident.

In 1957, Boutte's husband M. V. Boutte died.

On March 9, 1973, Boutte died. She was 92 years old. Boutte is buried with her husband at Arlington National Cemetery.
