= Benjamin F. Schreiber =

Benjamin F. Schreiber (April 25, 1885 – March 12, 1972) was a Jewish-American lawyer and judge from New York City.

== Life ==
Schreiber was born on April 25, 1885, in New York City, New York, the son of David Schreiber and Annie Bolog.

Schreiber graduated from Brooklyn Law School with an LL.B. and was admitted to the bar in 1906. In 1911, he became associated with Assemblyman James A. Foley. The association ended when Foley became Surrogate of New York County in 1920. In that year, he and William T. Collins organized the firm Schreiber and Collins, later known as Schreiber, Collins & Buchter. When Collins left the firm upon his appointment to the New York Supreme Court in 1929, the firm was renamed Schreiber, Myers & Buchter. He served as a first assistant District Attorney of New York County under Joab H. Banton for a year, during which time he conducted an investigation of bucket shops and presented evidence to grand juries, resulting in the indictment of numerous bucket shop owners. In 1923, he was appointed a deputy Attorney General of New York to conduct an investigation under the Martin Act regarding the issuance and sale of fraudulent securities. An active leader of the Democratic Party for decades, he served as president of the National Democratic Club from 1938 to 1939, after which he served as one of its governors.

Schreiber was campaign manager for Justice Burr in 1920, District Attorney Joab H. Banton in 1921, Justice Collins in 1922, Justice Donahue in 1923, and Mayor Jimmy Walker in 1925. During the 1924 presidential election, he was director of organization for the East in John W. Davis's presidential campaign. He again served as Mayor Walker's campaign manager in 1929 and was Royal S. Copeland's campaign manager in his last senatorial campaign. In March 1940, Governor Herbert H. Lehman appointed him Justice of the New York Supreme Court in the First Judicial District (New York County and the Bronx) to fill a vacancy caused by the death of Justice Alfred Frankenthaler. The New York State Senate confirmed the appointment a day later, and in April 1940 he was sworn in as Justice. At the end of his first day as Justice, he appointed former assistant Attorney General and future New York Supreme Court Justice Darwin W. Telesford his secretary, the first black person to be appointed to such a post. In November 1940, he was elected to a full fourteen-year term as Justice, and in December 1940 he was sworn in. He was re-elected Justice in 1954 with support from the Democratic Party, the Republican Party, and the Liberal Party. He retired as Justice in the end of 1955, after he reached the mandatory age limit of 70, and entered private law practice with the law firm Buchter, Ratheim, Abrams & Hoffman, where his son David was a member. By the time he died, he was with the law firm Maass, Levy, Friedman, & Weston.

Schreiber was president and honorary president of the Young Men's and Women's Hebrew Association of Washington Heights, a director of the New York Guild for the Jewish Blind, and a member of the Elks, the Knights of Pythias, the Freemasons, the American Jewish Congress, the New York County Lawyers' Association, the American Bar Association, the Broadmoor Country Club, the Chicopee Democratic Club, the New York State Bar Association, the New York City Bar Association, the Free Sons of Israel, the Metropolis Country Club, and the Manhattan Club. He attended Mt. Neboh Synagogue. In 1911, he married Mabel L. Lovey in Bayonne, New Jersey. Their children were David L. and Mrs. Eleanor Langerman.

Schreiber died at Lenox Hill Hospital on March 12, 1972.
