= Collier High School (New Jersey) =

Private high school in Monmouth County, New Jersey, US

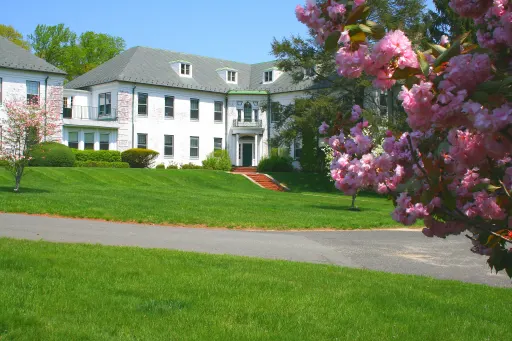

Location
- 160 Conover Road; Wickatunk, New Jersey 07765; United States
- Coordinates: 40.3639°N 74.2349°W

Information
- Type: Private, Day
- NCES School ID: A0701496
- Principal: Sarah Dodgson
- Faculty: NA FTEs
- Grades: 9-12
- Gender: coeducational
- Enrollment: 204 (as of 2023–24)
- Student to teacher ratio: NA
- Color: Green/Blue
- Website: www.collierhighschool.com

Collier High School is a private, nonsectarian high school located in the Wickatunk section of Marlboro Township, in Monmouth County, in the U.S. state of New Jersey. The school serves students with emotional difficulties and other special needs. The house and property were given to the Sisters of the Good Shepherd with the express purpose to create a residential program for girls with problem situations. The school was transferred to the sisters in 1927 by Sara Steward Collier-Van Allen, the widow of Robert J. Collier. Although privately operated by the Sisters of the Good Shepherd, the school receives a portion of its funding from public school districts which pay tuition for their students to be placed at Collier High School.

As of the 2023–24 school year, the school had an enrollment of 204 students.

== History ==
Originally called "St. Dorothy's School for Girls at Rest Hill" and envisioned as a girls' residential facility, the school now accepts both girls and boys.

In the agreement of property transfer, Mrs. Collier retained a suite in the house until her death in 1963 and kept close touch with the school and its needs.

The first capital improvement to the property was the addition of Smith Hall, a girls' dormitory. Next, a wing was added to the main house with a chapel and activity rooms. Then a separate school building was constructed.
