= Sales letter =

Type of formal business letter

A sales letter is a piece of direct mail which is designed to persuade the reader to purchase a particular product or service in the absence of a salesman or saleswoman . It has been defined as "A form of direct mail in which an advertiser sends a letter to a potential customer." It is distinct from other direct mail techniques, such as the distribution of leaflets and catalogues, as the sales letter typically sells a single product or product line, and further tends to be mainly textual as opposed to graphics-based, although video sales letters have become increasingly popular. It is typically used for products or services which, due to their price, are a considered purchase at medium or high value (typically tens to thousands of dollars). A sales letter is often, but not exclusively, the last stage of the sales process before the customer places an order, and is designed to ensure that the prospect is committed to becoming a customer.

Since the advent of the internet, the sales letter has become an integral part of internet marketing, and typically takes the form of an email or webpage. Unsolicited sales emails are known as spam, although spam typically consists of emails which are much shorter than a normal sales letter. Offline, unsolicited sales letters are known as junk mail.

== Development of sales letters ==
Because of the direct response nature of sales letters, they can be carefully tested on an ongoing basis to determine which version performs best in terms of converting readers to customers. Sales letters are typically developed incrementally, with split testing of various elements. This allows the marketeer or copywriter to confirm which headline, body text or graphic design converts best. On the internet, it is possible to track additional variables, such as the open rate of emails, the bounce rate, clickthrough to the checkout, etc.
