= Nathaniel Scudder =

American Founding Father and politician

4th President of the Medical Society of New Jersey
- In office 1770–1771
- Preceded by: John Cochran
- Succeeded by: Isaac Smith

Personal details
- Born: May 10, 1733 Freehold Borough, New Jersey, British America
- Died: October 17, 1781 (aged 48) Shrewsbury, New Jersey, U.S.

Nathaniel Scudder (May 10, 1733 – October 17, 1781) was an American Founding Father, physician, and officer during the American Revolutionary War. He served as a delegate for New Jersey to the Continental Congress, where he was one of two delegates from New Jersey to sign the Articles of Confederation.

== Biography ==
Scudder was born in Monmouth Court House, Province of New Jersey, which later became Freehold Borough, New Jersey. He attended the College Of New Jersey (now Princeton University) and graduated in 1751. He then studied medicine before setting up a practice in Monmouth County, New Jersey.

Dr. Scudder was active in civic and militia affairs. When the revolution split the colonies, he supported the rebel cause. He was a member of the county's committee of safety and represented it in the Provincial Congress held in 1774. That same year he was named lieutenant colonel in the county's first regiment of militia. In 1776 he was elected to a one-year term as Monmouth County's first member of the newly constituted New Jersey Legislative Council, and in 1780 he was elected to the New Jersey General Assembly.

In 1777, Scudder became the colonel of his militia regiment and was sent as a delegate to the Continental Congress. During the summer of 1778, he was particularly busy and abandoned his medical practice. He split his time between the Congress and militia activities. He led his regiment in the Battle of Monmouth in June. He wrote a series of impassioned letters to local and state leaders urging the adoption of the Articles of Confederation, and when New Jersey's legislature approved them in November, he endorsed them for the state at the Congress.

Scudder continued both forms of service for several years. On October 17, 1781, he led a part of his regiment to offer resistance to a British Army foraging party and was killed in a skirmish near Shrewsbury, New Jersey. He is buried in the Old Tennent Cemetery in Manalapan Township. Dr. Scudder was the only member of the Continental Congress to die in battle during the Revolutionary War and the last colonel to die in battle.
