= Old Burying Ground (Littleton, Massachusetts) =

Historic cemetery in Massachusetts, United States

- U.S. National Register of Historic Places
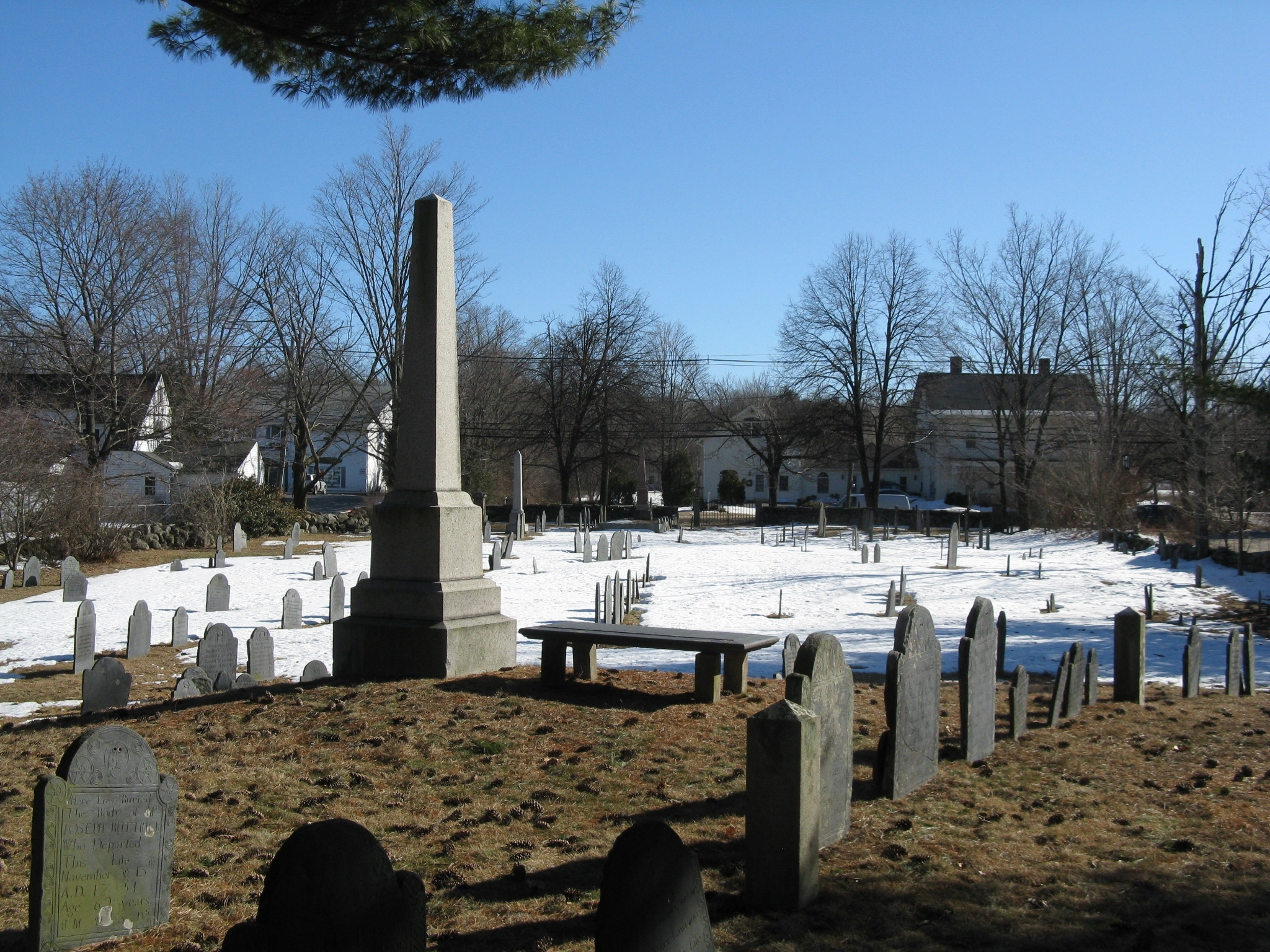
- Old Burying Ground

- Location within Massachusetts Location within the United States
- Location: King Street at Little Common, Littleton, Massachusetts
- Coordinates: 42.5452396°N 71.4766297°W
- Area: 1.25 acres (0.51 ha)
- Built: 1721
- NRHP reference No.: 01001560
- Added to NRHP: February 5, 2002

The Old Burying Ground is a historic cemetery on King Street near the junction with White Street in Littleton, Massachusetts. Established in 1721, it was the town's first formal burying ground, and the only one for about one hundred years. The cemetery has 340 grave markers, dating from 1721 to 1909, although documentary evidence exists for more burials. It is a long, narrow strip of land, in which the graves are arrayed in a roughly rectilinear fashion, with older graves near the front and newer ones in the back.

The cemetery was listed on the National Register of Historic Places in 2002.

== See also ==
- National Register of Historic Places listings in Middlesex County, Massachusetts
