= Synod of the Northeast =

Synod of the Northeast is an upper judicatory of the Presbyterian Church (USA) based in East Syracuse, New York. The synod oversees 19 presbyteries in six New England states (Maine, New Hampshire, Vermont, Massachusetts, Rhode Island, and Connecticut), two of the three Mid-Atlantic States (New Jersey and New York), plus a non-geographical Korean Presbytery.

== History ==
The Synod of the Northeast was founded in May 1973, when the General Assembly decided to reorganize its synods on a regional basis. The merger included the following state synods:

- The Synod of New Jersey was established in 1824, when the Presbytery of Jersey was divided into the presbyteries of Newark and Elizabeth Town.
- The Synod of New York
- Synod of New England

== Presbyteries of the Synod of the Northeast ==
There are 19 presbyteries in the synod, and 930 faith communities.
