= Kurzman =

Kurzman is a surname. Notable people with the surname include:

- Charles Kurzman (born 1963), American sociologist;
- Dan Kurzman (1922–2010), American journalist and writer of military history books.
