= Hal Boyle =

American newspaper journalist (1911–1974)

Harold Vincent "Hal" Boyle (July 24, 1911 – April 1, 1974) was a prolific, Pulitzer-prize-winning journalist for the Associated Press. During 30 years with the AP, Boyle wrote 7,680 columns. He is best known for his work as a war correspondent during World War II. He was consistently closer to the front lines in the European and Pacific theatres of operation than other correspondents. His column became a staple in over 700 newspapers. He is also the namesake of a prize given annually to reporters by the Oversees Press Club of America, for the best newspaper or wire service reporting from abroad.

== Background ==
Boyle was born in Kansas City, Missouri, on July 24, 1911, the son of butcher Peter E. Boyle and his wife Margarit, an Irish immigrant farm girl.

He married Mary Francis Boyle in 1937.

Boyle began his newspaperwork as a copy boy in Kansas City's AP Bureau in 1928. After attending the Junior College of Kansas City, he studied journalism at the University of Missouri, graduating with distinction in 1932. After working in the AP's St. Louis bureau, he moved to New York in 1936. By the time the United States entered World War II, Boyle had become an assistant city editor with the AP.

== Journalism ==
Boyle received the Pulitzer Prize on May 7, 1945, for his "distinguished correspondence" from the war during 1944. In 1951, the Veterans of Foreign Wars awarded him the Omar Bradley Award, given for the most distinguished contribution to national security, for his coverage of the Korean War.

Boyle portrayed himself in the 1945 film dramatization of Ernie Pyle's book, The Story of G.I. Joe.

In 1951, Boyle contributed a section to a Collier's Weekly special publication entitled Preview of the War We Do Not Want. Consistent with the book's purpose to depict the effects of a hypothetical future war with another nuclear power, Boyle's piece (entitled "Washington Under the Bomb") described, in the form of a news story, the aftermath of dropping one nuclear bomb on Washington D.C.

In 1969 the Associated Press published Help, Help! Another Day!: The World of Hal Boyle.

== Death and legacy ==
Boyle died of a heart attack at his home in New York City on April 1, 1974. His death came four months after being diagnosed with "Lou Gehrig's disease" (amytrophic lateral sclerosis). He was buried in Kansas City.

In 1980, a selected set of his columns and articles were republished in The Best of Boyle.

The Hal Boyle Award has been awarded by the Overseas Press Club for "Best newspaper or news service reporting from abroad" since 1977.
