= Herbert Gentry =

American painter (1919–2003)

- Born: July 17, 1919; Pittsburgh, Pennsylvania, U.S.
- Died: September 8, 2003 (aged 84); Stockholm, Sweden
- Occupations: Artist, Painter

Herbert Alexander Gentry (July 17, 1919 – September 8, 2003) was an African-American Expressionist painter who lived and worked in Paris, France (1946–70; 1976–80), Copenhagen, Denmark (1958–63), in the Swedish cities of Gothenburg (1963–65), Stockholm (1965–76; 2001–03), and Malmö (1980–2001), and in New York City (1970–2000) as a permanent resident of the Hotel Chelsea.

== The art of Herbert Gentry ==
Gentry's paintings juxtapose faces and masks, shifting orientations of figures and heads—human and animal—into profiles, to the left, to the right, above and below. The direction of the head, as face or profile, leading right or left, or facing front, is played against the relative scale of each head, its position on the canvas, and in relationship to the others.

Herbert Gentry painting in Falsterbo, August 1990

The faces evoke subtle expressions and moods. Rather than using images to depict a concrete story, Gentry releases his experiences upon the canvas. The act of spontaneous painting uses consciousness itself, and each painting reveals the self. When asked about direct influences, he avoids imposing external meanings upon primary experience, describing instead his creative process.

Philosophically near the jazz musician, Gentry breathes rhythms into a personally inflected expressionism. "The staccato beat of jazz is fused with biomorphic form in paintings which never become totally abstract but hold the picture plane in the Cubist tradition," wrote art historian Peter Selz (1994) about Gentry's work. Gentry creates a foil for feelings and for emotion, and orchestrates his subjective figuration in dialogue with the immediacy of the painted gesture. Romare Bearden (1981) wrote that Gentry's "method is conceptual rather than realistic. One senses in the chromatic emotionalism, and in the biomorphic forms of the figures that often appear in Gentry's paintings, the strong pull of the unconscious."

== Biography ==
=== Harlem Renaissance childhood ===
Herbert Alexander Gentry was born in Pittsburgh, Pennsylvania, on July 17, 1919. He was the son of James Jentry of Madison Courthouse, Virginia, and Violet Howden of Kingston, Jamaica. By 1924 Gentry was living in Harlem, New York City, with his mother and her family.

The Harlem Renaissance provided the backdrop for Gentry's childhood. His mother worked as a dancer and actress. His home was frequently visited by artists, musicians and dancers. Under the name Teresa Gentry, she danced in the chorus with Josephine Baker and Bessye Buchanen. Later, she was in the cast of the original rendition of the Ziegfeld musical Show Boat in 1927, as well as its revival in 1932. His mother's friends included Langston Hughes, Paul Robeson and Duke Ellington.

As a youngster Gentry had a role in the play Scarlet Sister Mary, which toured the country with actress Ethel Barrymore and opened on Broadway in 1931. Gentry took inspiration from artists, musicians, writers, dancers, and actors, all of whom reinforced his belief in the creative world that lay beyond Harlem.

Educated in the New York City public schools, Gentry attended Cooper Junior High and George Washington High School. He pursued drawing in school took art classes at the Harlem YMCA and later studied art as part of the under the Federal Art Project of the WPA (Works Progress Administration) at Roosevelt High School.

In 1939, the leadership of Harlem protest demonstrations against employment discrimination is said to have included besides Rev. Adam Clayton Powell Jr. Gentry's older cousin Arnold P. Johnson. Protester Gentry, who was studying business at New York University, is said to have been Consolidated Edison New York's first Black employee in a white-collar position and to have tolerated being told by company directors to the effect that, "If you do well, we'll hire others."

He served in the U.S. Army (1942–45), serving in the 90th Coast Guard Artillery / Anti-Aircraft Regiment working in Special Services. His U.S. Army Service in World War II took him to different countries in the Mediterranean and Northern Europe: Morocco, Algeria, Madeline Island (Italy), Corsica, Marseilles, Paris, Alsace-Lorraine (France), and Salzburg (Austria). At the end of the war, Gentry was stationed in the Paris suburb of Crepy-en-Vallois. He took every opportunity to visit Paris.

=== The expatriate years ===
==== Paris, 1946–58 ====
The center of the Art World before World War II, Paris still held that title in 1946. Paris touched other memories for ex-soldier Gentry, who as a youth had heard many of his mother's friends speak of their travel and performances in Paris. Home in Harlem after his discharge from the Army, he wanted to study art in Paris. Not waiting for the administration of the GI Bill to be organized in Paris, and warned that the basic amenities were still rationed, Gentry arrived for the Fall 1946 academic term.

Gentry was included in the first group of G.I. Bill students that arrived in Paris in 1946. Within his first year, he had a dormitory in the Cité Universitaire, but later relocated to a small room at the Montparnasse hotels. Alongside drawing and painting courses, Gentry also managed to complete a Civilization course."Biography". Herbert Gentry.

American veteran art students Costa Alex, Richard Deane Taylor, and Herbert Gentry standing in a bread-ration line in Paris, c. 1947. The photograph was published in UN World, January 1948, in the feature “Young Americans on the Left Bank again.”

His first year back in Paris, Gentry resided at the American House at the Cité Internationale Universitaire de Paris, where he met fellow American students: sculptor Kosta Alex, pianist Julian Ketcham, illustrator Richard Deane Taylor, and writers Marc Behm and Dan Kurzman. Moving beyond student circles, he sought out author Richard Wright, who encouraged him in his art; he got to know writer James Baldwin.

Gentry studied French at the Alliance Française, and was enrolled at the Ecole des Hautes Etudes Sociales. Académie de la Grande Chaumière had an approach to art teaching that matched his need for freedom. He spent three years studying with Ossip Zadkine and French painter Yves Brayer. By 1949 Gentry was teaching visiting Americans at the Académie de la Grande Chaumière and had his first solo Parisian exhibition at Galerie de Seine.

Gentry lived the café life in Montparnasse, meeting his fellow American artists at Le Dôme Café, Le Select café and La Coupole: sculptors Shinkichi Tajiri, Kosta Alex, and Harold Cousins, painters Herbie Katzman, John Hultberg, Burt Hasen, Haywood "Bill" Rivers, Sam Francis, Avel DeKnight, and painter-filmmaker Carmen D'Avino; as ex-GIs, students and young artists, they casually rubbed shoulders with the greats such as Alberto Giacometti and Georges Braque. There were many others, including Jimmy "Loverman" Davis, Romare Bearden, Serge Charchoune, George Spaventa, Corneille, Wifredo Lam, and Jean Cocteau.

Between 1948 and 1951, Gentry opened Chez Honey, a club-galerie in Montparnasse, an exhibition space by day and a jazz club by night. Featuring his first wife, Tadea Werfelman, known as Honey Johnson, a singer who had come to Europe with Rex Stewart's Band, the club was known as the place to hear modern jazz. Pete Matz accompanied on piano, as would Dick Allen, Art Simmons and Don Byas. The club attracted an international crowd. Patrons included Jean-Paul Sartre, Simone de Beauvoir, Juliette Gréco, Eartha Kitt, Orson Welles, Jean-Louis Barrault, and Marcel Marceau. Painter Larry Rivers, who arrived in 1950, jammed with the professional musicians.

In November 1951 Gentry left for New York. Later, in 1953 he returned to Paris on the same boat as two painters who would become important friends: Beauford Delaney and Larry Potter. No longer on the GI Bill, Gentry got work in Paris jazz clubs; by 1955 he was arranging entertainment shows for the Allied and American Armed Forces in France and Germany. He met many American musicians and dancers, including Mary Lou Williams, Maya Angelou, and others in Paris such as Art Buchwald and Moune de Rivel(fr). He studied privately with painter Georges Braque. Active in Parisian café life, he and Larry Potter congregated with African-American writers Chester Himes, Ollie Harrington, among others at the Café Tournon; Gentry socialized with visual artists at café Le Select and La Coupole in Montparnasse, where he also met the Dutch, Belgian and Scandinavian artists of the COBRA-group: Ejler Bille, Robert Jacobsen, Karel Appel, Carl-Henning Pedersen, Bram Bogart, and Guillaume Cornelis van Beverloo (aka Corneille). Gentry accepted the opportunity to exhibit at Galerie Hybler in Copenhagen in 1959, and relocated to Copenhagen to prepare.

==== Copenhagen, 1958–62 ====
Copenhagen was an important jazz capital in Europe, and hosted a lively African-American community of musicians and artists. After his successful solo exhibition at Galerie Hybler, Gentry remained in Copenhagen to prepare for a series of solo exhibitions in Northern Europe, in Denmark, Sweden, Switzerland, and Netherlands. He was soon exhibiting paintings in galleries across Northern Europe. While associating Gentry's paintings with art of the COBRA movement, Danish critics Jen Jorgen Thorsen and Uffe Harder declared his work distinctly American.

Over the next five years Gentry had solo exhibitions at Galerie Suzanne Bollag, Zurich, 1959; Galerie Die Insel, Hamburg, 1960; Kunstudstillningsbygning, Odense, DK, 1960; Galerie Aestetica, Stockholm, SE, 1960; Galerie Perron, Geneva, 1961; Galerie Passpartout, Copenhagen, 1961, 1963; Galerie Leger, Malmö, 1962; Galerie Rudolph Meier, Davos, 1962. He was invited to exhibit at Den Frie, Copenhagen, in 1960 with the group 6 + 2; in 1964 at Den Frie Gentry was included in "10 American Negro Artists" with Harvey Cropper, Beauford Delaney, Clifford Jackson, Sam Middleton, Larry Potter, Walter Williams, and others.

==== Stockholm, 1963–76 ====
Gentry moved to Gothenburg, Sweden in 1963, and had relocated to Stockholm by 1965. In Sweden he developed friendships with sculptors Torsten Rehnqvist and Willy Gordon, and painters Bengt Lindström, and Gösta Werner. Important solo exhibitions included Galerie Doktor Glas, Stockholm, 1967; Galerie Marya, Copenhagen, 1967; Galerie Zodiaque, Brussels, 1967 and Vikingsborg Museum, Helsingborg, 1966.

While living in Scandinavia, Gentry kept a studio in Paris through 1980. His dedication to mobility differentiated Gentry from most of his fellow American expatriates. He followed the model of artists like Cuban Surrealist Wifredo Lam, who kept studios in more than one country. Montparnasse in Paris remained a central hub for the European art world.

In Stockholm in 1975 Gentry was honored with a retrospective exhibition at the Royal Swedish Academy of Arts, which traveled to Norrköpings Museum, and Amos Andersson Museum in Helsinki, Finland.

==== Paris, 1976–80 ====
Gentry was awarded a studio at the Cité internationale des arts in Paris and worked there for four years. During this period he experimented, working in acrylic on raw linen. While studying in Paris, he was mentored under Georges Baroque and found an interest in modernist ideas of Cubism and Expressionism. He became acquainted with members of the CoBrA group who introduced him to ideas of automatism and the concept of the artist as an inherently social being. He befriended many artists he met at the Cité: Mordecai Ardon, Gerald Jackson, Francisca Lindberg, Christine O'Loughlin, Vicente Pimentel, Mary Anne Rose, Grace Renzi, and Ulla Waller. He had solo exhibitions in the United States and Sweden: Randall Gallery, NYC, 1978; Fabien Carlsson Gallery, Gothenburg, Sweden, 1977; Montclair State College, Montclair, New Jersey, 1977.

==== Malmö, Sweden, 1980–2003 ====
In later years, he worked less in France and spent more time in New York City. He returned to Sweden and established his studio in Malmö across the Øresund from Copenhagen. He enjoyed its slower pace, milder climate and location near the continent. He reconnected with old friends in Copenhagen. He prepared paintings and prints for gallery exhibitions in Sweden, as well as in Copenhagen, Milan, Amsterdam, and other continental cities. Artist friendships from this period included Uno Svensson and Olle Bonnier. Between 1981 and 1993 he had numerous solo exhibitions in Europe and Scandinavia: Galerie Futura, Stockholm, 1993, 1989; Ragnarpers, Gärsnäs, SE, 1993; Falsterbo Konsthall, Falsterbo, SE, 1992; Lilla Galleriet, Helsingborg, SE, 1992, 1985; Gallerihuset, Copenhagen, DK, 1991; Bülowska Gallery, Malmö, 1991, 1987; Gallery Altes Rathaus, Inzlingen (Basel), DE, 1990; Gooijer Fine Arts, Amsterdam, NE, 1985; Galleria del Naviglio, Milan, Italy, 1984; Biblioteca Comunale di Milano, Milan, 1984; Gallery Asbæk, Copenhagen, DK, 1983; Galerie Oscar, Stockholm, 1981.

=== Home in New York, 1969–2003 ===
In 1971, Moderna Museet Director Pontus Hulten recommended the Chelsea Hotel as an ideal residence for Gentry and his family to take an apartment for a year's stay in New York City. Welcomed by hotel manager Stanley Bard, Gentry discovered a number of artist colleagues from Paris already living and working there. An ideal fit, having a home in New York made it possible for Gentry to return many times and be active in the New York art world. He had exhibitions at Andre Zarre Gallery (New York), 1974 and Selma Burke Art Center, Carnegie Institute (Pittsburgh, Pennsylvania), 1972. Gentry became a "permanent resident" of the Chelsea Hotel in 1982. He renewed old artistic friendships: Romare Bearden, Ed Clark, Bill Hutson, and Robert Blackburn, and made new ones.

Between 1975 and 1995, Gentry's creative production was fueled by mobility. He was in continuous movement, traveling several times a year. He commuted between New York and Paris (or Sweden), while he established an artistic reputation in the United States. During this period he showed in Europe as an American artist, while in the United States he was exhibited as an African-American artist.

Beginning in 1987, Gentry had many one-person exhibitions in the United States: Alitash Kebede Gallery, Los Angeles, California, 1987, 1994, 2004; Quick Art Center, St. Bonaventure University, Olean, New York, 1995; Stella Jones Gallery, New Orleans, Louisiana, 1998; Stella Jones Gallery, New Orleans, Louisiana, 1998; Molloy College, Rockville Centre, New York, 2000; and Macy Gallery, Teachers College, Columbia University, New York, 2000; Steve Turner Gallery, Beverly Hills, California, 2002; Parish Gallery, Georgetown, Washington, D.C., 2003. He had nine solo shows at G. R. N’Namdi Gallery between 1991 and 2008: in New York, 2003, 2008; in Chicago, Illinois, 1998, 2000, 2004; in Detroit, Michigan, 2003; and Birmingham, Michigan, 1991, 1996, 1999.

Two significant exhibitions—organized by and exhibited at the Studio Museum in Harlem—were "An Ocean Apart" in 1982, and "Explorations in the City of Light" (1996), which traveled to Chicago Cultural Center, Milwaukee Museum of Art, Fort Worth Art Museum and New Orleans Museum of Art.

Important retrospective exhibitions since the artist's death in 2003 include: "Herbert Gentry: Moved by Music," Wadsworth Atheneum, Amistad Center for Art and Culture, Hartford, Connecticut, 2006; "Herbert Gentry: the Man the Magic the Master," James E. Lewis Museum at Morgan State University in Baltimore, Maryland, 2007; "Herbert Gentry: the Man the Magic the Master", Diggs Gallery, Winston-Salem State University, North Carolina, 2008; "Herbert Gentry: Facing Other Ways," Rush Rhees Library Rare Books and Special Collections, University of Rochester, Rochester, New York, 2007; "Face to Face," Phillips Museum of Art, Franklin & Marshall College, Lancaster, Pennsylvania, 2005. The Smithsonian American Art Museum holds pieces including, "Our City," L'Homme Vert," "Ici," Meeting Series "B": Our Lives," "Faced Faces," and "La Rose."

== Selected collections ==
Gentry's work is in the collections of the Metropolitan Museum of Art (New York); the American Art Museum and Hirshhorn Museum (Smithsonian , Washington, D.C.); the Studio Museum in Harlem (New York); the Masur Museum (Monroe, Louisiana); the Wadsworth Atheneum Museum of Art and the Amistad Center for Art and Culture (Hartford, Connecticut); the Dayton Art Institute (Dayton, Ohio); and the Brooklyn Museum (Brooklyn, New York). In Europe and beyond, his work is collected by the Moderna Museet (Stockholm, Sweden), Norrköpings Art Museum (Norrköping, Sweden), Stedelijk Museum (Amsterdam, Netherlands), National Gallery of Modern Art (New Delhi, India) and Bibliothèque Nationale de Paris (France), as well as many private collections.

== See also ==
- Avel de Knight
