= Richard M. Langworth =

American author (1941–2025)

Richard M. Langworth CBE (1941 – February 20, 2025) was an American author who was based in Moultonborough, New Hampshire, United States, and Eleuthera, Bahamas, who specialised in automotive history and Winston Churchill. He was editor of The Packard Cormorant from 1975 to 2001 and was a Trustee of the Packard Motorcar Foundation in Detroit, Michigan. His works have won awards from the Antique Automobile Club of America, Society of Automotive Historians, Old Cars Weekly, Packard Club and Graphic Arts Association of New Hampshire.

Langworth was also author or editor of A Connoisseur's Guide to the Books of Sir Winston Churchill, Churchill in His Own Words, Churchill By Himself, and nine other books about Churchill. Langworth founded the Churchill Study Unit (1968) and served as the president of its successors the International Churchill Society and the Churchill Centre (1988–1999) and chairman of its board of trustees (2000–2006). He was editor of the Churchill journal "Finest Hour" from 1982 to 2014 and editorial consultant to the National Churchill Museum (2011–2015). From 2014 to 2025, he was a Senior Fellow for the Churchill Project at Hillsdale College. In 1998, he was created a Commander of the Most Excellent Order of the British Empire (CBE) by Elizabeth II for his services to Anglo-American understanding and history. Richard died on February 20, 2025, at the age of 83.

== Books ==
The following books are listed by the Gale Literary Database and represent a partial listing (not counting magazine and journal contributions) of Langworth's major works:

- (Editor) The World of Cars, Dutton, 1971.
- (Co-author with Beverly Rae Kimes) Oldsmobile: The First 75 Years, Automobile Quarterly, 1972.
- Fifty Years of Triumph, Automobile Quarterly, 1973.
- Kaiser-Frazer: Last Onslaught on Detroit, Dutton, 1975.
- Chrysler & Imperial: The Postwar Years, Motorbooks, 1976.
- Hudson: The Postwar Years, Motorbooks, 1977.
- Studebaker: The Postwar Years, Motorbooks, 1978.
- (Co-author with Graham Robson) Triumph Cars, a History, Motor Racing Publishers, 1978, rep. 1998.
- (Publisher) Pat Chappell, The Hot One: Chevrolet 1955–57, Dragonwyck Publishing (NH), 1978.
- The Thunderbird Story: Personal Luxury, Motorbooks International (Osceola, WI), 1980.
- Tiger, Alpine, Rapier: Sporting Cars From the Rootes Group, Osprey (London, England), 1982.
- Porsche, a Tradition of Greatness (Consumer Guide/Beekman (New York), 1983.
- The Studebaker Century: A National Heritage, (With Asa E. Hall), Dragonwyck Publishing (NH), 1983.
- Chevrolet 1911–1985, (With Jan P. Norbye), Consumer Guide/Beekman (New York), 1984.
- Encyclopedia of American Cars, 1930–1980, Consumer Guide/Beekman (New York), 1984.
- Mercedes-Benz: The First Hundred Years, Consumer Guide/Beekman (New York), 1984.
- The Mustangs, 1964–1973: A Collector's Guide, Motor Racing Publications (London, England), 1984.
- History of Chrysler Corporation, 1924–1985, (With Jan Norbye) Beekman (New York), 1985.
- History of General Motors 1908–1986, (With Jan Norbye) Publications Intl. (Skokie, IL), 1986.
- Illustrated Cadillac Buyer's Guide, Motorbooks International (Osceola, WI), 1986.
- The Complete Book of Corvette, Consumer Guide/Beekman (New York), 1987.
- Illustrated Oldsmobile Buyer's Guide, Motorbooks International (Osceola, WI), 1987.
- Complete Book of Collectible Cars, (With Graham Robson) Publications Intl. (Skokie, IL), 1987.
- The Great American Convertible, Consumer Guide/Beekman (New York), 1988.
- Illustrated Buick Buyer's Guide, Motorbooks International (Osceola, WI), 1988.
- Great American Automobiles of the 50s, Consumer Guide/Beekman (New York), 1989.
- Illustrated Packard Buyer's Guide, Motorbooks International (Osceola, WI), 1991.
- (Publisher) 'Winston S. Churchill's "India" (1931), First American Edition, Dragonwyck Publishing (NH), 1991.
- Illustrated Studebaker Buyer's Guide, Motorbooks International (Osceola, WI), 1991.
- Chrysler & Imperial: The Classic Postwar Years, Motorbooks International (Osceola, WI), 1993.
- Hudson, 1946–1957, Motorbooks International (Osceola, WI), 1993.
- Studebaker, 1946–1966, Motorbooks International (Osceola, WI), 1993.
- Complete Book of Collectible Cars: Revised & Extended, Publications Intl. (Lincolnwood, IL), 1994.
- Illustrated Dodge Buyer's Guide, Motorbooks International (Osceola, WI), 1995.
- Great Cars of the 20th Century, (With Arch Brown, Publications Intl. (Lincolnwood, IL), 1998.
- Connoisseur's Guide to the Books of Sir Winston Churchill, Brassey's (London, England), 1998, 2001.
- (Editor) Churchill by Himself, Ebury Press (London, England), Public Affairs (New York) 2008, cover portrait of Winston Churchill by Richard Deane Taylor, Rosetta Books 2013
- General Motors: 100 Years, Publications Intl. (Lincolnwood, IL), 2008
- (Editor) The Definitive Wit of Winston Churchill, Ebury Press (London, England), Public Affairs (New York), 2009
- (Editor) The Patriot's Churchill: An Inspiring Collection of His Finest Words, Ebury Press (London, England), 2010.
- (Editor) All Will Be Well: Good Advice from Winston Churchill, Ebury Press (London, England), 2011.
- (Editor) Churchill in His Own Words, Ebury Press (London, England), 2012.
- (Editor & co-author) The Churchill Companion: A Concise Guide Churchill Centre (Chicago, IL), 2012. Cover portrait of Winston Churchill by Richard Deane Taylor.
- "Churchill and the Avoidable War: Could World War II have been Prevented?", Kindle Single & Dragonwyck Publishing (NH), 2015.
- Winston Churchill, Myth and Reality: What He Actually Said and Did, McFarland & Company Inc (Jefferson, NC), 2017

== Sources ==
- Biography and Genealogy Master Index 1980– 2006. Thomson Gale & Associates.

Farmington Hills, Michigan.

- Gale Literary Databases, Thomas Gale & Associates, Farmington Hills, Michigan
- The author.
