= Preview of the War We Do Not Want =

1951 Collier's Magazine special edition

“Preview of the War We Do Not Want — An Imaginary Account of Russia’s Defeat and Occupation, 1952–60” is the title of the principal subject-article of the Collier's magazine issue of 27 October 1951, which was composed of narrative-fiction articles about the political and military actions that provoke a Third World War (1952–1955) between the United Nations (UN) and the USSR. After four years of global warfare, the UN militaries defeat the USSR with many nuclear bombings of the cities and industries of the country. Moreover, the UN's atomic bombings of the cities, towns, and countryside of the USSR do not cause a nuclear winter, yield little ionizing radiation, and produce little radioactive fallout, which are the apocalyptic environmental consequences mathematically predicted in real military scenarios for fighting a nuclear war.

Preview of the War We Do Not Want, Richard Deane Taylor painted the cover for the October 27, 1951 issue of Collier's

At Collier's editorial office, the fictional project about an anti-communist atomic war was codenamed “Operation Eggnog” and was managed by the associate editor, Cornelius Ryan. For that special-subject issue of the magazine, “Preview of the War We Do Not Want”, the publisher of Collier's increased the print run by 500,000 copies, from 3,400,000 to 3,900,000 copies of the magazine. Among the twenty writers who contributed fiction about the imaginary third world war between the UN and USSR, were the anti–Communist intellectual Arthur Koestler, the writer Philip Wylie, the newspaper columnist Walter Winchell, and the war correspondents Hal Boyle, Marguerite Higgins, and Edward R. Murrow. The cover of the magazine was painted by Richard Deane Taylor.

== Plot ==
Chronology of the atomic war between the United Nations and Russia (1952–1955)

In May 1952, the Soviet Ground Forces (Soviet Army) and Warsaw Pact military forces invade and occupy the Socialist Federal Republic of Yugoslavia in support of a factional armed revolt against the head-of-state Tito, the revolt was instigated by secret agents of the Communist International (COMINTERN). Upon the Soviet government's refusal to withdraw the Soviet occupation army from Socialist Yugoslavia, the United States and the principal military powers of the United Nations jointly declare war against the USSR. The US then drops atomic bombs upon strategic industrial complexes throughout the USSR. Consequently, Soviet armies invade and occupy West Germany in central Europe, the petroleum countries of the Middle East in south-west Asia, and the US state of Alaska, in the Pacific Ocean region of North America. Outnumbered by the Soviet armies, the US military forces fight defensively to realise a strategic retreat from every theatre of war; likewise, in east Asia, the US withdraws American military forces from the south of Korea and from Japan. The third world war continues when the USSR drops atomic bombs upon the cities of London, Detroit, and New York, and also bombs and destroys the nuclear-materials production complex at the Hanford Site in Washington state.

In 1953, the USSR realizes a second atomic bombing of American cities, however, the US government's civil defense programs limit the numbers of American civilian casualties and dead to fewer than the deaths incurred from the Soviets’ first atomic bombing of the continental United States. Meanwhile, the rested, rearmed, and regrouped militaries of the United Nations counterattack and expel the Soviet armies of occupation in the European and Asian theatres of war.

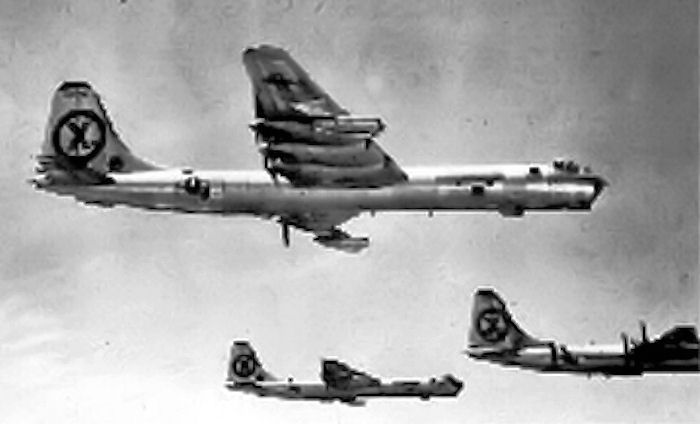
In the fictional “Preview of the War We Do Not Want” (1951), to avenge the Soviet incineration of the US capital city of Washington, D.C., on 22 July 1952, a flight of US Air Force B-36 Peacemaker aeroplanes incinerates the city of Moscow with atomic bombs.

To avenge the atomic incineration of the American capital city of Washington, D.C., on 22 July 1952, a flight of USAF B-36 bombers drop atomic bombs upon Moscow. The incineration of the USSR's capital city is witnessed and reported by the war correspondent Edward R. Murrow. Afterwards, the US government deploys psychological warfare against the racially and ethnically heterogeneous populations of the republics comprised by the USSR. The American propaganda justifies the Western armed invasion and military occupation of the USSR by claiming that the occupation armies of the United Nations are fighting the Soviet army in order to liberate all the Russias from Soviet Communism.

In the course of the military occupation of the USSR, of Russia, and of the Warsaw Pact satellite countries, the UN militarily supports the anti-communist guerrillas of each country to overthrow the Communist national government of their respective soviet republic. Moreover, to definitively disarm the USSR of nuclear weapons, the US deploys a suicide-mission task force of 10,000 US Army parachute soldiers to destroy stocks of atomic bombs hidden in the Ural Mountains of the USSR; elsewhere, anti-communist Yugoslav guerrillas continually harass the Soviet army of occupation that began World War III in the spring of 1952.

In 1954, the secret policeman Lavrentiy Beriya assumed leadership of the USSR, whilst chairman Stalin no longer figured in the political sphere. As head of the Soviet state, Beriya continually confronts and quells armed revolts by anti-communists throughout the USSR and the socialist countries of the Warsaw Pact. In the occupied west of Europe, the UN militaries confront and expel the Soviet armies of occupation; by the end of 1954, the military forces of the UN reached the city limits of Warsaw, in the People's Republic of Poland, and reached the Ukrainian Soviet Socialist Republic, at the European border of the USSR. Elsewhere, the combined militaries of the UN rout the Soviet army in Turkey, capture the Crimea in the Ukrainian south, and the US Marines seized the port city of Vladivostok, in far-eastern Russia. The Western military occupation of the USSR features armed revolts by anti-communist nationalists who demand the political independence of their countries from the USSR. In the post-war period, the UN's military occupation of the USSR is managed by the United Nations Temporary Occupation Command (UNITOC).

In the aftermath of the atomic war between the UN and Russia, an editorial by the Christian Science Monitor newspaper reported that the UN's overthrowing of Communism in Russia allowed the peoples of Russia to publicly resume religious practise, to re-establish trade unions, to speak freely in the press, and to adopt Western-style democracy in Eurasian Russia. For the special-subject issue about “Preview of the War We Do Not Want”, the writer Philip Wylie wrote a story chronicling the romance between an American military officer and a Russian woman rendered infertile by ionizing radiation.

== See also ==
- Operation Dropshot, a then-top secret contingency plan that envisioned a nuclear and conventional war with the Soviet Union
