= Harold Mathews Brett =

American illustrator and painter

- Born: 1880; Middleboro, Massachusetts
- Died: 1955 (aged 74–75)
- Education: School of the Museum of Fine Arts, Boston
- Known for: Painter, Illustrator

Harold Mathews Brett (1880–1955) was an American illustrator and painter best known for his New England scenes and portraits. His style is that of realism and genre works. His illustrations have been featured in Harper's Weekly, Collier's Weekly, and The Saturday Evening Post. Brett's paintings hang in the Brandywine River Museum, Cape Cod Museum of Fine Art, and the Chatham Historical Society, among others.

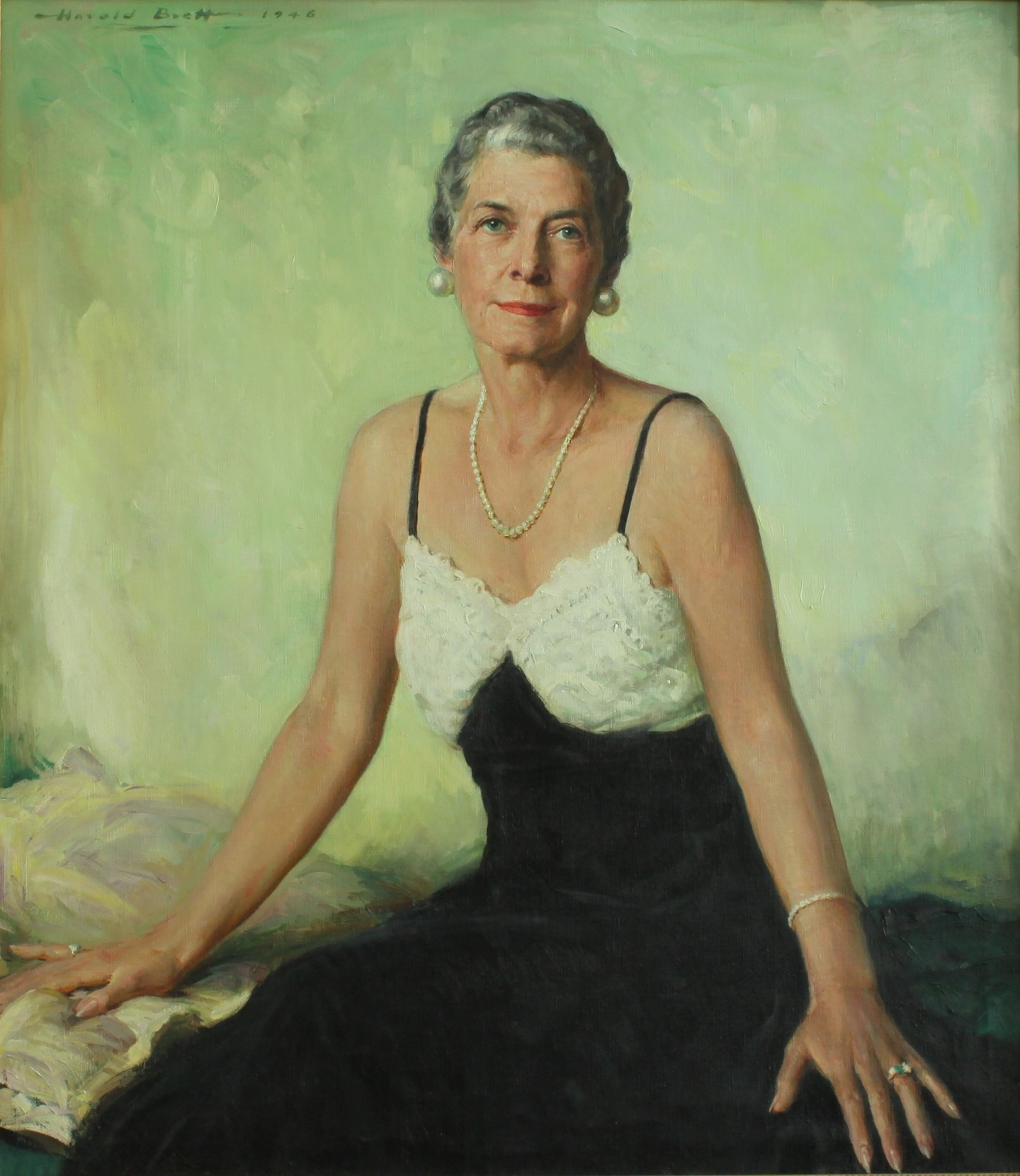
Portrait of Virginia Crocheron Gildersleeve

== Early life and education ==
Brett was born December 3, 1880, in Middleboro, Massachusetts, and spent his formative years in Brookline, Massachusetts. Brett attended the School of the Museum of Fine Arts, Boston where under the direction of Philip Hale and Frank Benson he honed his artistic skills. Seeking further artistic education Brett relocated to New York in order to study at the Art Students League. Artists that contributed to his development include: Walter Appleton Clark, H. Siddons Mowbray, and Kenyon Cox.

In 1906 Brett went to Wilmington, Delaware, to continue his studies with well-known illustrator Howard Pyle.

== Career success ==
Brett's career as an illustrator and painter took off soon after his studies with Howard Pyle. His first professional achievement was as an illustrator in Harper's Weekly (Checkers at the Country Store). An example of Brett's keen sense of narrative and human form appeared on the cover of the June 2, 1906, issue of Harper’s Weekly in black and white. : In the oil painting, The Checkers Game, you see a provision shop where three men are engaged in a game of checkers. A confident businessman looks on as his checkers opponent, a sea Captain, decides the next move. The aged yet spry shop keep presides over the game as an old man watches the scene.

Harold Brett settled in Chatham, Massachusetts on Cape Cod, where he continued to illustrate for magazines and books and was a member of the Fenway School of Illustration in Boston, Massachusetts. Examples of his print success include reproduced oils and original drawings for the author Joseph C. Lincoln used to illustrate several publications. Brett's painting for the jacket cover to Rafael Sabatini novel Hounds Of God exemplifies his ability to capture on canvas human emotion and plot.

Brett's painting and illustrations encompassed the same arena as Norman Rockwell, to which he can be compared. Brett sought to capture on canvas a moment suspended in time, often dealing with subject matter quintessential to American life. Like Rockwell, Brett's paintings include plot, emotion, and a nostalgia for times past.

== Later career ==
Brett's career continued to evolve as his talent for portrait painting developed. Brett maintained two studios, one in New York City, and the other in Chatham, MA. His portrait style followed that of his genre painting and captured the best of an individual as preserved in a moment in time. He painted his females gentile and refined while his portraits of men are displayed as confident, strong, and calm.

== Descriptive examples of work ==
- When the Choir Sings, Half length figures of four men and women in a row singing from two sheets of music, one held by young couple at left, other be older couple right.
- Supper Bell, Farm hand washing face near kitchen of farmhouse, old lady standing in vine covered door ringing bell.
- So Near and yet so Far, Father seated holding skirt of baby who is trying to walk across table to its mother.
- Twixt love and duty, Lady teacher and young man seated at desk holding hands and watching small boy write on blackboard.
