= Richard Deane Taylor =

American illustrator and commercial artist

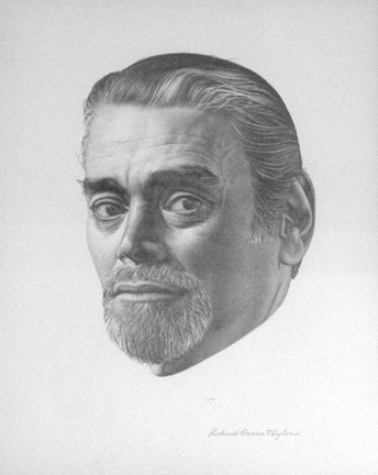
- Self-portrait (pencil on board)
- Born: Meyer Tuchschneider; January 13, 1925; New York City, U.S.
- Died: November 21, 2014 (aged 89); New York City, U.S.
- Spouse: Helena Roine-Taylor
- Children: 2

Richard Deane Taylor (January 13, 1925 – November 21, 2014) was an American illustrator, commercial artist, educator, portrait painter, and fine artist whose career spanned Golden Age comic books, editorial illustration, advertising art, and photorealist painting.

Taylor began his career as a staff cartoonist at Fawcett Publications in the early 1940s. After wartime service and study in Paris, he worked through the 1950s and 1960s as a magazine and advertising illustrator, contributing to publications including Collier's, TRUE, National Geographic, Holiday, Sport, and Life, and to campaigns for Hiram Walker, Dewar's Scotch Whisky, Johnson & Johnson, and Air France. He is best known for his 1951 portrait covers for Collier's, among them portraits of Herbert Hoover and Winston Churchill, and for his cover illustration for the magazine's Preview of the War We Do Not Want special issue.

From 1963 to 1989 Taylor taught commercial art at the High School of Art & Design in New York City, and in his later years he worked primarily as a fine art painter.

== Early life and education ==
Taylor was born Meyer Tuchschneider in New York City on January 13, 1925.

He attended Brooklyn Technical High School, where, under his birth name, he designed the inside cover of the June 1942 edition of the school's senior yearbook, The Blueprint. The yearbook's contents page credits "Inside Cover Design" to Tuchschneider.

== Golden Age comics ==
During the early 1940s Taylor worked as a staff cartoonist for Fawcett Publications, working alongside artists including C. C. Beck and Marc Swayze during the Golden Age of comic books.

In an interview with P.C. Hamerlinck, Taylor recounted his work on the story Captain Marvel and the Lie Detector during his time at Fawcett.

== Military service and study in Paris ==
American veteran art students Costa Alex, Richard Deane Taylor, and Herbert Gentry standing in a bread-ration line in Paris, c. 1947. The photograph was published in UN World, January 1948.

Taylor served in the United States Army from 1943 to 1946, working in the art department of the Provost Marshal General's School within the Corps of Military Police, where he produced posters, magazines, training charts, and instructional visual materials.

Following his military service in World War II, Taylor studied painting and illustration in Paris, attending the École des Beaux-Arts and the Académie de la Grande Chaumière. While living at the Cité Universitaire, he was part of a community of American veterans and artists that included Herbert Gentry. A January 1948 feature in UN World photographed Taylor and Gentry together with other American veteran students.

== Editorial illustration ==
By the early 1950s Taylor was working as a commercial illustrator and editorial artist for nationally distributed magazines. A 1952 profile in Art Director & Studio News documented his early magazine career, including work for Sport and Collier's, and his 1951 Collier's covers of Herbert Hoover, Winston Churchill, and Princess Margaret and Margaret Truman. The following year he was featured in American Artist as part of Strathmore Artist Papers' Prominent Artist Users series, which described his work for Fawcett Publications, his studies in Paris, and his editorial illustrations for Collier's.

Taylor created cover and interior illustrations for Collier's and other magazines between 1950 and 1980. His subjects included Winston Churchill, Herbert Hoover, Princess Margaret and Margaret Truman, the sportswriter Arch Ward, the baseball executive Al Lang, and the boxing manager Jack (Doc) Kearns. A further Collier's cover, published on April 15, 1955, depicted fishing flies and illustrated the issue's lead feature, "Ike's Fishing Secrets", on President Dwight D. Eisenhower's fly fishing. He also produced Cold War-themed political artwork for the magazine.

Taylor portrayed Eisenhower directly the following year. His cover artwork for the November 1956 issue of TRUE: The Man's Magazine, published ahead of that year's United States presidential election, paired portraits of Eisenhower and Adlai Stevenson.

=== Preview of the War We Do Not Want ===
Taylor's cover illustration for the October 27, 1951 special issue of Collier's, Preview of the War We Do Not Want

Taylor created the cover illustration for the October 27, 1951 special issue of Collier's, titled Preview of the War We Do Not Want. The issue presented a fictional account of a Third World War between the United Nations and the Soviet Union and the subsequent defeat and occupation of the Soviet Union. Taylor's cover depicted an American military policeman standing before a map showing the imagined postwar occupation.

The special issue brought together contributions from prominent writers and journalists, including Edward R. Murrow, Arthur Koestler, Lowell Thomas, Walter Winchell, and Robert E. Sherwood. Collier's increased its print order for the issue from 3.4 million to 3.9 million copies.

A 1979 retrospective in The Foreign Service Journal singled out Taylor's illustrations for the issue. Author Martin F. Herz described Taylor's depiction of an American parachute mission targeting the last Soviet atomic stockpile in the Urals as "brilliantly executed", and similarly praised his illustration of a postwar Russian newsstand.

Taylor's artwork was subsequently reproduced in scholarship examining American attitudes toward Russia and the Soviet Union during the Cold War. His painting was used on the hardcover of historian David S. Foglesong's The American Mission and the "Evil Empire": The Crusade for a "Free Russia" since 1881, published by Cambridge University Press. The book also reproduces Taylor's artwork on page 108, where it is credited to Richard Deane Taylor.

=== Herbert Hoover portrait ===
In 1951, Taylor painted a portrait of former U.S. president Herbert Hoover for the August 11, 1951 cover of Collier's. The painting is held by the Herbert Hoover Presidential Library and Museum and is documented in the National Portrait Gallery's Catalog of American Portraits, a research archive of the Smithsonian Institution.

=== Churchill portrait ===
Taylor's portrait of Winston Churchill, created for the September 22, 1951 cover of Collier's

Taylor's portrait of Winston Churchill, painted for the September 22, 1951 cover of Collier's, was reused in historical publications and biographies for decades afterward. Churchill historian Richard M. Langworth described the painting as one of the most "evocative and accurate" portraits of Churchill.

The portrait was used as the front jacket illustration for Churchill by Himself, edited by Langworth and published by Ebury Press / Random House, and on the cover of The Churchill Companion, which a 2013 issue of Finest Hour identified as Taylor's 1951 painting. It was also used for the French edition of Boris Johnson's Churchill biography Winston: Comment un seul homme a fait l'histoire.

== Commercial advertising ==
Taylor created illustration work for national advertising campaigns during the 1950s and 1960s. Contemporary trade press documented his work for Foote, Cone & Belding and McCann-Erickson. Agency correspondence and published advertisements document further commissions for firms including Young & Rubicam, Batten, Barton, Durstine & Osborn (BBDO), Cunningham & Walsh, and The Rossin Creative Group.

His work appeared in print and billboard campaigns for Folgers Coffee, Air France, White Owl Cigars, Viceroy Cigarettes, and AT&T Yellow Pages, including artwork associated with the Walking Fingers campaign for the New York Telephone Company. He also worked on campaigns associated with Hiram Walker, Dewar's Scotch Whisky, Johnson & Johnson, Gulf Oil, DuPont Chemicals, Schaefer Beer, and General Electric. In August 1958 the trade magazine Art Direction described an Esso advertisement that used lettering of city names arranged into an Esso sign in place of conventional artwork, and credited Taylor with the art spot appearing at the bottom right of the advertisement.

For Hiram Walker's Man, this is whiskey! Imperial Whiskey campaign, Taylor produced portrait illustrations of athletes, outdoorsmen, sailors, and authors, among them Roscoe Reams, Chuck Meyer, Louis L'Amour, and Lou Whitman. A June 1955 item in the trade magazine Art Direction reported that Taylor was one of three illustrators used for the series, alongside Robert Sloan and Giro, and that the campaign was handled by art director Orville Sheldon at Foote, Cone & Belding's Chicago office. According to the magazine, illustration was chosen over photography for the campaign because it gave better control of costuming and facial expression.

Taylor also created advertising artwork for Dewar's Scotch Whisky campaigns featuring Scottish ceremonial imagery, including a 1967 advertisement published in the Metropolitan Opera Program.

His professional experience was referenced in J. I. Biegeleisen's Careers and Opportunities in Commercial Art: A Survey of All Fields. In 2015, HuffPost published a retrospective on his commercial art career titled The Last of the Real Mad Men.

== Historical illustration and cartography ==
Taylor collaborated with historian and author Dan Kurzman, providing maps and illustration work for several historical publications including Race for Rome, Genesis 1948, Fatal Voyage: The Sinking of the USS Indianapolis, and Ben-Gurion: Prophet of Fire. Acknowledgments sections in Kurzman's books credited Taylor for drawing maps and historical illustrations used throughout the publications.

== Teaching ==
Taylor taught commercial art at the High School of Art & Design in New York City from 1963 to 1989, serving as acting chairman during the 1980–1981 academic year. He also served as an adjunct lecturer in commercial art at New York City Community College of the City University of New York from 1967 to 1974.

== Fine art ==
During the later decades of his career Taylor focused primarily on fine art painting, particularly photorealism, while continuing portrait and still-life work in oils, acrylics, and gouache.

== Exhibitions and recognition ==
Taylor exhibited in galleries and exhibitions in both the United States and France. His work appeared in exhibitions at the Kenny Gallery in New York, the Parkersburg Art Center in West Virginia, the Very Special Arts Gallery in Washington, D.C., and the Audubon Artists Annual Exhibition in New York.

In 1956, Taylor received an Honorable Mention from the Art Directors Club of Chicago for a 24-sheet outdoor advertising poster.

== Personal life and death ==
Taylor married Helena Roine in September 1963. Together they had two children. He died in New York City on November 21, 2014, at the age of 89.
