= The Mother Hive =

1908 short story by Rudyard Kipling

"The Mother Hive" is a short story or fable by Rudyard Kipling about the decline and destruction of a hive of bees. It was first published in Collier's Weekly in the US on 28 November 1908. Later in December of the same year, it was published in the Windsor Magazine in the UK with a title of the "Adventures of Melissa".

== Plot summary ==
Their downfall begins when, in a moment of carelessness, the guardians of the hive allow it to be infiltrated by a lesser wax moth, Achroia grisella. When her eggs hatch, the larvae devour honey and wax and undermine the structure of the hive, which leads to even worse problems. More and more bees are hatched with freakish deformities. Honoured traditions collapse. The only hope for salvation is hatching and rearing a secret clandestine princess.
