= Collier's =

Former American general interest magazine

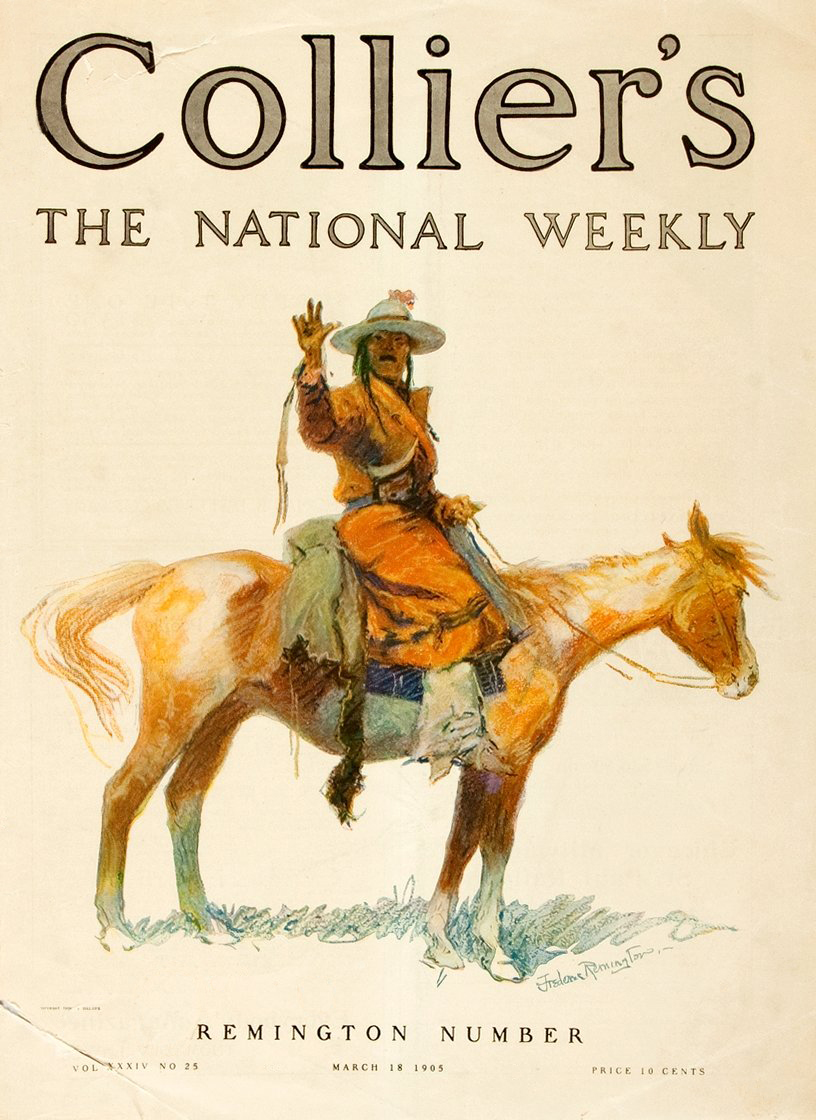
- The cover of the March 18, 1905 issue of Collier's featuring an illustration by Frederic Remington
- Founder: Peter Fenelon Collier
- First issue: April 28, 1888
- Final issue: January 4, 1957
- Country: United States
- Based in: New York City (until 1939) and then Springfield, Ohio, U.S.
- Language: English
- ISSN: 2161-6469

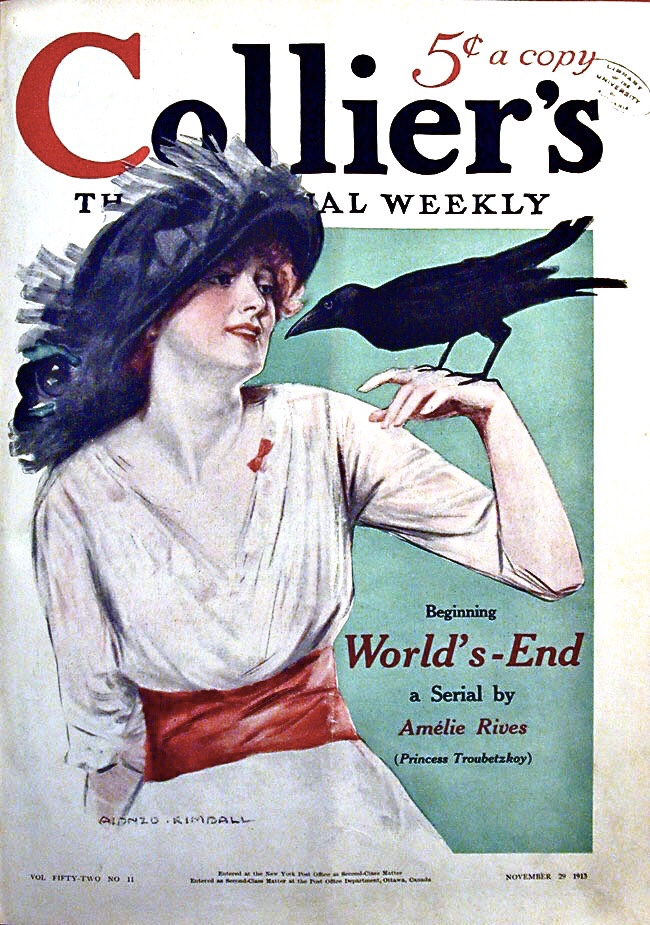
The cover of the November 29, 1913 edition of Collier's featuring an illustration by Alonzo Myron Kimball

Collier's was an American general-interest magazine founded in 1888 by Peter Fenelon Collier. It was launched as Collier's Once a Week, then renamed in 1895 as Collier's Weekly: An Illustrated Journal, shortened in 1905 to Collier's: The National Weekly and eventually to simply Collier's. The magazine ceased publication with the issue dated the week ending January 4, 1957. A brief, failed attempt was made to revive the Collier's name with a new magazine in 2012. A third reincarnation commenced publication in 2026.

As a result of Peter Collier's pioneering investigative journalism, Collier's established a reputation as a proponent of social reform. After lawsuits by several companies against Collier's ended in failure, other magazines joined in what Theodore Roosevelt described as "muckraking journalism". Founded by Nathan S. Collier, a descendant of Peter Collier, the Collier Prize for State Government Accountability was created in 2019. The annual US$25,000 prize is one of the largest American journalism prizes, and was established to honor Peter Collier's legacy and contributions in the field of investigative reporting.

== History ==
=== 19th century ===
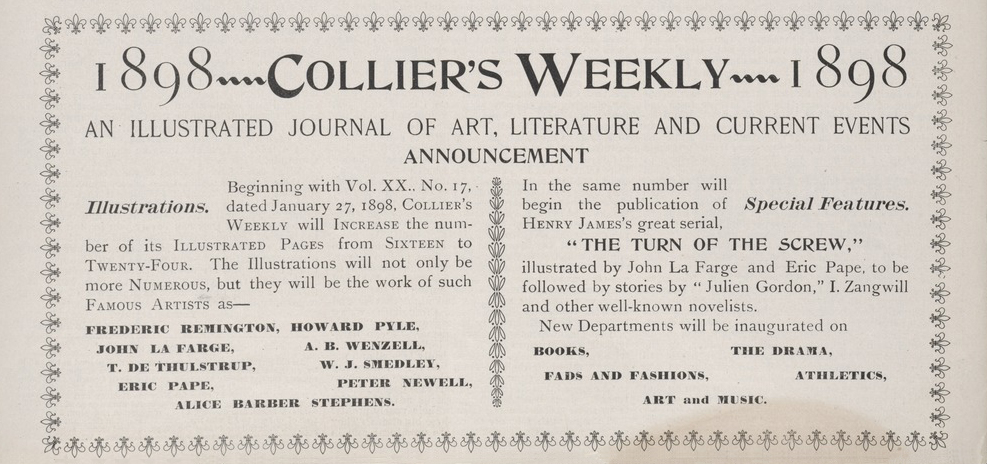
A January 6, 1898 Collier's Weekly advertisement announcing new magazine features, including an increase in pages, more illustrations, new departments, and the beginning of Henry James's novella The Turn of the Screw

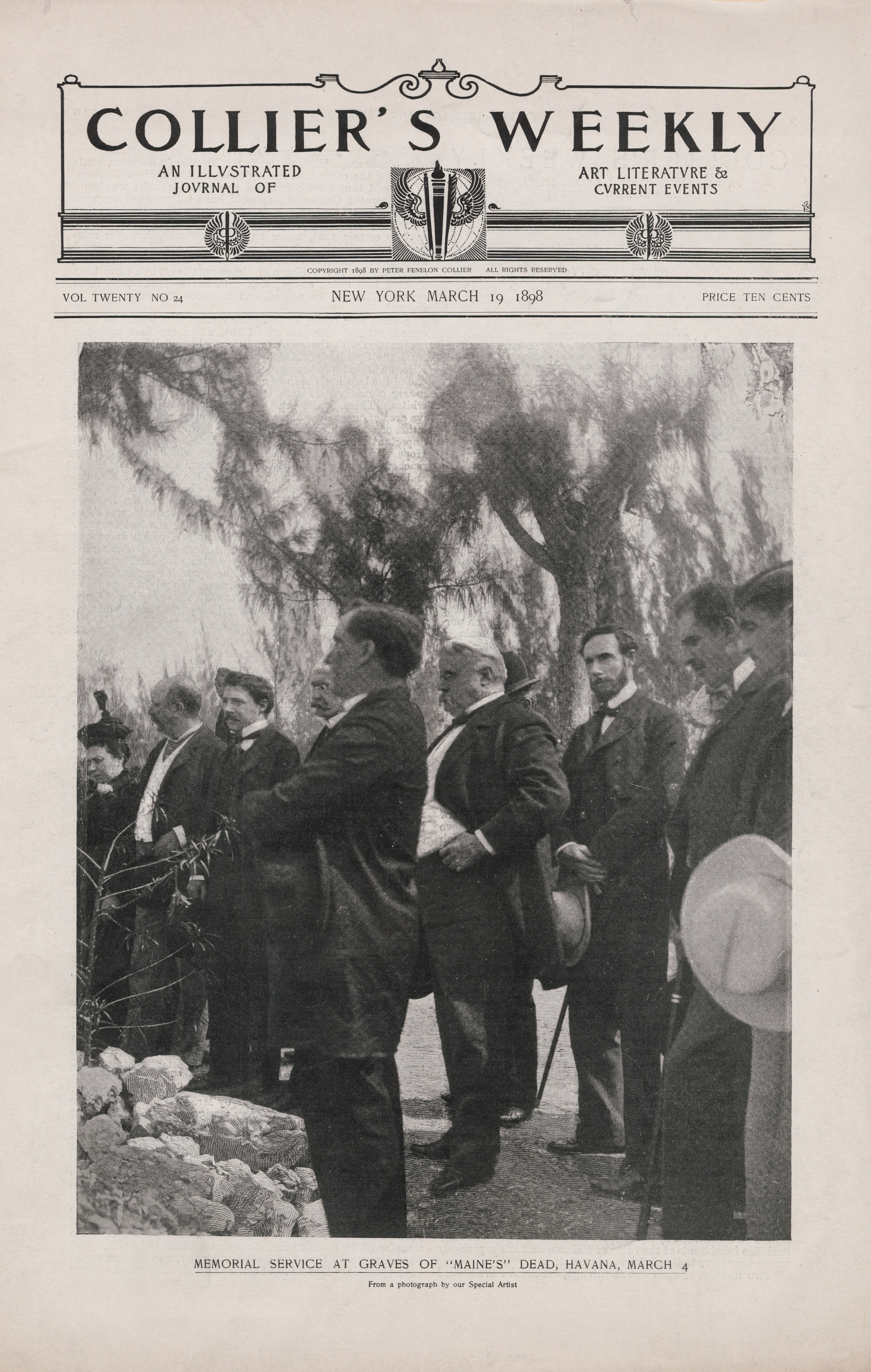
Photography by Jimmy Hare on the cover of the March 19, 1898 issue of Collier's Weekly

Peter F. Collier (1849–1909) left Ireland for the U.S. at age 17. Although he went to a seminary to become a priest, he instead started work as a salesman for P. J. Kenedy, publisher of books for the Roman Catholic market. When Collier wanted to boost sales by offering books on a subscription plan, it led to a disagreement with Kenedy, so Collier left to start his own subscription service. P. F. Collier & Son began in 1875, expanding into the largest subscription house in America with sales of 30 million books during the 1900–1910 decade.

With the issue dated April 28, 1888, Collier's Once a Week was launched as a magazine of "fiction, fact, sensation, wit, humor, news". It was sold with the biweekly Collier's Library of novels and popular books at bargain rates and as a stand-alone priced at seven cents. By 1892, with a circulation climbing past the 250,000 mark, Collier's Once a Week was one of the best selling magazines in the United States. The name was changed to Collier's Weekly: An Illustrated Journal in 1895 or the longer title Collier's Weekly: An Illustrated Journal of Art, Literature & Current Events. With an emphasis on news, the magazine became a leading exponent of the halftone news picture. To fully exploit the new technology, Collier recruited James H. Hare, one of the pioneers of photojournalism.

Collier's only son, Robert J. Collier, became a full partner in 1898.

=== 20th century ===
By 1904, the magazine was known as Collier's: The National Weekly. Peter Collier died in 1909. When Robert Collier died in 1918, he left a will that turned the magazine over to three of his friends, Samuel Dunn, Harry Payne Whitney and Francis Patrick Garvan.

Robert J. Collier won a lawsuit against Postum Cereal Company and was awarded $50,000 in damages, but in 1912 an appeals court then handed down a majority decision that Postum deserved a new trial. The Postum Company believed that Collier's weekly used magazine coverage to attack their company's products in retaliation for not advertising in Collier's after Collier's wrote against a Grape-Nuts's claim that it was an "A Food for Brain and Nerves." Postum then bought advertising pages in major newspapers in retaliation.

The magazine was sold in 1919 to the Crowell Publishing Company, which in 1939 was renamed as Crowell-Collier Publishing Company.

In 1924, Crowell moved the printing operations from New York City to Springfield, Ohio, but kept the editorial and business departments in New York City. Reasons given for moving print operations included conditions imposed by unions in the printing trade, expansion of the Gansevoort Market into the property occupied by the Collier plant, and "excessive postage involved in mailing from a seaboard city under wartime postal rates. After 1924, printing of the magazine was done at the Crowell-Collier printing plant on West High Street in Springfield, Ohio. It was built between 1899 and 1946, and incorporated seven buildings that together had more than 846,000 square feet (78,600 m^{2})—20 acres (81,000 m^{2})—of floor space. The factory complex was razed in 2019.

== Fiction ==
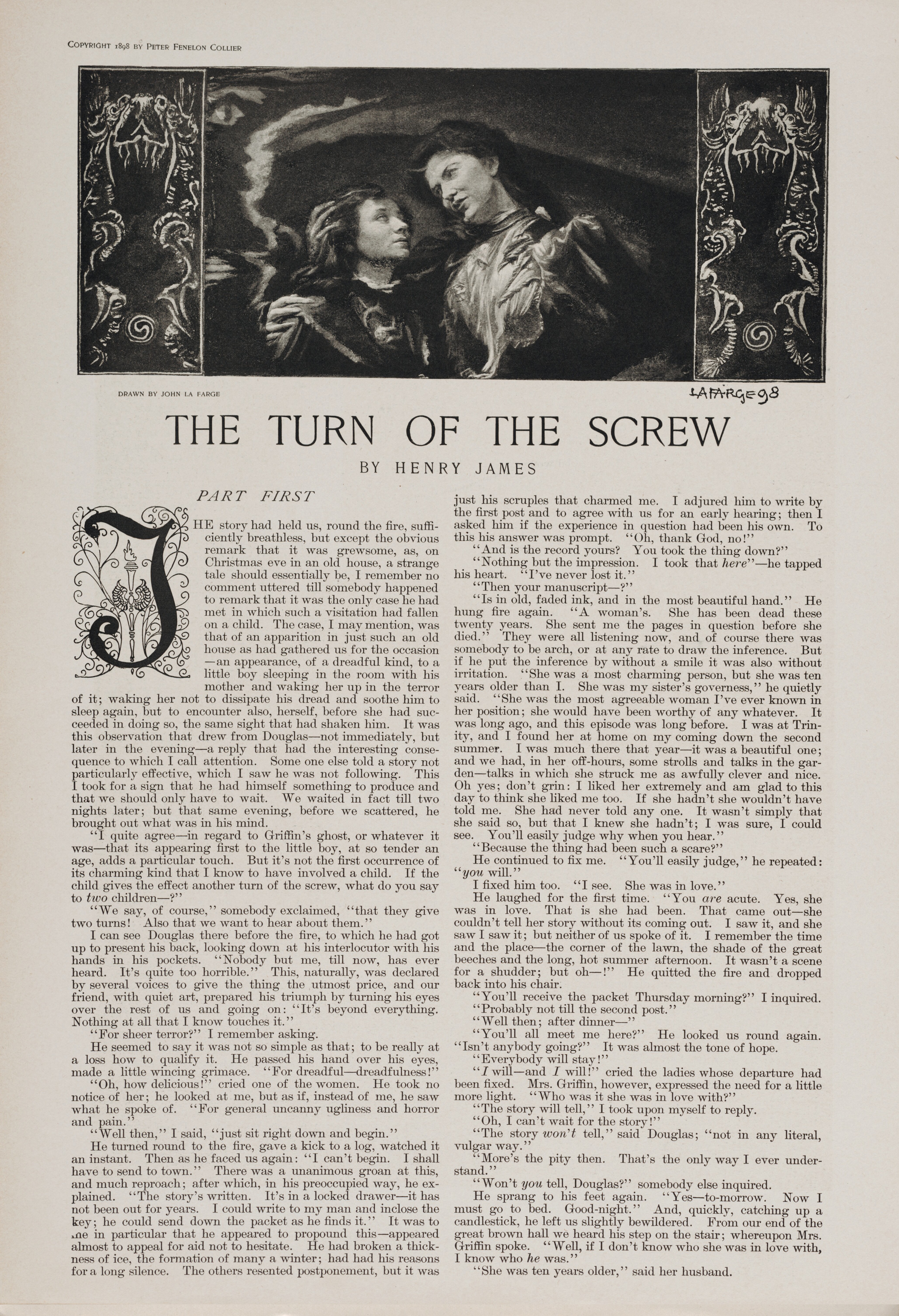
First page of the 12-part serialization of The Turn of the Screw in Collier's Weekly (January 27 – April 16, 1898)

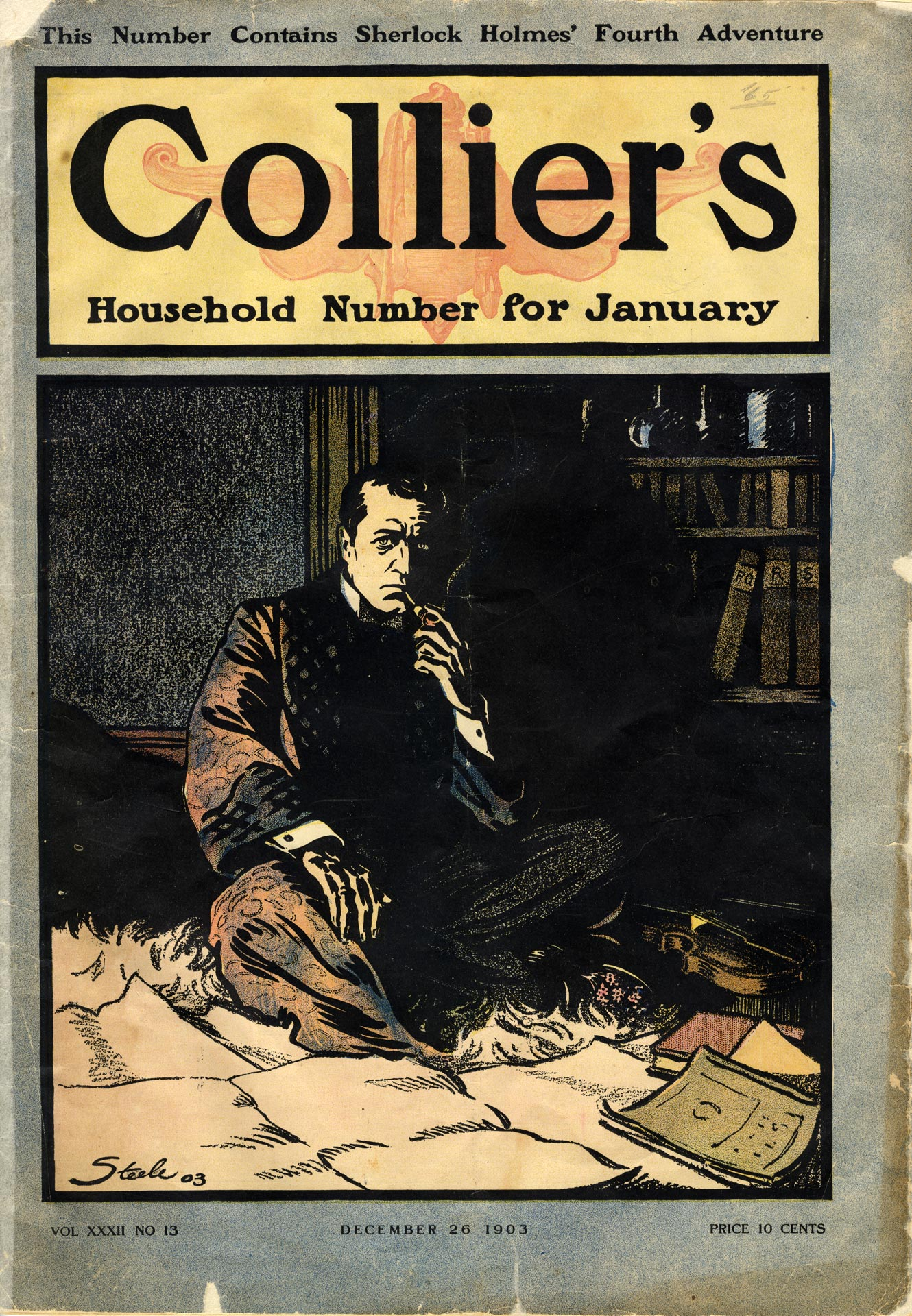
Frederic Dorr Steele's cover illustration for the Sherlock Holmes story, "The Adventure of the Solitary Cyclist" in the December 26, 1903 edition of Collier's

Collier's popularized the short-short story which was often planned to fit on a single page. Knox Burger was Collier's fiction editor from 1948 to 1951 when he left to edit books for Dell and Fawcett Publications; he was replaced by Eleanor Stierhem Rawson. The numerous authors who contributed fiction to Collier's included F. Scott Fitzgerald, Ray Bradbury, Eleanor Hoyt Brainerd, Willa Cather, Roald Dahl, Jack Finney, Erle Stanley Gardner, Zane Grey, Ring Lardner, Sinclair Lewis, E. Phillips Oppenheim, J. D. Salinger, Kurt Vonnegut, Louis L'Amour, Albert Payson Terhune and Walter Tevis. Humor writers included Parke Cummings and H. Allen Smith.

Serializing novels during the late 1920s, Collier's sometimes simultaneously ran two ten-part novels, and non-fiction was also serialized. Between 1913 and 1949, Sax Rohmer's Fu Manchu serials, illustrated by Joseph Clement Coll and others, were hugely popular. The first three Fu Manchu novels by Rohmer were actually compilations of 29 short stories that Rohmer wrote for Collier's.

The Mask of Fu Manchu, which was adapted into a 1932 film and a 1951 Wally Wood comic book, was first published as a 12-part Collier's serial, running from May 7 to July 23, 1932. The May 7 issue displayed a memorable cover illustration by famed maskmaker Władysław T. Benda, and his mask design for that cover was repeated by many other illustrators in subsequent adaptations and reprints.

A 1951 condensed version of the book The Day of the Triffids by John Wyndham also appeared.

== Illustrators ==
Leading illustrators contributed to the covers of Collier's. They included C. C. Beall, W.T. Benda, Chesley Bonestell, Charles R. Chickering, Howard Chandler Christy, Richard Deane Taylor, Arthur Crouch, Harrison Fisher, James Montgomery Flagg, Alan Foster, Charles Dana Gibson, Vernon Grant, Emil Hering, Earl Oliver Hurst, Alonzo Myron Kimball, Percy Leason, Frank X. Leyendecker, J. C. Leyendecker, Paul Martin, John Alan Maxwell, Ronald McLeod, John Cullen Murphy, Maxfield Parrish, Edward Penfield, Robert O. Reed, Frederic Remington, Anthony Saris, John Sloan, Jessie Willcox Smith, Frederic Dorr Steele, Arthur Szyk, Emmett Watson, Jon Whitcomb and Lawson Wood. Other top illustrators contributed prolifically to their short stories. They included Harold Mathews Brett, Richard V. Culter, Robert Fawcett, Denver Gillen and Quentin Reynolds.

In 1903, Gibson signed a $100,000 contract, agreeing to deliver 100 pictures (at $1000 each) during the next four years. From 1904 to 1910, Parrish was under exclusive contract to Collier's, which published his famed Arabian Nights paintings in 1906-07.

== Investigative journalism ==
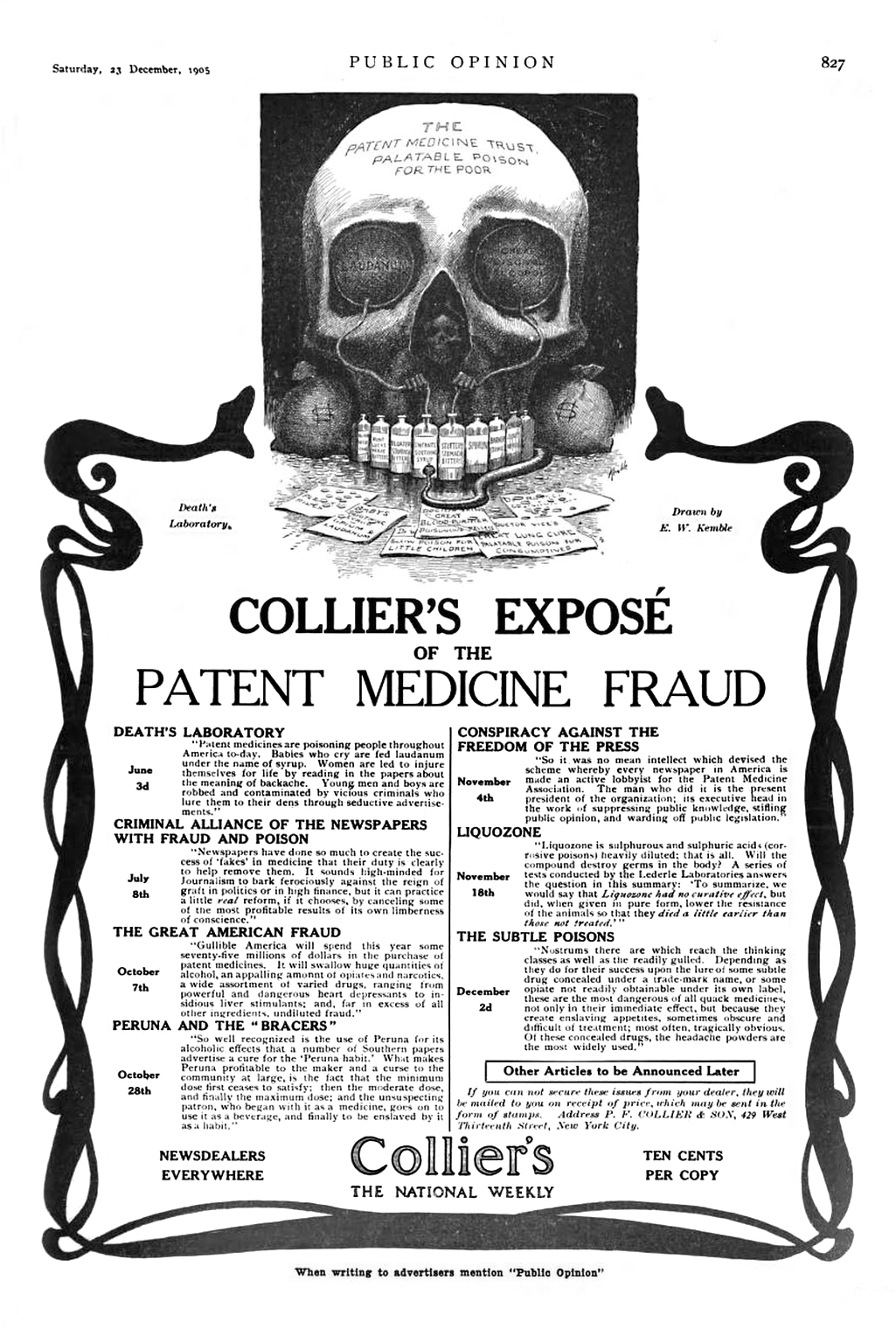
A December 1905 advertisement for Collier's magazine's exposé of patent medicine fraud, which culminated in Samuel Hopkins Adams' 11-part series "The Great American Fraud"

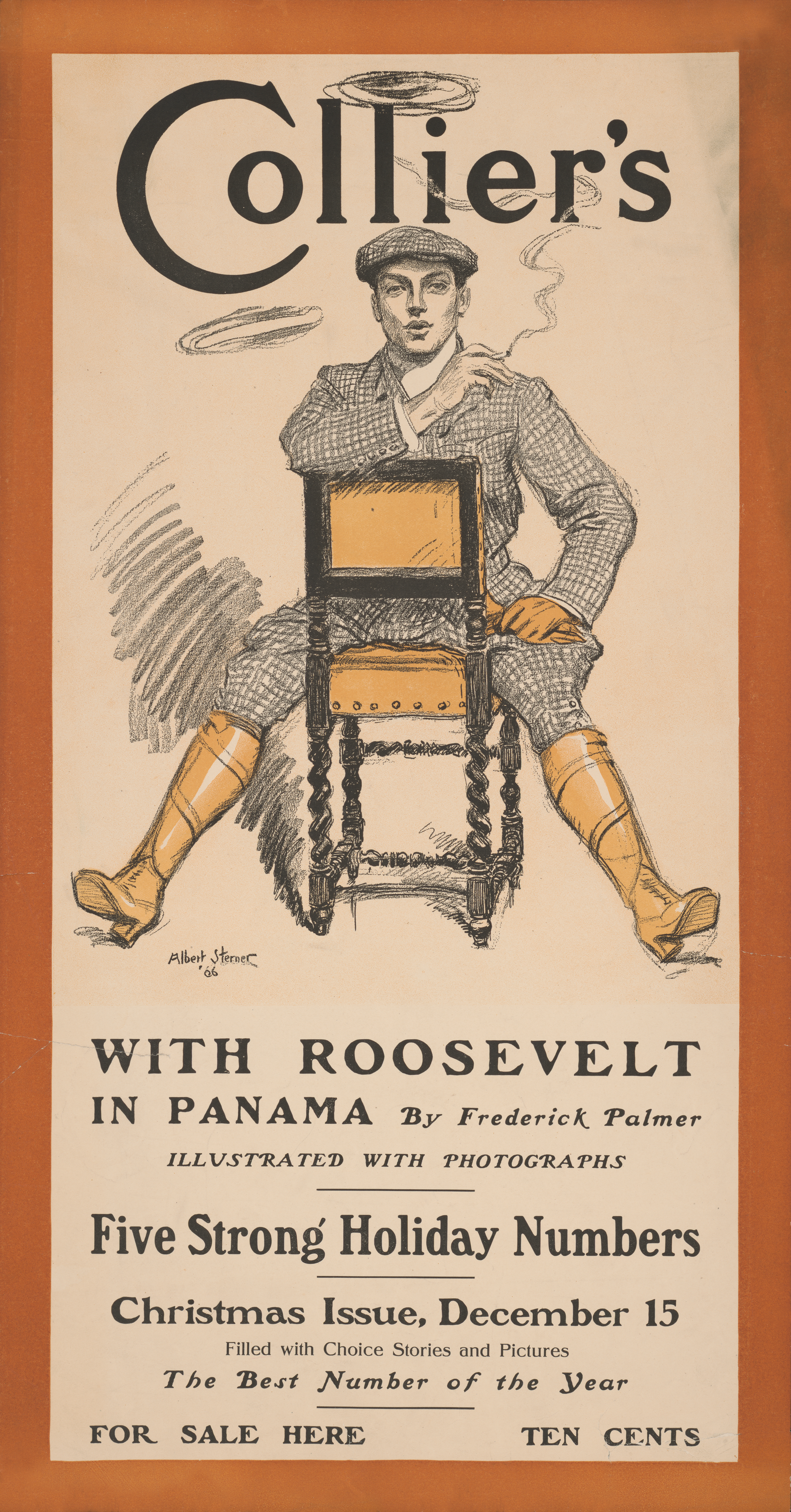
A poster promoting Collier's in 1906

When Norman Hapgood became editor of Collier's in 1903, he attracted many leading writers. In May 1906, he commissioned Jack London to cover the San Francisco earthquake, a report accompanied by 16 pages of pictures. Under Hapgood's guidance, Collier's began publishing the work of investigative journalists such as Samuel Hopkins Adams, Ray Stannard Baker, C. P. Connolly and Ida Tarbell. Hapgood's approach had great impact, resulting in such changes as the reform of the child labor laws, slum clearance and women's suffrage. In April 1905, an article by Upton Sinclair, "Is Chicago Meat Clean?", persuaded the Senate to pass the 1906 Meat Inspection Act.

Starting October 7, 1905, Adams startled readers with "The Great American Fraud", an 11-part Collier's series. Analyzing the contents of popular patent medicines, Adams pointed out that the companies producing these medicines were making false claims about their products and some were health hazards. Hapgood launched the series with the following editorial:

In the present number we print the first article in "The Great American Fraud" series, which is to describe thoroughly the ways and methods, as well as the evils and dangers, of the patent medicine business. This article is but the opening gun of the campaign, and is largely introductory in character, but it will give the reader a good idea of what is to come when Mr. Adams gets down to peculiarities. The next article, to appear two weeks hence, will treat of "Peruna and the 'Bracers'", that is, of those concoctions which are advertised and sold as medicines, but which in reality are practically cocktails.

Since these articles on patent medicine frauds were announced in Collier's some time ago, most of the makers of alcoholic and opiated medicines have been running to cover, and even the Government has been awakened to a sense of responsibility. A few weeks ago the Commissioner of Internal Revenue issued an order to his Collectors, ordering them to exact a special tax from the manufacturer of every compound composed of distilled spirits, "even though drugs have been added thereto". The list of "tonics", "blood purifiers" and "cures" that will come under this head has not yet been published by the Treasury Department, but it is bound to include a good many of the beverages which, up to the present time, have been soothing the consciences while stimulating the palates of the temperance folk. The next official move will doubtless be against the opium-sellers; but these have likewise taken fright, and several of the most notorious "consumption cures" no longer include opium or hasheesh in their concoction.

"The Great American Fraud" had a powerful impact and led to the first Pure Food and Drug Act (1906). The entire series was reprinted by the American Medical Association in a book, The Great American Fraud, which sold 500,000 copies at 50 cents each.

Hapgood had a huge influence on public opinion, and between 1909 and 1912, he succeeded in doubling the circulation of Collier's from a half million to a million. When he moved on to Harper's Weekly in 1912, he was replaced as editor for the next couple years by Robert J. Collier, the son of the founder. Arthur H. Vandenberg, later to become a prominent Senator, had a brief stint as a Collier's editor during the 1900s. H. C. Witwer was a war correspondent in France during World War I. Rob Wagner covered the film industry for Collier's during the 1920s. They reversed their position on prohibition in 1925. This was due to the difficulty in enforcing the referendum, and people's unwillingness to stay away from alcohol. The new law brought about bribing, thieving, corruption and other ills, which far exceeded their expectations. This new alignment gained favor with the public and helped to rebuild circulation.

Writers such as Martha Gellhorn and Ernest Hemingway, who reported on the Spanish Civil War, helped boost the circulation. Winston Churchill, who wrote an account of the First World War, was a regular contributor during the 1930s, but his series of articles ended in 1939 when he became a minister in the British government. Carl Fick was a Collier's staff writer prior to World War II.

== Cartoonists ==
The magazine's roster of top cartoonists included Charles Addams, Carl Anderson, Stan and Jan Berenstain, Sam Berman, Sam Cobean, Jack Cole, A. B. Frost, Ralph Fuller, Dave Gerard, Vernon Grant, Jay Irving, Crockett Johnson, E. W. Kemble, Hank Ketcham, George Lichty, David Low, Bill Mauldin, Virgil Partch, Mischa Richter, William Steig, Charles Henry "Bill" Sykes, Richard Taylor, Gluyas Williams, Gahan Wilson and Rowland B. Wilson. Irving's association with Collier's began in 1932, and his "Collier's Cops" became a mainstay of the magazine during his 13-year association with it.

Kate Osann's Tizzy cartoons first appeared in Collier's. The redheaded Tizzy was a teenage American girl who wore horn-rimmed glasses with triangular lenses. Tizzy was syndicated by NEA after Collier's folded. The cartoons were in color in Collier's but black-and-white in syndication and paperback reprints.

After World War II, Harry Devlin became the top editorial cartoonist at Collier's, one of the few publications then displaying editorial cartoons in full color. During the 1940s, Gurney Williams was the cartoon editor for Collier's, American Magazine and Woman's Home Companion, paying $40 to $150 for each cartoon. From a staggering stack of some 2000 submissions each week, Williams made a weekly selection of 30 to 50 cartoons, lamenting:

The other day I found myself staring at the millionth cartoon submitted to me since I became humor editor here. I wish it could have been fresh and original. Instead, it showed several ostriches with their heads buried in the sand. Two others stood nearby. Said one to the other: "Where is everybody?"

Joseph Barbera, before he found fame in animation, had several cartoons published in Collier's in the late 1920s and early 1930s.

== Radio ==
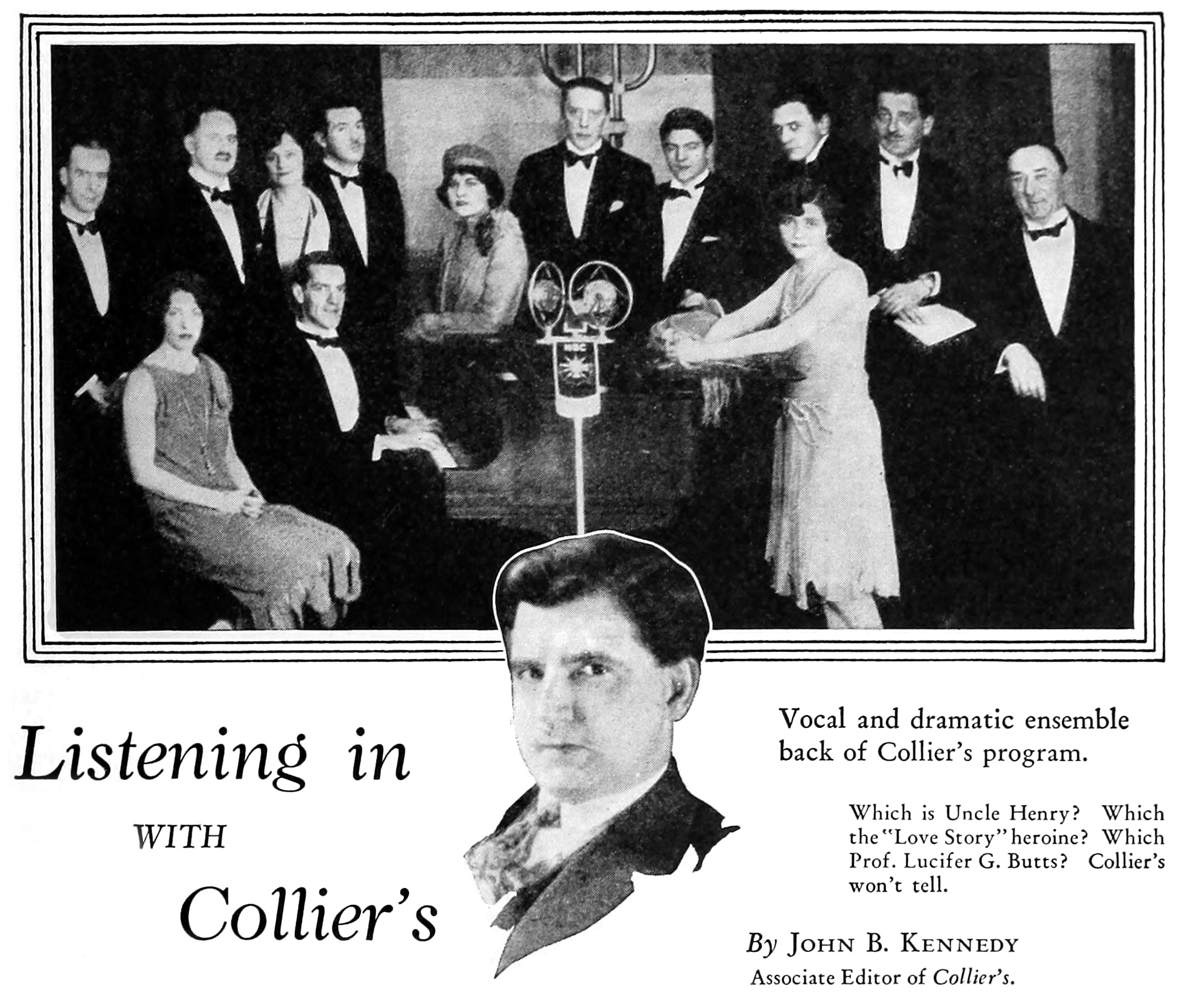
The uncredited ensemble presenting The Collier Hour in a feature story by John B. Kennedy, associate editor of Collier's in 1930

The circulation battle with The Saturday Evening Post led to the creation of The Collier Hour, broadcast 1927–32 on the NBC Blue Network. It was radio's first major dramatic anthology series, adapting stories and serials from Collier's. The hour-long program initially aired on the Wednesday before weekly publication, but switched to Sundays to avoid spoilers with stories that appeared simultaneously in the magazine. In 1929 the program began to incorporate music, news, sports and comedy with the dramatic content of the show.

== Later years ==
At the outbreak of World War II in 1941, with William L. Chenery as editor, Collier's readership reached 2.5 million. In the October 14, 1944, issue, the magazine published one of the first articles about concentration camps. It was Jan Karski's "Polish Death Camp," a harrowing account of his visit to Belzec. The now problematic title is explored in "Polish death camp controversy", under the heading "Use and Reactions". Karski's book Story of a Secret State, which included the Collier's excerpt, was published later that year by Houghton Mifflin. It became a Book of the Month Club selection, and bestseller with 400,000 copies sold in 1944-45. The Collier's selection was reprinted in Robert H. Abzug's America Views the Holocaust: 1933-1945 (Palgrave, 1999).

Collier's had a circulation of 2,846,052 when Walter Davenport took over as editor in 1946, but the magazine began to lose readers during the post-World War II years. Collier's published a regular men's fashion feature contributed by Esquire co-founder Henry L. Jackson and also published long-awaited images from the 200-inch (5.08 m) Hale Telescope's first light in 1949. In the early 1950s, Collier's ran a groundbreaking series of science-based articles speculating on space flight, Man Will Conquer Space Soon!, which prompted the general public to seriously consider the possibility of a trip to the moon, with the percentage of Americans who believed a crewed lunar trip could happen within 50 years changing from 15% to 38% by 1955.

Preview of the War We Do Not Want, Richard Deane Taylor painted the cover for the October 27, 1951 issue of Collier's

In 1951, an entire issue described the events and outcome of a hypothetical war between the United States and the Soviet Union, entitled Preview of the War We Do Not Want. The cover was painted by Richard Deane Taylor. Collier's changed from a weekly to a biweekly in August 1953, but it continued to lose money. In 1954, John O'Hara became a columnist with his "Appointment with O'Hara" column.

The magazine ceased publication with the issue for the week ending January 4, 1957. Princess Grace of Monaco was featured on the cover, pregnant with her first child Caroline.

== Books ==
The company also published the Collier's Encyclopedia, Collier Books and the Collier's Year Book.

Patricia Fulford edited Over 100 Best Cartoons from Collier's, Ladies Home Journal, Redbook, The American Magazine, Saturday Evening Post, The New Yorker, Argosy, Sport (Checkerbooks, 1949), and Collier's cartoon editor Gurney Williams edited Collier's Kids: Cartoons from Collier's About Your Children, Holt, 1952.

Collier's fiction editor Knox Burger chose 19 stories for Collier's Best (Harper & Bros., 1951). He also selected Best Stories from Collier's (William Kimber, 1952). A huge history and collection appeared with the publication of the 558-page A Cavalcade of Collier's, edited by Kenneth McArdle (Barnes, 1959).

Cornelius Ryan's 1957 book One Minute to Ditch!, about the successful ocean ditching of a Pan American Boeing 377 Stratocruiser, was an expansion of his Collier's article on December 21, 1956. Ryan was an associate editor of the magazine during the mid-1950s, and the novelist Lonnie Coleman was an editorial associate during that same period.

=== Titles ===
- Collier's Once a Week (1888-1889)
- Once a Week, an Illustrated Weekly Newspaper (1889-1895)
- Collier's Weekly, an Illustrated Journal (1895-1904)
- Collier's, The National Weekly (1905-1957)

=== First and last issues ===
- First Issue: April 28, 1888
- Last Issue: January 4, 1957

=== Publishing frequency ===
- Weekly (1888-1953)
- Fortnightly (1953-1957)

=== Publishers ===
- P. F. Collier, New York (1888-1900)
- P. F. Collier and Son, New York (1900-1919)
- P. F. Collier & Son Company, editorial offices, New York; publication offices, Springfield, Ohio (1919-1934)
- Crowell Publishing Company, editorial offices, New York; publication offices, Springfield, Ohio (1934-1939)
- Crowell-Collier Publishing Company, editorial offices, New York; publication offices, Springfield, Ohio (1939-1957)
- LNN USA, editorial offices, Hammonton, NJ, publication offices, Hammonton, NJ (2026-Present)

=== Editors ===
- Nugent Robinson (1888-1890)
- Mayo Williamson Hazeltine (1891)
- Julius Chambers (1892-1893)
- T.B. Connory (1893-1896)
- Daniel Lyons (1896-1898)
- Robert Joseph Collier (1898-1902)
- Norman Hapgood (1902-1913)
- Mark Sullivan (1913-1917)
- Finley Peter Dunne (1917-1919)
- Harford Powel Jr. (1919-1922)
- Richard J. Walsh (1922-1924)
- Loren Palmer (1924-1925)
- William L. Chenery (1925-1943)
- Charles Colebaugh (1943-1944)
- Henry La Cossitt (1944-1946)
- Walter Davenport (1946-1949)
- Louis Ruppel (1949-1952)
- Roger Dakin (1952-1955)
- Kenneth McArdle (1955-1957)
- Paul Clifford Smith, editor-in-chief, (1954-1957)

== See also ==
- "Mnemonics" by Kurt Vonnegut
- "The Mother Hive" by Rudyard Kipling
- "The Package" by Kurt Vonnegut
- "Poison" by Roald Dahl
- "Thanasphere" by Kurt Vonnegut
- "There Will Come Soft Rains" by Ray Bradbury

== Sources ==
- Lerner, Mark (2010). Charles R. Chickering: Cachetmaker - Part I.
  American First Day Cover Society. p. 10., Book
