= Dan Kurzman =

American journalist and writer

Daniel Halperin Kurzman (March 27, 1922, in San Francisco – December 12, 2010, in Manhattan), was an American journalist and writer of military history books. He studied at the University of California, Berkeley, served in the U.S. Army from 1943 to 1946, and completed his studies at Berkeley with a bachelor's degree in political science. At the end of his life, Dan Kurzman lived in North Bergen (New Jersey) with his wife, Florence. He died December 12, 2010, at the age of 88, in Manhattan. (His wife had died the previous year.)

== Career ==
In the early 1950s, Kurzman worked in Europe and in Israel for American newspapers and news agencies, thereafter becoming correspondent of NBC News in Jerusalem.

Mr. Kurzman's first assignment was as corre-spondent for the Paris Bureau of International News Service, and he later became feature editor of the Marshall Plan Information Division in Paris. From 1950 to 1952 he served as Middle East cor-respondent for the National Broadcasting Com-pany, covering such events as the assassination of Jordan's King Abdullah, the Iranian oil crisis, the Black Saturday anti-British riots in Cairo, the first nationalist riots in Tunis, and the Arab-Israeli bor-der disputes.

In 1953 he made a year-long, village-to-village tour of North Africa, the Middle East, and Asia—from Casablanca to Tokyo. His articles appeared in several major newspapers and magazines.

In 1954 he returned to Tokyo as Far East bureau chief of the McGraw-Hill World News Service. In 1958 he visited Russia, entering by an unusual route—from Kabul, Afghanistan, across the Hindu-Kush Mountains to Tashkent. Later in 1958 he went back to the Middle East to cover the landing of American Marines in Beirut, Lebanon, for the Washington Post, following up this assignment with a six-month overland tour of Black Africa, also for the Post.

Early in 1959 Mr. Kurzman returned to the, United States to work on Kishi and Japan (pub-lished in 1960), but soon went back to Africa to cover the Congo crisis for various publications, as well as to report on nationalist uprisings in other African countries.

In 1960, he published his first political book, a biography of the Japanese Prime Minister, Nobusuke Kishi. In the 1960s, Kurzman worked as a foreign policy correspondent for The Washington Post. In 1965 he received the George Polk Award for external reporting.

Later in life, he left the Washington Post and focused on researching and writing Modern History, especially military history non-fiction. In 1980 he received the Cornelius Ryan Award. A Polish-Israeli research team have suggested that much of what Kurzman wrote about the Warsaw Ghetto was actually tainted by the personal testimony of unreliable Polish witnesses who deliberately magnified their own role in wartime Warsaw - most notably, Henryk Iwanski. Dariusz Libionka and Laurence Weinbaum suggest that Kurzman accepted the account of Iwanski (who presented himself as a hero) uncritically, and that Iwanski's testimony should be treated as confabulation.

== Works ==
- Kishi and Japan: The Search for the Sun, New York: Obolensky, 1960 (dt.:Japan is looking for new ways: the political and economic development in the 20th century, München: Beck 1961)
- Subversion of the Innocents: Patterns of Communist Penetration in Africa, the Middle East, and Asia, New York: Random House 1963
- Santo Domingo: Revolt of the Damned: the Eyewitness, Detailed, Inside Account of the Dominican Revolution, New York: GP Putnam 1965
- Genesis 1948: The First Arab-Israeli War, New York : World Pub. Co., 1970 (maps illustrated by Richard Deane Taylor)
- The Race for Rome, Garden City NY: Doubleday, 1975, ISBN 0-385-06555-8 (Ger.:If Rome: the battle for the Eternal City in 1944, Munich: Bertelsmann, 1978, ISBN 3-570-01472-X) (maps illustrated by Richard Deane Taylor)
- The Bravest Battle: the Twenty-Eight Days of the Warsaw Ghetto Uprising, New York: Putnam, 1976, ISBN 0-399-11692-3 (Ger.:Insurrection: the last days of the Warsaw ghetto, Munich: Bertelsmann, 1979, ISBN 3-570-02132-7)
- Miracle of November: Madrid's Epic Stand, 1936, New York: Putnam, 1980, ISBN 0-399-12271-0 (Ger.:The November surprise: the battle for Madrid, the fall of 1936; Munich: Heyne, 1982, ISBN 3-453-01613-0)
- Ben-Gurion: Prophet of Fire, New York: Simon and Schuster 1983, ISBN 0-671-23094-8 (maps illustrated by Richard Deane Taylor)
- Day of the Bomb: Countdown to Hiroshima, New York etc.: McGraw-Hill 1985, ISBN 0-07-035683-1
- A Killing Wind: Inside Union Carbide and the Bhopal Catastrophe, New York et al. McGraw-Hill 1987, ISBN 0-07-035687-4
- Fatal Voyage: The Sinking of the USS Indianapolis, New York: Atheneum, 1990, ISBN 0-689-12007-9 (maps illustrated by Richard Deane Taylor)
- Left to Die: the Tragedy of the USS Juneau,, New York et al. : Pocket Books, ISBN 0-671-74873-4
- Blood and Water: Sabotaging Hitler's Bomb, New York: Holt, 1997, ISBN 0-8050-3206-1
- Soldier of Peace: The Life of Yitzhak Rabin, 1922 - 1995, New York: HarperCollins 1998, ISBN 0-06-018684-4
- Disaster! : The Great San Francisco Earthquake and Fire of 1906, New York: Perennial 2002, ISBN 0-06-008432-4
- No Greater Glory: The Four Immortal Chaplains of World War II and the Sinking of the Dorchester, New York: Random House 2004, ISBN 0-375-50877-5
- A Special Mission: Hitler's Secret Plot to Seize the Vatican and Kidnap Pope Pius XII, Cambridge, MA: Da Capo, 2007, ISBN 0-306-81468-4

== Awards ==
- 1984 National Jewish Book Award for Ben-Gurion: Prophet of Fire
